= George Lucas (disambiguation) =

George Lucas (born 1944) is an American film director.

George Lucas may also refer to:

- George A. Lucas (1824–1909), American-born art dealer living in Paris
- George W. Lucas (soldier) (1845–1921), American soldier and Medal of Honor recipient
- George W. Lucas (politician) (1807–1881), American politician in Iowa
- George Lucas, 1st Baron Lucas of Chilworth (1896–1967), British businessman and Labour politician
- George Lucas (footballer, born 1901) (1901–1995), Australian rules footballer for St Kilda
- George Lucas (footballer, born 1920) (1920–1969), Australian rules footballer for South Melbourne
- George Joseph Lucas (born 1949), American archbishop of the Catholic Archdiocese of Omaha
- George R. Lucas Jr. (born 1949), American philosopher
- George Lucas (footballer, born 1984), Brazilian footballer
- George Lucas, a character in Edwin Arlington Robinson play Van Zorn

== See also ==
- George Lucas Hartsuff (1830–1874), American Civil War general
- György Lukács (1885–1971), Hungarian philosopher
- György Lukács (politician) (1865–1950), Hungarian politician
- Jorge Lucas (born 1963), Uruguayan comic book illustrator
- Loucas George or Lucas George, American television director and producer
