= Francis Parker =

Francis Parker may refer to:

== People ==
- Francis R. Parker (1800–1894), farmer, lawyer and political figure in Nova Scotia
- Francis Wayland Parker (1837–1902), American champion of progressive education
- Francis Hubert Parker (1850–1927), American attorney and judge
- Francis Parker (UK politician) (1851–1931), British Member of Parliament for Henley, 1886–1895
- Salty Parker (Francis James Parker, 1912–1992), American baseball player
- Francis H. Parker (1920–2004), American philosopher
- Francis I. Parker (1923–2008), American judge
- Francis L. Parker (1873–1966), US Army brigadier general

== Fictional characters ==
- Francis Parker, a character in The Fairly OddParents

== Schools ==
- Francis W. Parker School (Chicago), founded in 1901
- Francis Parker School (San Diego), founded in 1912
- Francis W. Parker Charter Essential School, in Devens, Massachusetts, founded in 1995

== See also ==
- Frances Parker (1875–1924), British suffragette
- Frank Parker (disambiguation)
