= Metaphysical Society of America =

Philosophical organization founded by Paul Weiss in 1950

- Founder: Paul Weiss
- Established: 1950
- Mission: To advance the study of metaphysics
- President: Phillip Stambovsky
- Location: United States
- Website: Metaphysicalsociety.org

The Metaphysical Society of America (MSA) is a philosophical organization founded by Paul Weiss in 1950. As stated in its constitution, "The purpose of the Metaphysical Society of America is the study of reality." The society is a member of the American Council of Learned Societies.

== Early history and purpose ==
In his opening address, "The Four-Fold Art of Avoiding Questions", Paul Weiss spoke of the need for a society that would reinvigorate philosophic inquiry. He denounced "parochialism," referring to those who insisted upon "some one method, say that of pragmatism, instrumentalism, idealism, analysis, linguistics or logistics, and denied the importance of meaningfulness of anything which lies beyond its scope or power," as well as those who confined their studies to only some historic era.

Early in the history of the society, there was some dispute about whether certain schools of thought should be included in the program. By the second meeting there was controversy regarding papers by logicians, a controversy possibly fueled by the dominance of positivism in that decade. Before 1960, there had been some fear of admitting the existential metaphysics. However, as Paul Weiss remarked in 1969, the society had succeeded in accomplishing metaphysical diversity:

Gradually and persistently, year after year, men of the most diverse backgrounds and commitments exhibited the strengths and weaknesses of their doctrines and methods. Every year, men from all over the United States met to engage in original and historic studies of basic questions regarding the nature of knowledge and reality.

A book on the history of the society, Being in America: Sixty Years of the Metaphysical Society, was published by Rodopi in 2014 in its Histories and Addresses of Philosophical Societies Series.

== Findlay Book Prize ==
The Findlay Book Prize started in 1992. It is awarded to "the best work of metaphysics." It was established in honor of its namesake, J. N. Findlay, who was President of MSA in 1975.

== Presidents and addresses ==
Since the founding of the Metaphysical Society, presidential addresses have been published in the Review of Metaphysics, which was also founded by Paul Weiss.

Year	President	Presidential address
1952	Paul Weiss	"The Past: Its Nature and Reality"
1953	Paul Weiss	"The Contemporary World"
1954	John Wild	"The New Empiricism and Human Time"
1955	Charles Hartshorne	"Some Empty Though Important Thoughts"
1956	Newton P. Stallknecht	"The Quality of Man"
1957	George Klubertanz	"The Problem of the Analogy of Being"
1958	William Ernest Hocking	"Fact, Field and Destiny: Inductive Elements of Metaphysics"
1959	Rudolph Allers	"The Subjective and the Objective"
1960	Richard McKeon	"Being, Existence, and That Which Is"
1961	Henry Veatch	"Matrix, Matter, And Method in Metaphysics"
1962	James Daniel Collins	"The Bond of Natural Being"
1963	Donald Cary Williams	"Necessary Facts"
1964	Peter Bertocci	"Toward a Metaphysics of Creation"
1965	Francis H. Parker	"The Temporal Being of Western Man"
1966	Robert Brumbaugh	"Applied Metaphysics: Truth and Passing Time"
1967	John Herman Randall Jr.	"Metaphysics and Language"
1968	W. Norris Clarke	"The Self as Source of Meaning in Metaphysics"
1969	Errol Harris	"The Power of Reason"
1970	Richard Hocking	"Event, Act and Presence"
1971	John Edwin Smith	"Being, Immediacy and Articulation"
1972	Joseph Owens	"Reality and Metaphysics"
1973	Roderick Chisholm	"Parts as Essential to Their Wholes"
1974	Ernan McMullin	"Two Faces of Science"
1975	J. N. Findlay	"The Three Hypostases of Platonism"
1976	Marjorie Grene	"Merleau-Ponty and the Renewal of Ontology"
1977	Wilfrid Sellars	"Being as Becoming: Towards a Metaphysics of Pure Reason"
1978	Andrew Reck	"Being And Substance"
1979	John Compton	"Reinventing the Philosophy of Nature"
1980	Kenneth L. Schmitz	"A Moment of Truth: Present Actuality"
1981	Ivor Leclerc	"The Metaphysics of the Good"
1982	Thomas Langan	"A Strategy for the Pursuit of Truth"
1983	Richard T. De George	"Social Reality and Social Relations"
1984	Jude P. Dougherty	"Structure: Substantial and Other"
1985	R. M. Martin	"The Metaphysical Status of Mathematical Entities"
1986	George L. Kline	"Past, Present and Future as Categorical Terms and the Fallacy of the Actual Future"
1987	Edward Pols	"On Knowing Directly: The Actualization of First Philosophy"
1988	Richard Bernstein	"Metaphysics, Critique and Utopia"
1989	Robert Neville	"Value, Courage and Leadership"
1990	Robert Sokolowski	"The Question of Being"
1991	Stanley Rosen	"Is Metaphysics Possible"
1992	Mary T. Clark	"An Inquiry Into Personhood"
1993	Ralph McInerny	"The Science We Are Seeking"
1994	Donald Sherburne	"Some Reflections on Sartre's Nothingness and Whitehead's Perishing"
1995	William Desmond	"Being, Determination and Dialectic: On The Sources of Metaphysical Thinking"
1996	Sandra B. Rosenthal	"Self, Community, and Time: A Shared Sociality"
1997	John Lachs	"Valuational Species"
1998	Eugene Thomas Long	"Quest for Transcendence"
1999	Oliva Blanchette	"Suárez and the Latent Essentialism of Heidegger's Fundamental Ontology"
2000	George James Allan	"Perishable Goods"
2001	Jorge Gracia	"Are Categories Invented or Discovered? A Response to Foucault"
2002	James Felt	"Epochal Time and The Continuity of Experience"
2003	Vincent Colapietro	"Striving to Speak in a Human Voice: A Peircean Contribution to Metaphysical Discourse"
2004	Frederick Ferré	"The Practicality of Metaphysics"
2005	Nicholas Rescher	"Textuality, Reality and the Limits of Knowledge"
2006	John Wippel	"Thomas Aquinas on the Ultimate Question: Why Is There Anything at All Rather Than Nothing Whatsoever?"
2007	Lenn Goodman	"Value and the Dynamics of Being"
2008	Joseph Grange	"The Generosity of the Good"
2009	Donald Verene	"Metaphysics and the Origin of Culture"
2010	Dan Dahlstrom	"Being and Negation"
2011	Thomas R. Flynn	"Whatever Happened to Humanism? Reconciling the Being of Language and the Being of Man"
2012	Edward Halper	"Reason and the Rationality of Being"
2013	May Sim	"Metaphysics and Ethics, East and West"
2014	Alan White	"Rearticulating Being"
2015	Richard Dien Winfield	"Self-determination in Logic and Reality"
2016	George R. Lucas, Jr.	"Anaximander and the Ordering of Time"
2017	Nancy Frankenberry	"Consenting to Contingency After Rorty and Nagarjuna"
2018	Richard Velkley	"The Fate of Human Action: The Agency of 'Reason' in Modern Philosophy"
2019	Daniel Dombrowski	"Metaphysics, Political Philosophy, and the Process of Liberal Political Justification"
2020/2021	Lawrence Cahoone	"Towards an Ordinal Naturalism"
2022	Owen Goldin	"Symbolic Classification and the Emergence of a Metaphysics of Causality"
2023	David Weissman	"Presidential Roundtable with Tim Maudlin and Peter van Inwagen"
2024	Michael Baur	"Some Thoughts on the Identity and Difference of Knower and Known, and the Difference It Makes"
2025	John Stuhr	"Radical Empiricism and Animal Farm Naturalism"
