= Mark Dooley =

Irish journalist

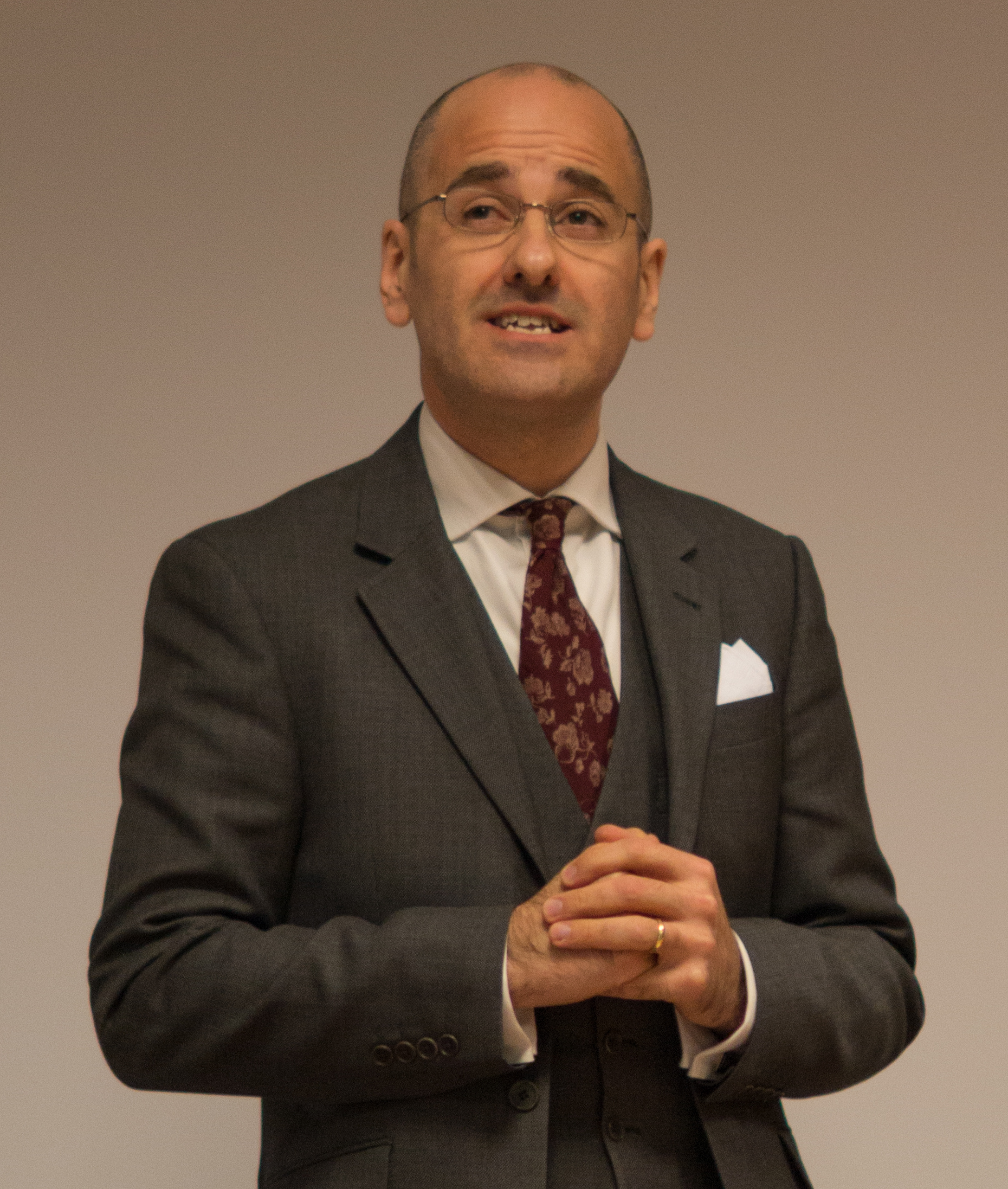
- Mark Dooley in 2013, giving a lecture in France
- Born: 12 January 1970 (age 56); Dublin, Ireland
- Occupations: Philosopher, writer
- Awards: John Henry Newman Scholar in Theology; 1999–2002

Education
- Education: University College Dublin, (BA, MA, PhD)

Philosophical work
- Era: Contemporary philosophy
- Region: Western philosophy
- Main interests: Philosophy, theology, religion
- Website: drmarkdooley.com

Mark Dooley (born 12 January 1970) is an Irish philosopher, writer and newspaper columnist. A specialist in continental philosophy, theology and the philosophy of religion, he is the author of several books, including The Politics of Exodus: Kierkegaard's Ethics of Responsibility (2001), Roger Scruton: The Philosopher of Dover Beach (2009), and Why Be a Catholic? (2011).

Dooley has written for several newspapers, including The Irish Times, and the Daily Mail.

== Early life and education ==
Dooley grew up in Dublin, where he attended the Synge Street CBS. He studied history and philosophy at University College Dublin (UCD), graduating with a BA in 1991 and obtaining his MA in philosophy in 1993. He earned his doctorate in philosophy in 1997, also from UCD, with a thesis on Kierkegaard; the thesis was published by Fordham University Press as The Politics of Exodus: Kierkegaard's Ethics of Responsibility (2001). In the course of his research on Kierkegaard, he was awarded a Hong Kierkegaard Fellowship at St Olaf College, Minnesota.

== Career ==
=== Academic positions ===
Dooley taught philosophy and theology at University College Dublin (UCD) from 1993, where he was a John Henry Newman Scholar in theology. He was a visiting lecturer in philosophy at Maynooth University in 1998 and 1999, and returned as lecturer between 2006 and 2011.

=== Writing and broadcasting ===
Dooley is a regular broadcaster on Ireland's national radio (RTÉ, Newstalk, Today FM). Since 2002, Dooley has contributed to The Irish Times, The Irish Independent, The Sunday Independent, The Irish Examiner, Prospect Magazine and The Dublin Magazine.

Between 2003 and 2006, he wrote a column on foreign affairs for the Sunday Independent. This column covered notably the conflict in the Middle East, the war in Iraq, and the use of Ireland as a European base for radical Islamist activities. Dooley reported on the headquartering in Ireland of several radical Islamic organisations (the Muslim Brotherhood, the European Council for Fatwa and Research and the International Union of Muslim Scholars).

Since 2006 Dooley has worked as a cultural and political columnist for the Irish Daily Mail. He is the author of the paper's 'Moral Matters' Wednesday column and also writes occasional 'Saturday Essays'.

Dooley lives in County Dublin with his wife and their three children.

== Works and themes ==
=== Søren Kierkegaard ===
In The Politics of Exodus: Kierkegaard's Ethics of Responsibility (2001), Dooley offers a new interpretation of Kierkegaard as a precursor of the ethical and political insights of Jacques Derrida. He argues that the connections between the two run much deeper than previously suggested. He shows Kierkegaard as being a proponent not of asocial individualism, but rather of the notion of an open quasi-community which has influenced Derrida's work.

=== Postmodern ethics and Christianity ===
Questioning Ethics: Contemporary Debates in Philosophy (1999), co-edited with Richard Kearney, is a major overview of debates about contemporary European ethical thought bringing together the world's foremost philosophers. Including original essays by Paul Ricoeur, Alasdair MacIntyre, Jürgen Habermas, Jacques Derrida and Karl-Otto Apel, it considers the challenges posed by ethics and the transformation of philosophy by critical thinking. It discusses contemporary ethical issues related to historiography, memory, revisionism, responsibility and justice, democracy, multiculturalism and the future of politics.

Questioning God (2001) comprises fifteen essays based on a conference organised by the editors (Mark Dooley, Michael J. Scanlon and John D. Caputo) at Villanova University in 1999. It explores contemporary thinking about God with special attention to the phenomenon of forgiveness. Contributors include John Milbank, Richard Kearney, Jean Greisch, Francis Schüssler Fiorenza, Kevin Hart and Jacques Derrida.

A Passion for the Impossible: John D. Caputo in Focus (2002) is the first detailed study of the works of John D. Caputo. It features contributions from Jacques Derrida, W. Norris Clarke, William J. Richardson, Merold Westphal, Thomas R. Flynn, Richard Kearney and Edith Wyschogrod. In particular, it includes an interview of Derrida by Mark Dooley which contains Derrida's definitive statement on religion: 'The Becoming Possible of the Impossible.'

=== Jacques Derrida ===
In 2007, Dooley co-authored The Philosophy of Derrida which presents the core philosophical ideas of Jacques Derrida and an appraisal of their impact. In this book, Derrida appears less as an iconoclast for whom deconstruction implies destruction than as a sensitive writer animated by a respect for institutions and a certain form of conservatism.

His correspondence with Derrida was included in the extensive archive of Derrida papers kept at the Institut mémoires de l'édition contemporaine near Caen, Lower Normandy, France.

=== Roger Scruton ===
Roger Scruton. The Philosopher of Dover Beach (2009) offers the first synoptic analysis of Roger Scruton's philosophical thought. In the book, Dooley brings out the core ideas contained in 40 books written by Scruton over four decades, and provides the philosophical background to understand their genesis and their articulation. The composition of the book is pedagogic in that each chapter builds on the concepts laid in the previous one. The different chapters of this book then explore the genealogy of Scruton's thought and the various themes running through his works: personhood, sex and the sacred; aesthetics; Scruton's conservatism and its economic, legal and environmental implications; and the defence of the nation state in the face of liberal internationalism.

The Roger Scruton Reader, its companion volume, is a collection of texts by Scruton which Dooley selected, edited and introduced. They are grouped into the following categories: conservatism, the nation, sex and the sacred, culture, and one Dooley calls 'homecomings' and which contains texts on conserving nature, the philosophy of wine, and hunting. The volume also includes a previously unpublished article by Scruton about architecture entitled "Classicism Now."

In Conversations with Roger Scruton, published by Bloomsbury in 2016, Dooley sheds new light on hitherto overlooked areas of Scruton's life and thought.

=== Crisis in the Irish Catholic Church ===
After exposing - at the request of seminarians and of the Irish Daily Mail - the sources of the moral crisis in Ireland's national seminary, Dooley received overwhelming support from the public and from the Church, and was asked by priests from various countries to write a book in which he would articulate the way forward for the Irish Catholic Church : Why be a Catholic? (2011).

On 22 November 2013, he was invited as guest of honour at the University of Caen Lower Normandy, France, where he was asked to give the keynote lecture about the current situation of the Irish Catholic Church. His lecture was entitled "Reclaiming the Irish Church."

=== Technology, self and the world ===
Moral Matters. A Philosophy of Homecoming (2015) is loosely based on his weekly column in the Irish Daily Mail. It is a philosophical work about home and rootedness, memory and identity, loss and love. Analyzing the alienation experienced by the self when disengaging from the social sphere surrounding it, Dooley shows how the self can become re-rooted to time and place and restored to full humanity whilst moving in the virtual, hyperconnected world.

== Bibliography ==
- Questioning Ethics: Contemporary Debates in Philosophy (London: Routledge, 1999), co-edited with Richard Kearney
- The Politics of Exodus: Kierkegaard's Ethics of Responsibility (Fordham University Press, 2001)
- Questioning God (Bloomington: Indiana University Press, 2001; ISBN 978-0253214744), edited with Michael J. Scanlon and John D. Caputo.
- A Passion for the Impossible: John D. Caputo in Focus (Albany: SUNY Press, 2003; ISBN 978-0791456880)
- Jacques Derrida, On Cosmopolitanism and Forgiveness (2001), translated with Michael Hughes
- The Philosophy of Derrida (London: Acumen Press, 2006; Montreal: McGill-Queen's University Press, 2007), co-authored with Liam Kavanagh
- Roger Scruton: The Philosopher of Dover Beach (London & New York: Continuum, 2009)
- The Roger Scruton Reader (London & New York: Continuum, 2009)
- Why Be a Catholic? (London & New York: Continuum, 2011)
- Moral Matters. A Philosophy of Homecoming (London & New York: Bloomsbury, 2015)
- Conversations with Roger Scruton (London & New York: Bloomsbury, 2016)
