= John F. Wippel =

American Catholic priest and philosopher (1933–2023)

The Reverend Monsignor John F. Wippel
- Born: John Francis Wippel; August 21, 1933; Pomeroy, Ohio, US
- Died: September 11, 2023 (aged 90); Washington, DC

Ecclesiastical career
- Religion: Christianity (Roman Catholic)
- Church: Latin Church
- Ordained: 1960 (priest)

Academic background
- Education: Catholic University of America; Catholic University of Leuven
- Doctoral advisor: Fernand van Steenberghen

Academic work
- Discipline: Philosophy
- Sub-discipline: Metaphysics
- School or tradition: Thomism
- Institutions: Catholic University of America
- Main interests: Metaphysics, Aquinas, Medieval philosophy

John Francis Wippel (21 August 1933 — 11 September 2023) was an American Catholic priest of the Diocese of Steubenville. He was a leading authority on the metaphysical thought of Thomas Aquinas. He won the Cardinal Mercier Prize for International Philosophy in 1981, two National Endowment for the Humanities Fellowships, and was named a Professor of the Pontifical Academy of Saint Thomas Aquinas. At the time of his death, he was serving as the Theodore Basselin Professor of Philosophy at the Catholic University of America in Washington, DC.

== Biography ==
Wippel was born on 21 August 1933 in Pomeroy, Ohio. He received his degrees of Bachelor of Arts (1955) and Master of Arts (1956) in philosophy from the Catholic University of America while he was a seminarian at Theological College. He was ordained a priest on 28 May 1960.

After also earning a Licentiate in Sacred Theology in 1960, Wippel then pursued a Doctorate of Philosophy at the Catholic University of Louvain under the direction of Fernand van Steenberghen. He submitted his thesis after only two years and received the grade of the very highest distinction (summa cum laude). He was invited to pursue the Maître Agrégé of the École Saint-Thomas-d'Aquin at the Université catholique de Louvain, where he later studied and completed his degree in 1981 on the metaphysical thought of Godfrey of Fontaines.

Wippel died on September 11, 2023.

== Faculty positions ==
- 1960-1961 and 1963–1965, Instructor in the School of Philosophy, Catholic University of America
- 1965-1967, Assistant Professor, Catholic University of America
- 1967-1972, Associate Professor, Catholic University of America
- 1972-2023, Ordinary Professor, School of Philosophy, Catholic University of America
- Spring 1969, Visiting Associate Professor, University of California, San Diego
- Theodore Basselin Professor of Philosophy, 2001-2023

== Awards and distinctions ==
- Basselin Scholarship (CUA), 1953–1956
- Penfield Scholarship (CUA) 1961-1963 (for doctoral studies at Louvain)
- National Endowment for the Humanities Younger Humanist Fellowship, 1970–1971
- Maître-Agrégé from Louvain-la-Neuve (see above)
- Cardinal Mercier Prize from Louvain, May 1981, for best book on a metaphysical theme in the previous two years (see The Metaphysical Thought of Godfrey of Fontaines)
- National Endowment for the Humanities Fellowship for Independent Study and Research (1984–1985 academic year)
- Aquinas Medal 1999. American Catholic Philosophical Association
- The Catholic University of America's Alumni Association Achievement Award for Research and Scholarship, October 27, 2001.
- Pontifical Academy of Saint Thomas Aquinas, Fellow (Professor Ordinarius), 8 February 2003.
- Doctorate of Letters in Mediaeval Studies honoris causa, conferred by the Pontifical Institute of Mediaeval Studies, Toronto, October 1, 2005.
- The Catholic University of America Provost Award. Life Time Excellence. Scholarship, Research and Teaching, May 4, 2006.

== Select publications ==
=== Books ===
- The Metaphysical Thought of Godfrey of Fontaines: A Study in Late Thirteenth-Century Philosophy (Washington: Catholic University of America Press, 1981)
- Metaphysical Themes in Thomas Aquinas (Washington: Catholic University of America Press, 1984)
- Boethius of Dacia: On the Supreme Good, On the Eternity of the World, On Dreams (1987)
- Medieval Reactions to the Encounter between Faith and Reason (1995)
- The Metaphysical Thought of Thomas Aquinas (Washington: Catholic University of America Press, 2000)
- Metaphysical Themes in Thomas Aquinas II (Washington: Catholic University of America Press, 2007)
- Metaphysical Themes in Thomas Aquinas III (Washington: Catholic University of America Press, 2020)

=== Articles ===
- “Thomas Aquinas and the Unity of Substantial Form.” In Philosophy and Theology in the Long Middle Ages: A Tribute to Stephen F. Brown, edited by Kent Emery, Jr., Russell L. Friedman, and Andreas Speer, 117–54. Leiden and Boston: Brill, 2011.
- “Godfrey of Fontaines at the University of Paris in the Last Quarter of the Thirteenth Century. In Nach der Verurteilung von 1277: Philosophie und Theologie an der Universität von Paris im letzten Viertel des 13. Jahrhunderts, Studien und Texte, edited by Jan Aertsen, Kent Emery, and Andreas Speer, 359–89. Miscellanea Mediaevalia 28. Berlin and New York: Walter de Gruyter, 2001.
- “Thomas Aquinas and the Condemnation of 1277.” The Modern Schoolman 72 (1995): 233–72.
- “Thomas Aquinas on the Distinction and Derivation of the Many from the One: A Dialectic between Being and Nonbeing.” The Review of Metaphysics 38 (1985): 563–90.
- “Godfrey of Fontaines and the Act-Potency Axiom.” Journal of the History of Philosophy 11 (1973): 299–317.

Professional and academic associations
Preceded by Marilyn McCord Adams	President of the Society for Medieval and Renaissance Philosophy; 1983–1984	Succeeded by James F. Ross
Preceded by Nicholas Rescher	President of the Metaphysical Society of America; 2006	Succeeded by Lenn E. Goodman
