= Joseph Grange =

American philosopher (1940–2014)

- Born: February 7, 1940
- Died: July 20, 2014 (aged 74)
- Spouse: Claudine Grange

Education
- Education: Fordham University (Ph.D.)
- Thesis: Tragic Value in the Thought of Alfred North Whitehead (1970)
- Doctoral advisor: ×

Philosophical work
- Era: 21st century Philosophy
- Region: Western philosophy
- School: Pragmatism
- Main interests: Metaphysics

Joseph Grange (February 7, 1940 – July 20, 2014) was an American philosopher and Professor of Philosophy at the University of Southern Maine. He was president of the Metaphysical Society of America (2007–2008).

== Books ==
- John Dewey, Confucius, and Global Philosophy (Suny Series in Chinese Philosophy and Culture), SUNY
- The City: An Urban Cosmology and Nature: An Environmental Cosmology, SUNY
- Nature: An Environmental Cosmology
- Metaphysics and Culture
- Soul: A Spiritual Cosmology
- Being and Dialectic: Metaphysics as a Cultural Presence, coeditor (with William Desmond), SUNY
