= Jude Patrick Dougherty =

American philosopher (1930–2021)

Jude P. Dougherty KSG
- Born: July 21, 1930; Chicago, Illinois, U.S.
- Died: March 6, 2021 (aged 90); Potomac, Maryland, U.S.
- Occupation: Philosopher
- Spouse: Patricia Ann Regan (m. 1957)

Jude Patrick Dougherty KSG (July 21, 1930 – March 6, 2021) was an American philosopher, Dean Emeritus of the School of Philosophy at the Catholic University of America, and Editor-in-Chief for 44 years of The Review of Metaphysics.

== Personal life ==
Jude was born in Chicago, Illinois, to Edward Timothy Dougherty and Cecelia Anastasia Loew. His sister was Inez Juanita Bowling. While a student at Catholic University, Jude met Patricia Ann Regan, who was studying nursing. On December 28, 1957, Jude and Patricia were married at St. Anthony's Catholic Church in Hoopeston, Illinois, and were married 62 years before Patricia's death on December 8, 2020. Together, they had four sons and ten grandchildren. He died on March 6, 2021, in Potomac, Maryland. A Mass of Christian Burial took place on March 15, 2021, at the National Shrine of the Immaculate Conception in Washington, D.C. The sermon was held by Msgr. Robert Sokolowski.

== Career ==
In 1954, Jude earned his bachelor's degree from Catholic University, followed by a Master of Arts in 1955. He was subsequently an instructor at Marquette University, as well as Bellarmine College. In 1960, Jude received his Doctor of Philosophy from Catholic University in Washington, D.C. Dougherty was an assistant and associate professor at Bellarmine College from 1960 to 1966. From 1966 to 1976, Dougherty was an associate professor, and a professor from 1976 onwards at Catholic University. He was a visiting professor from 1974 to 1975 at Katholieke Universiteit te Leuven in Belgium. In 1967, Dougherty was named the first lay dean of the School of Philosophy at the Catholic University of America, a position he held for over 30 years. In December 1971, Jude became editor-in-chief of The Review of Metaphysics, a position he held for 44 years. Over 900 articles were published during his tenure, one of the longest-running editorships of a prestigious journal in history.

Dougherty's acquaintance and subsequent friendship with Polish prelate Cardinal Karol Wojtyła, a fellow philosopher, led to an invitation for the Cardinal to lecture at Catholic University in July 1976. Cardinal Wojtyła would become Pope John Paul II (and later Saint) in 1978, and visited Catholic University again in 1979.

Dougherty's published works include The Logic of Religion; The Good Life and its Pursuit; The Nature of Scientific Explanation; Wretched Aristotle: Using the Past to Rescue the Future; Western Creed, Western Identity: Essays in Legal and Social Philosophy; Jacques Maritain: An Intellectual Profile; Briefly Considered; Interpretations; Approaches to Morality; The Impact of Vatican II; The Theological Directions of the Ecumenical Movement; Recent American Naturalism: An Exposition and Critique; and Religion - Gesellschaft - Demokratie: Ausgewählte Aufsätze. In addition, Dougherty wrote numerous essays on various contemporary and philosophical topics over the years.

Dougherty held many leadership positions in multiple organizations. He was President of the American Catholic Philosophical Association (1974–75), President of the Society for Philosophy of Religion (1978–79) and President of the Metaphysical Society of America (1983–84). Dougherty was an emeritus member of the Pontifical Academy of St. Thomas Aquinas since 1980. He was also a member of the American Philosophical Association (Program Chairman Eastern Division 1988, Executive Committee Eastern Division 1989–93), the Fellowship of Catholic Scholars (Executive Secretary 1994–97, Treasurer 1994–97), and the European Academy of Sciences and Arts since 1991. He was also the Founder and President-elect of the Kentucky Philosophy Association (1966), and President of the Washington Philosophy Club (1968–69). Dougherty was a trustee at Bellarmine College from 1972 to 1975, and the University of Bridgeport from 1995 to 1999. He was also a member of the board of advisors for the Franklin J. Matchette Foundation since 1971.

== Positions ==
- Emeritus member, Pontifical Academy of St. Thomas Aquinas, since 1980
- President, American Catholic Philosophical Association, 1974–75
- President, Society for Philosophy of Religion, 1978–79
- President, Metaphysical Society of America, 1983–84
- Founder and President-elect, Kentucky Philosophy Association, 1966
- President, Washington Philosophy Club, 1968–69
- American Philosophical Association (Program Chairman Eastern Division 1988, Executive Committee Eastern Division 1989–93)
- Fellowship of Catholic Scholars (Executive Secretary 1994–97, Treasurer 1994–97)
- General Series Editor, Studies in Philosophy and the History of Philosophy, The Catholic University of America
- Trustee, Bellarmine College, 1972–75
- Trustee, University of Bridgeport, 1995–99
- Board of Advisors member, Franklin J. Matchette Foundation, since 1971
- Member, European Academy of Sciences and Arts

== Honors ==
- Knight of the Order of St. Gregory the Great, 1999
- President's Medal, The Catholic University of America, 1999
- Cardinal Wright Award, Fellowship of Catholic Scholars, 1994
- Aquinas Medal, American Catholic Philosophical Association, 1994
- Cardinal Gibbons Medal, The Catholic University of America Alumni Association
- Special Recognition Award, Graduate Student Association and the Undergraduate Student Government, The Catholic University of America, 1998
- Jacques Maritain Scholarly Excellence Award, American Maritain Association, 2000
- Fides et Ratio Lifetime Achievement Award, American Maritain Association, 2005
- Doctor of Humane Letters, Honoris Causa, The Catholic University of Lublin, 2000
- Doctor of Humane Letters, Honoris Causa, Thomas More College, 1995

== Books ==
- Recent American Naturalism, Washington, D.C.: The Catholic University of America Press, 1960
- The Theological Directions of the Ecumenical Movement, Louisville, KY: Bellarmine College Press, 1964
- The Impact of Vatican II, St. Louis: Herder, 1966
- Approaches to Morality, with L. Dupré et al., New York: Harcourt, Brace and World, 1966
- The Good Life and Its Pursuit, New York: Paragon, 1984
- Western Creed, Western Identity, Washington, D.C.: The Catholic University of America Press, 2000
- The Logic of Religion, Washington, DC: The Catholic University of America Press, 2002
- Jacques Maritain: An Intellectual Profile, Washington, DC: The Catholic University of America Press, 2003
- The Nature of Scientific Explanation, Washington, D.C.: The Catholic University of America Press, 2013
- Interpretations: Reading the Present in Light of the Past, Washington, D.C.: The Catholic University of America Press, 2018
- Religion - Gesellschaft - Demokratie: Augewahlte Aufsatze, Berlin: Duncker & Humblot, 2003 (Band 16 of the series Soziale Orientierung)

== Essays and Articles ==
- ‘Lessons from the History of Science and Technology’, Studies in Philosophy and the History of Philosophy, vol. IV, ed. by John K. Ryan. Washington, D.C.: The Catholic University of America Press, 1969
- ‘The Finding of Law’, Proceedings, American Catholic Philosophical Association, vol. XLIX, 1975, pp. 1–12
- ‘Determining Moral Norms’, Proceedings, American Catholic Philosophical Association, 1978, pp. 39–51
- ‘Potentiality: From Aristotle to Rescher and Back’, Studies in Honor of Nicholas Rescher, Dordrecht: Reidel Publishing Co., 1979, pp. 109–122
- ‘The Uses of History in Teaching Philosophy’, Teaching Philosophy, 1979, pp. 13–21
- ‘The Work Ethic of John Paul II’, Papal Economics, The Heritage Foundation, vol. VI, 1981, pp. 1–7
- ‘The Notion of “Entitlement” in Human Rights Debate’, Human Rights: Abstracts of Papers from the Tenth Interamerican Congress of Philosophy, October 18–23, 1981, Tallahassee: The Florida State University
- ‘Intellectuals with Dirt Under Their Fingernails: Attitudes Toward Science and Technology and the Difference They Make’, Communio, Fall 1982, pp. 225–237
- ‘Maritain on Church and State’, Communio, Winter 1982, pp. 389–403
- ‘Toward a Thomistic Philosophy of Religion’, Proceedings, American Catholic Philosophical Association, 1983, pp. 105–115
- ‘Keeping the Common Good in Mind’, Studi Tomistici, vol. XXV, The Ethics of St. Thomas Aquinas, Pontificia Academia di S. Tommaso, pp. 188–201
- ‘Von Ketteler, Leo XIII and John Paul II on the “Social Question”’, Catholicism in Crisis, April 1985, pp. 24-31, also published in Servo Veritatis, Uniwersytet Jagiellonski, vol. CCXXIX, 1988, pp. 179-196
- ‘The Thomistic Element in the Social Philosophy of John Paul II’, Proceedings, American Catholic Philosophical Association, 1986; ‘The Interior Life’, Crisis, May 1987, pp. 19–23
- ‘Aquinas on Punishment’, Studi Tomistici, vol. XXX, 1987, Libreria Vaticana, pp. 157–170
- ‘Separating Church and State’, The World and I, vol. II, no. 12, December 1987, pp. 675–687
- ‘John Paul II's Global Village’, The World and I, vol. III, no. 7, 1988, pp. 663–670
- ‘Episcopal Authority and the Teaching of Morality’, Creative Love: The Ethics of Human Reproduction, ed. by John F. Boyle, Front Royal, VA: Christendom Press, 1989, pp. 197–214
- ‘Shifting Philosophical Sand and Legal Structures’, The Personalist Forum, vol. IV, no. 2, Fall 1989, pp. 1–19
- ‘Collective Guilt’, The American Journal of Jurisprudence, vol. XXXV, 1990, pp. 1–14
- ‘Abstraction and Imagination in Human Understanding’, L’atto aristotelico e le sue ermeneutiche, Roma: 1990, pp. 1–14
- ‘What Was Religion?’, Modern Age, Vol. XXXIII, no. 2, Summer 1990, pp. 113–121, reprinted: Vital Speeches, vol. LVII, no. 10, March 1, 1991, pp. 316–320
- ‘On the Justification of Rights Claims’, Collana Dialogo di Filosofia, no. 8, Herder Università Lateranense, Roma: 1991, pp. 1–14
- ‘The Necessity of Punishment’, The World and I, vol. VIII, no. 1, January 1993, pp. 557–569
- ‘Accountability without Causality: Tort Litigation Reaches Fairy Tale Levels’, Catholic University Law Review, vol. XXXXI, no. 1, Fall 1991, pp. 1–18
- ‘Christian Philosophy: Sociological Category or Oxymoron’, The Monist, vol. LXXV, no. 3, 1992, pp. 283–290
- ‘Edith Stein: The Convert in Search of Illumination’, Crisis, December 1992, pp. 39–43
- ‘Maritain at the Cliff's Edge: From Antimoderne to Le Paysan’, Crisis, November 1994, pp. 40–45
- ‘One Hundred Years of Philosophy at The Catholic University of America’, Fellowship of Catholic Scholars Newsletter vol. XIX, no. 1, December 1995
- ‘Thomism’, Encyclopedia of Applied Ethics, San Diego, CA: Academic Press, vol. 4, pp. 365–372, 1998
- ‘Professional Responsibility’, The World and I, October 1996, pp. 321–333
- ‘The Failure of Positivism and the Enduring Legacy of Comte’, in Recovering Nature, ed. by J.P. O’Callaghan, T.S. Hibbs, Notre Dame, IN: University of Notre Dame Press, 1999
- ‘Indestructible Islam’, Modern Age, Fall, 2002, pp. 324–332
- ‘Wretched Aristotle’, Homiletic & Pastoral Review, August–September 2003, pp. 20–27
- ‘Does National Identity Matter’, The World & I, March 2004
- ‘The Fortunes of the Berlin (Humboldt) University in America and the Future of Western Philosophy’, in Erfurter Universitatsreden, ed. Wolfgang Bergsdorf, 2004
- ‘The Ontology of the Artifact’, Homiletic & Pastoral Review, February 2006, pp. 17–21
- ‘The Fragility of Democracy’, Modern Age, Spring 2006, pp. 119–129; ‘A Rational Preamble’, Homiletic & Pastoral Review, June 2006, pp. 20–23
- ‘Aristotle in North America’, Fenomenologia e Società, n. 1/2006 anno XXIX, pp. 135–142, 2006
- ‘Phenomenology as Ancilla Theologiae’, Angelicum, Vol. 82 (No. 2), 2005, pp. 389–398
- ‘National Identity’, in Nationale und Kulturelle Identitat im Zeitalter der Globalisierung, ed. Anton Rauscher, Berlin: Duncker & Humblot, 2006, pp. 13–23
- ‘Newman vs. Humboldt and the Vision of Leo XIII’, in Human Nature in Its Wholeness: A Roman Catholic Perspective, ed. Daniel N. Robinson et al., Washington, DC: The Catholic University of America Press, 2006, pp. 182–193.
- 'Property as a Condition of Liberty', in: Fellowship of Catholic Scholars Quarterly Summer 2011, pp. 10–13

== Media ==
Dougherty was a friend of Pope John Paul II for 30 years. In 2005 upon his death, Dougherty discussed the legacy of Pope John Paul II on CNN's Larry King Live, Fox News Channel, BBC World television, WJLA-TV and was interviewed by the Washington Post, Newhouse News Service, Scripps Howard News Service, Knight Ridder Tribune News Service Voice of America radio, the Washington Blade, the Sunday Bulletin, and the Fresno Bee.
