= George James Allan =

American philosopher

- Born: 1935 (age 90–91)

Education
- Education: Yale University (Ph.D.); Grinnell College (B.A.)

Philosophical work
- Era: 21st-century philosophy
- Region: Western philosophy
- Institutions: Dickinson College

George James Allan, also known as George J Allan or just George Allan, (born 1935) is an American philosopher and former Professor of Philosophy and Dean of the College at Dickinson College. He is also a former president of the Metaphysical Society of America (2000-2001). He received his bachelor's degree from Grinnell College, his master's in systematic theology from Union Theological Seminary, and his Ph.D. in philosophy from Yale University.

== Works ==
His body of works are:

The Importances of the Past: A Meditation on the Authority of Tradition(1985)

The Realizations of the Future :An Inquiry into the Authority of Praxis(1990)

The Patterns of the Present :Interpreting the Authority of Form(2001)

Higher Education in the Making Pragmatism, Whitehead, and the Canon(2004)

Comments on Ferré's "The Practicality of Metaphysics"(2005)

Modes of Learning: Whitehead's Metaphysics and the Stages of Education(2013)

Neville’s Ontological Ultimate: A Bridge Too Far(2015)
