= William T. Blackstone =

American academic (1931–1977)

- Born: William Thomas Blackstone, Jr. December 8, 1931; Augusta, Georgia, United States
- Died: November 14, 1977 (aged 45); Athens, Georgia
- Occupation: Academic

Academic background
- Education: Duke University (PhD)
- Thesis: The Ethics of Francis Hutcheson (1957)

Academic work
- Institutions: University of Georgia

William Thomas Blackstone, Jr. (December 8, 1931 – November 14, 1977) was an American academic and philosopher.

A graduate of Elon College and Duke University, Blackstone established himself as a career academic at the University of Florida and University of Georgia. He stayed with the latter until his death, leading its philosophy department from 1964 until 1972 and holding other key academic positions within the university. He served on the editorial boards of prominent and regional philosophical journals and held presidencies of various professional groups, alongside serving on the Executive Committee of the American Philosophical Association.

Throughout his life, Blackstone published several books and articles on topics relating to the philosophy of religion, ethics, and the concept of freedom. He saw praise for his work during his life, gaining three awards from the Southern Society for Philosophy and Psychology as well as various awards from the University of Georgia. Following his death, his work was recognised by a memorial issue of Social Theory and Practice and dedications from his contemporaries in other works.

== Early life and education ==
Blackstone was born on December 8, 1931, in Augusta, Georgia. He studied his undergraduate degree at Elon College, graduating in 1953. While there, he took part in several sports, including tennis and basketball. He was the college's joint-lead punter during 1951 and 1952, and was ranked the best receiver in the American football program for 1952. He became a letterman for his participation in the team.

He later studied at Duke University, receiving an MA in 1955 and a PhD in 1957. While there, he became friends with Kai Nielsen: despite disagreeing politically, both had an interest in John Rawls' A Theory of Justice.

== Career ==
Following his PhD, Blackstone joined Elon College's philosophy department for one year, before joining the University of Florida as Assistant Professor of Philosophy, where he stayed until 1961. He then joined the University of Georgia as Assistant Professor of Philosophy, leading the department from 1964 until 1972. He served as Chairman of the Division of Social Sciences from 1969 and became Research Professor of Philosophy in 1975, holding both positions until his death.

In 1975, Blackstone held a seminar for the National Endowment for the Humanities, focusing on "justice and equality" in John Rawls' philosophy.

=== Writing ===
In 1963, Blackstone published The Problem of Religious Knowledge, in which Tad S. Clements says he "attempts [...] to apply criteria of cognitivity and of warranted assertability to religious utterances". In 1965, he published a book on Francis Hutcheson titled Francis Hutcheson and Contemporary Ethical Theory. It contains detailed analysis of Hutcheson's beliefs, as well as comparisons with Richard Price and various twentieth-century philosophers.

In 1969, he published a collection of essays titled The Concept of Equality, featuring writing by Isaiah Berlin, Bernard Williams, John Plamenatz, Andrew J. Reck, Herbert Spiegelberg, and Monroe Beardsley. John Howie praised the book for its wide range of views on equality, saying "it is a pleasure to recommend this book to all who have a serious concern for equality, its theory and practice". In the same year, Blackstone and George L. Newsome edited Education and Ethics, a collection of eight essays presented at a University of Georgia symposium. In Philosophy & Rhetoric, John Waite Bowers found little relevance outside of the essays by Frederick A. Olafson and Anthony A. Nemetz, stating "the other essays are so innocuous that no such human judgment is necessary".

From 18 to 20 February 1971, the University of Georgia held the Fourth Annual Conference in Philosophy. The conference, organized by Blackstone, was the first ever philosophical conference on environmental ethics, A collection of the papers presented was published in 1974, given the title Philosophy & Environmental Crisis. The conference featured talks from Blackstone and fellow philosophers Joel Feinberg, Charles Hartshorne, Walter H. O'Briant, Nicholas Rescher, Robert G. Burton, and Pete A. Y. Gunter, as well as biologist Eugene Odum. Writing in Journal of Thought, J. M. Riteris notes that Blackstone's essay had been published in The Southern Journal of Philosophy prior to the book's release. A review published in Ecology Law Quarterly argued that "although it has little new thought or information, Philosophy and Environmental Crisis provides an understanding of the conceptual dimensions of the environmental crisis".

In 1972, Blackstone and Robert H. Ayers edited a series of papers titled Religious Language and Knowledge, the essays being the outcome of the University of Georgia's 1965 "Great Thinkers Forum". Writing in Review of Religious Research, Tracy R. Gran criticized the book for "seem[ing] more dogmatic and logological than analytic" and failing to "establish a frame of reference for the critical analysis of religious language and knowledge". Thomas McPherson also criticized the book, noting the lack of explanation over the seven-year publication delay and arguing that "most of the material deals with rather familiar themes in a not markedly new way".

Blackstone served on the editorial boards of many journals, including:

- The Philosopher's Index (1967)
- Journal of Social Philosophy
- The Southern Journal of Philosophy
- Social Theory and Practice
- Environmental Ethics (served on the Editorial Advisory Board during its preparatory period)

=== Memberships ===
Blackstone held posts in the following professional groups:

- American Philosophical Association Eastern Division (Vice President, 1960–61)
- Georgia Philosophical Society (President, 1966–7)
- Southeastern Philosophy of Education Society (President, 1968–9)
- Southern Society for Philosophy and Psychology (Secretary/Treasurer, 1969–72; President, 1974–5)
- American Society for Value Inquiry (Secretary/Treasurer, 1972–5; President, 1975–6)

From 1973 until 1976, he served on the Executive Committee of the American Philosophical Association. He served on its Committee on Defense of Professional Rights. He was also a member of the American section of the International Association for Philosophy of Law and Social Philosophy.

== Philosophy ==
Blackstone's early writing focused on religious knowledge and religious language, as well as normative ethics and metaethics. His later works concerned the real-life application of theories of justice and equality.

According to Gene G. James, Blackstone's believed that

philosophy differs from the sciences because it deals with the conceptual and normative problems which cannot be solved by scientific methods, and because it treats the assumptions of the sciences as themselves problematic. However, like science, it has as one of its ultimate goals, truth about human beings, society, and the world. Blackstone thus rejects the view of philosophy as consisting of conceptual analysis alone.

James argues that Blackstone's work "is both an expression of, and an attempt to extend, human freedom".

=== Ethics ===
Blackstone rejected both utilitarian and Kantian ethics, saying:

It seems to me that an adequate ethic must include a number of moral principles—utility, justice or fairness, and benevolence—and it must be recognized that on some occasions these principles simply conflict.

According to Gene G. James, Blackstone believed the best ethical theories are those which "further the growth and development of humans as rational, social beings".

=== Human nature ===
Blackstone rejected the idea that humans have a fixed nature, believing that "the attempt to provide an ontological foundation for a certain concept of human nature via the notion of essence is a surreptitious or disguised moral judgment". Gene G. James argues that he sees choice and the possibility of growth as integral to human existence: "he believes that man to a great extent makes himself". James compares these ideas to those of John Dewey, who also noted the importance of growth and freedom.

=== Political philosophy ===
Blackstone believed that people must live in a democracy if they are to reach the "fullest sense of freedom".

== Personal life ==
Blackstone was married to Jean, with whom he had children named Lisa and Jeff. He died of cancer on November 14, 1977.

Blackstone continued playing tennis after college and was a "formidable competitor", finding success in amateur competition.

== Awards and recognition ==
Blackstone received the Southern Society for Philosophy and Psychology's annual award for the best research paper each year from 1959 until 1961. In 1965, he received the M. G. Michael award from the University of Georgia. Before his death, Blackstone had been selected to receive the Outstanding Honors Professor Award at the University of Georgia.

=== Legacy ===
Following his death, the University of Georgia established the William T. Blackstone Scholarship Fund to provide scholarships for "outstanding undergraduates".

In 1978, Richard T. De George and Joseph A. Pichler dedicated their book Ethics, Free Enterprise, and Public Policy to Blackstone. The following year, the journal Social Theory and Practice published a memorial issue to Blackstone. The articles were published by his friends and colleagues, and concerned topics he had written about through his career. He received a further memorial in the first issue of Environmental Ethics, written by his colleague Walter H. O'Briant.

== Selected works ==
=== Articles ===
- Blackstone, William Thomas (1958). "Objective Emotivism". The Journal of Philosophy. 55 (24): 1054–1062. doi:10.2307/2021941. ISSN 0022-362X. JSTOR 2021941.
- Blackstone, William T. (1959). "Nietzschean Ethics and Biology". Theoria: A Journal of Social and Political Theory (13): 52–53. ISSN 0040-5817. JSTOR 41801139.
- Blackstone, William T. (1960). "Biology and Ethics". Theoria: A Journal of Social and Political Theory (14): 23–28. ISSN 0040-5817. JSTOR 41801145.
- Blackstone, William T. (1964). "Thomism and Metaethics". The Thomist: A Speculative Quarterly Review. 28 (2): 225–246. doi:10.1353/tho.1964.0020. ISSN 2473-3725. S2CID 171510093.
- Blackstone, W. T. (1968). "The Ethics of Faculty-Administration Relationships". The Georgia Review. 22 (3): 273–288. ISSN 0016-8386. JSTOR 41396465.
- "Review of The Alienation Of Reason". The Georgia Review. 23 (3): 402–405. 1969. ISSN 0016-8386. JSTOR 41396653.
- Blackstone, William T. (1973). "The Concept of Political Freedom". Social Theory and Practice. 2 (4): 421–438. doi:10.5840/soctheorpract1973249. ISSN 0037-802X. JSTOR 23558901.
- Blackstone, William T. (1975). "Freedom and Women". Ethics. 85 (3): 243–248. doi:10.1086/291962. ISSN 0014-1704. JSTOR 2380052. S2CID 145480668.
- Blackstone, William T. (1975). "Reverse Discrimination and Compensatory Justice". Social Theory and Practice. 3 (3): 253–288. doi:10.5840/soctheorpract1975335. ISSN 0037-802X. JSTOR 23557736.
- Blackstone, William T. (1977). "The Environment and Ethics". The Hastings Center Report. 7 (6): 16–18. doi:10.2307/3560892. ISSN 0093-0334. JSTOR 3560892.

=== Books ===
- The Problem of Religious Knowledge: The Impact of Philosophical Analysis on the Question of Religious Knowledge. Prentice-Hall. 1963.
- Francis Hutcheson and Contemporary Ethical Theory. University of Georgia Press. 1964.
- The Concept of Equality. Burgess Publishing Company. 1969. (Editor)
- Education and Ethics. University of Georgia Press. 1969. (Editor with George L. Newsome)
- Religious Language and Knowledge. University of Georgia Press. 1972. ISBN 9780820302690. (Editor with Robert H. Ayers)
- Philosophy & Environmental Crisis. University of Georgia Press. 1974. ISBN 9780820303437. (Editor)
- Social Justice & Preferential Treatment: Women and Racial Minorities in Education and Business. University of Georgia Press. 1977. ISBN 9780820304212. (Editor with Robert D. Heslep)
