= Hywel Lewis =

Welsh theologian and philosopher (1910-1992)

- Lewis in 1973
- Born: Hywel David Lewis; 21 May 1910; Llandudno, Wales
- Died: 6 April 1992 (aged 81); Normandy, Guildford, England
- Spouse(s): Megan Jones (m. 1943; d. 1962) (Kate Alice) Megan Pritchard (m. 1965)
- Relatives: Alun Tudor Lewis (brother)

Academic background
- Education: University College of North Wales (B.A., 1932; M.A., 1934); Jesus College, Oxford (BLitt, 1935)
- Influences: H. A. Prichard, W. D. Ross

Academic work
- Discipline: Philosophy, theology
- Sub-discipline: Political philosophy, ethics, philosophy of religion
- Institutions: University College of North Wales, King's College London

Hywel David Lewis (21 May 1910 – 6 April 1992) was a Welsh theologian and philosopher. He was best known for his defence of dualism and personal survival.

== Life ==
Lewis was born in Llandudno, Wales, and educated at Caernarfon grammar school, the University College of North Wales, Bangor (graduating with a first-class degree in philosophy in 1932 and an M.A. in 1934), and Jesus College, Oxford (graduating with a BLitt in 1935).

He was then a lecturer in philosophy at Bangor, becoming professor in 1947. In 1955, he was appointed Professor of the History and Philosophy of Religion at the University of London, retiring in 1977.

His works included Morals and the New Theology (1947), Morals and Revelation (1951), Our Experience of God (1959), The Elusive Mind (1969), The Self and Immortality (1973), Persons and Life after Death (1978) and The Elusive Self (1982). He also published in Welsh. His interest in comparative religion led to his becoming founding editor of the journal Religious Studies, holding the post from 1964 to 1979. He edited the Muirhead Library of Philosophy from 1947 to 1978. He also served as president of the Aristotelian Society from 1962 to 1963, and as chairman of the council of the Royal Institute of Philosophy from 1965 to 1968.

He died on 6 April 1992 and was buried at St Tudno's church on the Great Orme.

== Philosophical writings ==
Lewis wrote there is no incoherence in the notion of personal survival in his book The Self and Immortality (1973). Michael Marsh in a review wrote the book offered a "substantial defense" for interactionist dualism. In his book Persons and Life after Death (1978) Lewis argued that the ultimate basis for a belief in life after death is from religion. He claimed this belief could mean for some, the resurrection of the body, survival in an astral body or survival in a disembodied form. Lewis wrote that disembodied survival is most plausible from a religious point of view.

Lewis was a Christian who sought common ground between the world's religions and argued there is a sense of transcendental reality in all of them. However, he argued against Buddhist and monistic views in which the self is considered to be an illusion.

In his book The Elusive Self (1982) Lewis argued that mental states are "distinct in nature from physical states but constantly interacting with them" and there is a "subject, or a self or soul, which remains constant and is uniquely involved in all the flow of our mental states or experiences." The philosopher Gareth Matthews gave the book a negative review claiming Lewis had offered no evidence for dualism. On the subject of dreamless sleep, Lewis wrote the self ceases to be. According to Matthews the belief that the self can pop in and out of existence would be alarming to some readers but Lewis had no problem with accepting this view. Matthews concluded that Lewis's controversial claims were deliberately left with no direct argumentative support. Eugene T. Long gave the book a positive review stating Lewis had given an adequate defence for the dualistic position and the existence of the self. Long has written that Lewis was a philosophical realist, similar to John Baillie and John Cook Wilson.

== Publications ==
=== Authored books ===
- Morals and the New Theology (1947)
- Morals and Revelation (1951)
- Gwybod am Dduw [Our Knowledge of God] (1952)
- Our Experience of God (1959)
- Freedom and History (1962)
- Philosophy of Religion (1965).
- World Religions: Meeting Points and Major Issues [with Robert Lawson Slater] (1966)
- Dreaming and Experience: delivered on 11 May 1967 at the London School of Economics and Political Science, London (1968)
- The Elusive Mind: Based on the First Series of the Gifford Lectures Delivered in the University of Edinburgh, 1966-68 (1969)
- The Self and Immortality (1973)
- Persons and Life after Death :Essays by Hywel D. Lewis and Some of His Critics (1978)
- Logic, Ontology, and Action (1979)
- Pwy yw Iesu Grist? [Who is Jesus Christ?] (1979)
- Jesus in the Faith of Christians (1981)
- The Elusive Self: Based on The Gifford Lectures Delivered in the University of Edinburgh, 1966-68 (1982)
- Freedom and Alienation: the Third Volume Based on The Gifford Lectures Delivered in the University of Edinburgh 1966-68 (1985)

=== Books edited ===
- Contemporary British Philosophy: Personal Statements 3rd ser. (1956) (2nd ed. 1961)
  - includes "Introduction" and "Worship and Idolatry" by Lewis.
- Clarity is Not Enough (1963)
  - includes "Mind and Body. Some Observations on Mr. Strawson’s Views" by Lewis
- Philosophy East and West, Essays in Honour of Dr. T.M.P. Mahadevan (1976).
- Contemporary British Philosophy, 4th ser. (1976).

For a more complete list of publications see Religion, reason and the self: essays in honour of Hywel D. Lewis (1989).
