= William Blackstone (disambiguation) =

William Blackstone (1723–1780) was an English judge and jurist.

William Blackstone may also refer to:

- William Seymour Blackstone (1809–1881), his grandson, MP for Wallingford
- William Blaxton, sometimes spelled Blackstone (1595–1675), early New England settler
- William E. Blackstone (1841–1935), American evangelist and Christian Zionist
- William Blackstone, the name sometimes attributed to Billy Higgins (vaudeville) (1888–1937), songwriter and vaudeville comedian
- Statue of William Blackstone, located in Washington, D.C.
- William T. Blackstone (1931–1977), American academic and philosopher

== See also ==
- Blackstone (disambiguation)
