= Frank Parker =

Frank Parker may refer to:

- Frank Parker (tennis) (1916–1997), American tennis player
- Frank Parker (singer) (1903–1999), American singer and television personality
- Frank Parker (actor) (1939–2018), American television actor
- Frank Parker (United States Army officer) (1872–1947), American military general
- Frank W. Parker (1860–1932), New Mexico Supreme Court justice
- Frank Parker (American football) (1939–2025), American football defensive lineman
- Frank Parker (sport shooter) (1866–1933), Canadian Olympic shooter, competitor at the 1908 Summer Olympics
- Frank B. Parker, a fictional character in the television series Seven Days
- Frank Parker (footballer) (1920–2017), Australian rules footballer
- Frank R. Parker (1940–1997), American civil rights lawyer and voting rights activist
- Frank Critchley Parker (1862–1944), Australian journalist and newspaper publisher

== See also ==
- Francis Parker (disambiguation)
