= Gregory S. Moss =

American philosophy professor

Education
- Education: University of Georgia (MA, PhD)
- Thesis: The Being of the Concept: A Historical and Systematic Inquiry (2014)
- Doctoral advisor: Richard Dien Winfield

Philosophical work
- Era: Contemporary philosophy
- Region: Western philosophy
- School: German Idealism
- Institutions: The Chinese University of Hong Kong
- Website: www.philosophermoss.org

Gregory Scott Moss is a professor of philosophy at the Chinese University of Hong Kong.

== Biography ==
He completed his MA in 2007 under the direction of Edward Halper and his PhD in philosophy at the University of Georgia in August 2014, under the direction of Richard Dien Winfield with the dissertation: "The Being of the Concept: A Historical and Systematic Inquiry". From 2013 to 2014, he held a Fulbright Research Fellowship in Bonn, Germany.

Moss served as a lecturer in philosophy at Clemson University from 2014 to 2016. He was appointed Assistant Professor of Philosophy at The Chinese University of Hong Kong in the fall of 2016.

In his 2020 book, Hegel's Foundation Free Metaphysics, Moss tries to shed new light on Hegel's Science of Logic, with the help of Graham Priest' concept of dialetheism. The book was the winner of hegelpd–prize in 2022.

== Selected works ==
=== Monographs ===
- Moss, Gregory S. (2020-05-20). Hegel's Foundation Free Metaphysics: The Logic of Singularity (1 ed.). New York and London : Routledge, 2020. | Series: Routledge studies in nineteenth-century philosophy: Routledge. doi:10.4324/9781315185347. ISBN 978-1-315-18534-7.

=== Editorials ===
- Scott, Robert H.; Moss, Gregory S., eds. (2018-07-20). The Significance of Indeterminacy: Perspectives from Asian and Continental Philosophy (1 ed.). 1 [edition]. | New York : Taylor & Francis, 2018. | Series: Routledge. doi:10.4324/9781315145228. ISBN 978-1-315-14522-8.

=== Translations ===
- Gabriel, Markus (2015-07-06). Why the World Does Not Exist. John Wiley & Sons. ISBN 978-0-7456-8758-2.
