= James Felt =

American philosopher (1926–2022)

- Born: January 4, 1926; Dallas, Texas, U.S.
- Died: February 17, 2022 (aged 96); Los Gatos, California, U.S.

Education
- Thesis: Whitehead's Early Theory of Scientific Objects (1965)
- Doctoral advisor: Richard J. Blackwell

Philosophical work
- Era: 21st-century philosophy
- Region: Western philosophy

James Felt (January 4, 1926 – February 17, 2022) was an American philosopher and John Nobili Professor of Philosophy at the University of Santa Clara. He was a former president of the Metaphysical Society of America (2002).
