= Owen Goldin =

American philosopher

- Born: June 7, 1957 (age 69)

Education
- Education: University of Texas at Austin (PhD)
- Thesis: The Role of the Demonstration that Explains an Essence in Aristotle's Theory of Explanation (1987)
- Doctoral advisor: Alexander Phoebus D. Mourelatos, Sarah Broadie

Philosophical work
- Era: 21st-century philosophy
- Region: Western philosophy
- Institutions: Marquette University

Owen Goldin (born June 7, 1957) is an American philosopher and Professor of Philosophy at Marquette University. He is a former president of the Metaphysical Society of America. Goldin is known for his research on Aristotle's Posterior Analytics.

== Books ==
- Explaining an Eclipse: Aristotle's Posterior Analytics 2.1-10 (University of Michigan Press, 1996)
