= Thomas-Institut =

German University

Thomas-Institut, University of Cologne
- Type: Research Institute, in particular in the field of medieval philosophy
- Established: 1950
- Director: Andreas Speer
- Location: Cologne, NRW, Germany
- Website: www.thomasinstitut.uni-koeln.de

The Thomas-Institut is a research Institute whose function is to study medieval philosophy by preparing critical editions as well as historical and systematic studies of medieval authors.

== General information ==
The Thomas-Institut was founded in 1950 by Josef Koch, then Professor for medieval philosophy at the University of Cologne. Forming part of the Faculty of Humanities and, more particularly, the Philosophy Department, the Thomas-Institut is a research Institute whose function it is to serve the study of medieval philosophy by preparing critical editions and historical and systematic studies of medieval authors. The director of the Institute is the professor holding the chair in medieval philosophy at the university.

Since communicating the results of this work is an essential part of the task of the Institute, the staff gives various courses in medieval philosophy at the University of Cologne. Jointly with twenty other departments - from History and Philology to Byzantine, Jewish and Islamic Studies - the Thomas-Institute organizes an extensive programme for medieval studies, the Zentrum für Mittelalterstudien (ZfMs).

Since its beginnings the Thomas-Institut has attached importance to international cooperation and exchange, and many of the projects pursued at the Thomas-Institut are international collaborations. The Mediaevistentagung, taking place every two years, has become one of the foremost conferences on medieval studies in Europe, furthering international and interdisciplinary research. The proceedings are published in the Miscellanea Mediaevalia series, edited by the Institute and published by de Gruyter.

In addition to its own projects the Thomas-Institut sponsors several ongoing editions which are funded and organized by other institutions. The most important at present are the Averroes Latinus project of the International Union of Academies, funded by the Nordrhein-Westfäische Akademie der Wissenschaften, and the critical edition of the works of Nicolaus Cusanus with the Heidelberger Akademie der Wissenschaften. The Thomas-Institut likewise participates in the Aristoteles Latinus project organized by the International Union of Academies, it hosts the Meister Eckhart Archiv and has recently started the critical edition of Durandus of St. Pourçain.

Since its beginnings the Thomas-Institut has edited the Studien und Texte zur Geistesgeschichte des Mittelalters (STGMA) published by Brill, one of the most renowned series in medieval philosophy and medieval studies. In 1997, together with the De Wulf-Mansion Centre in Leuven, the Thomas-Institut took over the journal Recherches de Théologie et Philosophie médiévales. For further information about the publications of the Thomas-Institut, see

== Research ==
=== Main areas of expertise ===
- Conditions of Scientific Discourse in Medieval Arabic, Hebrew, Byzantine and Latin Culture

Scientific discourse in the Middle Ages has its common ground in the reception of Greek learning from late Antiquity. It is diversified, however, according to the sociological and institutional as well as religious and theological framework in which Greek science is integrated. Besides that, the processes of rationalisation taking place in various fields of knowledge exercise a considerable influence. Key-words like "Reception of Dionysius", "Reception of Aristotle", and "Averroism" refer us to a complex structure of medieval bodies of knowledge. This structure has to be understood as the result of far-reaching processes of reception and transformation, transmission and translation. Inquiries in this area demand a combination of philosophical, philological, and historiographical competences. Research at the Thomas-Institut focuses on the contexts of transmission, on the attempts to define the meaning of "philosophy" (for example in the relationship of "Philosophy and Wisdom"), and on the formation of epistemological and institutional canons.

- Intellect, Mind and Soul: Concepts, Stratifications and Boundaries. A Critical Evaluation of the Medieval Debates

The debate on intellect, mind and soul is currently one of those philosophical topics generating the most innovative questions. Medieval philosophy is of central importance in this respect, since it furnishes a rich tradition of investigation in this area. The problem was dealt with in all the medieval philosophical and theological cultures and languages. While differences abounded in every milieu, some solutions were adopted across boundaries. The medieval contribution is interesting from the point of view of the history of ideas, but the reception of traditions from Antiquity also engendered new theories. The confrontation of these theories in epistemological debates from the 13th century to the Renaissance lead to the development of new models. One may think for instance of "augustinisme avicennisant", the Averroistic theory of intellect, and the combination of Aristotelian and pseudo-Dionysian noetics. When one examines the modern debate on the background just sketched, it becomes clear that medieval philosophy provides models and perspectives both richer in arguments and truly interdisciplinary. This topic has already been made the object of research by an international network of institutions working on medieval philosophy (the EGSAMP members Leuven, Amsterdam, Pisa, Lecce, Bari, Sofia) in which the Thomas-Institut participates.

=== Ongoing research projects ===
- The Relationship between Philosophy and Wisdom
  - Philosophy and Wisdom in the Middle Ages

A Contribution to the Development of the Western Concept of Philosophy Behind the terminological opposition of philosophy and wisdom, into whose reasons this project enquires, emerges another problem: the origin of philosophy. Thus the medieval debate is representative of a basic discourse, which always anew attempts to determine the essence of philosophy. The Middle Ages, and especially the 13th century are of prime importance for the reconstruction of the affaire de cœur of philosophy and wisdom. In the second half of this century the reception of an Aristotelian idea of philosophical wisdom sparks a major controversy about the identity of philosophy, a controversy that presages many of the questions asked in the modern era. The results which have been reached in a number of case-studies will be assembled and assessed in context.

  - "Rhizomatics": the Art of Living and Wisdom as Bridges for a Transcultural Philosophy

In this project "rhizomatics" and nomadism as developed by the French philosophers Gilles Deleuze and Félix Guattari are employed to address transcultural issues. At the heart of this project are the concept of philosophy, its relation to wisdom, methodology and ethics and possible forms and constructions of philosophy. Besides the French and German Literature on Deleuze the project will take into account the reception and resonance of his ideas in Spanish-American thought.

  - New Perspectives in the Historiography of Medieval Philosophy

What is medieval philosophy? This question has been answered in a variety of ways even before Gilson's influential attempts to give a definitive reply. Such answers are always bound up with a certain idea of philosophy and its resulting mechanisms of inclusion and exclusion. But if one takes into account the dynamics proper to different cultural frameworks which transferred the philosophical inheritance from late Antiquity into modernity, one must try to describe its interactions more closely, disregarding the classical narratives of medieval philosophy. In order to realise this, new methodological approaches will be attempted. This project forms part of the InterLink-project (Bari-Köln-Sofia-Leuven-Paris) "Soggetto e statuto della filosofia nel Medioevo. Nuove prospettive di ricerca nell'edizione critica dei testi e nelle metodologie di indagine storiografica".

- Thomas Aquinas in Philosophical Context
  - Thomas Aquinas, In librum Beati Dionysii De divinis nominibus expositione, Book IV, Lectiones 1-10

Thomas Aquinas's commentary on Dionysius is an exemplary case for the study of the encounter of the Latin and the Byzantine Middle Ages. Of special interest are Thomas's first ten "Lectiones" on the fourth book of his model. Here, central themes of Neoplatonism are treated: the Good, light, beauty, and love. A translation and commentary on the basis of a revised Latin text is in preparation.

  - Edith Stein's Translations of Aquinas's Works De veritate and De ente et essentia

Edith Stein's translations of Aquinas are not only an important document for the intellectual development of Husserl's former assistant but also show in an exemplary case the encounter of Neoscholasticism and modern philosophy at the beginning of the 20th century. In the framework of the new edition of the works of Edith Stein her translation of the Quaestiones disputatae de veritate and her yet unpublished translation of De ente et essential will be edited alongside a number of further "Thomistica" (ESGA 24).

  - Thomas Aquinas, Quaestio disputata "De libero arbitrio" (De malo VI)

This text is a key to understanding Aquinas's teaching on free choice as foundation of truly human, that is to say responsible and autonomous action. A German translation of this text on the basis of the Editio Leonina is currently in preparation and will be published, together with an extensive introduction, by Reclam.

- The Medieval Theory of Transcendentals

The project is dedicated to the historical development of the theory of transcendentals from its formation in the thirteenth century (Philip the Chancellor) up to its treatment in the Disputationes metaphysicae by Francesco Suárez. It likewise deals with the significance of the theory of transcendentals for medieval philosophy in general.

- The "Super"-Transcendental and the Splitting of Metaphysics

In search of the origins and motives of the splitting of metaphysics in the 17th and 18th century into a metaphysica generalis and metaphysica specialis, conceived for the first time by Francis of Marchia at the beginning of the 14th century, this project enquires into the relationship between the first object of the human intellect and the proper object of metaphysics as they present themselves in conceptions of metaphysics after the time of Duns Scotus. Especially the attempt to define the primum obiectum intellectus as "super-transcendental" has a constitutive function for the legitimating of a twofold metaphysics.

- Radicalisation in lieu of Abolition of the Science of Being. On the Development of First Philosophy from the Late Middle Ages to the 18th Century

According to the account of the development of first philosophy predominant today, this discipline underwent a transformation since the late Middle Ages, in the course of which the Aristotelian theory of being was dissolved and reformed as an onto-logic of that which can be thought, thus immediately preparing Kant's transcendental philosophy. This interpretation needs to be revised in order to show that the said transformation did not exceed the boundaries of the traditional concept of science. On the contrary, in the teachings of the main representatives of the discipline up to Wolff and Baumgarten one finds a new concept of the theory of being as a theory of the universal and necessary structure of reality which is common to God and every possible world. Thus we do not encounter abolition but rather a radicalisation of tendencies which have shaped the development of first philosophy since the medieval reception of Aristotle and his Arabic interpreters. These tendencies are: the turn from a theological to an ontological concept of first philosophy, from its conception as practical wisdom to the idea of a universal theoretical science, from transcendent being as the starting point of thought to the transcategorical and thus transcendental content of being as such.

- Master Eckhart: Historical and Systematical Perspectives

As part of the research on the medieval theory of transcendentia, this project examines the peculiar form which the theory of transcendentals takes in Meister Eckhart. The project attempts at the same time to reconstruct Eckhart's Opus propositionum, especially the 9th tractate: "De natura superioris, et inferioris eius oppositi".

- A Mystical Treatise between Convention and Provocation - Possibilities and Limits of Expression in the "Theologia deutsch" ("The Francfurt")

The treatise written in the 14th century which became popular in the 16th under the title Theologia deutsch, has been considered in scholarship mainly from two perspectives: on the one hand as a key text of the Reformation - it was first edited by Martin Luther - on the other hand as a document of timeless Christian spirituality that can inspire and direct even the life of modern readers. Both approaches have invested the Theologia deutsch with an aura which obfuscates its specific theologico-philosophical profile. Originally it was an anonymous treatise from the context of the so-called "German Mysticism" of the 14th century, transmitted in only a few manuscripts. This is where the planned investigation begins: Disregarding its reception during the Reformation, the Theologia deutsch is examined it its original formative context and thus as a mystical treatise of a special type, which does not at all transmit a timeless spirituality but rather - like other Latin and colloquial texts - sounds out possibilities of expression. The study centres on the Christology and the doctrine of God of the Theologia deutsch. Besides that it discusses - since according to the prologue the author was an anonymous Knight of the German Order from Francfurt - the problems of authorship, authority, and authenticity.

- William of Auxerre, Summa de officiis ecclesiasticis, *First Critical Edition in Digital Format

In the beginnings of the University of Paris around the year 1200 the Magister William of Auxerre wrote his explanation of liturgy which attempts to elucidate all the cultic-ritual actions and objects of Christian liturgy and to suggest their hidden meaning. The edition of the yet unpublished Summa de officiis ecclesiasticis makes use of the possibilities of digital data processing and further develops in this medium the methodological standards and formats of presentation established for printed editions. The edition is accompanied by a study on the concept of time which forms the basis of William's interpretation of the liturgy and according to which several levels of time and meaning become intertwined during the ritual.

- Ibn Bâjja's Kitâb al-nafs: The First Western Commentary on the De anima

Ibn Bâjja (ob. 1139), known to the Latin scholastics as "Avempace", was - as the predecessor of Averroes - the first Spanish-Arabic philosopher to comment in a systematical manner upon the writings of Aristotle. Thus he prepared the work of "the Commentator" with respect to both method and content. This is true especially in the field of psychology and the doctrine of intellect where Ibn Bâjja, as a follower of Alexander of Aphrodisias and Alfarabi, formed an Aristotelian counterbalance to the psychology of Avicenna, which was more strongly influenced by Neoplatonism and by the medical tradition. With the preparation of the critical edition and German translation of the Kitâb al-nafs Ibn Bâjja's most central writing on psychology shall be rendered accessible in a reliable form supplemented with guides to its sources. The edition will be accompanied by a study which - for the first time - examines in detail the philosophical questions and solutions of this early period of the reception of De anima. It enquires into the conceptual and historical background of problems like the concept of intention (ma'nâ) or the so-called "conjunction with the Active Intellect" - ideas which came to exercise a longstanding and varied influence.

- "The Birth of a World". Investigations into Themes in the Thought of Michel Foucault

Starting from an analysis of the opposition of truth and fiction dictated by the traditional idea of philosophy and science, and an examination of the concomitant confrontation of philosophy and science on the one hand and literature on the other hand this study investigates the peculiar status which Michel Foucault gives to the concept of knowledge. This concept of knowledge corresponds in Foucault's writings to a specific concept of fiction in a way that has yet to be clearly defined. To this end Foucault's early texts (apparently dismissed by him later), the long Binswanger-introduction (1954), and the Archéologie du savoir are all searched for a motif which can be called - employing an expression by Foucault himself - the "Birth of a World". The investigation into this theme renders visible elements of "structure" and "history". In the course of this reading the evolution of the foundational thought-structures leading to Foucault's specific concept of knowledge will be examined.

=== Edition projects ===
- The Commentary on the Sentences by Durandus of St. Pourçain (a S. Porciano)

As J. Koch has shown, the commentary on the Sentences by Durandus of St. Pourçain (1275–1334) is preserved in three recensions. While the last redaction was printed in the 16th century, the first two versions remain unpublished. Of particular interest is the first, because it contains the sharpest polemic against Thomas Aquinas and because it engendered the most critical response by his contemporaries (such as Petrus de Palude and Petrus Aureoli). In the first place a computerised copy of the third version will be made, which can serve as an effective research instrument. The project centres, nevertheless, on the critical edition of the first version which will be made on the basis of a complete collation of all manuscripts.

- Critical Edition of the Commentaries on Book V and VI of the Nicomachean Ethics in the Latin Translation by Robert Grosseteste

The project consists in the study of the Latin reception of the commentaries on Aristotle's Nicomachean Ethics composed and assembled in twelfth century Constantinople at the initiative of Princess Anna Comnena. The critical edition of the texts of the commentaries on book V (Anonymous and Michael of Ephesus) and book VI (Eustratius of Nicaea) will complete Mercken's edition of the commentaries on books I-IV (CLCAG 6.1) and VII-X (CLCAG 6.3). The edition of the text will be introduced by a study of the sources of the Greek original text and its Latin reception in the thirteenth and fourteenth century.

- Averroes: Collected Works

The Latin translation of three of the most important works of Averroes, the Long Commentaries on De caelo, Physica, and Metaphysica, will be edited and published in the series "Bibliotheca" affiliated with the Recherches de Théologie et Philosophie médiévales. This "editio minor" is based on the early printings and some few manuscripts. It is further intended to make these commentaries eventually available on CD-Rom. The edition of the Long Commentary on De caelo on the basis of F. Carmody's edition, revised by R. Arnzen, has already been published. At the moment the edition of the Long Commentary on the Metaphysica (by Dag N. Hasse, Würzburg) and of the Long Commentary on the Physica are in preparation.

=== Collaborations ===
- Historical-Critical Edition of the Arabic-Latin Translations of Averroes's (Ibn Rushd's) Commentaries on Aristotle

This project forms part of the edition of the Opera omnia, supervised by the International Union of Academies (Director: Gerhard Endress; responsible for the Averroes Latinus: Andreas Speer). It is funded by the Nordrhein-Westfälische Akademie der Wissenschaften.

  - Middle Commentary on the Categoriae

This Middle Commentary on the Categoriae forms part of the group of Middle Commentaries which Averroes devoted to the Organon and whose Latin translation is attributed to William of Luna. Prepared by a large number of publications, the work currently in progress continues the edition of the Middle Commentary on Peri Hermeneias which has already been published. At the moment the text is prepared for printing, the apparatus and the Latin-Arabic glossary are being adapted to the definite text. At the same time some parts of the introduction are developed further; for example, the question whether there were any double translations is examined, as is the Hebrew-Latin translation from the Renaissance. Did its author, Jacob Mantino, make use of the medieval Arabic-Latin translation or its editio princeps?

  - Long Commentary on the Physica

Averroes completed his Long Commentary on the Physics around the year 1186. Like a number of other works by Averroes, it was translated from Arabic to Latin at the beginning of the 13th century, most probably by Michael Scot. More than sixty medieval manuscripts, complete and fragmentary, preserve the versio vulgata of the text. The detailed documentation of its textual history evolves continually. With the exception of a few manuscripts the dependences and interrelations in the manuscript tradition have been established on the basis of a comparison of approximately 1100 positions. The results concerning the filiation of the manuscripts can thus be established.

  - Long Commentary on the Physica, Book VII, according to Ms. Vienna, Austrian National Library, Lat. 2334

In the manuscript of the Austrian National Library, Vienna lat. 2334, the seventh and part of the eight book of the Long Commentary are preserved in a translation which differs considerably from the one by Michel Scot, both in vocabulary and in syntax. This text will be edited separately. In order to prove that the translator was not Michel Scot, but probably Hermannus Alemannus, this edition will be accompanied by a detailed comparison of technical terms and of important portions of the text. The study has been approved by the Nordrhein-Westfälische Akademie and will be published by F. Schöningh, Paderborn (ISBN 978-3-506-76316-7)

  - Arabic Concepts of Metaphysics, Considering in particular Averroes's Epitome on Aristotle's Metaphysics

The project comprises two parts: First, a historical-critical edition of the Arabic text of Averroes's Epitome on the Metaphysics which is based on all available Arabic manuscripts and which takes into account the Hebrew translation from the 13th century, as well as the Latin translation from the 16th based on the latter. The edition will be introduced by a philological study and accompanied by an English translation, in order to render the text available for a larger group of scholars in medieval philosophy. The second part consists in a historical and philosophical analysis of Arabic concepts of metaphysics, its foundations, objects, parts, and methods. Averroes's concept of metaphysics will be investigated in the historical and philosophical context of competing ideas. Of special interest is the question whether in the post-Avicennian tradition metaphysics was conceived as ontology and/or universal science in contradistinction from theology.

  - Averroes-Database

The bibliography of secondary literature on Averroes published since 1980 contains at present 1043 titles. It is constantly updated and accessible via internet. The bibliography of Averroes's works provides information on the relevant manuscripts, editions, and translations. It is still in preparation, but the sections on Logic, Philosophy of Nature, Psychology and the Doctrine of Intellect are already [online http://www.thomasinst.uni-koeln.de/averroes].

- Historical-Critical Edition of the Opera omnia of Nicolaus Cusanus
1. Reformatio generalis (Bd. XV, Fasc. 2), ed. Hans Gerhard Senger, in press
2. De usu communionis; Epistolae ad Bohemos; Intentio (Bd. XV, Fasz. 1), edd. Stefan Nottelmann, Hans Gerhard Senger, in press
3. Sermones CXCIII-CCIII (Bd. XVIII, Fasc. 5), edd. Silvia Donati, Isabelle Mandrella, Hamburg 2005
4. Sermones CCLVIII-CCLXVII (Bd. XIX, Fasc. 5), edd. Heide D. Riemann, Harald Schwaetzer, Franz-Bernhard Stammkötter, Hamburg 2005
5. Sermones CCLXVIII-CCLXXXII (Bd. XIX, Fasc. 6), ed. Heide D. Riemann, Hamburg 2005
6. Sermones CCLXXXIII-CCXCIII (Bd. XIX, Fasc. 7), edd. Silvia Donati, Heide D. Riemann, Hamburg 2005
- Historical-Critical Edition of Aristotle's Meteorology in the Latin Translation by William of Moerbeke

This project is part of the Aristoteles Latinus, edited by the International Union of Academies and directed by Carlos Steel. The Latin text of the Meteorology has already been published on the CD-ROM version of the Aristoteles Latinus (Édition CD-ROM des traductions gréco-latines d'Aristote) in 2003.

- Historical-Critical Edition of Book I and II of the Commentary on the Physics by Aegidius Romanus

The Augustinian monk Aegidius Romanus (ca. 1243/7-1316) was a prominent figure at the University of Paris in the late 13th century. His philosophical works consist mainly in commentaries on Aristotle. In the late 13th and during the 14th century Aegidius's commentaries were well known; their impact can be compared with the paraphrases by Albert the Great and the commentaries by Thomas Aquinas. This project centres on the edition of book I and II of his commentary on the Physics (ca. 1274/75). They are devoted to some central issues in Aristotle's philosophy of nature, namely the problems of the principles of change, the concept of nature, and the concepts of necessity and chance. Aegidius's commentary is extant in thirty manuscripts. The manuscript tradition is complex because it is partly a University tradition, dependent on one exemplar from the university milieu, and partly independent. The text of books I and II has been established on the basis of eight manuscripts, and the sources have been traced. At present the historical and philological introduction is in preparation. The edition will be part of Aegidii Romani Opera omnia, edited by the Unione Accademica Nazionale, directed by Francesco Del Punta.

== History ==
The foundation of the Thomas-Institut on October 10, 1950, grew out of efforts to reinstall a centre for the study of medieval philosophy in Germany after World War II, one that would be able to inspire research into a philosophical tradition representing positive ideas and humanistic values. It was hoped that the discussion of the problems of our time would benefit from the results of such studies. Nevertheless, the Thomas-Institut was not conceived as part of the movement of Neo-Scholasticism, but rather as an institution which would conduct research in medieval philosophy much in the same way that elsewhere research in ancient and modern philosophy was done - never as a narrowly historical enterprise, but always in touch with contemporary questions and perspectives.

Josef Koch (1885–1967), then one of the rare German scholars internationally renowned in the field of medieval philosophy, had been chosen in 1948 to become a professor at the University of Cologne with a view to the Institute's founding. In close connection with the founding of the Institute stood the creation of the Mediaevistentagung, and the series Studien und Texte zur Geistesgeschichte des Mittelalters, both of which were devised by Koch and are still carried on today.

The development of the Institute was boosted by a grant from the American High Commissioner for Germany, arranged by Professor John O. Riedl of the Educational and Cultural Relation Division, and later of Marquette University in Milwaukee - a personal friend of founder Josef Koch. The Institute was able to move into three rooms in Universitätsstraße 22, where later it was allowed to expand considerably, and where it is still housed today. Since 1952 the Thomas-Institut has been maintained by the University of Cologne and has become an integral part of the Philosophy Department.

The first tasks of the newly created Institute consisted in building up a research library and in procuring the necessary microfilm copies of medieval manuscripts in order to render critical editions possible. The collection concentrated at first on Meister Eckhart and Nicolaus Cusanus, who were then studied by Koch and editions of whose works were prepared at the Institute in continuation of projects begun before the war. The fund of manuscript copies grew steadily and was enriched by every new project. The library was designed to include not only primary texts from the Middle Ages and bibliographical material but a historical section spanning from Antiquity to contemporary philosophy that permits the systematic studies intended by the aims described in 1950.

In 1954 Koch was succeeded in the director's office by Paul Wilpert (1906–1967), an expert in Aristotle and Thomas Aquinas and already affiliated with the Cusanus edition since the 1940s. It was Wilpert who created the Miscellanea Mediaevalia series in 1962, thus providing an organ for the publications of the Institute, first and foremost the proceedings of the Mediaevistentagungen. In 1961 Wilpert organized in Cologne the 2nd International Congress of Medieval Philosophy of the Société Internationale pour l'Étude de la Philosophie Médiévale (S.I.E.P.M), whose vice chairman he had become in the founding year of the organization, 1958. With the activities of Wilpert's collaborator, Gudrun Vuillemin-Diem, the Thomas-Institut took part in the Aristoteles Latinus project of the International Union of Academies. Ms. Vuillemin-Diem has continued working with the Thomas-Institut under its subsequent directors, and has published to date the four medieval recensions of the Metaphysics.

After Wilpert's sudden death, Albert Zimmermann (1928–2017), a pupil of Josef Koch's, became the third director of the Thomas-Institut. His fields of research are especially the Aristotelian philosophy of nature in the Middle Ages and Latin Averroism. When the International Union of Academies took over the Averrois Opera project from the Medieval Academy of America, Zimmermann became its general editor in 1974 (until 1996) and the Thomas-Institut took the responsibility for the edition of the Latin translations of Averroes's commentaries. The project currently employs two editors, Roland Hissette and Horst Schmieja, and is funded by the Nordrhein-Westfälische Akademie der Wissenschaften. In 1992 Zimmermann was elected president of the S.I.E.P.M.

Zimmermann retired in 1993 and was followed in office in 1994 by Jan Adrianus Aertsen, formerly a professor at the Vrije Universiteit Amsterdam (since 1984). His main area of research is the history of the Doctrine of Transcendentals. In 1997 Aertsen was elected vice chairman of the S.I.E.P.M. The 4th Symposium Averroicum, combined with the sixth conference of the editors of Averroes's works, was held in Cologne in 1996 in collaboration with Gerhard Endreß (Bochum). In 1997 the Thomas-Institut under the lead of Jan A. Aertsen and Andreas Speer organized the 10th International Congress of Medieval Philosophy in Erfurt. Following a suggestion by Jan A. Aertsen and a conference in Cologne co-organized by the Thomas-Institut, a Gesellschaft für Philosophie des Mittelalters und der Renaissance (GPMR) was set up in 2003, for which the Thomas-Institut currently provides the office.

The present director of the Thomas-Institut, Andreas Speer, formerly professor at Würzburg (2000), was appointed in 2004.

== Activities ==
=== Mediaevistentagung ===
Already on October 11, 1950, one day after the foundation of the Thomas-Institut, the first Mediaevistentagung took place. Josef Koch had invited scholars from Germany and from the Institut supérieur de philosophie of Louvain with the declared aim to assemble - not for a "congress" but in "friendly discussion" - all those interested in medieval studies: philosophers, theologians, historians, philologists, art- and music-historians. This interdisciplinary approach has since determined the programmes of the Mediaevistentagungen, which until 1960 were held every year. Since 1960 the Thomas-Institut organizes those conferences every two years in the second week of September. Beginning with the second conference in 1951, which was devoted to medieval symbolism, every Mediaevistentagung has been centred on a global topic that stood in relation with the work done at the Institute or with current interests in the field of medieval studies. Since 1952, the results have been documented; the first proceedings were published in the series Studien und Texte zur Geistesgeschichte des Mittelalters (vols. 3 and 5), since 1956 they are published in the Miscellanea Mediaevalia series created especially for that purpose. While remaining true to its original concept, the Mediaevistentagung has become more fully international, bigger - the record was set with circa 300 participants in 1994 - and, not to mention, longer - it now lasts a week. In 2004 a workshop was introduced to precede the main conference. It provides a forum for younger scholars to present their works in progress or, alternatively, presents an opportunity to share different approaches and projects in open discussion.

=== Forschungskolloquium ===
The "Forschungskolloquium" is a series of loosely connected lectures by our collaborators, guests, or invitees. It affords an opportunity to present a particular field of research to the colleagues and at the same time to the wider public.

=== Köln-Bonner Philosophisches Kolloquium ===
The "Köln-Bonner Philosophisches Kolloquium", organized together with the Philosophy Department of Bonn University, is a semester long reading course for graduate and older undergraduate students (taking place every two weeks). The course examines a systematic topic (e.g. Aristotelian psychology, concepts of metaphysics) throughout ancient and medieval philosophy.
