= William Desmond (philosopher) =

Irish philosopher (born 1951)

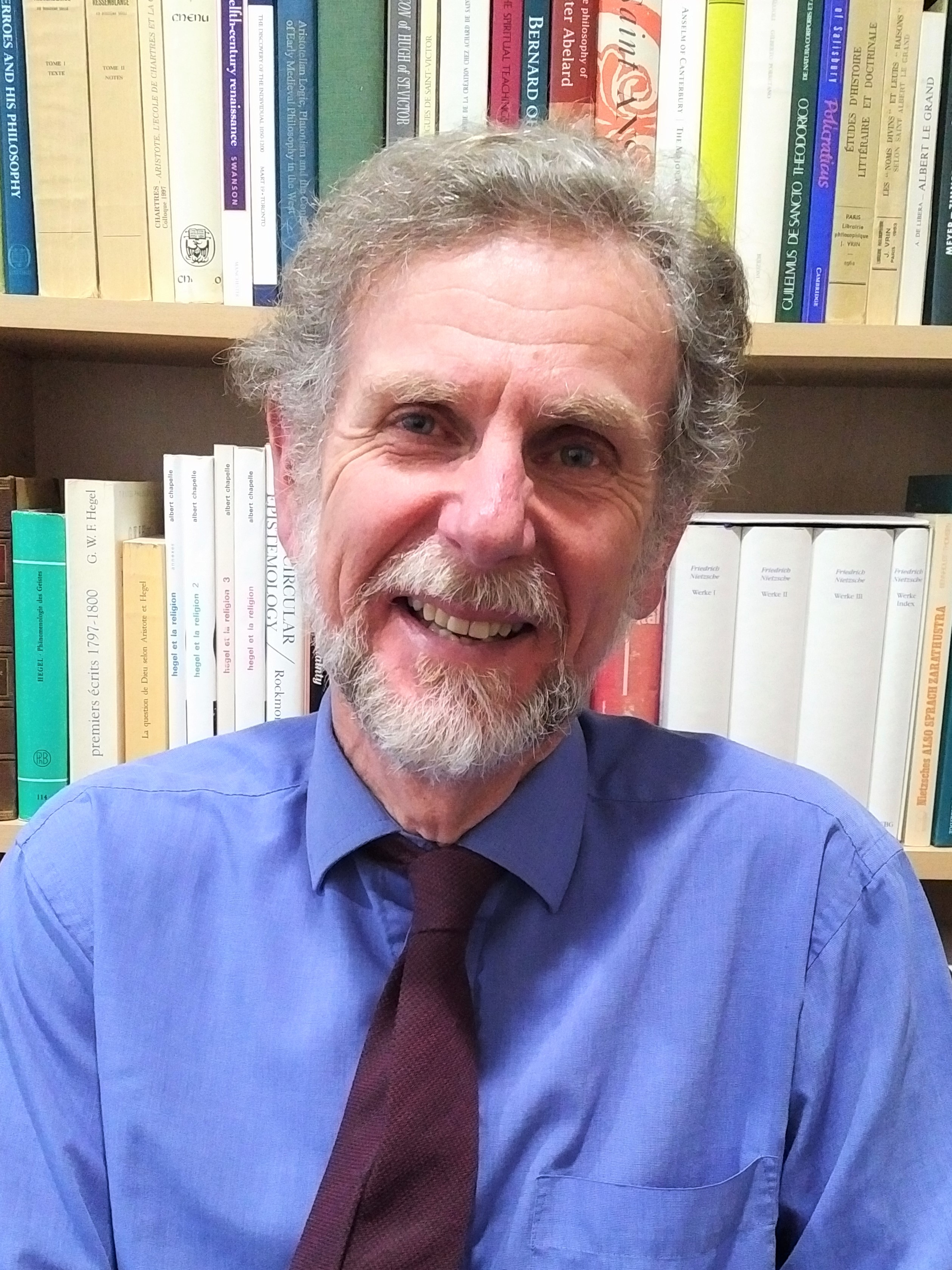
- Born: William James Desmond; 1951 (age 74–75); Cork, Ireland
- Awards: Cardinal Mercier Prize (1995); J.N. Findlay Award of the Metaphysical Society of America (1997, 2019)

Education
- Education: Pennsylvania State University (PhD)
- Thesis: The World as Image and Original (1978)
- Doctoral advisor: Carl G. Vaught
- Other advisors: Rio Preisner, Donald Phillip Verene

Philosophical work
- Era: Contemporary philosophy
- Region: Western philosophy
- School: Continental philosophy; Revival of German idealism
- Institutions: Katholieke Universiteit Leuven; Villanova University
- Main interests: Metaphysics; philosophy of art; ethics; religion; history of philosophy
- Notable ideas: Metaxology; intimate strangeness of Being; intimate universal; ethos

William James Desmond (born January 7, 1951) is an Irish philosopher who has written on ontology, metaphysics, ethics, and religion. Desmond earned his B.A. and M.A. from University College, Cork in 1972 and 1974 and his Ph.D. from Pennsylvania State University in 1978.

A former president of the Hegel Society of America (1990–1992) and the Metaphysical Society of America (1995), Desmond is professor of philosophy at the Higher Institute of Philosophy at the Katholieke Universiteit Leuven in Belgium, and also at Villanova University in Pennsylvania. He is a past president of the American Catholic Philosophical Association. In his trilogy, Being and The Between, Ethics and The Between, and God and The Between, Desmond works out an entirely new and complete metaphysical/ontological philosophical system based on what he calls the potencies of being and the senses of being. His most original contribution in his metaphysics is the notion of the "metaxological". Desmond's program consists mainly of exploring the senses in which he claims that modernity has devalued being and what "to be" and "the good" might mean.

== Philosophical work ==
=== The ethos ===
The ethos can be defined as the ontological matrix of value at any given time. For Desmond, the human self always lives in what he calls the ethos. The ethos is where we bring morality and concrete good through our power of affirming. Simultaneously, we receive the hospitality of the ethos through what Desmond calls the "agapeic origin of the good". The origin is the "original givenness that frees beings into their freedom" and must be understood as an agapeic gift which is overdetermined and thus cannot be aptly described or determined univocally or dialectically.

=== The potencies of being ===
Within the ethos there are seven potencies of being. This "enabling repertoire of self becoming" has the "character of an endowment", and is thus seen as a gift. The potencies are not a program to follow; they simply are all together the powers from which ethical selvings, expressed through particular senses of being, take their endowment. The seven potencies are:

1. The Idiotic: By definition, something which cannot be defined specifically. Related closely to the aesthetic, the idiotic potency is always with us as we dwell in the ethos. It is the potency of being present before all dianoetic reduction or understanding. As incarnate beings (thus related to the aesthetic potency), the idiotic concerns our pre-determined being. It is the original intimation of the good of the "to be". Dwelling in the ethos, we generally expect being to be good. This is seen in the immediate expectation of newborns to be healthy; when we see an unhealthy baby, we are shocked and sad. Our original expectation of being is goodness.
2. The Aesthetic: Our being in the world is always incarnate. We live through our bodies and basic to our being is our embodied relationship with the world. The aesthetic is the idiotic incarnate. In beauty and the sublime, we get physical intimations of the good of the to be. The aesthetic potency refers to much more than the "Kantian" purified realm of the aesthetic. The aesthetic potency deals with our embodied sensual communication and interaction with the world. In the experience of the sublime, for instance (again, not taken in the Kantian sense) we get an intimation of the overdetermination of the origin. The exceeding power and force of being is intimated aesthetically to us through the sublime; our reaction is a sensual one through which we come to know the overdetermined power of the "to be". Our relationship with the ethos is always communicative.
3. The Dianoetic: The rational potency of lawmaking and determination. The dianoetic potency looks at the world through laws and determinate formulas. Within the equivocity of the ethos and the interplay of sameness and difference, there emerge some subtle constancies which we can determine through the dianoetic potency. There are some regularities which prove helpful to live in the ethos, and these are determined by this potency. The dianoetic are constancies always already at work in forms of being together.
4. The Transcendental: The potency of a binding universality or condition of possibility. Some constancies in the ethos are so prevalent so as to be called transcendental. The transcendental potency is that which empowers us within the ethos to look for the more general and unconditional condition of possibility. Taken in a Platonic sense, as opposed to Kantian, this condition of possibility is something more akin to the original "good" that always qualifies the ethos. We come to the realisation of the 'agapeic origin' thanks to the transcendental potency. Itself not free of equivocities, the search for the unconditioned condition of possibility must include evil and death in whatever condition of possibility it finds. The origin that gives the 'to be' is thus itself not free of equivocities. To see the transcendental we must die. The transcendental is not a metaphysical qualification but rather ontological as referring to the Good itself. The origin as the agapeic good that gives all being has an ontological determination as Good. There are two transcendental relationships: 1) that between the origin and the ethos: having the characteristic of agapeic; and 2) that between the self and other: having the characteristic of being metaxological.
5. The Eudaimonistic: The sense of wholeness of how we are in the world. This potency, calling up the 'daimon' as the between is the potency of the possibility for a more general wholeness that calls up the idiotic and aesthetic as well as the dianoetic and transcendental. Seen metaxologically, eudaimonic wholeness in this sense might be made concrete by either the "erotic sovereign" (Nietzsche) or the "agapeic servant" (Jesus). Desmond finds it problematic whether the erotic sovereign can be regarded as being truly whole, given that it doesn't fully consider the otherness of the ethos, which is overdetermined. The erotic sovereign is in the end transcendence without transcendence, because it only transcends again into itself, even if as a higher form, and there is never another involved. The eudaimonistic, calling up Aristotle's original conception of a man of phronesis as happy, is the potency that can take both the dianoetic and transcendental as constancies and law, and apply them to specific instances within the chiaroscuro involved in the idiotic and aesthetic. This being in between of the daimon correlates to a higher sense of wholeness being both involved in and transcending the ethos.
6. The Transcending: This is the potency of the "between" itself; the mystery of self-surpassing and the excess of the overdetermined milieu itself. The transcending potency can only be seen metaxologically because it is itself a move towards the open overdeterminate, which is only seen thus. A movement towards the agapeic cannot be done dialectically or univocally because both narrow and define, nor equivocally since transcending requires movement in the between, not mere equivocity.
7. The Transcendent: The ultimate power that itself allows for the possibility of all transcending. "For this we have the extraordinary word God." The Good itself, the power behind everything, is what is always intimated in the between. It allows for self-development and transcending to the Good.

=== The senses of being ===
Within the ontological matrix of being, the different potencies can be expressed differently through the senses of being. These ways in which to express the potencies help explore the relations of sameness and difference within the ethos. The four potencies are:

1. Univocal: This potency is that of intelligibility and identity. It is a potency most clearly seen as the driving force behind modernity. The univocal potency helps manifest intelligibility and gives determination to the ethos.
2. Equivocal: The equivocal potency is marked by its indefiniteness and difference.
3. Dialectic: Characterized by mediation, the dialectic sense places emphasis on self-mediated wholeness.
4. The Metaxological: From the Greek 'metaxu' meaning 'between', the metaxological is a view of the ethos from the between as overdetermined. Emphasizing mediation, it leaves the between open (as opposed to the dialectical) and emphasizes the interplay between sameness and difference. The metaxological considers the between as overdetermined and does not attempt to constrict or define the between or the ethos as whole or progressing teleologically. It is a more robust consideration of the agapeic origin as overdetermined good.

== Critique of other philosophers ==
Different philosophers can be seen as embodying different potencies and senses of being throughout the history of philosophy. Kant, for instance, is best defined as a transcendental univocalist. Nietzsche would come close to something like an aesthete given his acknowledgment of the aesthetic/sensual part of being; he is, however, described by Desmond as being defined by the transcending potency and being both equivocal and a dialectician. Hegel might be defined as a dialectician. Desmond believes, however, that all of these philosophers are somehow haunted by those potencies which they seek to ignore or devalue. There is a dialectic in Kant and there are equivocities in Nietzsche. "Metaxological vigilance" shows a clearer picture of the ethos than do any views that restrict philosophical considerations to the other senses of being and potencies.

== Bibliography ==
- Art and the Absolute: A Study of Hegel’s Aesthetics, SUNY Press, 1986.
- Desire, Dialectic and Otherness: An Essay on Origins, Yale University Press, 1987; 2nd edition, Wipf and Stock, 2013.
- Hegel and his Critics: Philosophy in the Aftermath of Hegel, (Editor) SUNY Press, 1989.
- Philosophy and its Others: Ways of Being and Mind, SUNY Press, 1990; A Filosofia e seus Outros: Modos do Ser e do Pensar, trans., José Carlos Aquiar de Souza, Edicoes Loyola: Sao Paula, Brasil, 2000.
- Beyond Hegel and Dialectic: Speculation, Cult and Comedy, SUNY Press, 1992.
- Being and the Between, SUNY Press, 1995. (Winner of the Cardinal Mercier Prize, 1995; also winner of the J.N. Findlay Award of the Metaphysical Society of America, 1997.)
- Perplexity and Ultimacy: Metaphysical Thoughts from the Middle, SUNY Press, 1995.
- Het tragische en het komische, Boom: Amsterdam, 1998 (translation of essays from Beyond Hegel and Dialectic and Perplexity and Ultimacy)
- Translation and introduction to L. Heyde, The Weight of Finitude: Concerning the Philosophical Question of God, SUNY Press, 1999.
- Being and Dialectic, edited with Joseph Grange, SUNY Press, 2000.
- Ethics and the Between, SUNY Press, 2001.
- Beyond Conflict and Reduction: The Interplay of Philosophy, Science and Religion, ed. W. Desmond, Louvain University Press, 2001.
- Art, Origins, Otherness: Between Art and Philosophy, SUNY Press, 2003.
- Hegel's God: A Counterfeit Double?. Routledge. 2003. doi:10.4324/9781315253466. ISBN 978-1-315-25346-6.
- Philosophy and Religion in German Idealism, edited with Paul Cruysberghs and Ernst Otto-Onnasch, Kluwer Publishing, 2004.
- Godsdienst/Filosofisch bekeken, edited with Ignace Verhack and Paul Cortois, Pelckmans Uitgeverij, Belgium, 2003.
- Is There a Sabbath for Thought?: Between Religion and Philosophy, Fordham University Press, 2005
- God and the Between, Blackwell, 2008.
- Being Between: Conditions of Irish Thought, Leabhar Breac/Center for Irish Studies, 2008.
- The William Desmond Reader, ed. Chris Simpson, SUNY Press, 2012.
- The Intimate Strangeness of Being: Metaphysics after Dialectic, Catholic University of America Press, 2012.
- The Intimate Universal: The Hidden Porosity Among Religion, Art, Philosophy, and Politics, Columbia University Press, 2016. (Winner of the J.N. Findlay Award of the Metaphysical Society of America, 2019.)
- The Gift of Beauty and the Passion of Being: On the Threshold between the Aesthetic and the Religious, Wipf and Stock, 2018.
- The Voiding of Being: The Doing and Undoing of Metaphysics in Modernity, Catholic University of America Press, 2019.
- Godsends: From Default Atheism to the Surprise of Revelation, Notre Dame University Press, 2021.
- Wayward and Homebound: Irish Betweenings, Philosophical Thought, and Writing, SUNY Press, 2025.

== Articles ==
- "Hegel's God, Transcendence, and the Counterfeit Double: A Figure of Dialectical Equivocity?". Owl of Minerva. 36 (2): 91–110. 2005. doi:10.5840/owl20053627. ISSN 0030-7580.
