= Lawrence Cahoone =

American philosopher

- Born: 1954 (age 71–72)

Academic background
- Education: Clark University (BA); Stony Brook University (MA, PhD)
- Thesis: The Dynamics of Subjectivism: Philosophy of Modernity (1985)
- Doctoral advisor: Edward S. Casey

Academic work
- Era: Contemporary philosophy
- Region: Western philosophy
- Institutions: College of the Holy Cross

Lawrence Edward Cahoone (born 1954) is a professor emeritus of philosophy at College of the Holy Cross. Born in Providence, Rhode Island, he received his bachelor's degree in Psychology and Philosophy from Clark University, and his Ph.D. in Philosophy from Stony Brook University in 1985. He was Associate Professor of Philosophy at Boston University before moving to the College of the Holy Cross in 2000. He is a former president of the Metaphysical Society of America.

In addition to his work on theories of modernity (Cahoone 1987, 1995, 2003 below), philosophy of culture (Cahoone 2005), and political philosophy (Cahoone 2002), he developed a metaphysics of "ordinal naturalism" (Cahoone 2013, 2023), which argues that human mind, values, and culture can be understood as part of nature. To do this requires rethinking naturalism and its basis in natural science using two recent theories. One is "objective relativism," developed by the Columbia Naturalist philosophers Morris R. Cohen, John Herman Randall, Ernest Nagel, and Justus Buchler, as well as Charles W. Morris. Second is the notion of "emergence" originally developed by the British Emergentists, like Conwy Lloyd Morgan, and recently reprised by many scientists and philosophers, but particularly William C. Wimsatt.

Cahoone is married to the philosopher Elizabeth Baeten, formerly of Emerson College. They have two children, Harrison Baeten Cahoone and Isabel Rose Baeten Cahoone.

== Works ==
- Cahoone, Lawrence (2023-09-01). The Emergence of Value: Human Norms in a Natural World. SUNY Press. doi:10.1515/9781438494470. ISBN 978-1-4384-9447-0.
- Cahoone, Lawrence (2013-01-29). The Orders of Nature. State University of New York Press. doi:10.2307/jj.18254016. ISBN 978-1-4384-4417-8.
- Cahoone, Lawrence E. (2005-04-01). Cultural Revolutions: Reason Versus Culture in Philosophy, Politics, and Jihad. Penn State University Press. doi:10.1515/9780271030241. ISBN 978-0-271-03024-1.
- Cahoone, Lawrence E. (2002). Civil Society: The Conservative Meaning of Liberal Politics. Blackwell Publishers. ISBN 978-0-631-23205-6.
- Cahoone, Lawrence E. (1995). The Ends of Philosophy. State University of New York Press. ISBN 978-0-7914-2321-9.
- Cahoone, Lawrence E. (1987-10-15). The Dilemma of Modernity: Philosophy, Culture, and Anti-Culture. State University of New York Press. doi:10.2307/jj.18255281. ISBN 978-0-7914-9828-6.
- Cahoone, Lawrence E. (2003-02-04). From Modernism to Postmodernism: An Anthology Expanded. Wiley. ISBN 978-0-631-23213-1.
