= James Daniel Collins =

American philosopher (1917-1985)

- Born: 1917
- Died: 1985 (aged 67–68)

Education
- Education: Catholic University of America
- Thesis: The Thomistic Philosophy of the Angels (1947)

Philosophical work
- Era: Contemporary philosophy
- Region: Western philosophy
- School: Thomism
- Institutions: Saint Louis University
- Doctoral students: Daniel O. Dahlstrom

James Daniel Collins (1917–1985) was an American philosopher. He was a president of the Metaphysical Society of America and a recipient of the Aquinas Medal.
