= Newton Phelps Stallknecht =

American philosopher

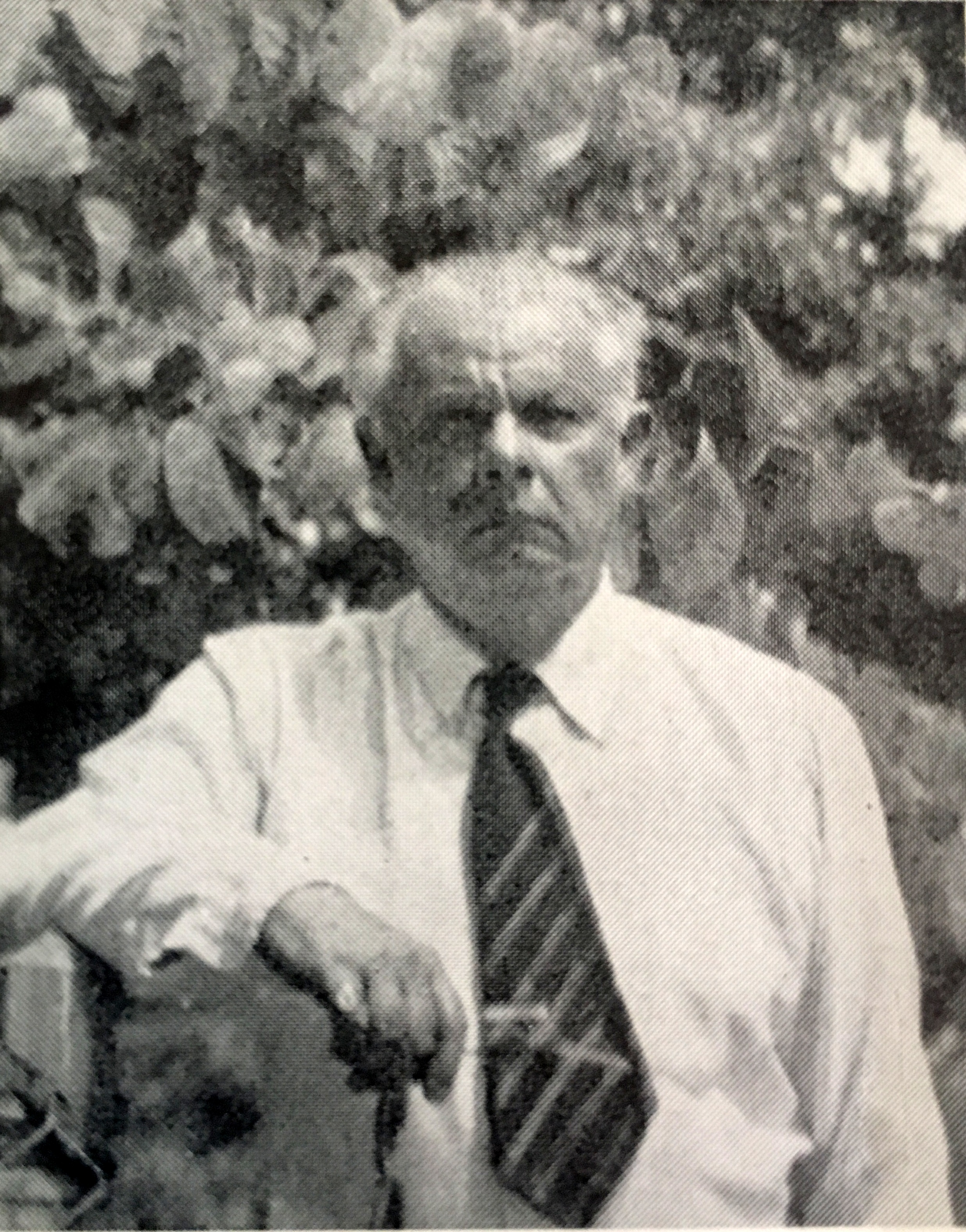
- Born: October 24, 1906; East Orange, New Jersey, U.S.
- Died: May 23, 1981 (aged 74)

Education
- Education: Princeton University
- Thesis: (1930)

Philosophical work
- Era: 21st-century philosophy
- Region: Western philosophy
- School: Kantianism
- Institutions: Indiana University Bloomington

Newton Phelps Stallknecht (October 24, 1906 – May 23, 1981) was an American philosopher and a professor of comparative literature and philosophy at Indiana University Bloomington. In addition, he was the Director of the School of Letters at Indiana University Bloomington from 1953-1972. He also served as a president of the Metaphysical Society of America. Stallknecht was educated at Princeton University, achieving his A.B. in 1927, Master of Arts in 1928, and Ph.D. in 1930. During World War II, he was attached to the United States Army Security Agency in Washington. His publications cover both philosophy and comparative literature, with a philosophical focus on Immanuel Kant, Henri Bergson, and Alfred North Whitehead.
