= Sandra B. Rosenthal =

American philosopher (1936–2024)

- Born: September 27, 1936
- Died: July 22, 2024 (aged 87)

Philosophical work
- Era: 21st-century philosophy
- Region: Western philosophy
- Main interests: Business ethics

Sandra Brener Rosenthal (September 27, 1936 – July 22, 2024) was an American philosopher and former Provost Distinguished Professor of Philosophy at Loyola University New Orleans. She was a former president of the Metaphysical Society of America (1996). She died on July 22, 2024, at the age of 87.

== Books ==
- C. I. Lewis in Focus: The Pulse of Pragmatism, Indiana University Press, 2007
- Charles Peirce's Pragmatic Pluralism (SUNY Series in Philosophy)
- Mead and Merleau-Ponty: Toward A Common Vision
- Rethinking Business Ethics: A Pragmatic Approach (The Ruffin Series in Business Ethics)
- Speculative Pragmatism
- Pragmatism and Phenomenology: A Philosophic Encounter
- Time, Continuity, and Indeterminacy: A Pragmatic Engagement with Contemporary Perspectives
- Pragmatic a Priori
