= Oliva Blanchette =

American philosopher (1929–2021)

- Born: 6 May 1929
- Died: 25 June 2021 (aged 92)

Philosophical work
- Era: Contemporary philosophy
- Region: Western philosophy

Oliva Blanchette (6 May 1929 – 25 June 2021) was an American philosopher and Professor of Philosophy at Boston College. He was a former president of the Metaphysical Society of America (1999).

Blanchette won the J.N. Findlay Award of the Metaphysical Society of America in 2007 for Philosophy of Being (2002). He is also known for having translated works of Maurice Blondel into English.

== Bibliography (partial) ==
- For a Fundamental Social Ethic: A Philosophy of Social Change. Philosophical Library. 1973. ISBN 9780802221131.
- Philosophy of Being: A Reconstructive Essay in Metaphysics. Catholic University of America Press. 2002. ISBN 9780813210964.
