= Paul Weiss (philosopher) =

American philosopher

- Born: May 19, 1901; New York City, US
- Died: July 5, 2002 (aged 101); Washington, D.C., US

Education
- Education: City College of New York (BA); Harvard University (PhD)
- Thesis: The Nature of Systems (1929)
- Doctoral advisor: Alfred North Whitehead
- Other advisors: Morris Raphael Cohen; Ralph Barton Perry

Philosophical work
- Era: 20th-century philosophy
- Region: Western philosophy
- School: Process philosophy
- Institutions: Yale University; Catholic University of America
- Doctoral students: Alvin Plantinga; Richard Rorty; Robert Spitzer
- Main interests: Metaphysics
- Notable ideas: Being as a plurality of individuals unified by universal structure

Paul Weiss (/waɪs/; May 19, 1901 – July 5, 2002) was an American philosopher. He was the founder of The Review of Metaphysics and the Metaphysical Society of America.

== Early life and education ==
Paul Weiss grew up on the Lower East Side of New York City. His father, Samuel Weiss (d. 1917), was a Jewish emigrant who moved from Europe in the 1890s. He worked as a tinsmith, a coppersmith, and a boilermaker. Paul Weiss's mother, Emma Rothschild (Weiss) (d. 1915), was a Jewish emigrant who worked as a servant until she married Samuel. Born into a Jewish family, Paul lived among other Jewish families in a working-class neighborhood in the Yorkville section of Manhattan. Originally given the Hebrew name "Peretz," Weiss says in his autobiography that the name "Paul" was his "registered name" and "part of his mother's attempt to move upward in the American world." He had three brothers, two older and one younger.

Weiss graduated from Public School #77. He later enrolled at the High School of Commerce where he learned shorthand and how to type; however, he felt that he did not benefit much from the available courses. His grades began to fall, and with a little encouragement from his mother, he eventually dropped out of high school. After working many odwd jobs, Weiss enrolled at the College of the City of New York in 1924. He took free night classes in philosophy, graduating cum laude in 1927. At the College of the City of New York, he studied with Morris R. Cohen, who awakened in him an interest in the American pragmatist and logician Charles Sanders Peirce. During this period he also met Victoria Brodkin (d. 1953), whom he would later marry on October 27, 1928. They had two children: Judith, who was born in 1935, and Jonathan, who was born in 1939.

Upon receiving his B.A. from the City College of New York, Weiss immediately enrolled at Harvard, where he studied philosophy under Étienne Gilson, William Ernest Hocking, C. I. Lewis, Ralph Barton Perry, and Alfred North Whitehead. Under the direction of Whitehead, Weiss went on to receive his Ph.D. from Harvard in 1929.

Weiss's first semester at Harvard proved to be a busy one. He volunteered to help Charles Hartshorne in the monumental task of editing the thousands of scattered pages Charles S. Peirce had left behind for publication by Harvard University Press. C. I. Lewis, who was at the time the department chair of philosophy at Harvard, eventually approved Weiss to work alongside Hartshorne for the remainder of the project. The first six volumes of Peirce's work would eventually be published between 1931 and 1935. Weiss was mainly responsible for the second, third, and fourth volumes. Two more volumes, both edited by Arthur Burks, would later appear in the 1950s.

== Teaching ==
In 1931 Paul Weiss left Harvard and began teaching philosophy at Bryn Mawr. As Weiss explains, Bryn Mawr was at the time "the self-chosen destination of the most intellectual, intelligent, determined, and well-prepared young women in America." Some fifteen years later in 1946, Weiss was invited to teach at Yale for a term as a substitute for Brand Blanshard. He accepted and what began as a temporary job turned into a permanent position that lasted for twenty four years. He comments that his experience at Yale was quite different from Bryn Mawr. "I was there faced with men—no women were enrolled in the undergraduate school until more than two decades later—many of whom had just returned from military service. They were older, some having gone through searing experiences, no longer enjoying the cozy atmosphere of their preparatory schools. I seemed to be just the teacher they needed and wanted." Weiss remained at Yale until 1969 when he reached Yale's mandatory retirement age. Shortly after, he was offered the Schweitzer Chair of philosophy at Fordham University, but the offer was quickly retracted, allegedly due to Weiss's age. Weiss challenged Fordham's decision in an age discrimination lawsuit, but in the end he lost. In the early 1970s, Weiss began teaching at the Catholic University of America. In 1992 Weiss's contract with the university was not renewed. Again he felt that age discrimination played a role in the university's decision. Weiss and his son Jonathan, a lawyer and director of Legal Services for the Elderly in New York, challenged the Catholic University of America's decision. The Equal Employment Opportunity Commission investigated the case and eventually ruled in Weiss's favor. His contract with the Catholic University of America was renewed until 1994 when Weiss voluntarily retired.

== Philosophical work ==
Weiss was responsible for founding the scholarly journal The Review of Metaphysics in 1947. He also went on to found a notable philosophical organization, the Metaphysical Society of America, in 1950.

Among his philosophical works, Weiss is mainly known for his metaphysical writings, such as Being and Other Realities. His other works include books and articles in epistemology and cosmology. He even published eleven volumes under the title Philosophy in Process, detailing his continuing and sometimes daily reflections over the years 1955–1987. A recurring point in Weiss's philosophy is the claim that Being consists of a plurality of individuals that are unified by universality, which gives a structure to all there is, but that it is also irreducible in four distinct ways. During his prime, Weiss maintained a style of philosophy that was considered by many to be out-of-date. Weiss was opposed to various philosophies that were popular at the time, including that of the analytics, that of the logical positivists, and that of the Marxists. His was a philosophy which engaged in grand-scale philosophical system-building, much in the style of Kant, Hegel, or Peirce.

As a philosopher, Weiss's students reported that he could be "fierce in argument" while maintaining "gentleness" and "personal regard for his students." John Silber, one of Weiss's former students, said of him, "In order to study philosophy with Paul, one had to philosophize. And Paul's dialectical powers gave credence to Plato's account of those powers exercised by Socrates himself."

== Death ==
Weiss died on July 5, 2002 at the age of 101. His final book, Surrogates, was published shortly after his death. Most of Weiss's papers were donated to the Morris Library at Southern Illinois University Carbondale. After his death, his remaining papers and his extensive library (and also the legal papers, French and Russian translations, novels, and other non-fiction books of his son) were bequeathed to the Institute for American Thought housed at Indiana University–Purdue University Indianapolis (IUPUI) and the IUPUI University Library.

== In popular media ==
In a June 13, 1968, guest appearance on the nationally televised The Dick Cavett Show, Weiss argued that fellow guest James Baldwin was excessively focused on the Black experience. The exchange was featured in Raoul Peck's documentary I Am Not Your Negro, and described by media reviewer A. O. Scott: the "initial spectacle of mediocrity condescending to genius is painful, but the subsequent triumph of [Baldwin's] self-taught brilliance over credentialed ignorance is thrilling to witness".

== Bibliography ==
- Collected Papers of Charles Sanders Peirce, vol. 1: Principles of Philosophy (co-editor). Cambridge (Mass.), Harvard University Press. 1931.
- Collected Papers of Charles Sanders Peirce, vol. 2: Elements of Logic (editor). Cambridge (Mass.), Harvard University Press. 1932.
- Collected Papers of Charles Sanders Peirce, vol. 3: Exact Logic (editor). Cambridge (Mass.), Harvard University Press. 1933.
- Collected Papers of Charles Sanders Peirce, vol. 4: The Simplest Mathematics (editor). Cambridge (Mass.), Harvard University Press. 1934.
- Collected Papers of Charles Sanders Peirce, vol. 5: Pragmatism and Pragmaticism (co-editor). Cambridge (Mass.), Harvard University Press. 1935.
- Collected Papers of Charles Sanders Peirce, vol. 6: Scientific Metaphysics (co-editor). Cambridge (Mass.), Harvard University Press. 1935.
- Reality. Carbondale, Southern Illinois University Press. 1938.
- Nature and Man. New York: Henry Holt & Co. 1947.
- Man's Freedom. New Haven: Yale University Press, 1950.
- Modes of Being. Carbondale, Southern Illinois University Press, 1958.
- Our Public Life. Bloomington, Indiana University Press.1959.
- Nine Basic Arts. Carbondale, Southern Illinois University Press.1961.
- The World of Art. Carbondale, Southern Illinois University Press. 1961.
- History: Written and Lived. Carbondale, Southern Illinois University Press. 1962.
- The God We Seek. Carbondale, Southern Illinois University Press.1964.
- The Making of Men. Carbondale, Southern Illinois University Press. 1967.
- Right & Wrong: A Philosophical Dialogue Between Father and Son. Carbondale, Southern Illinois University Press 1967.
- Sport: A Philosophical Inquiry (1969),
- Beyond All Appearances. Carbondale, Southern Illinois University Press, 1974.
- Cinematics. Carbondale, Southern Illinois University Press, 1975.
- First Considerations. Carbondale, Southern Illinois University Press, 1977.
- You, I, and the Others. Carbondale, Southern Illinois University Press, 1980.
- Privacy. Carbondale, Southern Illinois University Press, 1983.
- Toward A Perfected State. Albany (N.Y.), State University of New York Press, 1986.
- Creativity and Common Sense: Essays in Honor of Paul Weiss. Albany (N.Y.), State University of New York Press, 1987.
- Philosophy in Process, Vol. 1–11. Carbondale, Southern Illinois University Press. 1966–1989.
- Creative Ventures. Carbondale, Southern Illinois University Press, 1992.
- Being and Other Realities. Chicago, Open Court Publishing Co. 1995.
- Emphatics. Nashville, Vanderbilt University Press, 2000.
- Surrogates. Bloomington (IN), Indiana University Press, 2002.

== See also ==
- American philosophy
- List of American philosophers
