= Ivor Leclerc =

American philosopher (1915–1999)

- Born: 9 February 1915; Dordrecht, South Africa
- Died: 16 May 1999 (aged 84); Washington, D.C., U.S.

Philosophical work
- Era: 21st-century philosophy
- Region: Western philosophy
- Institutions: Emory University

Ivor Leclerc (9 February 1915 – 16 May 1999) was an American philosopher and Professor of Philosophy at Emory University. He was a president of the Metaphysical Society of America.

== Books ==
- The Philosophy of Nature
- The Nature of Physical Existence
- Whitehead's metaphysics,: An introductory exposition
- The Relevance of Whitehead: Philosophical Essays in Commemoration of the Centenary of the Birth of Alfred North Whitehead
