= George Peter Klubertanz =

American philosopher (1917-1985)

- Born: 1912
- Died: 5 July 1972 (aged 59–60)

Philosophical work
- Era: 20th-century philosophy
- Region: Western philosophy

George Peter Klubertanz (1912 – 5 July 1972) was an American philosopher and Professor of Philosophy at Saint Louis University. He was a president of the Metaphysical Society of America.

== Books ==
- Being and God; an introduction to the philosophy of being and to natural theology (New York, Appleton-Century-Crofts, [1963])
- Introduction to the philosophy of being. (New York : Appleton-Century-Crofts, [1955])
- The philosophy of human nature. (New York, Appleton-Century-Crofts, [1953])
- St. Thomas Aquinas on analogy : textual analysis and systematic synthesis / (Chicago : Loyola University Press, 1960)
