= Edward Pols =

American philosopher (1917-1985)

- Born: 1919
- Died: 2005

Education
- Education: Harvard University (PhD)
- Thesis: The idea of freedom in the metaphysics of Whitehead (1949)

Philosophical work
- Era: Contemporary philosophy
- Region: Western philosophy
- School: Process philosophy

Edward Pols (1919–2005) was an American philosopher and Professor of Philosophy at Bowdoin College. He was a president of the Metaphysical Society of America.

He won the J.N. Findlay Award of the Metaphysical Society of America in 1994 for Radical Realism (1992).

== Works ==
- Acts of our being a reflection on agency and responsibility
- Meditation on a prisoner: towards understanding action and mind
- Mind regained
- Radical realism: direct knowing in science and philosophy
- The recognition of reason
- Whitehead's metaphysics: a critical examination of Process and Reality
