= Robert Brumbaugh =

American philosopher (1918–1992)

Robert Sherrick Brumbaugh
- Born: December 2, 1918
- Died: July 14, 1992 (aged 73)

Philosophical work
- Era: 21st-century philosophy
- Region: Western philosophy

Robert Sherrick Brumbaugh (December 2, 1918 – July 14, 1992) was an American philosopher and a professor of medieval philosophy at Yale University. He was a president of the Metaphysical Society of America.

== Works ==
- 1962-73. Plato manuscripts: a catalogue of microfilms in the Plato microfilm project, Yale University Library. New Haven. OCLC 1100649235.
- 1973. Plato on the one: the hypotheses in the Parmenides. Port Washington, N.Y.: Kennikat. OCLC 463144406.
- 1975. Ancient Greek gadgets and machines. Westport: Greenwood Press. OCLC 963371977.
- 1978. The most mysterious manuscript: the Voynich 'Roger Bacon' cipher manuscript. Carbondale [etc.]; London [etc.: Southern Illinois University Press; Feffer and Simons. ISBN 978-0-8093-0808-8. OCLC 906244693.
- 1992. Western philosophic systems and their cyclic transformations. Carbondale: Southern Illinois University Press. OCLC 706872460.
- 1997. Unreality and time. Albany, N.Y.: State University of New York Press. ISBN 978-0-585-06320-1. OCLC 1052974395.
- 2018. Plato for the Modern Age. Chicago: Muriwai Books. ISBN 978-1-78912-208-4. OCLC 1291317848.
