= Thomas Langan =

American philosopher (1929–2012)

- Born: Thomas D. Langan; 1929
- Died: May 25, 2012 (aged 82–83)
- Spouse: Janine Langan

Philosophical work
- Era: Contemporary philosophy
- Region: Western philosophy

Thomas D. Langan (1929 – May 25, 2012) was an American philosopher and president of the Metaphysical Society of America from 1982 to 1983. Langan was a lifelong Thomist, a noted expert in the 20th-century philosophy of Martin Heidegger, and a co-author, with Etienne Gilson, of a two-volume history of philosophy.

== Biography ==
=== Early life ===
Thomas D. Langan was born March 20, 1929, in St. Louis, Missouri. He received his bachelor’s in philosophy from St. Louis University in 1951, and his Masters in 1952. Langan served in the United States Air Force as a 1st Lieutenant from 1952 to 1954, and received his Ph.D. in philosophy from Institut Catholique de Paris in 1956.

=== Professional achievements ===
- Professor at St. Louis University, 1956–1960.
- Fulbright Scholar at the University of Freiburg, 1962–1963.
- Professor at Indiana University, 1960–1967
- Chair of Philosophy at Indiana University, 1965–1967
- Professor at University of Toronto, beginning in 1967
- Professor at St. Michael’s College, beginning in 1978
- Retired in 1994

== Bibliography ==
His philosophical books include: The Catholic Tradition, Surviving the Age of Virtual Reality, The Meaning of Heidegger: A Critical Study of an Existentialist Phenomenology, Tradition and Authenticity in the Search for Ecumenic Wisdom, and Being and Truth and Self Discovery.
