= Donald W. Sherburne =

American philosopher (1929–2021)

- Born: April 21, 1929; Proctor, Vermont, United States
- Died: April 21, 2021 (aged 92); Saint Petersburg, Florida, United States

Philosophical work
- Era: 21st-century philosophy
- Region: Western philosophy
- Institutions: Vanderbilt University

Donald W. Sherburne (April 21, 1929 – April 21, 2021) was an American philosopher and Emeritus Professor of Philosophy, Vanderbilt University. He was a former president of the Metaphysical Society of America (1994). He was born in Rutland, Vermont, the son of Hermon Kirk Sherburne, Jr. and Alma May Bixby Sherburne.
