= George R. Lucas Jr. =

American philosopher

- Born: George Ramsdell Lucas Jr. September 8, 1949 (age 77)
- Spouse: Patricia J. Cook

Education
- Education: College of William & Mary (BS); Northwestern University (PhD)
- Thesis: Two Views of Freedom in Process Thought: A Study of Hegel and Whitehead (1978)

Philosophical work
- Era: Contemporary philosophy
- Region: Western philosophy
- School: Process philosophy
- Institutions: United States Naval Academy; Naval Postgraduate School
- Main interests: Military ethics, just war theory, ethics of cyberwarfare, metaphysics
- Notable ideas: Emergence of ethical norms from practice in cyberwarfare

George Ramsdell Lucas Jr. (born September 8, 1949) is an American philosopher and a professor of ethics and public policy at the Graduate School of Public Policy at the Naval Postgraduate School. Previously, he was the Distinguished Chair in Ethics in the Vice Admiral James B. Stockdale Center for Ethical Leadership at the U.S. Naval Academy. Lucas is a former president of the Metaphysical Society of America (2016).

== Books ==
- Ethics and Cyber Warfare (Oxford University Press, 2017)
- Military Ethics: What Everyone Needs to Know (Oxford University Press, 2016)
- The Routledge Handbook of Military Ethics (Routledge, 2015)
- Anthropologists in Arms: The Ethics of Military Anthropology (AltaMira Press, 2009)
- Perspectives on Humanitarian Military Intervention (University of California Press, 2001)
- Ethics and Military Strategy in the 21st Century: Moving Beyond Clausewitz (Routledge, 2019)
