= George Lucas (footballer, born 1920) =

Australian rules footballer

Personal information
- Full name: George Keith Lucas
- Born: 18 August 1920; Clifton Hill, Victoria
- Died: 13 November 1969 (aged 49); Brighton, Victoria
- Original team: Brighton
- Height: 175 cm (5 ft 9 in)
- Weight: 74 kg (163 lb)

Playing career^{1}
Years	Club	Games (Goals)
1941–46	Brighton (VFA)	30 (20)
1947	South Melbourne	4 (1)
- ^{1} Playing statistics correct to the end of 1947.

George Keith Lucas (18 August 1920 – 13 November 1969) was an Australian rules footballer who played with South Melbourne in the Victorian Football League (VFL).
