= Francis I. Parker =

American judge

Associate Justice of the North Carolina Supreme Court
- In office 1986–1986
- Appointed by: James G. Martin

Personal details
- Born: August 21, 1923 Charlotte, North Carolina, U.S.
- Died: March 5, 2008 (aged 84)
- Spouse: Mary Sommers Booth
- Children: 3
- Parent: John J. Parker (father)
- Education: University of North Carolina
- Occupation: Judge

Francis I. Parker (August 21, 1923 – March 5, 2008) was an American judge. He was an associate justice of the North Carolina Supreme Court.

== Life and career ==
Parker was born in Charlotte, North Carolina, the son of John J. Parker, a judge. He attended Woodberry Forest School and the University of North Carolina. He served in the United States Navy during World War II and the Korean conflict.

In 1986, Parker was appointed by Governor James G. Martin to serve as an associate justice of the North Carolina Supreme Court.

Parker died in March 2008, at the age of 84.
