= W. Norris Clarke =

American philosopher (1915-2008)

The Reverend William Norris Clarke SJ
- Born: 1 June 1915
- Died: 10 June 2008 (aged 93)

Philosophical work
- Era: 21st-century philosophy
- Region: Western philosophy
- School: Thomism

William Norris Clarke, SJ (1 June 1915 – 10 June 2008) was an American Thomist philosopher and Jesuit priest.

== Positions ==
He was a president of the Metaphysical Society of America, as well as founder and editor of the International Philosophical Quarterly.

== Thought ==
Clarke did not allow his philosophical quest to be limited by traditional interpretations of the philosophy of St. Thomas Aquinas. He insisted that:

interpersonal phenomenologies need the ontological grounding of dynamic substance or nature as a unified center for its many relations and its self-identity through time; Thomistic metaphysics needs to enrich the data it is seeking to explain by the more detailed concrete descriptions of the actual life of real persons provided so richly by phenomenology.

He was a major opponent of Neo-scholastic interpretations of St. Thomas and St. Anselm of Canterbury.

== Books ==
- The Philosophical Approach to God: A Contemporary Neo-Thomistic Perspective, 1979, revised edition in 2007.
- Person and Being 1993; reprinted with additional commentary by Ranier R. A. Ibana as Person, Being and Ecology in 1996
- Explorations in Metaphysics: Being-God-Person, University of Notre Dame Press, 1995
- The One and the Many: A Contemporary Thomistic Metaphysics (2001)

== Media ==
- A Taste of Existence with W. Norris Clarke
- A Creative Retrieval of Thomism with W. Norris Clarke, S.J.
- A Reflection on God's Existence, by Fr. Norris Clarke
