= Edward Halper =

American philosopher

Edward Charles Halper
- Born: 1951 (age 74–75)

Philosophical work
- Era: 21st-century philosophy
- Region: Western philosophy

Edward Charles Halper (born March 16, 1951) is an American philosopher and Distinguished Research Professor and Josiah Meigs Distinguished Teaching Professor at University of Georgia. He is a former president of the Metaphysical Society of America (2012). He specializes in ancient Greek philosophy and Hegel, and he is especially known for his multi-volume commentary on Aristotle's Metaphysics.
