= Cardinal Mercier Prize =

Philosophy award

- Awarded for: Philosophy
- Presented by: Higher Institute of Philosophy, Université catholique de Louvain; Institute of Philosophy, KU Leuven
- Currently held by: Matti Eklund

The Cardinal Mercier Prize for International Philosophy is a prize given to recognize the recipients' contribution to international philosophy in the fields of metaphysics and ontology. It is awarded jointly by the Higher Institute of Philosophy at the Université catholique de Louvain and the Institute of Philosophy at KU Leuven. The prize is named after the theologian Cardinal Désiré-Joseph Mercier and has been won by Fulton J. Sheen in 1923, John F. Wippel in 1981, Nicholas Rescher in 2005, William Simpson in 2021, and Fabien Muller in 2023.
