= Andrew J. Reck =

American philosopher (1927–2021)

Andrew Reck
- Born: October 29, 1927; New Orleans, Louisiana
- Died: April 29, 2021 (aged 93); New Orleans, Louisiana

Philosophical work
- Era: 21st-century philosophy
- Region: Western philosophy

Andrew Joseph Reck (October 29, 1927 - April 29, 2021) was an American philosopher and emeritus professor in the Department of Philosophy at Tulane University. He was a former president of the Metaphysical Society of America.

== Life ==
He was born on October 29, 1927, in New Orleans to Andrew Gervais and Katie (Mangiaracina) Reck. He married Elizabeth (Betty) Lassiter Reck in 1987.

== Books ==
- The New American Philosophers: An Exploration of Thought Since World War 2
- Speculative Philosophy: A Study of Its Nature, Types, and Uses
