= Frederick Ferré =

Frederick Pond Ferré (March 23, 1933 – March 22, 2013) was Professor of Philosophy Emeritus at The University of Georgia. He was a past president of the Metaphysical Society of America. Much of his work concerned how metaphysics is entwined with practical questions about how we live our life, including the ethical dimensions of life.

== Education ==
- Oberlin College, 1950–51.
- Boston University, A.B. (major History) summa cum laude, 1954
- Vanderbilt University, M.A. (Philosophy of History) 1955.
- Vanderbilt University Divinity School (Theological Studies) 1955–56.
- University of St. Andrews (Scotland), Ph.D. (Philosophy of Religion) 1959.

== Work ==
His most notable contribution to scholarship was a defense of Christian metaphysics in response to the charge of people like G.E. Moore and Bertrand Russell that Christian claims are linguistically meaningless and should be rejected as such. Ferre argued that Christian metaphysics was legitimate because it passed a fourfold test of a metaphysical worldview, being consistent, coherent, applicable, and adequate.

== Bibliography ==
- Language, Logic And God (1961), Harper
- Basic Modern Philosophy Of Religion (1967) Scribner
- Being And Value : Toward A Constructive Postmodern Metaphysics (1996) State University of New York Press
- Ethics And Environmental Policy : Theory Meets Practice (1994) with Peter Hartel University of Georgia Press
- God And Global Justice : Religion And Poverty In An Unequal World (1985) with Rita H. Mataragnon, Paragon House
- Philosophy Of Technology (1988), Prentice Hall
- Hellfire And Lightning Rods : Liberating Science, Technology, And Religion (1993), Orbis Books
- Introduction To Positive Philosophy. / Edited, With Introd. And Rev. Translation, By Frederick Ferré (1970), Bobbs-Merrill
- Knowing And Value : Toward A Constructive Postmodern Epistemology (1998) State University of New York Press
- Living And Value : Toward A Constructive Postmodern Ethics (2001), State University of New York Press
- "Mapping the Logic of Models in Science and Theology" Christian Scholar, Volume 46, 1963
