= Andreas Speer =

German academic

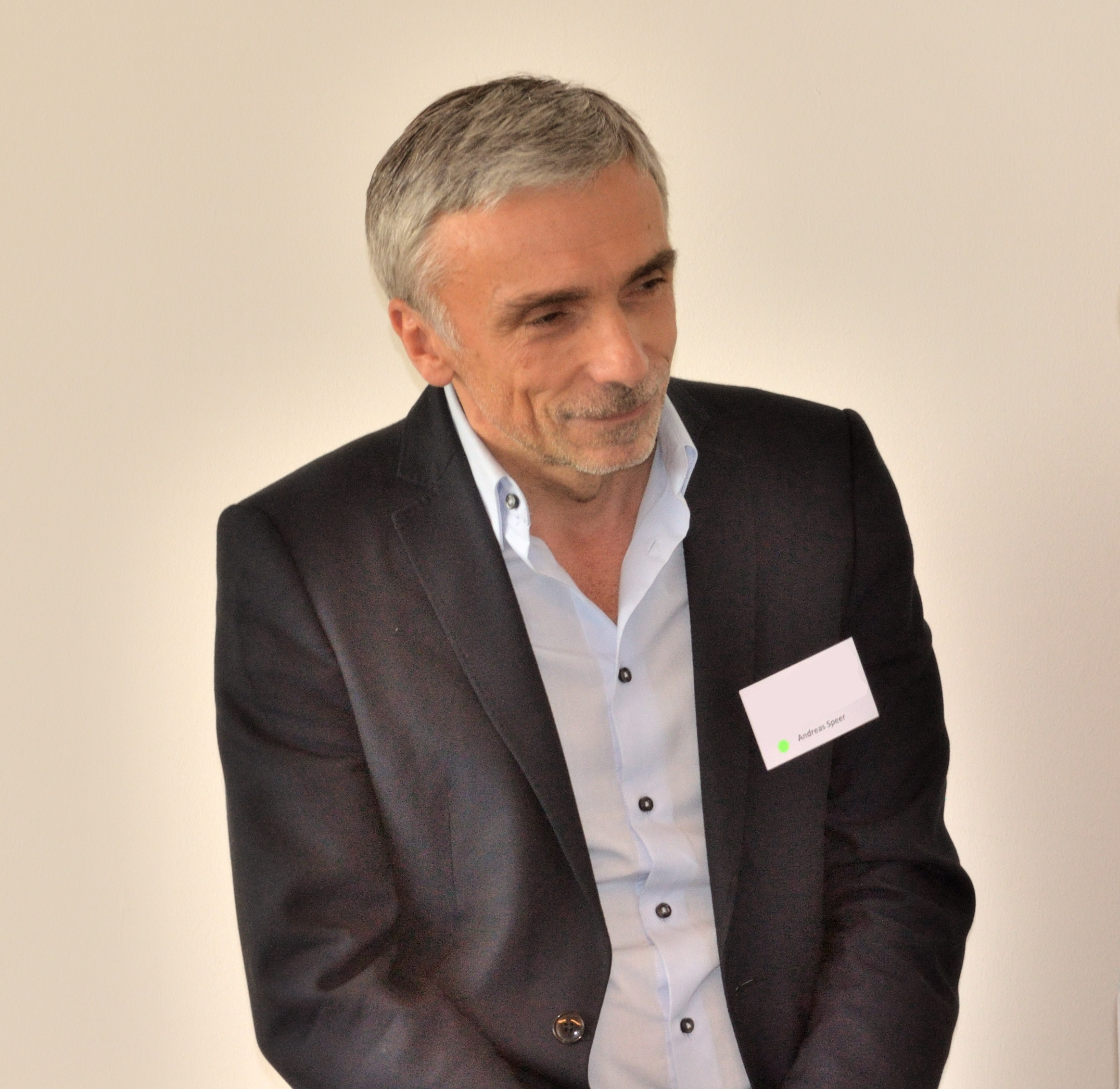
- Born: 19 June 1957 (age 68); Düsseldorf, Germany

Andreas Speer (born 19 June 1957 in Düsseldorf) is a German philosopher and professor. Since 2004 he is the director of the Thomas-Institut at the University of Cologne.

== Books ==
=== Edited ===
- Die Bibliotheca Amploniana: Ihre Bedeutung im Spannungsfeld von Aristotelismus, Nominalismus und Humanismus (Walter de Gruyter, 1995)
- Raum und Raumvorstellungen im Mittelalter (Walter de Gruyter, 1998, with Jan A. Aersten)
- Was ist Philosophie im Mittelalter? (Walter de Gruyter, 1999, with Jan A. Aersten)
