= Richard T. De George =

American philosopher (born 1933)

Richard Thomas De George
- Born: 1933 (age 92–93)

Education
- Education: Yale University

Philosophical work
- Era: 21st-century philosophy
- Region: Western philosophy

Richard Thomas De George (born 1933) is an American philosopher and University Distinguished Professor of Philosophy, of Russian and East European Studies, and of Business Administration, and Co-Director of the International Center for Ethics in Business at the University of Kansas. He is a former president of the Metaphysical Society of America (1983).
