= Eugene Thomas Long =

American philosopher (1935–2020)

- Born: Eugene Thomas Long III; March 16, 1935; Richmond, Virginia, U.S.
- Died: March 13, 2020 (aged 84); Richmond, Virginia, U.S.
- Spouse: Carolyn Macleod (m. 1960)

Philosophical work
- Era: 21st-century philosophy
- Region: Western philosophy

Eugene Thomas Long III (March 16, 1935 – March 13, 2020) was an American philosopher and Distinguished Professor Emeritus of Philosophy in the University of South Carolina. He was also president of the Metaphysical Society of America (1998).

Three days shy of his 85th birthday, Long died at his Richmond, Virginia, home on March 13, 2020, following a three-year battle with pulmonary fibrosis. He is survived by his wife of 60 years, Carolyn, and their two children.
