= Francis H. Parker =

American philosopher (1920-2004)

- Born: June 23, 1920; Kuala Lumpur, Malaysia
- Died: July 13, 2004 (aged 84); Augusta, Maine, US

Education
- Education: Harvard University (PhD)
- Doctoral advisor: John Daniel Wild, C.I. Lewis, Donald Cary Williams

Philosophical work
- Era: 21st-century philosophy
- Region: Western philosophy
- Institutions: Colby College, Haverford College

Francis Howard Parker (June 23, 1920 – July 13, 2004) was an American philosopher and Charles A. Dana Professor of Philosophy at Colby College.

== Life ==
He was born in Kuala Lumpur in Federated Malay States to Reverend Walter G. and Alma Shell Parker. He received his BA from the Evansville College in 1941, his MA from Indiana University Bloomington and his PhD from Harvard University in 1949. He was a president of the Metaphysical Society of America.

He served in the United States Army Air Forces from 1942 to 1945, where he was a flight instructor and became a captain.

He died at MaineGeneral Medical Center in Augusta on July 13, 2004, and was buried at the Friends Cemetery in Vassalboro.

== Works ==
- Logic as a human instrument, Harper 1959
- The story of western philosophy, Indiana University Press 1967
- Patterns of the Life-world: Essays in honor of John Wild, Northwestern University Press 1970
- Reason and faith revisited, Marquette University Press 1971
