= George W. Lucas (soldier) =

American Civil War soldier

- Born: c. 1845; Adams County, Illinois
- Died: May 17, 1921 (aged 75–76)
- Burial place: Mounds Cemetery, Timewell, Brown County, Illinois
- Military career
- Allegiance: United States of America; Union
- Branch: United States Army; Union Army
- Rank: Private
- Units: Company C, 3rd Missouri Cavalry Regiment
- Conflicts: American Civil War
- Awards: Medal of Honor

George Washington Lucas (c. 1845 – May 17, 1921) was an American soldier, who was a Private in the Union Army and a Medal of Honor recipient for his actions in the American Civil War.

== Medal of Honor citation ==
Rank and organization: Private, Company C, 3d Missouri Cavalry. Place and date: At Benton, Ark., July 25, 1864. Entered service at: Mt. Sterling, Brown County, Ill. Birth: Adams County, Ill. Date of issue: December 1864.

Citation:

Pursued and killed Confederate Brig. Gen. George M. Holt, Arkansas Militia, capturing his arms and horse.

== See also ==
- List of Medal of Honor recipients
- List of American Civil War Medal of Honor recipients: G–L
