= Frank Parker (footballer) =

Australian rules footballer

Personal information
- Full name: Frank Edwin Hewitt Parker
- Born: 20 September 1920; Richmond, Victoria
- Died: 7 July 2017 (aged 96); Tewantin, Queensland
- Height: 183 cm (6 ft 0 in)
- Weight: 80 kg (176 lb)

Playing career^{1}
Years	Club	Games (Goals)
1941	Hawthorn	1 (0)
- ^{1} Playing statistics correct to the end of 1941.

Frank Edwin Hewitt Parker (20 September 1920 – 7 July 2017) was an Australian rules footballer who played with Hawthorn in the Victorian Football League (VFL).

== Family ==
The son of Harry Robert Parker (1880–1963) and Ellen May Newbold (1880–1963), Frank Edwin Hewitt Parker was born in Richmond, Victoria on 20 September 1920.

He was the cousin of Ted Parker.
