= Thomas R. Flynn =

American philosopher (1936–2024)

The Reverend Thomas R. Flynn
- Born: Thomas Robert Flynn; July 2, 1936
- Died: February 29, 2024 (aged 87); Atlanta, Georgia, U.S.

Education
- Education: Columbia University (Ph.D.)

Philosophical work
- Era: 21st-century philosophy
- Region: Western philosophy

Thomas Robert Flynn (June 2, 1936 – February 29, 2024) was an American philosopher, Roman Catholic priest and Samuel Candler Dobbs Professor at Emory University. He is a former president of the Metaphysical Society of America (2011).

Flynn was ordained in 1961, and studied at Columbia University.

Flynn died on February 29, 2024, at age 87.
