= Daniel O. Dahlstrom =

American philosopher (born 1948)

- Born: Daniel Oscar Dahlstrom; 1948 (age 77–78)

Education
- Education: Saint Louis University (PhD, 1978)
- Thesis: Essence and Subjectivity in Hegel's Science of Logic (1978)
- Doctoral advisor: James Daniel Collins

Philosophical work
- Era: Contemporary philosophy
- Region: Western philosophy
- School: Continental
- Institutions: Boston University
- Main interests: Post-Kantian philosophy

Daniel Oscar Dahlstrom (born 1948) is an American philosopher and John R. Silber Professor of Philosophy at Boston University.

== Works ==
- Identity, Authenticity, and Humility. Milwaukee: Marquette University Press, 2017.
- The Heidegger Dictionary. New York: Bloomsbury Academics, 2013.
- Dahlstrom, Daniel O. (2008). Philosophical Legacies: Essays on the Thought of Kant, Hegel, and Their Contemporaries (Studies in Philosophy and the History of Philosophy, Volume 50). Catholic University of America Press. doi:10.2307/j.ctt284z77. ISBN 978-0-8132-1521-1. JSTOR j.ctt284z77.
- Heidegger’s Concept of Truth. Cambridge: Cambridge University Press, 2001.
- Das logische Vorurteil: Untersuchungen zur Wahrheitstheorie des frühen Heidegger. Vienna: Passagen, 1994.
- Dahlstrom, Daniel O., ed. (2011). Interpreting Heidegger: Critical Essays. Cambridge: Cambridge University Press. doi:10.1017/cbo9780511974465. ISBN 978-0-521-76494-0.

=== Translations ===
- Martin Heidegger. Introduction to Phenomenological Research. Bloomington, Indiana: Indiana University Press, 2005.
- Hegel, Georg Wilhelm Fredrich (2010). Brinkmann, Klaus; Dahlstrom, Daniel O. (eds.). Georg Wilhelm Friedrich Hegel: Encyclopedia of the Philosophical Sciences in Basic Outline. doi:10.1017/9780511780226. ISBN 978-0-511-78022-6.
- (with Corey W. Dyck). Moses Mendelssohn. Morning Hours. Amsterdam: Springer, 2011.
- Edmund Husserl. Ideas I. Indianapolis: Hackett, 2014.

=== Articles ===
- Dahlstrom, Daniel O. (1998). "Hegel's Appropriation of Kant's Account of Teleology in Nature". Proceedings of the Hegel Society of America. 13: 167–188. doi:10.5840/hsaproceedings1998149. ISSN 2472-4637.
