= The Review of Metaphysics =

- Discipline: Philosophy
- Language: English
- Edited by: Michael Rohlf

Publication details
- History: 1947–present
- Publisher: Philosophy of Education Society, Inc. (United States)
- Frequency: Quarterly

Standard abbreviations
- ISO 4: Rev. Metaphys.

Indexing
- ISSN: 0034-6632 (print); 2154-1302 (web)
- LCCN: 50-38404
- OCLC no.: 1763830

Links
- Journal homepage; Online access

The Review of Metaphysics is a peer-reviewed academic journal of philosophy. It was established by Paul Weiss and the first issue was published in September 1947. The journal's primary sponsor is and has been The Catholic University of America, but other major universities help sustain it.

The journal publishes articles on metaphysics and on the history of philosophy. It also has a large book review section and lists the abstracts of other English-based philosophy journals. Once a year, it publishes statistics on the philosophy graduate programs in North America. The current editor-in-chief is Michael Rohlf (School of Philosophy, The Catholic University of America).

== Notable articles (ordered by date of publication) ==
- "Who is Nietzsche's Zarathustra?" by Martin Heidegger (1967).
- "Aristotle and Plato on God as Nous and as the Good," by Stephen Menn (1992).
- "Kant's Empiricism," by Lorne Falkenstein (1997).
- "The Paradoxes of Hylomorphism," by Gordon P. Barnes (2003).
- "Stanley Rosen's Critique of Leo Strauss," by Alexander S. Duff (2010).
- "Aristotle's Psychological Approach to the Idea of Luck," by Daniel Schillinger (2019).

== See also ==
- List of philosophy journals
