= R. E. Houser =

Philosopher and professor

Rollen Edward Houser
- Spouse: Mary Catherine Sommers
- Children: 4

Education
- Education: University of Texas at Austin (BA); University of Toronto (MA, STL, PhD)
- Thesis: Thomas Aquinas on Transcendental Unity: The Scholastics and Aristotelian Predecessors (1981)
- Doctoral advisor: Edward A. Synan

Rollen Edward Houser is a Thomistic philosopher and professor emeritus at the University of St. Thomas in Houston, Texas.

== Biography ==
Raised in Texas, Hauser earned a liberal arts degree from the University of Texas at Austin in 1968. He was a member of Phi Beta Kappa. After graduation, he served in the US military until 1970, including a deployment to Vietnam. In 1970, Hauser entered the Pontifical Institute of Mediaeval Studies at the University of Toronto, earning an M.A. in 1973, a licentiate in 1976, and a Ph.D. in 1981.

Houser taught at Niagara University from 1976 to 1987 before taking a post at the University of St. Thomas in Houston, Texas. He retired in 2018, and in 2019 he was awarded the Aquinas Medal from the American Catholic Philosophical Association. In view of the award, Archbishop J. Michael Miller said, "Dr. Ed Houser has made an outstanding contribution to scholarship on St Thomas."

Hauser is married to Mary Catherine Sommers, also a faculty member at the University of St. Thomas. They have four children.

== Bibliography ==
- The Cardinal Virtues: Aquinas, Albert, Philip the Chancellor (Pontifical Institute of Mediaeval Studies, 2004)
- Logic as a Liberal Art: An Introduction to Rhetoric and Reasoning (The Catholic University of America Press, 2020)
