= R. James Long =

Historian of medieval philosophy

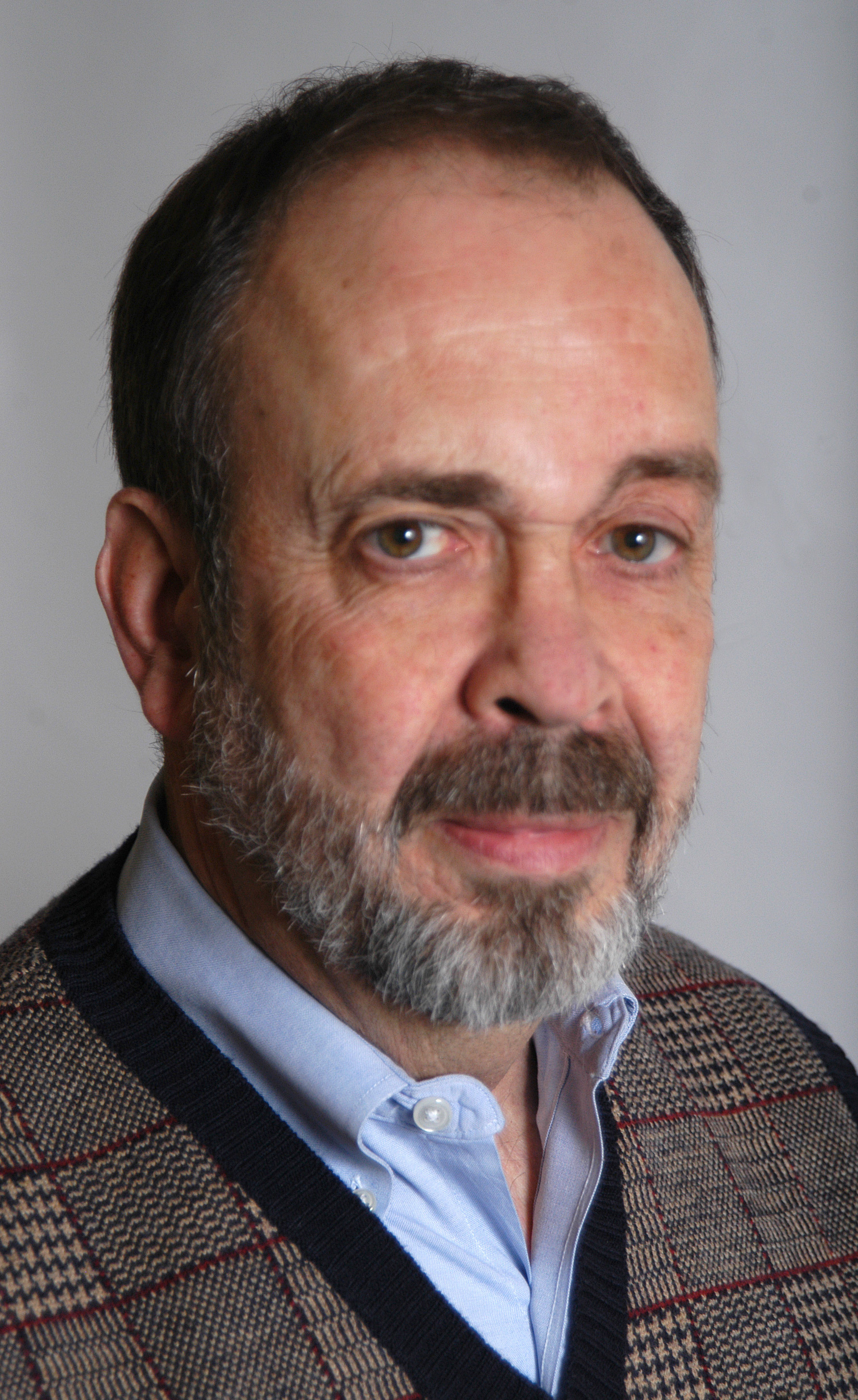
- Long in 2005
- Born: Raymond James Long; December 15, 1938 (age 87); Rochester, New York, U.S.
- Education: Pontifical Institute of Mediaeval Studies (M.S.L., 1966); University of Toronto (Ph.D., 1968)
- Occupation: Professor of philosophy at Fairfield University
- Spouse: Wendy Lesniak
- Children: 3, including Justin
- Relatives: Kate Bosworth (daughter-in-law)

Raymond James Long (born December 15, 1938) is an American academic and professor emeritus of philosophy at Fairfield University in Fairfield, Connecticut. He is also a faculty member at St. John Fisher Seminary in Stamford, Connecticut. Long was the president of the Society for Medieval and Renaissance Philosophy.

== Biography ==
Long was born Raymond James Long on December 15, 1938 in Rochester, New York to Lorraine (née Iuppa; 1917–2022) and Raymond Long (1914–1993). He is the oldest of five children with two younger brothers and two younger sisters. Long has published nine books, including The Life and Works of Richard Fishacre, O.P., Prolegomena to the Edition of his Commentary on the "Sentences", published in 1999; editions of parts one and two of the second book of Fishacre's Sentences Commentary (2008 and 2011); "Adam of Bockenfield, 'Glossaae super De vegetabilibus et plantis': A Critical Edition with Introduction"; and, most recently "Hagar's Vocation. Philosophy's Role in the Theology of Richard Fishacre" (CUA Press, 2015).

Of German and Italian ancestry, Long has also authored more than 60 articles on medieval philosophy (which include editions of the works of such writers as Alfred of Sareshel, Bartholomaeus Anglicus, the anonymous author of a Peterhouse manuscript on the science of botany, in addition to his work on Fishacre and Adam of Bockenfield), and was the recipient of numerous academic awards, including a Fulbright Scholarship Fulbright Program, a Canada Council Postdoctoral Fellowship and a NEH Text and Editions Grant. Long received a licentiate in medieval studies from the Pontifical Institute of Mediaeval Studies in 1966 and earned his doctorate from the University of Toronto in 1968.

== Personal life ==
Long is married to former Broadway actress Wendy Lesniak, with whom he has three sons named Damian (b. 1976), Justin (b. 1978), and Christian (b. 1981). Long has 4 grandchildren and 3 daughters-in-law.
