= Jorge J. E. Gracia =

Cuban-born American philosopher (1942–2021)

- Born: 18 July 1942; Cuba
- Died: 13 July 2021 (aged 78); Philadelphia, Pennsylvania, United States

Education
- Education: University of Toronto

Philosophical work
- Era: Contemporary philosophy
- Region: Western philosophy
- Institutions: State University of New York at Buffalo
- Website: and

Jorge J. E. Gracia (July 18, 1942 – July 13, 2021) was a Cuban-born American philosopher who was the Samuel P. Capen Chair, SUNY Distinguished Professor in the Department of Philosophy and Department of Comparative Literature in the State University of New York at Buffalo. Gracia was educated in Cuba, the United States, Canada, and Spain, and received his Ph.D. in Medieval Philosophy from the University of Toronto.

Gracia authored or edited over forty books. His areas of specialization included Metaphysics/Ontology, Philosophical Historiography, Philosophy of Language/Hermeneutics, Ethnicity/Race/Nationality Issues, Hispanic/Latino Issues, Medieval/Scholastic Philosophy and Hispanic/Latino/Latin-AmericanPhilosophy. While Gracia's earlier work was primarily in the areas of Medieval Philosophy and Metaphysics, much of his recent work has focused on issues of race, ethnicity and identity. His contributions to the philosophical study of race and ethnicity have been groundbreaking. It is within this area that Gracia proposed his familial-historical view of ethnicity and his genetic common-bundle view of race. These views of race and ethnicity have helped to shape the field and addressed many issues that previous theories had left unanswered.

Gracia was the founding chair of the APA Committee for Hispanics in Philosophy, past president of the Society for Medieval and Renaissance Philosophy, past president of the Society for Iberian and Latin American Thought, past president of the American Catholic Philosophical Association, and past president of the Metaphysical Society of America.

Gracia had a number of Ph.D. students, such as Peter Redpath, William Irwin, Robert Delfino, Jonathan Sanford, Daniel Novotný, etc. who have become professors at academic institutions.

== Education ==
Gracia studied architecture at Universidad de La Habana and also took classes at Escuela Nacional de Bellas Artes San Alejandro, both in Havana, Cuba, for a year before coming to United States and earning a B.A. in philosophy at Wheaton College (Ill.) in 1965. In his book Painting Borges, he narrates how he changed his field of study from architecture to mathematics to English literature to philosophy because he became "enthralled by language" and "craved ... to know [its] secret." He received his M.A. in philosophy from University of Chicago in 1966, M.S.L. (Licentiate in Mediaeval Studies) in philosophy from Pontifical Institute of Mediaeval Studies in 1970, and Ph.D. in Medieval philosophy from University of Toronto in 1971. During his graduate studies he spent a year (1969–1970) at Institut d'Estudis Catalans for study and research.

== Work ==
=== History of medieval philosophy ===
Gracia has written extensively on the problem of individuation in the early Middle Ages. Within this context, he has explored Boethius and his metaphysical and logical approaches to the problem of individuation. He has also dealt with the metaphysical views of Thierry of Chartres, Gilbert of Potiers, Peter Abailard and others. He wrote the first book on the development of the problem of individuation in the early Middle Ages, the period that goes from the 6th century to the 14th. In this book, he applied a new, analytic problems approach method to the history of medieval philosophy.

Gracia has studied and written on the philosophy of Thomas Aquinas, focusing on Aquinas' Christian philosophy, his approach to universals, and his metaphysics of thought and existence.

=== History of Spanish philosophy ===
Gracia has explored the work of Francisco Suárez, focusing on his metaphysics as well as the issues of individuation and good and evil. He has also translated Suárez's Disputations V, X, and XI and published commentaries and editions of these. He has also studied Ramon Llull's work on metaphysics and individuation and written on José Ortega y Gasset.

=== Contemporary Latin American and Latino philosophy ===
Gracia has published many articles on the work of Latin American philosophers and explored their work in terms of the impact it has had upon Latin America. The research has also extended to the exploration of Latin American art and literature. He was a pioneer in this field. The anthology on Latin American philosophy he edited in the mid-1980s was the first work of its nature published in English by a philosopher.

=== Philosophical historiography ===
Gracia's work in this area has examined the concept of Hispanic philosophy and presented a historico-relational understanding of it. In addition, Gracia has described the origin of Hispanic philosophy in the 16th century. He presented a historical account of discussions concerning the controversy about the nature of Latin-American philosophy and developed a historiographical model for the understanding of Hispanic thought.

Gracia has also focused on a systematic treatment of the main issues involved in philosophical historiography. He has dealt with such topics as the relation of philosophy to its history, the role of value judgments in historical accounts, the value of the history of philosophy for philosophy, the nature and role of texts and their interpretation in the history of philosophy, historiographical method, and the stages of development and progress of philosophical ideas. His book on the historiography of philosophy is the most comprehensive study of this topic in English.

=== Metaphysics ===
Gracia has published many works in the area of metaphysics. He has devoted extensive time dealing with the metaphysical/ontological issues posed by categories. In this work, Gracia has also offered a systematic analysis of the nature of metaphysics which provides an answer as to why metaphysics always recovers from the many attacks to which it has been subjected throughout its history. Apart from a new conception of metaphysics and an explanation of the resilience of the discipline, Gracia presents an understanding of the nature and ontological status of categories, an analysis of the nature of reductionism and its role in philosophy, and a discussion and criticism of the main views concerning the nature of metaphysics developed in the history of philosophy. Gracia also distinguishes six fundamental issues in the metaphysics of individuality: intension, extension, ontological status, the principle of individuation, discernibility, and reference. He has taken new and controversial positions in all these topics.

=== Hermeneutics ===
Gracia has written on the logical and epistemological dimensions of a theory of textuality which takes into account the relevant views of both analytic and Continental thinkers and also of some major historical figures. He has given a logical analysis of the notion of text resulting from a definition that serves as the basis for the distinctions subsequently drawn between texts on the one hand and language, artifacts, art objects, and works on the other; and for the classification of texts according to modality and function. He has used his conclusions in this area to solve the various epistemological issues which have been raised about texts by philosophers of language, semioticians, hermeneuticists, literary critics, semanticists, aestheticians, and historiographers. Gracia has provided an ontological characterization of texts; it explores the issues raised by the identity of various texts; and it presents a view of the identity and function of authors and audiences and of their relations to texts.

=== Race, ethnicity, and nationality ===
Gracia has examined the nature of tradition and how a proper metaphysical understanding of this notion as a kind of action clarifies its various uses and helps us understand in turn how communication, the preservation of knowledge, and group identity take place. He has also published a systematic discussion of the notions of race, ethnicity, and nationality. He has written on the metaphysical questions of "What is race?" and "What is ethnicity." It is within this area that Gracia has proposed his familial-historical view of ethnicity and his genetic common-bundle view of race. These views of race and ethnicity have helped to shape the field and addressed many issues that previous theories had left unanswered.

=== Hispanic/Latino Issues ===
Gracia published systematic discussions of social issues that affect Latinos/Hispanics in American society. As well, Gracia presents a familial/relational theory of Hispanic/Latino identity. In addition he discusses such topics as the nature of ethnicity, the proper name for Hispanics/Latinos, the origin of Hispanic/Latino identity, the role of mestizaje in Hispanic/Latino identity, the history of discussions of Latin American identity in Latin America, and the situation of Hispanics/Latinos in American philosophy today. Within this work Gracia takes into account recent research in various disciplines: anthropology, sociology, history, philosophy, literature, and Latino studies. Gracia's book on Hispanic/Latino identity as the first published book on this topic.

Gracia has also published a systematic discussion of the nature and possibility of the philosophical interpretation of art with respect to Carlos Estévez work. Gracia's work also includes writing on a number of Cuban American artists, writers, and philosophers.

== Awards ==
- National Endowment for the Humanities Research Fellowship, 1981–82
- J.N. Findlay Award of the Metaphysical Society of America in 1992 for Individuality: An Essay on the Foundations of Metaphysics (1988)
- Aquinas Medal, awarded by the University of Dallas, on February 1, 2002
- University at Buffalo Teaching and Learning Award, 2003
- 67th Aquinas Lecture at Marquette University, 2003
- Director, National Endowment for the Humanities Summer Institute, Oct. 1 2004-Sept. 31, 2005
- Director, National Endowment for the Humanities Summer Seminar, Oct. 1, 2005-Sept. 31, 2006, "We the People Project"

== Bibliography ==
- Images of Thought: Philosophical Interpretations and Carlos Estévez's Art. Albany, NY: SUNY Press, 2009.
- Latinos in America: Philosophy and Social Identity. Oxford: Blackwell, 2008.
- Surviving Race, Ethnicity, and Nationality in the Twenty-First Century. Lanham, MD: Rowman & Littlefield, 2005.
- Old Wine in New Skins: The Role of Tradition in Communication, Knowledge, and Group Identity. Milwaukee, WI: Marquette University Press, 2003.
- ¿Qué son las categorías? Trans. into Spanish by Emma Ingala Gómez. In Series "Opuscula philosophica." Madrid: Ediciones Encuentro, 2002.
- How Can We Know What God Means? The Interpretation of Revelation. New York: Palgrave of St. Martin's Press.
- Hispanic/Latino Identity: A Philosophical Perspective. Oxford: Blackwell, 2000.
- Metaphysics and Its Task: The Search for the Categorial Foundation of Knowledge. Albany, NY: State University of New York Press, 1999.
- Filosofía hispánica: Concepto, origen y foco historiográfico. Pamplona: Universidad de Navarra, 1998, 135 pp.
- Texts: Ontological Status, Identity, Author, Audience. Albany, NY: State University of New York Press, 1996.
- A Theory of Textuality: The Logic and Epistemology. Albany, NY: State University of New York Press, 1995.
- Philosophy and Its History: Issues in Philosophical Historiography. Albany, NY: State University of New York Press, 1991.
- With Douglas Davis, The Metaphysics of Good and Evil According to Suárez: Disputations X and XI. Munich and Vienna: Philosophia Verlag, 1989.
- Individuality: An Essay on the Foundations of Metaphysics. Albany, NY: State University of New York Press, 1988.
- Introduction to the Problem of Individuation in the Early Middle Ages, in Analytica Series, Munich and Washington, DC: Philosophia Verlag and Catholic University of America Press, 1984.
- Suárez on Individuation. Milwaukee: Marquette University. Press 1982.

== See also ==
- American philosophy
- List of American philosophers
