= Edward A. Synan =

American philosopher and theologian (1918–1997)

- Born: Edward Aloysius Synan; 13 April 1918; Fall River, Massachusetts, US
- Died: 3 August 1997 (aged 79)

Ecclesiastical career
- Religion: Roman Catholic
- Ordained: 1942

Academic background
- Education: Seton Hall College; Catholic University of America; Pontifical Institute of Mediaeval Studies
- Doctoral advisor: Anton Charles Pegis
- Other advisor: Étienne Gilson

Academic work
- Discipline: Philosophy, theology
- Doctoral students: R. E. Houser

Edward Aloysius Synan FRSC (13 April 1918 – 3 August 1997) was a Catholic philosopher, theologian, and professor at the Pontifical Institute of Mediaeval Studies. In addition to authoring and editing several books, Synan published over eighty journal articles on subjects ranging from early patristics to late scholasticism.

== Biography ==
Synan was born in Fall River, Massachusetts, but grew up in Ridgewood, New Jersey and attended St. Luke's High School. In 1938 he graduated from Seton Hall College and entered seminary for the Roman Catholic Diocese of Newark. From there he was sent to the American College of Louvain. When the outbreak of World War II forced him to return to the United States, he resumed his study of theology at the Catholic University of America. In 1942 he received his license in sacred theology and was ordained to the priesthood.

Synan served as a chaplain for the United States Army Air Forces from 1944 to 1948. In 1948, he matriculated into the Pontifical Institute of Mediaeval Studies at the University of Toronto, where he earned his M.A. (1950), his Licentiate in Medieval Studies (1951), and his Ph.D. (1952). During this time, Synan studied under Étienne Gilson, while his thesis was directed by one of Gilson's students, Anton Charles Pegis. At Pegis's eulogy, Synan remarked, "No teacher is more truly the friend of a graduate student than is the one who insures, whether by encouragement, or by cajolery, or by severity, that the doctorate not turn into a life-time project."

Synan taught philosophy at Seton Hall University until 1959, when he was invited to return to the Pontifical Institute in Toronto. He taught history of medieval philosophy there until his death in 1997, and served as president of the Pontifical Institute from 1973 to 1979, and again from 1989 to 1990. He was elected a Fellow of the Royal Society of Canada in 1980.

He is buried at the Immaculate Conception Cemetery, Montclair, New Jersey.

== Selected works ==
- The Popes and the Jews in the Middle Ages (Macmillan, 1965) ISBN 1597400947 LCCN 65-20172
- (as editor) The Works of Richard of Campsall (Pontifical Institute of Mediaeval Studies, 1968–1982)
