= Vernon Bourke =

American philosopher (1907–1998)

Vernon Joseph Bourke (1907–1998) was a Canadian-born American Thomist philosopher and professor at Saint Louis University. His area of expertise was ethics, and especially the moral philosophy of Augustine of Hippo and Thomas Aquinas.

== Early life ==
Bourke was born in North Bay, Ontario, Canada in 1907. He attended St. Michael's College at the University of Toronto, winning the Cardinal Mercier and Governor General's medals in the philosophy honors course. He received his B.A. in 1928 and then entered the School of Graduate Studies at the University of Toronto. He was among the first to attend the Pontifical Institute of Mediaeval Studies where he worked under Etienne Gilson. He earned his M.A. in 1929 during which time he taught ancient philosophy at St. Michael's College from 1928 to 1931.

In 1931, he joined the faculty of St. Louis University as instructor of philosophy. He earned his Ph.D. in 1937 and became an assistant professor of philosophy in 1938, an associate professor in 1942, and full professor in 1946.

== Family life ==
Bourke married in 1948. He and his wife Janet (d. December 1997), were parents of two daughters and a son.

Bourke was a practicing Roman Catholic. He died on May 4, 1998.

== Academic career ==
After obtaining a PhD at the University of Toronto in Toronto, Ontario, Canada, Bourke went on to teach at Saint Louis University in Missouri from 1931 to 1975. During the 1930s he became the university's first hockey coach.

Bourke was the President of the American Catholic Philosophical Association in 1948 and an honorary member of the Order of St. Augustine. He was a member of the Natural Law Board at the University of Notre Dame and belonged to the Phi Beta Kappa fraternity.

== Published works ==
Bourke authored, co-authored, and edited numerous books and articles, including the following:

- Aquinas's Search for Wisdom
- Augustine’s Quest for Wisdom: Life and Philosophy of the Bishop of Hippo
- De Give, Michel (1966). "Augustine's View of Reality". Revue Philosophique de Louvain. 64 (82): 313–314.
- Ethics in Crisis
- Ethics: A Textbook in Moral Philosophy
- History of Ethics (2 vols.)
- Joy in St. Augustine
- St. Thomas and the Greek Moralists
- Wenin, Christian (1982). "Thomistic bibliography". Revue Philosophique de Louvain. 2 vols. (46): 303–308.
- Will in Western Thought: A Historico-Critical Survey
- Wisdom of Augustine
