= Anscombe Bioethics Centre =

Catholic academic institute in Oxford

The Anscombe Bioethics Centre was a Catholic academic institute based in Oxford, engaging in scholarship, public debate, and education. Established in 1977, it was the oldest bioethical research institution in the United Kingdom. After having had its funding cut drastically by the Catholic Bishops Conference of England and Wales, the Catholic Trust of England and Wales decided to close the Centre on 31 July 2025.

The Anscombe Centre had formerly been known as the Linacre Centre for Healthcare Ethics and was based in London at the Hospital of St John and St Elizabeth. Upon moving to Oxford in 2010, it was renamed in honour of Elizabeth Anscombe, who had died in 2001 and was notable for her contribution to moral philosophy both in relation to the understanding of intention and in relation to practical ethical issues such as contraception, abortion, and euthanasia. While alive, Anscombe had contributed to the centre, most notably drafting a key section of its 1982 report on Euthanasia and Clinical Practice.

Other academics associated with the Centre included John Finnis and John Keown, both of whom were Governors for more than a decade and both of whom contributed to multiple Centre publications (see below).

Anthony Fisher described the centre as “not just as the premier Christian bioethics institute in Britain, but as one of the finest in the world, Christian or secular”.

The Anscombe Bioethics Centre was not attached to any Institute of Higher Education but regularly collaborated with St Mary's University in Twickenham and with Blackfriars Hall in Oxford. The Centre hosted lectures, seminars, conferences and courses, often in collaboration with other institutions. It engaged with consultations by governmental and nongovernmental bodies and gave advice to healthcare professionals and others concerned about ethical issues in biomedicine. It produced reports and briefing papers and Centre staff publish books, book chapters and journal articles.

The last Director (January to July 2001 and 2010 to 2025), was Professor David Albert Jones who is also Professor of Bioethics at St Mary's University in Twickenham and research fellow at Blackfriars Oxford Its previous directors were:

- Helen Watt (2001–2010)
- Luke Gormally (1981–2000)
- David Williams (1977–1980)

Former academic staff included Teresa Iglesias (Research Fellow 1981–1985), Fred Fitzpatrick (Education and Research Officer 1984–1990), Agneta Sutton (Research Fellow 1986-1989 and Deputy Director 1989–1994), Hugh Henry (Education Officer 2003–2004), Patrick Carr (Education Officer 2005–2006), Anthony McCarthy (Research Fellow 2002–2010), Stephen Barrie (Education and Research Officer 2007–2016), Dr Michael Wee (Education and Research Officer 2016–2021), Dr Chris Wojtulewicz (Education and Research Officer 2021–), and Peter D. Williams (Media and Communications Manager 2021–2023, Media and Communications Advisor 2023–2025).

== Publications ==
- Euthanasia and Clinical Practice (1982)
- Ethics in Nursing Practice (1988)
- IVF and Justice (1990)
- Prenatal Diagnosis (1990)
- The Dependent Elderly (1992)
- Infertility and Assisted Conception (1993)
- Euthanasia, Clinical Practice and the Law (1994)
- Genetic Intervention on Human Subjects (1996)
- Issues for a Catholic Bioethic (1999)
- Life and Death in Healthcare Ethics (2000)
- Healthcare Allocation (2001)
- Culture of Life – Culture of Death (2002)
- Cooperation, Complicity and Conscience (2006)
- Incapacity and Care (2009)
- Fertility and Gender (2011)
- Human Embryo Research (2011)
- Chimera’s Children (2012)
- On the Ethics of organ transplantation (2014)
- Thinking Christian ethos (2015)
- The Moral Philosophy of Elizabeth Anscombe (2016)
- The Ethics of Pregnancy, Abortion and Childbirth (2016)
- Assisted Suicide and Euthanasia (2017)

== Notable associates of the centre ==
In addition to a small in-house staff, other academics have been associated with the centre through co-writing, co-editing, or contributing to reports or publications or through acting as governors of the centre, associate research fellows, visiting research fellows, members of the Academic Review Panel or Anscombe Memorial Lecturers. These have included (with reference to notable association though they have also collaborated in other ways):

- G. E. M. Anscombe – wrote the key section of the 1982 report on Euthanasia and Clinical Practice
- Professor David Albert Jones
- Nicanor Austriaco – visiting research fellow 2014; member of working party that produced On the ethics of organ transplantation (2014); Anscombe Memorial Lecturer (2021)
- John Berry – associate research fellow (1991–2019); contributed to Fertility and Gender (2011)
- Nigel Biggar – Academic Review Panel (2010–2012)
- Joseph Boyle – contributed to The Dependent Elderly (1992); Visiting Research Fellow (2010, 2015), Anscombe Memorial Lecturer (2015)
- Patricia Casey – Anscombe Memorial Lecturer (2018); governor (2019–present)
- Maureen L. Condic – Anscombe Memorial Lecturer (2019)
- Willem Eijk – Anscombe Memorial Lecturer (2016)
- John Finnis – Governor (1981–2007, 2010–2016); contributed to The Dependent Elderly (1992)[15], Euthanasia, Clinical Practice and the Law (1994), Issues for a Catholic Bioethic (1999)[19], Culture of Life–Culture of Death (2002), Cooperation, Complicity & Conscience (2006), Incapacity & Care (2009), and The Moral Philosophy of Elizabeth Anscombe (2016); Anscombe Memorial Lecturer (2014)
- Anthony Fisher – Oxford DPhil, supervised by John Finnis, was the basis for Healthcare Allocation 2001; contributed to Culture of Life – Culture of Death (2002) and Cooperation, Complicity and Conscience (2006)[23]; Anscombe Memorial Lecturer (2012)
- Kevin Flannery – contributed to Fertility and Gender (2011) and The Moral Philosophy of Elizabeth Anscombe (2016); Academic Review Panel (2014–2018)
- Chris Gastmans – co-edited Euthanasia and Assisted Suicide (2017) and helped organise the conference on which it was based
- Robert P. George – contributed to Culture of Life–Culture of Death (2002); Anscombe Memorial Lecturer (2011)
- John Haldane – contributed to Issues for a Catholic Bioethic (1999); Academic Review Panel (2010–2012); general editor for series in which The Moral Philosophy of Elizabeth Anscombe (2016)[5] was published; governor (2022-)
- Stephan Kampowski – visiting research fellow (2017)
- Anthony Kenny – Inaugural Anscombe Memorial Lecturer (2010)
- John Keown – governor (1990–2002); contributed to The Dependent Elderly (1992), Euthanasia, Clinical Practice and the Law (1994) and Issues for a Catholic Bioethic (1999); Visiting Research Fellow (2011); Academic Review Panel (2018–2021)
- Calum MacKellar – co-edited Chimera's Children (2012) and Euthanasia and Assisted Suicide (2017)
- Christopher McCrudden – Academic Review Panel dates (2015–2018)
- Anselm Müller – visiting research fellow and Anscombe Memorial Lecturer (2013); contributed to The Moral Philosophy of Elizabeth Anscombe (2016)
- Aidan O'Neill – Anscombe Memorial Lecturer (2021)
- David Paton – contributed to Fertility and Gender (2011), Governor (2019–2022)
- Andrew Pinsent – associate research fellow (2010–2019); contributed to Thinking Christian ethos (2015)
- Thomas Pink – governor 2007–2013; contributed to The Moral Philosophy of Elizabeth Anscombe (2016)
- O. Carter Snead – associate research fellow (2010–2019); contributed to Human Embryo Research (2011)
- Daniel Sulmasy – visiting research fellow (2012); contributed to Assisted Suicide and Euthanasia (2017)
- Roger Teichmann – co-edited The Moral Philosophy of Elizabeth Anscombe 2016 and helped organise the conference on which this was based
- Nicholas Tonti-Filippini – drafted the report On the Ethics of Organ Transplantation (2014)
- John Wyatt – Academic Review Panel (2014–2018)

== Examples of public policy engagement ==
=== House of Lords Select Committee on Medical Ethics 1993 ===
According to Keown the substantial submission of the centre, drafted by Gormally and Finnis, was said by one member of the committee to have been “the best submission the Committee received” and the subsequent report of the committee “reflected several of the key points made in the submission”.

=== House of Lords Select Committee on Stem Cell research 2001 ===
A submission by Jones as director to the House of Lords Select Committee on Stem Cell Research 2001 was co-signed by twenty-three theologians including Cahal Daley, Kallistos Ware and Rowan Williams. Though the Committee did not reference this submission, it devoted an appendix to providing an alternative account of the Christian tradition. The submission was subsequently published as a journal article and in two edited collections and was the starting point for the book The Soul of the Embryo which was described by Michael J Gorman as “perhaps the first attempt at a full history of the theological status of the embryo” and by Julia Neuberger as “a surprisingly calm look at what Christians and others have had to say”. It was shortlisted for the Michael Ramsey Prize for Theological Writing.

=== Brüstle stem cell ruling 2011 ===
Jones was author of a letter published in Nature, co-signed by an international group of 25 bioethicists, arguing that the question of whether to permit patenting of technologies derived from human embryo research “ought to be more than a question of European commercial interest”. He welcomed the subsequent decision of the European Court of Justice ruling against patentability, and later expressed the view that one positive consequence of Brexit was that it would “remove the 'malign influence' of the UK over human embryo research policy in Europe”.

=== Assisted suicide and suicide rates 2015 ===
After giving evidence Scottish Committee on Health and Sport in relation to the Assisted Suicide (Scotland) Bill and producing an evidence guide to inform debate in Westminster over Marris Bill, Jones published a paper, together with the economist David Paton, on impact of physician assisted suicide on rates of suicide. The paper concluded that legalising physician assisted suicide was associated with an increase in total suicides (inclusive if assisted suicide) of 6.3%, a result that was statistically significant after controlling for confounding factors and state and year effects. The paper was quoted in the debate in Germany over a law to restrict organised forms of assisted suicide and was also quoted in the context of the debate over voluntary assisted dying in New Zealand and in Western Australia. The paper has been subject to scholarly criticism to which Jones has responded.

== Criticism of the Centre ==
The utilitarian bioethicist John Harris in a highly critical review of the Linacre publication Ethics in Nursing Practice coined the term ‘linacracy’ for its approach: “If theodicy consists in justifying the ways of God to man, 'linacracy' is justifying the ways of Catholics to each other... [this book shows] once and for all the wickedness to which Catholic philosophy can lead”.

John Walton, who chaired the 1993 House of Lords Select Committee on Medical Ethics, found the centre's work on euthanasia to be “useful” but also “biased”: “Although this book is so closely argued that it is not recommended for light bedside reading, it repays careful study and represents a useful, if biased, contribution to a topical and highly emotive subject”. Similarly, MacKenna Roberts of Progress Educational Trust, found the approach taken by speakers at a conference on human embryo research hosted by the Anscombe Centre to be “uncompromising”. However, in contrast to Walton, while she registered her “disagreements”, she did not perceive the perspectives she disagreed with to be expressions of bias: “Catholic perspectives on the human embryo may be infamously uncompromising, but the intelligent and thought-provoking presentations at this conference allayed my concerns of bias, and demonstrated how taking account of the Catholic view can enrich and inform public debate and policy”.
