= Mary T. Clark =

American Catholic nun, philosopher, and civil rights advocate

Mary Twibill Clark RSCJ (October 23, 1913 – September 1, 2014) was an American Roman Catholic nun, academic, and civil rights advocate. She was best known as a scholar of the history of philosophy, and was associated especially with Saint Augustine.

== Life ==
Born in Philadelphia, Pennsylvania, to Francis S. and Regina Holland (née Twibill) Clark, Mary Clark entered the Society of the Sacred Heart on June 5, 1939 after graduating Manhattanville College. Much of her life was subsequently spent at the college where she taught philosophy. A Chair of Christian Philosophy at the college, from which she retired in 2011, bears her name.

She served as the President of the American Catholic Philosophical Association in 1977, of the Metaphysical Society of America, and of the Society for Medieval and Renaissance Philosophy. Clark served on the executive committee of the Eastern Division of the American Philosophical Association, and towards the end of her life as a visiting academic at Ralston College.

Clark was among the original Editorial Advisors of the scholarly journal Dionysius, to which she contributed a discussion of the relevance of Augustine's theology of the Trinity, and was in addition a member of the Board of Editorial Consultants of the Personalist Forum.

Over the years, she also taught as a visiting professor at San Francisco, Fordham, Villanova, Fairfield, and Marquette universities. During the 1960s she led the Social Action Secretariat of the National Federation of Catholic College Students, which "initiated action, created literature, and hosted events during the civil rights era".

== Works ==
Her books include:

- Augustine
- An Aquinas Reader
- Augustine: Philosopher of Freedom (with Vernon J. Bourke)
- Logic: a Practical Approach (with Helen Casey)
- Augustinian Personalism
- Discrimination Today: Guidelines for Civic Action
- Augustine of Hippo: Selected Writings
- The Problem of Freedom.

She also contributed a chapter on Augustine's De Trinitate to The Cambridge Companion to Augustine and translated the Theological Treatises on the Trinity of Marius Victorinus.

== Death ==
Sister Mary Clark died on September 1, 2014, aged 100. She was predeceased by her siblings, Rev. James D. Clark, George A. Clark, and Regina (Mrs. James P.) McGraney.
