= Edward Synan =

Edward Synan may refer to:

- Edward A. Synan (1918–1997), American philosopher and theologian
- Edward John Synan (1820–1887), Irish politician
