= Proceedings of the American Catholic Philosophical Association =

- Discipline: Philosophy
- Language: English
- Edited by: R. Edward Houser, Thomas M. Osborne

Publication details
- Former name: Proceedings of the Annual Meeting of the American Catholic Philosophical Association
- History: 1926–present
- Publisher: Philosophy Documentation Center (United States)
- Frequency: Annual

Standard abbreviations
- ISO 4: Proc. Am. Cathol. Philos. Assoc.

Indexing
- ISSN: 0065-7638 (print); 2153-7925 (web)
- LCCN: 87-655829
- OCLC no.: 6029215

Links
- Journal homepage; Online access

The Proceedings of the American Catholic Philosophical Association is an annual series containing papers presented at the meetings of the American Catholic Philosophical Association. Each year the association sponsors a conference organized around a particular philosophical topic and all papers presented at the main sessions (as opposed to satellite sessions) are published the following year in the Proceedings. Each volume is an edited anthology and the secretary of the association serves as editor-in-chief. All papers presented at the conference are subject to peer review, although the acceptance rate varies depending on the number of papers submitted. The series is published on behalf of the association by the Philosophy Documentation Center.

== Abstracting and indexing ==
The Proceedings are abstracted and indexed in:

- Academic Search
- L'Année philologique
- Catholic Periodical and Literature Index
- Expanded Academic ASAP
- Humanities International Index
- Index Philosophicus
- InfoTrac OneFile
- Index to Social Science & Humanities Proceedings
- International Bibliography of Periodical Literature
- International Philosophical Bibliography
- MEDLINE
- The Philosopher's Index
- Philosophy Research Index
- PhilPapers
- Religious and Theological Abstracts
- Russian Academy of Sciences Bibliographies

== See also ==
- List of philosophy journals
