= American Catholic Philosophical Quarterly =

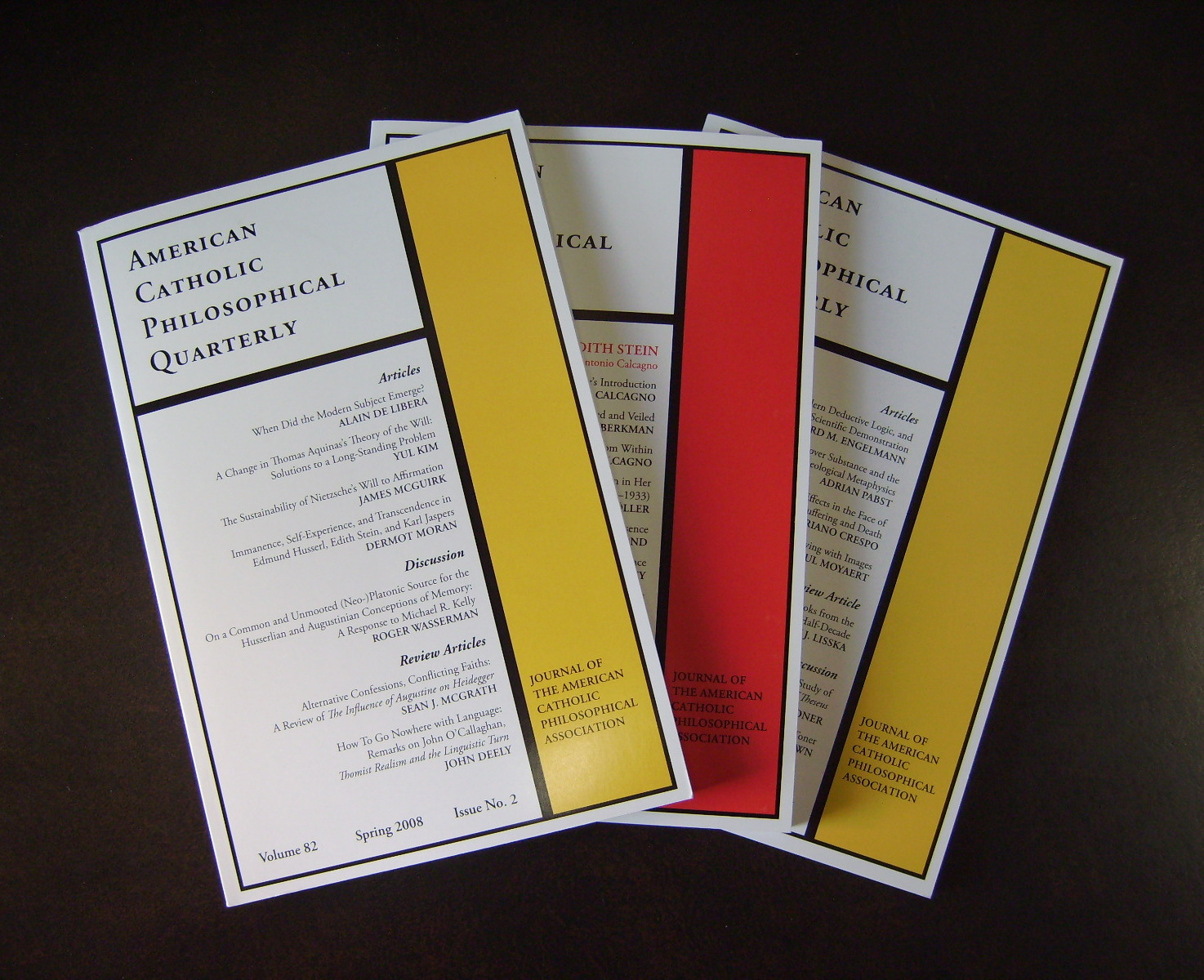
- Sample Issues of the American Catholic Philosophical Quarterly
- Discipline: Philosophy
- Language: English
- Edited by: David Clemenson

Publication details
- Former name: The New Scholasticism
- History: 1990–present; 1927–1989 as The New Scholasticism
- Publisher: Philosophy Documentation Center for the American Catholic Philosophical Association (United States)
- Frequency: Quarterly

Standard abbreviations
- ISO 4: Am. Cathol. Philos. Q.

Indexing
- ISSN: 1051-3558 (print); 2153-8441 (web)
- LCCN: 90-641105
- OCLC no.: 21936453

Links
- Journal homepage; Tables of content, 1990–present; Tables of content, 1927–1989

The American Catholic Philosophical Quarterly is a peer-reviewed academic journal sponsored by the American Catholic Philosophical Association. It was founded in 1927 as The New Scholasticism and adopted its current title in 1990. The journal publishes articles and book reviews covering the entire range and history of Western philosophical thought. Contributions on non-Western philosophy are also published, especially if they shed light upon issues in the Western tradition. The journal is not committed to any particular school of philosophy and contributions variously employ analytical, phenomenological, Thomistic, historical, and other methods. Nevertheless, it typically prefers contributions on topics or thinkers that are of special interest to Catholic thought. Thus, almost every issue usually carries at least one article on Thomas Aquinas. Pieces on medieval thought are well represented as well, as are essays in the philosophy of religion and philosophical theology.

Every fourth issue of the journal is devoted to a philosopher, Catholic or not, who has exercised a significant influence on Western philosophy. Recent special issues have been devoted to Max Scheler, Johannes Scotus Eriugena, Gabriel Marcel, Peter Abelard, and Edith Stein.

The editorial offices are currently located at the University of St. Thomas, Minnesota. The journal's editor is David L. Clemenson.

== Indexing ==
The journal is indexed in Academic Search, L'Année philologique, Article@INIST, ArticleFirst, Arts & Humanities Citation Index, ATLA Religion Database, Catholic Periodical and Literature Index, Current Abstracts, Current Contents / Arts & Humanities, Expanded Academic ASAP, Factiva, FRANCIS, Humanities International Index, Index Philosophicus, InfoTrac OneFile, International Bibliography of Book Reviews of Scholarly Literature (IBR), International Bibliography of Periodical Literature (IBZ), International Philosophical Bibliography, Periodicals Index Online, The Philosopher's Index, Philosophy Research Index, PhilPapers, Religious and Theological Abstracts, Russian Academy of Sciences Bibliographies, TOC Premier, and Wilson OmniFile.

== See also ==
- List of philosophy journals
