= Justin Long =

American actor and comedian (born 1978)

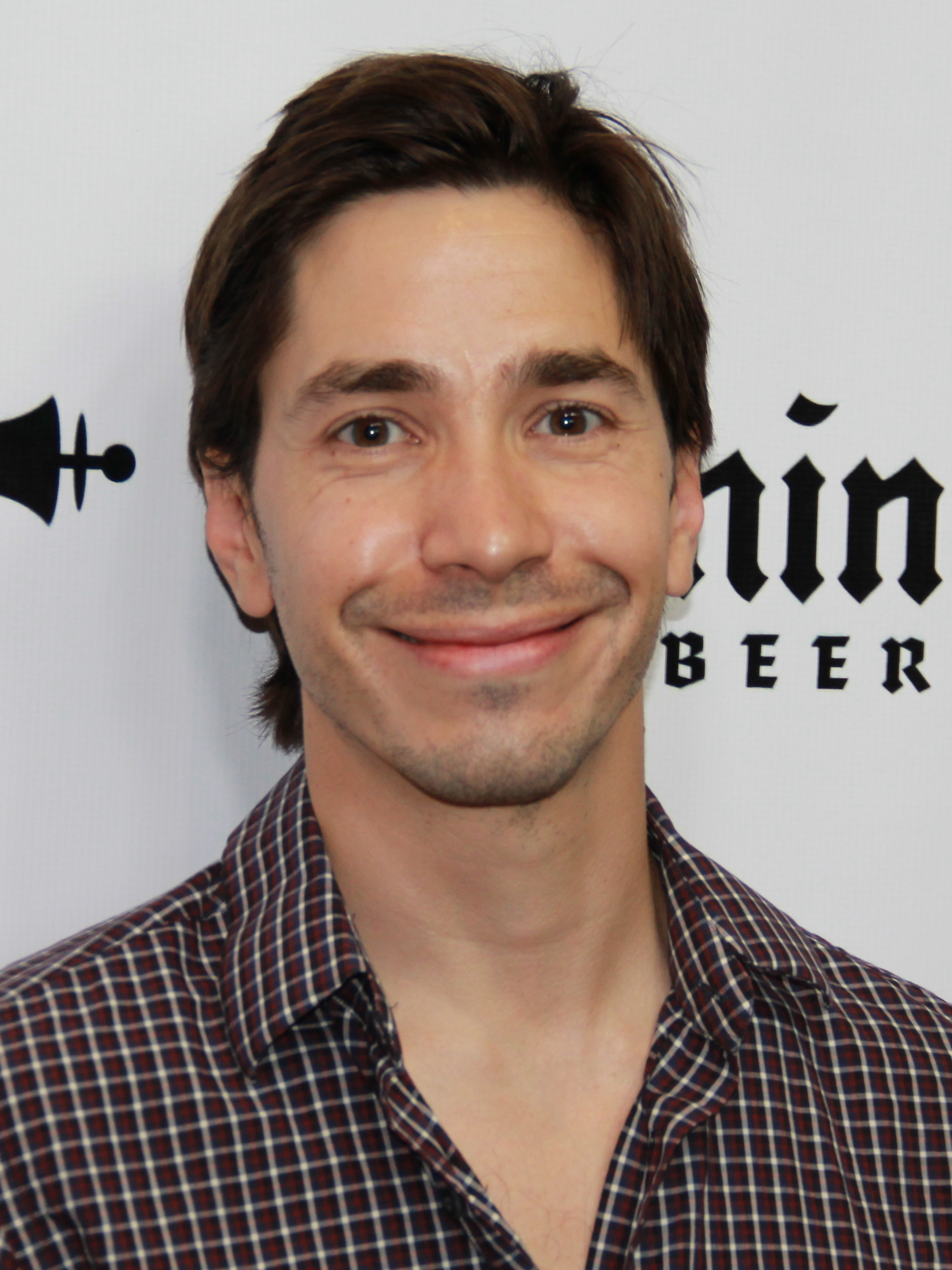
- Long in 2014
- Born: Justin Jacob Long; June 2, 1978 (age 48); Fairfield, Connecticut, U.S.
- Education: Vassar College
- Occupations: Actor; comedian; writer; producer
- Years active: 1999–present
- Spouse: Kate Bosworth (m. 2023)
- Children: 1
- Father: R. James Long

Justin Jacob Long (born June 2, 1978) is an American actor, comedian, writer, and producer. Long is known for his film roles, particularly in comedy and horror films. For his work in horror cinema, he has come to be recognized as a scream king. He notably appears in the films Galaxy Quest (1999), Jeepers Creepers (2001), Dodgeball (2004), Herbie: Fully Loaded (2005), Accepted (2006), Idiocracy (2006), Dreamland (2006), Live Free or Die Hard (2007), Zack and Miri Make a Porno (2008), Drag Me to Hell (2009), He's Just Not That Into You (2009), Alpha and Omega (2010), Best Man Down (2013), Tusk (2014), The Wave (2019), Barbarian (2022), and Weapons (2025), as well as voicing Alvin Seville in the live-action Alvin and the Chipmunks film series.

He is also known for his television appearances as Warren Cheswick in the NBC comedy-drama series Ed (2000–2004), Kevin Murphy in the Netflix original animated sitcom F Is for Family (2015–2021), and Nathan Bratt in the Disney+ series Goosebumps (2023), for which he was nominated for the Children's and Family Emmy Award for Outstanding Lead Performer. He appeared with John Hodgman in TV commercials for Apple's "Get a Mac" campaign (2006–2009), and as himself in Intel's "Go PC" campaign.

== Early life ==
Justin Jacob Long was born on June 2, 1978, the second of three boys in Fairfield, Connecticut, to R. James Long, a philosophy and Latin professor at Fairfield University, and Wendy Lesniak, a former actress who has mostly appeared on stage. His paternal grandmother was of Sicilian descent. Long had a "kind of conservative" Catholic upbringing.

His older brother, Damian, is a local stage actor and teacher at Weston High School in Weston, Connecticut. His younger brother, Christian, is also an actor as well as a director. Long attended Fairfield College Preparatory School, a Jesuit institution, and Vassar College, where he was a member of the sketch comedy group Laughingstock and starred in several plays, including Butterflies Are Free.

== Career ==
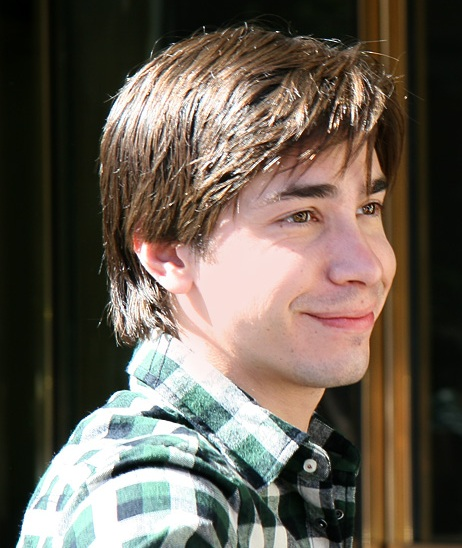
Long at the 2007 Toronto International Film Festival

Long's film credits include Galaxy Quest (1999), Jeepers Creepers (2001), Crossroads (2002), DodgeBall: A True Underdog Story (2004), Herbie: Fully Loaded (2005), Waiting... (2005), Dreamland (2006), The Break-Up (2006), and Idiocracy (2006). He was also a regular on the NBC TV series Ed (2000–04) as socially awkward Warren P. Cheswick. He was offered the opportunity to replace Steve Burns on Blue's Clues after he left the show, but ultimately declined. He was the voice of Alvin Seville in Alvin and the Chipmunks (2007), Alvin and the Chipmunks: The Squeakquel (2009), Alvin and the Chipmunks: Chipwrecked (2011), and Alvin and the Chipmunks: The Road Chip (2015). He also played the main character in the comedy film Accepted (2006).

Long made a guest appearance in the documentary, Wild West Comedy Show (2006). In 2007, he co-starred with Bruce Willis as a white-hat hacker in Live Free or Die Hard and had a role in the comedy The Sasquatch Gang. Long is known for his depiction of a Mac in Apple's "Get a Mac" campaign (2006–2009). The campaign featured commercials in which Long as a Mac and John Hodgman as a PC engaged in playful banter about "the strengths of the Mac platform and weaknesses of the PC platform." He also appeared as himself in Intel's "Go PC" campaign.

Long also had a small role in the comedy film Zack and Miri Make a Porno (2008) as Brandon St. Randy, a gay porn star. In 2009, he starred in He's Just Not That into You with co-star Ginnifer Goodwin, Drag Me to Hell with Alison Lohman, and After.Life opposite Liam Neeson and Christina Ricci. He also provided the voice of Humphrey in Alpha and Omega (2010), starring with Hayden Panettiere. Also in 2010, he starred in the comedy film Going the Distance with Drew Barrymore. He was cast as a one-armed Civil War veteran in Robert Redford's The Conspirator (2011).

Long recorded the audiobook version of Judy Blume's Then Again, Maybe I Won't and Stephen King's Everything's Eventual. From July 7–18, 2010, he appeared in a production of Samuel J. and K. at the Williamstown Theatre Festival. On August 16, 2010, he co-hosted WWE Raw with Going the Distance co-stars Charlie Day and Jason Sudeikis at the Staples Center in Los Angeles. In 2013, he starred in the comedy drama Best Man Down. In 2014, he starred in the independent love drama Comet, which he and his co-star, Emmy Rossum, also produced. That same year, he starred in the Kevin Smith body horror-dark comedy film Tusk, about a man's lifelong fascination with walruses and extreme, fetishized body modification and cosmetic surgery. Also in 2014, Long appeared in a few skits on Inside Amy Schumer. In April 2019, he started the podcast Life Is Short with Justin Long; its introductory episode aired through Wondery on May 13, 2019. His first guest was actor Neil Patrick Harris.

On June 24, 2019, Long, along with an ensemble cast, presented The Investigation: A Search for the Truth in Ten Acts, a dramatic reading of Special Counsel Robert S. Mueller III's Report on the Investigation into Russian Interference in the 2016 Presidential Election. Long portrayed former Director of the Federal Bureau of Investigation James Comey. In 2020, he appeared in the reality television series Celebrity Watch Party alongside his younger brother Christian Long. He appeared in commercials for Intel's "Go PC" campaign.

Long's recent film appearances include The Wave (2019), Barbarian (2022), and Weapons (2025). His television appearances include Kevin Murphy in the Netflix original animated sitcom F Is for Family (2015–2021), and Nathan Bratt in the Disney+ series Goosebumps (2023), for which he was nominated for the Children's and Family Emmy Award for Outstanding Lead Performer. In July 2024, he was confirmed to direct and write a segment for V/H/S/Beyond, which was released exclusively on Shudder on October 4, 2024.

== Personal life ==
Long had a relationship with Drew Barrymore that was on and off between 2007 and 2010. He also dated Amanda Seyfried from 2013 to 2015.

During an episode of the podcast Armchair Expert with Dax Shepard, Long revealed that he was the victim of a drugging and abduction during the filming of Youth In Revolt while in Michigan. According to Long, after an evening of drinking, he left with several local people who offered him marijuana that he believed was actually phencyclidine, more commonly known as PCP. After getting him severely intoxicated, these people took him to various locations against his will and refused to return him to his hotel. According to Long, they made reference to filming him while high on hard drugs and selling the footage to TMZ or another website dedicated to celebrity gossip. Long was so concerned that he eventually escaped by leaping from the moving vehicle. He said he has faced lingering nerve damage in his leg due to the injuries he sustained in the escape.

In January 2022, it was reported that Long was dating actress Kate Bosworth. In April 2023, the couple announced their engagement. During an episode of his Life is Short podcast in May 2023, Long referred to Bosworth as his "now-wife." On July 18, 2025, Long and Bosworth welcomed their first child, a daughter.

== Political views ==
Long is a Democrat. He supported Barack Obama during the 2012 U.S. presidential election and was an outspoken critic of the Republican nominee Mitt Romney, describing him as a "modern-day Gordon Gekko". Long endorsed Senator Bernie Sanders for President in the 2016 U.S. presidential election. He endorsed Sanders again in the 2020 Democratic primary, has been seen at Sanders rallies, and has appeared on the campaign trail as a surrogate.

== Filmography ==
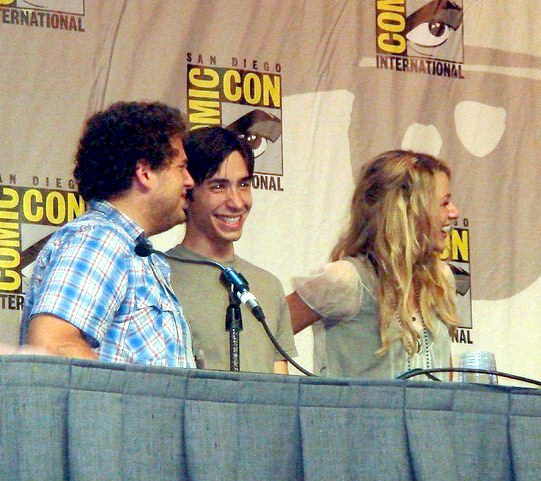
Left to right: Jonah Hill, Long, and Blake Lively promoting Accepted at Comic-Con 2006

=== Film ===
Year	Title	Role	Notes
1999	Galaxy Quest	Brandon	
2001	Happy Campers	Donald	
2001	Jeepers Creepers	Darius "Darry" Jenner	
2002	Crossroads	Henry	
2003	Jeepers Creepers 2	Darry Jenner	Cameo
2004	Raising Genius	Hal Nestor	
2004	Hair High	Dwayne	Voice
2004	DodgeBall: A True Underdog Story	Justin Redman	
2004	Wake Up, Ron Burgundy: The Lost Movie	Chris Harken	Direct-to-DVD
2005	Robin's Big Date	Robin	Short film
2005	Herbie: Fully Loaded	Kevin	
2005	Waiting...	Dean Saunders	
2006	The Sasquatch Gang	Zerk Wilder	
2006	Dreamland	Mookie	
2006	The Break-Up	Christopher Hirons	
2006	Accepted	Bartleby "B" Gaines	
2006	Idiocracy	Dr. Lexus	
2007	Live Free or Die Hard	Matthew "Matt" Farrell	
2007	Battle for Terra	Senn	Voice
2007	Alvin and the Chipmunks	Alvin Seville	Voice
2007	Walk Hard: The Dewey Cox Story	George Harrison	Uncredited
2008	Strange Wilderness	Junior	
2008	Just Add Water	Spoonie	
2008	Zack and Miri Make a Porno	Brandon St. Randy	
2008	Pineapple Express	Justin	Deleted scene
2009	He's Just Not That Into You	Alex	
2009	Still Waiting...	Dean Saunders	Uncredited
2009	Taking Chances	Chase Revere	
2009	Serious Moonlight	Todd	
2009	Drag Me to Hell	Clay Dalton	
2009	Funny People	Re-Do Guy	Cameo
2009	Beyond All Boundaries	Corp. James R. Garrett / Sgt. John H. Morris	Voice, short film
2009	Planet 51	Lem Kerplog / Rover	Voice
2009	Old Dogs	Troop Leader Adam Devlin	Uncredited
2009	After.Life	Paul Coleman	
2009	Alvin and the Chipmunks: The Squeakquel	Alvin Seville	Voice
2010	Youth in Revolt	Paul Saunders	
2010	Going the Distance	Garrett Scully	
2010	Alpha and Omega	Humphrey	Voice
2011	The Conspirator	Nicholas Baker	
2011	10 Years	Marty Burn	
2011	Free Hugs	Checkout Boy	Short film
2011	Alvin and the Chipmunks: Chipwrecked	Alvin Seville	Voice
2012	For a Good Time, Call...	Jesse	
2012	Best Man Down	Scott	
2013	Movie 43	Robin	Segment: "Super Hero Speed Dating"
2013	iSteve	Steve Jobs	
2013	A Case of You	Sam	Also producer and writer
2013	Walking with Dinosaurs	Patchi	Voice
2014	Ask Me Anything	Dan Gallo	
2014	Veronica Mars	Drunken Wingman	Uncredited
2014	Comet	Dell	Also executive producer
2014	Tusk	Wallace Bryton	
2014	The Lookalike	Holt Mulligan	Also producer
2015	Alvin and the Chipmunks: The Road Chip	Alvin Seville	Voice
2016	Yoga Hosers	Yogi Bayer	
2016	Frank & Lola	Keith Winkleman	
2016	Lavender	Liam	
2016	Ghost Team	Ross	
2016	Trump Baby	Baby	Voice, short film
2017	And Then I Go	Tim Hanratty	
2017	Literally, Right Before Aaron	Adam Schulz	
2019	Jay and Silent Bob Reboot	Brandon St. Randy	
2019	After Class	Josh Cohn	
2019	The Wave	Frank	
2019	Tall Tales from the Magical Garden of Antoon Krings	Apollo Cricket	Voice, English dub
2021	Lady of the Manor	Max Cameron	Also writer, director and producer; directorial debut
2022	House of Darkness	Hapgood "Hap" Jackson	
2022	Barbarian	AJ Gilbride	
2022	Christmas with the Campbells	David	
2022	Clerks III	Orderly	
2023	Dear David	Bryce	
2023	It's a Wonderful Knife	Henry Waters	
2024	The 4:30 Movie	Stank	
2024	V/H/S/Beyond		Co-writer/co-director of segment "Fur Babies"
2024	Spin the Bottle	Sheriff Stanton	
2025	Weapons	Gary	Cameo
2025	Night Patrol	Ethan Hawkins	
2025	Coyotes	Scott	
2026	In Memoriam	Jack Stackhouse	
2027	Lice †	Principal Van	Post-production
TBA	You Deserve Each Other †	Austin Frazier	Post-production
TBA	Best Pancakes in the County †	TBA	Filming
TBA	Grave Encounters †	TBA	In production
TBA	Stung †	Derek	Post-production

=== Television ===
Year	Title	Role	Notes
2000–2004	Ed	Warren P. Cheswick	71 episodes
2005	Punk'd	Himself	Episode dated: "December 11, 2005"
2006	Campus Ladies	Connor	Episode: "Fraternity Row"
2006	That '70s Show	Andrew Davis	Episode: "Love of My Life"
2006–2007	King of the Hill	Various voices	3 episodes
2009	Saturday Night Live	Matthew McConaughey	Episode: "Drew Barrymore/Regina Spektor"
2011–2012, 2015	New Girl	Paul Genzlinger	5 episodes
2012	Unsupervised	Gary	Voice, 13 episodes
2013	Mom	Adam	3 episodes
2014	Sober Companion		Pilot
2014	The Michael J. Fox Show	Zack	Episode: "Changes"
2014	TripTank	Camera Man / Andrew	Voice, 2 episodes
2015	Portlandia	Justin	Episode: "The Fiancée"
2015	Inside Amy Schumer	Brian	Episode: "Fight Like a Girl"
2015–2018	Drunk History	Arno Allan Penzias / Elmer McCurdy	2 episodes
2015–2021	F Is for Family	Kevin Murphy	Voice, 35 episodes
2016	Dream Team	Marty Schumacher	Pilot
2016–2018	Skylanders Academy	Spyro	Voice, main role
2017	Do You Want to See a Dead Body?	Himself	Episode: "A Body and an Actor"
2018	The Conners	Neil	2 episodes
2019	The Investigation: A Search for the Truth in Ten Acts	Himself, James Comey	live reading/performance
2019	Giri/Haji	Ellis Vickers	4 episodes
2020	Shop Class	Himself	Host
2021	Creepshow	Simon Sherman	Season 2 Episode 5 / Night of the Living Late Show
2021	Masters of the Universe: Revelation	Roboto	Voice
2023	Goosebumps	Nathan Bratt	Main role (season 1)
2023	The Christmas Break	Jack Bradford	Television film
2025	The Neighborhood	Bruce	Episode: "Welcome to Venice"
2026	Impractical Jokers	Himself	Episode: "Subscribe to Service"
2026	Rick and Morty	Hyena #3	Episode: "MortGully: The Last Rickforest"

=== Music videos ===
Year	Title	Artist(s)	Ref.
2026	"Hate That I Made You Love Me"	Ariana Grande	

== Awards and nominations ==
Year	Award	Category	Nominated work	Result
2000	Saturn Awards	Best Performance by a Younger Actor	Galaxy Quest	Nominated
2002	Saturn Awards	Best Performance by a Younger Actor	Jeepers Creepers	Nominated
2005	MTV Movie & TV Awards	Best On-Screen Team	Dodgeball (shared with the cast)	Nominated
2007	Teen Choice Awards	Choice Breakout Movie Actor	Accepted, The Break-Up, Live Free or Die Hard, and Idiocracy	Nominated
2008	Saturn Awards	Best Supporting Actor	Live Free or Die Hard	Nominated
2009	Scream Awards	Best Horror Actor	Drag Me to Hell	Nominated
2012	Critics' Choice Television Awards	Best Guest Performer in a Comedy Series	New Girl	Nominated
2016	Kids' Choice Awards	Favorite Voice from an Animated Movie	Alvin and the Chipmunks: The Road Chip	Nominated
2023	MTV Movie & TV Awards	Most Frightened Performance	Barbarian	Nominated
2023	Fangoria Chainsaw Awards	Best Supporting Performance	Barbarian	Nominated
2023	Critics' Choice Super Awards	Best Actor in a Horror Movie	Barbarian	Nominated
2024	Kids' Choice Awards	Favorite Male TV Star – Family	Goosebumps	Nominated
2025	Children's and Family Emmy Awards	Outstanding Lead Performer	Goosebumps	Nominated
