= Jonardon Ganeri =

Philosopher

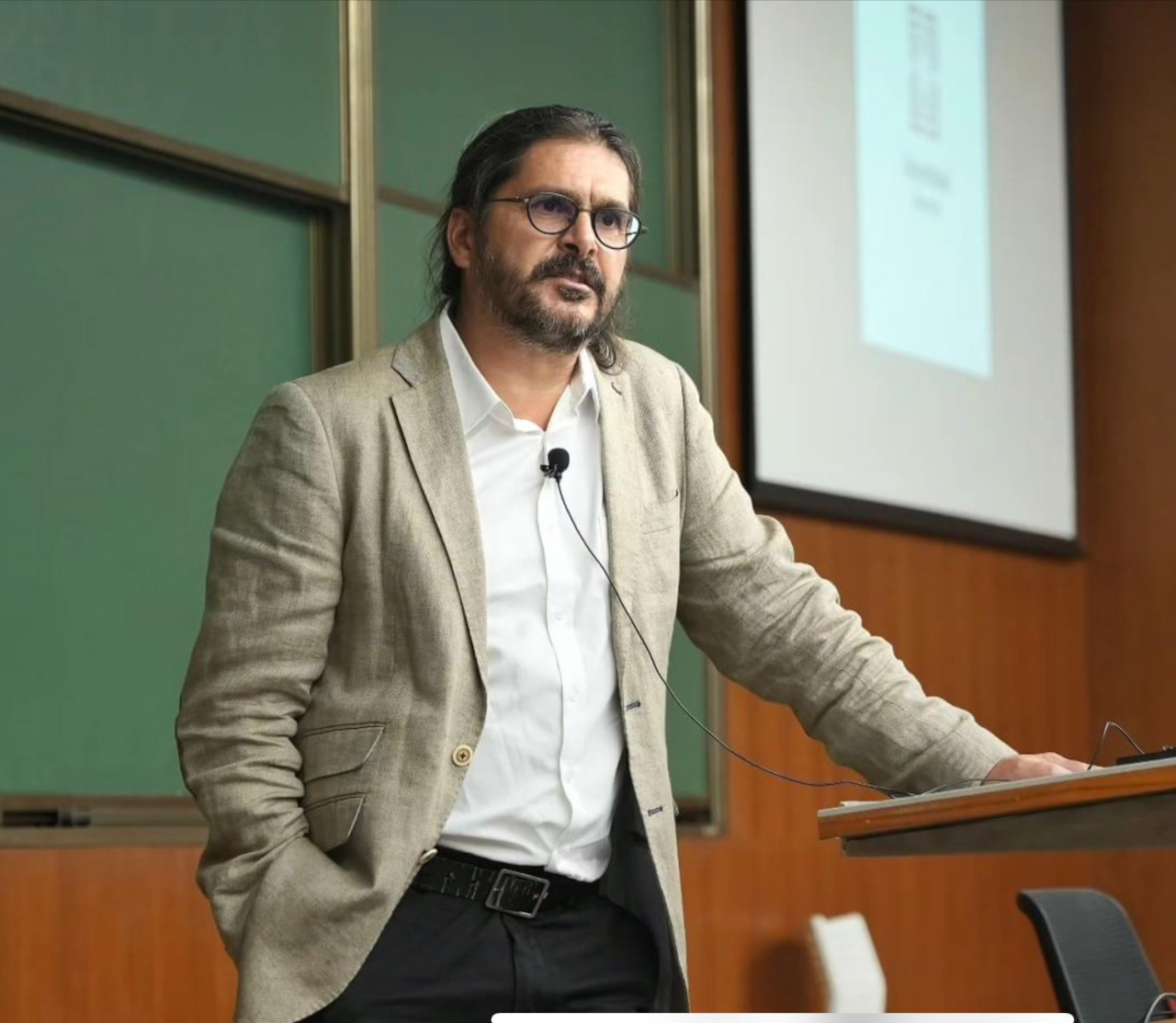
Jonardon Ganeri

Jonardon Ganeri FBA is a philosopher of Indian and British origin specializing in the philosophy of mind and in South Asian and Buddhist philosophical traditions. Ganeri currently holds the Bimal K. Matilal Distinguished Professorship in Philosophy at the University of Toronto. He was a Global Network Professor in the College of Arts and Sciences, New York University, having previously taught at several universities in Britain. Ganeri graduated from Churchill College, Cambridge, with an undergraduate and M.Math. degrees in mathematics, before completing a D.Phil. in philosophy at University and Wolfson Colleges, Oxford University.

Ganeri has published twelve research monographs and over eighty research papers. He is the editor of the Oxford Handbook of Indian Philosophy and is on the editorial board of the Stanford Encyclopedia of Philosophy, the British Journal for the History of Philosophy, Philosophy East & West, Analysis, and other journals and monograph series. His research interests are in consciousness, self, attention, the epistemology of inquiry, philosophical logic, the idea of philosophy as a practice and its relationship with literature. He works on the philosophy of mind, the nature of subjectivity, Buddhist philosophy, Indian logic and philosophy of language, epistemology, and the history of Indian philosophical traditions.

== Philosophical work ==
Jonardon Ganeri is a prominent advocate for an expanded role for cross-cultural methodologies in philosophical research, and for enhanced cultural diversity in the philosophical curriculum. He is known for promoting the idea of "cosmopolitan philosophy" as a new discipline within philosophy, and for the importance of what he calls "threshold thinking." According to Ganeri, the cosmopolitan philosopher thinks with past historical figures, and not just about them, and so belongs to a new band of philosophers who think deeply and creatively with historical texts, without being trapped by parochial, often Anglophone, presuppositions. They do not permit exegesis to crowd out doing philosophy, and so to postpone indefinitely the hard work of thinking philosophically with the material. Arindam Chakrabarti has expressed the idea as being that “instead of preserving, quoting, and juxtaposing [one’s sources], one picks up a concept, a line of reasoning or some, however minor, point arising out of years of imaginative rearrangement and cross-fertilisation of the ideas retrieved from different cultures, periods, texts, and disciplines.”

In the philosophy of mind, Ganeri has pursued a research programme in a trilogy of books over two decades. Ganeri argues, in The Self: Naturalism, Consciousness, and the First-Person Stance, that if we are to avoid Cartesianism in the philosophy of mind then we must be able to demonstrate, in the framework of a liberal naturalism, how subjects of experience come to be part of the natural world, and, in particular, how subjectivity and selfhood emerge from our most fundamental psychological operations. He uses Nyāya, Cārvāka and Buddhist materials to develop the argument.

In Attention, Not Self he does this by defending the explanatory priority of attention, the “not self” of the title being a nod towards Abhidharma Buddhist materials, and a denial of the priority of selves over attention, but not a denial of the existence of selves. Instead, the goal is to present a new "attention-first" philosophy of mind. The book is a detailed examination of the Theravāda Buddhism of Buddhaghosa.

The third work in the trilogy is Seeing and Subjectivity. In the book, Ganeri aims to bring perception to the foreground—perceptual attention and perceptual experience—and the relationships these concepts have with subjectivity and selfhood. Drawing in part on Indian theories about the nature of perceptual consciousness, and in part on insights into aesthetic subjectivity from Sanskrit aesthetics, the book provides a new theory of the role of the subjective in experience. The interlocking interrelationships between the concepts of attention, imagination, perception, subjectivity and selfhood, in an anti-Cartesian and anti-physicalist, but still naturalistic, cosmopolitan philosophy of mind, is the running theme in this project.

In the history of philosophy, Ganeri argues that modernity is not a uniquely European achievement. In The Lost Age of Reason, he shows how there emerges in 17th century India a distinctive version of modernity in the work of the so-called “new reason” (Navya-nyāya) philosophers of Bengal, Mithilā, and Benares. These thinkers confronted the past and thought of themselves as doing something very new, as intellectual innovators. The innovations of this group of philosophers is also the subject of his earlier book, Semantic Powers, revised and restructured for the second edition entitled Artha, which aims to demonstrate that they made discoveries in linguistics and the philosophy of language which were not seen in Europe until the late 20th century. These include discoveries about the meaning of proper names, pronominal anaphora, testimony, and the relationship between epistemology and meaning theory.

In metaphysics, Ganeri is the rediscoverer of transformational emergence. He was the first person to propose that Buddhist dharmas are tropes.

Ganeri has written two popular introductory textbooks for Indian philosophy. His Philosophy in Classical India: The Proper Work of Reason defends the central importance of rationality in the Indian tradition, and is aimed at philosophy students and faculty. His Classical Indian Philosophy, co-authored with Peter Adamson, is accompanied by a podcast series.

Ganeri has also written about the philosophy of the Portuguese poet Fernando Pessoa. His book, Virtual Subjects, Fugitive Selves, is the first English language monograph about Pessoa's philosophy written by a philosopher. Ganeri argues that Pessoa's notion of the heteronym can be used to solve some of the trickiest puzzles in the global history of the philosophy of self. His second book about Pessoa, Fernando Pessoa: Imagination and the Self, locates the notion of heteronymy in many sources in classical Indian philosophy. It focuses on the importance of the imagination in simulating subjectivity and the senses of self. The metaphors and images through which subjectivity and inwardness have been understood around the world is explored in Ganeri's popular book Inwardness: An Outsiders' Guide, which is itself an example of the method of cosmopolitan philosophy.

== Honours and awards ==
In 2015, Jonardon Ganeri was elected a Fellow of the British Academy (FBA), the United Kingdom's national academy for the humanities and social sciences. Also in 2015, Ganeri won the Infosys Prize in the category of humanities, the first philosopher to do so.

Ganeri delivered the 2009 Pranab. K. Sen Memorial Lecture at Jadavpur University, Kolkata, the 2016 Brian O'Neil Memorial Lectures at the University of New Mexico, and the 2017 Daya Krishna Memorial Lecture at the University of Rajasthan, the 2022 Lindner Lecture in Ethics at the College of Wooster, and the 2024 S. K. Bose Lecture at St. Stephens College, Delhi.

In 2019, Ganeri delivered a convocation address at Ashoka University, Delhi.

Ganeri gave the 2024 John Locke Lectures at the University of Oxford.

== Education ==
Jonardon Ganeri studied Mathematics at the University of Cambridge, where he was awarded the B.A. (Hons) and an M.Math. (Tripos Part III).

Ganeri studied Philosophy first at King's College London and then at the University of Oxford, writing his D.Phil under the supervision of Bimal Krishna Matilal.

== Writings ==
=== Books ===
- Seeing and Subjectivity (Oxford University Press, 2026).
- Fernando Pessoa: Imagination and the Self (Oxford University Press, 2024).
- Inwardness: An Outsider's Guide (Columbia University Press, 2021).
- Virtual Subjects, Fugitive Selves: Fernando Pessoa and his Philosophy (Oxford University Press, 2021).
- Classical Indian Philosophy (Oxford University Press, 2021), co-authored with Peter Adamson
- Attention, Not Self (Oxford University Press, 2017/2020).
- (ed) The Oxford Handbook of Indian Philosophy (Oxford University Press, 2017/2021).
- The Self: Naturalism, Consciousness and the First-Person Stance (Oxford University Press, 2012/2015).
- The Lost Age of Reason: Philosophy in Early Modern India 1450–1700 (Oxford University Press, 2011/2014).
- The Concealed Art of the Soul: Theories of Self and Practices of Truth in Indian Ethics and Epistemology (Oxford University Press, 2007).
- Artha: Testimony and the Theory of Meaning in Indian Philosophical Analysis (Oxford University Press, 2006).
- Philosophy in Classical India: The Proper Work of Reason (Routledge, 2001). Expanded Second Edition 2027.
- Semantic Powers (Oxford University Press, 1999).

=== Essays ===
Many of these essays are available here.

- “Blueprint for cosmopolitan philosophy: A post-Eurocentric proposal,” British Journal for the History of Philosophy (2026) 34.
- “Interjacent intellectuals,” Philosophy East & West (2025) 75.1: 56–76.
- “Is it possible to imagine being no one?” Journal of Consciousness Studies (2024) 31.5–6: 221–34.
- “An irrealist theory of race,” Critical Philosophy of Race (2024) 12.1: 106-125.
- “Fernando Pessoa: the poet as philosopher,” Royal Institute of Philosophy Supplements (2023) 93: 193-208.
- “Cosmic consciousness,” The Monist (2022) 105: 43–57.
- “What is cosmopsychism?” The Monist (2022) 105: 1–5. With Itay Shani.
- “Selfless receptivity: Attention as an epistemic virtue,” Oxford Studies in Epistemology 7 (2022): 1–14, with Nicolas Bommarito.
- “Is this me? A story about personal identity from the Mahāprajñāpāramitopadeśa/ Dà zhìdù lùn,” British Journal of the History of Philosophy 29.5 (2021), pp. 739–762, with Jing Huang.
- “Bringing Pessoa into the philosophy curriculum,” in Approaches to Teaching the Works of Fernando Pessoa, edited by Paulo de Medeiros and Jerónimo Pizarro (New York: The Modern Languages Association of America, 2025), pp. 155–60.
- “Self-knowledge and attachment: A view from Madhyamaka,” in Truth and Knowledge in an Empty World: Essays on Epistemology and Madhyamaka in Honor of Tom Tillemans, edited by John Dunne and Sara McClintock (Wisdom, 2026), pp. 145–159.
- “Names used twice over,” in Thinking without Borders: Essays in Honour of Arindam Chakrabarti, edited by Amy Donahue, Matt MacKenzie and Anand Vaidya (London: Bloomsbury Academic, 2026).
- “Is Nyāya disjunctivist? The ontology of illusion,” in The Vindication of the World: Essays Engaging with Stephen Phillips, edited by Malcolm Keating and Matthew Dasti (Routledge, 2024), pp. 159–177.
- “Self-knowledge and attachment,” in Self-Knowledge and Moral Identity, edited by Ranjan Kumar Panda (New Delhi: Tulika Books, 2023), pp. 155–171.
- “Attending to absence, and the role of the imagination,” in Scenes of Attention: An Interdisciplinary Inquiry, edited by Graham Burnett and Justin E. H. Smith (New York: Columbia University Press, 2023), pp. 142–159.
- “Why philosophy needs Sanskrit, now more than ever,” in Comparative Philosophy and Method: Contemporary Practices and Future Possibilities, edited by Steven Burik, Robert Smid and Ralph Weber (London: Bloomsbury Academic, 2022), pp. 139–158.
- “Buddhism after Buddhist modernism,” in a symposium on Evan Thompson’s Why I am Not a Buddhist?, APA Asian and Asian-American Philosophers and Philosophies Newsletter, edited by Minh Nguyen (Spring, 2021).
- “Pessoa’s imaginary India,” in Fernando Pessoa & Philosophy, edited by Bartholomew Ryan, Giovanbattista Tusa, and Antonio Cardiello (Boulder, Co.: Rowman & Littlefield, 2021).
- “Epistemic pluralism: from systems to stances,” Journal of the American Philosophical Association (2019): 1–21.
- “Mental time travel and attention,” Australasian Philosophical Review 1.4 (2018): 353–373.
- “Epistemology from a Sanskritic point of view,” in Epistemology for the Rest of the World, edited by Masaharu Mizumoto, Stephen Stich and Eric McCready (Oxford: Oxford University Press, 2018), pp. 12–21.
- “Illusions of immortality,” in Imaginations of Death and Beyond in India and Europe, edited by Sudhir Kakar and Günter Blamberger (Delhi: Springer, 2018), pp. 35–45.
- “What is philosophy? A cross-cultural conversation in the cross-roads court of Chosroes,” The Harvard Review of Philosophy 24 (Spring 2017): 1–8.
- “The wandering ascetic and the manifest world,” in Hindu Law: A New History of Dharmaśāstra, edited by Patrick Olivelle and Don Davis (Oxford: Oxford University Press, 2017), pp. 442–454.
- “Attention to greatness: Buddhaghosa,” in Stephen Hetherington ed., What Makes a Philosopher Great? (London: Routledge, 2017), pp. 67–85.
- “Freedom in thinking: Intellectual decolonisation and the immersive cosmopolitanism of K. C. Bhattacharyya,” in The Oxford Handbook of Indian Philosophy (Oxford: Oxford University Press, 2017), pp. 718–736.
- “Śrīharṣa’s dissident epistemology: Of knowledge as assurance,” in The Oxford Handbook of Indian Philosophy (Oxford: Oxford University Press, 2017), pp. 522–538.
- “Philosophical modernities: polycentricity and early modernity in India,” Royal Institute of Philosophy Supplement 74 (2014): 75–94.
- “Philosophy as a way of life: spiritual exercises from the Buddha to Tagore,” in Philosophy as a Way of Life: Ancients and Moderns. Essays in Honour of Pierre Hadot, edited by Michael Chase, Stephen Clark and Michael McGhee (Oxford: Blackwell Publishing, 2014), pp. 116–131.
- “Dārā Shikoh and the transmission of the Upaniṣads to Islam,” in Migrating Texts and Traditions, edited by William Sweet (Ottawa: University of Ottawa Press, 2012), pp. 150–161.
- “The geography of shadows: souls and cities in Philip Pullman’s His Dark Materials,” Philosophy & Literature 35 (2011): 269–281, with Panayiota Vassilopoulou.
- “Apoha, feature-placing, and sensory content,” in Buddhist Semantics and Human Cognition, edited by Arindam Chakrabarti, Mark Siderits and Tom Tillemans (New York: Columbia University Press, 2011), pp. 228–246.
- “Emergentisms, ancient and modern,” Mind 120 (July 2011): 671–703.
- “Subjectivity, selfhood, and the use of the word ‘I’,” in Self, No-self ?, edited by Dan Zahavi, Evan Thomson and Mark Siderits (Oxford: Oxford University Press, 2010), pp. 176–192.
- “Can you seek the answer to this question? The paradox of inquiry in India,” Australasian Journal of Philosophy 88 (2010): 571–594, with Amber Carpenter.
- “Intellectual India: reason, identity, dissent”, New Literary History 40.2 (2009): 248–263.
- “Sanskrit philosophical commentary: reading as philosophy”, Journal of the Indian Council of Philosophical Research 25.1 (2008): 107–127.
- “What you are you do not see, what you see is your shadow: The philosophical double in Mauni’s fiction,” in The Poetics of Shadows: The Double in Literature and Philosophy, edited by Andrew Hock Soon Ng (Hanover: Ibidem-Verlag, March 2008). pp. 109–122.
- “Towards a formal regimentation of the Navya-Nyāya technical language I,” in Logic, Navya-Nyāya and Applications: Homage to Bimal Krishna Matilal, edited by Mihir Chakraborty, Benedikt Loewe and Madhabendra Mitra (London: College Publications, 2008), pp. 109–124.
- “Contextualism in the study of Indian philosophical cultures,” Journal of Indian Philosophy 36 (2008): 551–562.
- “Universals and other generalities,” in Peter F. Strawson and Arindam Chakrabarti, eds. Universals, Concepts and Qualities: New Essays on the Meaning of Predicates (London: Ashgate 2006), pp. 51–66.
- “Ancient Indian logic as a theory of case-based reasoning,” Journal of Indian Philosophy 31 (2003): 33–45.
- “An irrealist theory of self,” The Harvard Review of Philosophy 12 (Spring 2004): 61–80.
- “The ritual roots of moral reason,” in Thinking Through Rituals: Philosophical Perspectives, edited by Kevin Schilbrack (London: Routledge, 2004), pp. 207–233.
- “Indian Logic”, in Handbook of the History of Logic, Volume 1: Greek, Indian and Arabic Logic, edited by D.M. Gabbay and J. Woods (North Holland: Elsevier, 2004), pp. 255–332.
- “Jaina logic and the philosophical basis of pluralism”, History and Philosophy of Logic 23 (2002): 267–281.
- “Worlds in conflict: Yaśovijaya Gaṇi’s cosmopolitan vision,” International Journal of Jaina Studies 4.1 (2008): 1–11.
- “Objectivity and proof in a classical Indian theory of number”, Synthese 129.3 (2001): 413–437.
- “Argumentation, dialogue and the Kathāvatthu,” Journal of Indian Philosophy 29.4 (2001): 485–493.
- “Cross-modality and the self,” Philosophy and Phenomenological Research 61.3 (2000): 639–658.
- “Dharmakīrti’s semantics for the quantifier only”, in Shoryu Katsura ed., Dharmakīrti’s Thought and Its Impact on Indian and Tibetan Philosophy (Wien: Verlag der Österreichischen Akademie Der Wissenschaften, 1999), pp. 101–116.
