= Anton Charles Pegis =

American philosopher and theologian (1905–1978)

- Born: Anton Charles Pegis; August 24, 1905; Milwaukee, Wisconsin, US
- Died: May 13, 1978 (aged 72); Toronto, Ontario, Canada

Academic background
- Education: Marquette University; Institute of Mediaeval Studies, University of Toronto
- Doctoral advisor: Étienne Gilson; Gerald Phelan

Academic work
- Discipline: Philosophy, theology
- Doctoral students: Edward A. Synan

Anton Charles Pegis (August 24, 1905 – May 13, 1978) was an American philosopher and historian of philosophy in the tradition of Thomas Aquinas. Pegis was the earliest of what would become a prominent group of historians of medieval philosophy, including Joseph Owens and Armand Maurer, who studied under Étienne Gilson and spent the majority of their careers teaching at the Pontifical Institute of Mediaeval Studies. Pegis served as president of the institute from 1946 to 1952.

== Education ==
Pegis was born in Milwaukee, Wisconsin, to parents of Greek descent. His parents gave him instruction in Greek language, which would later prove valuable in his academic career. Pegis received a B.A. from Marquette University in 1928. In the fall of 1928, while a scholarship student at University of Chicago, Pegis took inspiration from the lectures of Carl Darling Buck and Paul Shorey. In 1929, he completed his M.A. at Marquette University.

In the fall of 1929, Pegis entered the recently founded Institute of Mediaeval Studies at St. Michael's College of the University of Toronto, where he studied under Étienne Gilson and Gerald Phelan. He earned the Ph.D. in philosophy for his dissertation entitled The Problem of the Soul in the Thirteenth Century in 1931.

== Career ==
Pegis began teaching in 1931 on the philosophy faculty of his alma mater, the University of Marquette, as an instructor and later as an assistant professor. In 1937 he left Marquette to take a teaching position at Fordham University, and he returned to the University of Toronto in 1944, where he took posts as a professor of philosophy in the Graduate Department of Philosophy, and as a professor of the history of philosophy in the Pontifical Institute of Mediaeval Studies In 1946 Pegis was elected the First Fellow of the institute, and served as its president from 1946 to 1954. Pegis was also elected President of the American Catholic Philosophical Association in 1946, and in 1950 he was elected a Fellow of the Royal Society of Canada.

Pegis left the Pontifical Institute of Mediaeval Studies in 1954 to assume the editorial directorship of Doubleday's Catholic textbook division. In 1961 he returned to Toronto and resumed full time teaching, both at the Institute and at the University of Toronto. Despite becoming emeritus in 1971, he was asked, on account of his popularity, to continue his graduate lectures, which he did until his retirement in 1974. During his retirement he worked to develop the Center of Thomistic Studies at the University of St. Thomas in Houston, where he lectured on the philosophy of Thomas Aquinas, Edmund Husserl, and Martin Heidegger. He continued to give lectures on philosophy until just a few days before his death. He died on May 13, 1978, in Wellesley Hospital, Toronto.

== Philosophy ==
Pegis, along with Gilson, was a firm advocate of Pope Leo XIII's Aeterni Patris and its exhortation to a revival of Thomism. In his book Christian Philosophy and Intellectual Freedom, he wrote that "the light of divine truth helps the human intellect to philosophize in a better way, and does this without in the least coloring or compromising the specific nature of philosophy."

His colleague Armand Maurer described Pegis's philosophy as follows:

Pegis’ main concern was to be himself a philosopher, using as tools the history of philosophy and contemporary philosophical ideas. He read deeply in the modern philosophers, especially Husserl, and in later life some of his most memorable and popular lectures were devoted to the problem of intentionality against the background of Husserl’s phenomenology and the philosophies of Aristotle and St. Thomas.

== Works ==
- The Problem of the Soul in the 13th Century (Toronto: Institute of Medieval Studies, 1934)
- Saint Thomas and the Greeks (Milwaukee: Marquette University Press, 1939)
- Basic writings of Saint Thomas Aquinas, edited and annotated, with an introduction, by Anton C. Pegis (New York: Random House, 1945)
- The Wisdom of Catholicism (New York: Random House, 1949)
- Christian Philosophy and Intellectual Freedom (Milwaukee: Bruce, 1955)
- At the Origins of the Thomistic Notion of Man (New York: MacMillan, 1963)
- The Middle Ages and Philosophy (Chicago: Regnery, 1963)
- Saint Thomas and Philosophy (Milwaukee: Marquette University Press, 1964)
