= Society for Medieval and Renaissance Philosophy =

- Abbreviation: SMRP
- Formation: 1978; 48 years ago
- Type: Learned society
- Tax ID no.: 13-3000478
- Legal status: 501(c)(3) charitable organization
- President: Therese Cory
- Website: smrpphil.org

The Society for Medieval and Renaissance Philosophy is a learned society established in 1978 to support teaching and research relating to medieval and renaissance philosophy. Presidents of the society have included Arthur Hyman, Marilyn Adams, James Ross, Jorge Gracia, Mary Clark, and R. James Long.

== Presidents ==
- 1977–1980 Arthur Hyman
- 1981–1982 Marilyn McCord Adams
- 1983–1984 John F. Wippel
- 1985–1986 James Ross
- 1987–1988 Edward Mahoney
- 1989–1990 Stephen Brown
- 1991–1992 Jorge J. E. Gracia
- 1993–1994 Mary T. Clark
- 1995–1996 Alfred Ivry
- 1997–1998 Paul V. Spade
- 1999–2000 A. Stephen McGrade
- 2001–2002 Therese-Anne Druart
- 2003–2004 Steven P. Marrone
- 2005–2006 R. James Long
- 2007–2008 Gordon Wilson
- 2009–2010 Helen S. Lang
- 2011–2012 Timothy Noone
- 2013–2014 Richard Charles Taylor
- 2015–2016 Eileen Sweeney
- 2017 Bonnie Kent
- 2018–2019 Tamar Rudavsky
- 2020-2021 Therese Cory
- 2022-2023 Gloria Frost
- 2024-2025 Robert Pasnau
- 2026-2027 Stephen Ogden
