= Bimal Krishna Matilal =

British-Indian philosopher (1935–1991)

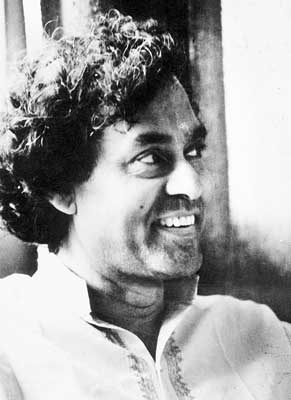
- Portrait of Bimal Krishna Matilal
- Born: 1 June 1935; Jaynagar Majilpur, Calcutta, Bengal Presidency, British India (present-day South 24 Parganas, West Bengal, India)
- Died: 8 June 1991 (aged 56); Oxford, England, United Kingdom
- Awards: Padma Bhushan (1990)

Education
- Education: Sanskrit, Mathematics and Logic
- Alma mater: Maulana Azad College; Harvard University

Philosophical work
- Notable works: Founding editor of the Journal of Indian Philosophy

Bimal Krishna Matilal (1 June 1935 – 8 June 1991) was an Indian philosopher of Sanskrit grammar and logic whose writings presented the Indian philosophical tradition as a comprehensive system of logic incorporating most issues addressed by themes in Western philosophy. Born in Calcutta, he lived and worked in Calcutta, Harvard, Toronto and Oxford. From 1977 to 1991, he served as the Spalding Professor of Eastern Religion and Ethics at the University of Oxford.

== Education ==
Literate in Sanskrit from an early age, Matilal was also drawn towards Mathematics and Logic. He was trained in the traditional Indian philosophical system by leading scholars of the Sanskrit College, where he himself was a teacher from 1957 to 1962. He was taught by scholars like Pandit Tāranatha Tarkatīrtha and Kālipada Tarkācārya. He also interacted with pandit Ananta Kumar Nyāyatarkatārtha, Madhusūdana Nyāyācārya and Viāvabandhu Tarkatīrtha. He was awarded the upādhi (degree) of Tarkatīrtha (Master of Logic) in 1962.

While teaching at the Sanskrit College (an affiliated college of the University of Calcutta) between 1957 and 1962, Matilal came in contact with Daniel Ingalls, an Indologist at Harvard University, who encouraged him to join the PhD program there. Matilal secured a Fulbright fellowship and completed his PhD under Ingalls on the Navya-Nyāya doctrine of negation, between 1962 and 1965. During this period, he also studied with Willard Van Orman Quine. Subsequently, he was professor of Sanskrit at the University of Toronto, and in 1977 he was elected Spalding Professor at Oxford, succeeding Sarvepalli Radhakrishnan and Robert Charles Zaehner.

== Death ==
Matilal died of cancer on 8 June 1991.

== Awards ==
- Padma Bhushan 1990

== Works by Matilal ==
In his work, he presented Indian logic, particularly Nyāya-Vaiśeṣika, Mīmāṃsā and Buddhist philosophy, as being relevant in modern philosophical discourse. Matilal presented Indian philosophical thought more as a constructive program than a mere exposition. This helped create a vibrant revival of interest in India's philosophical traditions as a relevant source of ideas rather than a dead discipline.

He was also the founding editor of the Journal of Indian Philosophy.

=== Books ===
- Bimal Krishna Matilal (1971). Epistemology, Logic and Grammar in Indian Philosophical Analysis. De Gruyter. ISBN 9789997821942.. Second edition, edited by Jonardon Ganeri (2015).
- Bimal Krishna Matilal (1985). Logic, Language, and Reality: an introduction to Indian philosophical studies. Motilal Banarsidass. ISBN 978-81-208-0008-3.
- Bimal Krishna Matilal (1986). Perception: An Essay on Classical Indian Theories of Knowledge. Clarendon.
- Logical and Ethical Issues: An essay on the Indian Philosophy of Religion, Calcutta University 1982 (repr. Chronicle Books, Delhi 2004)
- Navya Nyāya Doctrine of Negation, Harvard Oriental Series 46, 1968
- Bimal Krishna Matilal (1990). The Word and the World: India's contribution to the study of language. Oxford University Press. ISBN 978-0-19-562515-8.
- Bimal Krishna Matilal (1999). The Character of Logic in India (Edited by Jonardon Ganeri ed.). Oxford University Press. ISBN 978-0-19-564896-6.
- Bimal Krishna Matilal (2002). Mind, Language, and World. Collected Essays, Volume 1. Edited by Jonardon Ganeri. Oxford University Press.
- Bimal Krishna Matilal (2002). Ethics and Epics. Collected Essays, Volume 2. Edited by Jonardon Ganeri. Oxford University Press.
- Niti, Yukti o Dharma, (in Bengali), Ananda Publishers Calcutta 1988.

== See also ==
- Indian logic
- Śākaṭāyana (Matilal discusses the claim that all nominals are ultimately derived from verbal roots)
- Nyāya Sūtras
