= Richard Charles Taylor =

American philosopher

Education
- Education: University of Toronto (MA, PhD), State University of New York at Buffalo (BA)

Philosophical work
- Era: 21st-century philosophy
- Region: Western philosophy
- Institutions: Marquette University
- Main interests: medieval philosophy, ancient Greek philosophy, Islamic philosophy

Richard Charles Taylor is an American philosopher and Professor of Philosophy at Marquette University. He is known for his works on medieval philosophy, ancient Greek philosophy, and Islamic philosophy. He is a former president of the American Catholic Philosophical Association and a former president of the Society for Medieval and Renaissance Philosophy.

== Works ==
=== Translations ===
- Averroes (Ibn Rushd) of Cordoba. Long Commentary on the De Anima of Aristotle, Richard C. Taylor, trans. & intro., Therese-Anne Druart, subeditor. New Haven: Yale University Press, 2009
- St. Thomas Aquinas. Commentary on the Book of Causes. Vincent A. Guagliardo, O.P., Charles R. Hess, O.P., and Richard C. Taylor, trans. Washington, D.C.: Catholic University of America Press, 1996.

=== Edited books ===
- Albert the Great and His Arabic Sources. Medieval Science Between Inheritance and Emergence, Katja Krause and Richard C. Taylor, eds., Brepols Publishers: Turnhout, 2024
- Routledge Companion to Islamic Philosophy, Richard C. Taylor & Luis X. López-Farjeat, eds. London & New York: Routledge, 2016
- The Judeo-Christian-Islamic Heritage. Philosophical and Theological Perspectives, Richard C. Taylor and Irfan Omar, eds. Milwaukee: Marquette University Press, 2012
- Tolle Lege: Essays on Augustine and on Medieval Philosophy in Honor of Roland J. Teske, SJ, Richard C. Taylor, David Twetten, and Michael Wreen, eds. Milwaukee: Marquette University Press, 2011
- The Cambridge Companion to Arabic Philosophy, Peter Adamson and Richard C. Taylor, eds. Cambridge: Cambridge University Press, 2005
- Moral Philosophy: Historical and Contemporary Essays, William C. Starr and Richard C. Taylor, eds., Milwaukee, WI: Marquette University Press, 1989
- The Life of Religion. A Marquette University Symposium on the Nature of Religious Belief, Stanley M. Harrison and Richard C. Taylor, eds. Lanham, MD: University Press of America, 1986
