= American Catholic Philosophical Association =

- Abbreviation: ACPA
- Formation: 1926; 100 years ago
- Type: Learned society
- Region served: United States
- Website: acpaweb.org

The American Catholic Philosophical Association (ACPA) is an organization of Catholic philosophers established in 1926 to promote the advancement of philosophy as an intellectual discipline consonant with Catholic tradition. Among the means used to achieve this objective, the organization strives to develop philosophical scholarship, to improve the teaching of philosophy, and to communicate with other individuals and groups with similar aims.

The organization sponsors an annual conference and several scholarly publications, including a peer-reviewed journal, American Catholic Philosophical Quarterly, and the Proceedings of the American Catholic Philosophical Association. Individual and institutional members of the ACPA receive online access to all ACPA publications as a benefit of membership.

Memberships, conference registrations, and continuing publication of the journal and proceeding, in both print and electronic formats, are managed for the ACPA by the Philosophy Documentation Center.

== Publications ==
- American Catholic Philosophical Quarterly, 1990–present
- The New Scholasticism, 1927–1989
- Philosophical Studies of the American Catholic Philosophical Association, 1938–1952
- Proceedings of the American Catholic Philosophical Association, 1927–present

== Presidents ==
- 1926–1928 Edward A. Pace
- 1929 John F. McCormick
- 1930 James H. Ryan
- 1931 Gerald B. Phelan
- 1932 James A. McWilliams
- 1933 Charles C. Miltner
- 1934 Francis Augustine Walsh
- 1935 John O. Riedl
- 1936 John J. Toohey
- 1937 William T. Dillon
- 1938 Ignatius Smith
- 1939 William P. O'Connor
- 1940 Francis E. McMahon
- 1941 Fulton J. Sheen
- 1942 Joseph Schabert
- 1945 Leo R. Ward
- 1946 Anton Charles Pegis
- 1947 Joaquin Garcia
- 1948 Vernon J. Bourke
- 1950 Ernest Kilzer
- 1951 Gerard Smith
- 1952 Francis X. Meehan
- 1953 Elizabeth G. Salmon
- 1954 James Collins
- 1955 Charles J. O'Neil
- 1956 Vincent E. Smith
- 1957 George P. Klubertanz
- 1958 Allan Wolter
- 1959 Lawrence E. Lynch
- 1960 Robert Lechner
- 1961 William M. Walton
- 1962 Carl W. Grindel
- 1963 Donald Gallagher
- 1964 James A. Weisheipl
- 1965 John A. Oesterle
- 1966 Joseph Owens
- 1967 Ernan McMullin
- 1968 Robert J. Kreyche
- 1969 W. Norris Clarke
- 1970 William A. Wallace
- 1971 Louis Dupré
- 1972 Ralph McInerny
- 1973 Gerald Kreyche
- 1974 Thomas Langan
- 1975 Jude P. Dougherty
- 1976 Desmond J. FitzGerald
- 1977 Mary T. Clark
- 1978 Kenneth L. Schmitz
- 1979 Armand A. Maurer
- 1980 Henry B. Veatch
- 1981 Leo Sweeney
- 1982 John T. Noonan
- 1983 Marc Griesbach
- 1984 Germain Grisez
- 1985 Cornelius F. Delaney
- 1986 Francis J. Lescoe
- 1987 John F. Wippel
- 1988 John D. Caputo
- 1989 Joseph M. Boyle
- 1990 Gerald A. McCool
- 1991 Frederick J. Crosson
- 1992 Mary F. Rousseau
- 1993 Lawrence Dewan
- 1994 Thomas R. Flynn
- 1995 Robert E. Wood
- 1996 Thomas C. Anderson
- 1997 Linda Zagzebski
- 1998 Jorge J. E. Gracia
- 1999 Thomas A. Russman
- 2000 Eleonore Stump
- 2001 James F. Ross
- 2002 Patrick L. Bourgeois
- 2003 David B. Burrell
- 2004 Nicholas Rescher
- 2005 James L. Marsh
- 2006 Anthony J. Lisska
- 2007 Timothy B. Noone
- 2008 William Desmond
- 2009 Mary Beth Ingham
- 2010 Therese-Anne Druart
- 2011 Dominic Balestra
- 2012 Richard Charles Taylor
- 2013 John O'Callaghan
- 2014 Daniel Dahlstrom
- 2015 Jorge L. A. Garcia
- 2016 Kevin Flannery
- 2017 Thomas Hibbs
- 2018 Francis Beckwith
- 2019 Jean De Groot
- 2020 Thomas Cavanaugh
- 2021 Joshua Hochschild
- 2022 Steven Long
- 2023 Patrick Lee
- 2024 Mary Catherine Sommers
- 2025 D. C. Schindler
