= Peter Adamson (philosopher) =

American philosopher and historian (born 1972)

Peter Scott Adamson
- Born: Peter Scott Adamson; August 10, 1972 (age 54); Boston
- Occupation: Professor of philosophy

Academic background
- Education: Williams College; University of Notre Dame
- Thesis: The Arabic Plotinus: A Study of the “Theology of Aristotle” and Related Texts (2000)
- Doctoral advisor: David Burrell, Stephen Gersh

Academic work
- Institutions: King's College London; LMU Munich
- Main interests: History of philosophy: Ancient philosophy; Islamic philosophy; Neoplatonism; Medieval philosophy
- Notable works: History of Philosophy without any gaps (podcasts and book series)

Peter Scott Adamson (born August 10, 1972) is an American philosopher and intellectual historian. He holds two academic positions: professor of philosophy in late antiquity and in the Islamic world at LMU Munich; and professor of ancient and medieval philosophy at King's College London.

Adamson hosts the weekly podcast History of Philosophy Without Any Gaps, surpassing 25 million downloads in 2019. It attempts to make accessible the history of philosophy in all cultures. It has covered Greek philosophy, Islamic philosophy, and European philosophy up to the early modern era, and also launched series on Indian philosophy (with co-author Jonardon Ganeri), Africana philosophy (with co-author Chike Jeffers), and Chinese philosophy (with co-author Karyn Lai). Next to his other academic publications, Adamson has turned the podcast into an eponymous book series.

He received the Philip Leverhulme Prize in 2003 for "outstanding research achievements of young scholars of distinction and promise based in UK institutions", a subsequent grant in 2010. In 2020, he received the Schelling Prize from the Bavarian Academy of Sciences for work on multiculturalism in historical perspective. His latest book is Africana Philosophy from Ancient Egypt to the Nineteenth Century (2025).

== Biography ==
Adamson received his bachelor's degree from Williams College with summa cum laude in 1994 and his Ph.D. in philosophy from the University of Notre Dame in 2000. He has worked at King's College London from 2000, becoming professor of ancient and medieval philosophy there in 2009. In 2012, he obtained a joint appointment as professor of late ancient and Arabic philosophy at LMU Munich.

=== Personal life ===
Adamson lives in Munich with his wife (who is Bavarian) and children. He is fluent in English and German and can also work with texts in Ancient Greek, Arabic, Latin, French, Spanish, Italian, and more recently Persian. He advocates respecting religion as inseparable from philosophy, seeing religious thought as "philosophically fascinating and fruitful". In a 2019 interview, Adamson stated: "If I could live ten times, I'd like to spend nine of those lives specializing in different areas of the history of philosophy."

== Works ==
=== History of Philosophy Without Any Gaps ===
Adamson is the host of the History of Philosophy Without Any Gaps podcast, which started in 2010 and is ongoing as of 2026. The podcast examines philosophers and philosophical traditions throughout history. By 2014, it had more than four million downloads and thousands of followers.

The podcast led to the publication of a series of book adaptations. The first installment was titled Classical Philosophy: A History of Philosophy Without Any Gaps and was published in 2014. The second volume, Philosophy in the Hellenistic and Roman Worlds: A History of Philosophy Without Any Gaps, was published in 2015 and covered the period after Aristotle up to the death of St. Augustine. The third installment, Philosophy in the Islamic World: A History of Philosophy Without Any Gaps, covered philosophical traditions in the Islamic world, including Muslim, Jewish and Christian philosophers.

Adamson said that the goal of the series was to tell the history of philosophy in "an entertaining but not overly-simplified way". The Times of Israel contributor Daniel J. Levy described the podcast as "popular", "fun" and "easy to listen to". Levy also reviewed the third book, Philosophy in the Islamic World, and praised it for its presentation and wide coverage. Bruce Fleming, reviewing Philosophy in the Hellenistic and Roman Worlds praised the book. Malcolm Thorndike Nicholson of Prospect, reviewing Classical Philosophy, criticised the puns as "a problem", and the book in general for having "painful prose" and chapters that are "less comprehensive and less interesting" than the corresponding Wikipedia article.

=== Others ===
Other than the History of Philosophy series, Adamson wrote The Arabic Plotinus: a Philosophical Study of the 'Theology of Aristotle', focusing on the Theology of Aristotle in 2002 and Great Medieval Thinkers: al-Kindi on the Islamic philosopher Al-Kindi in 2007. As of 2014, he has published at least 40 articles and edited or co-edited at least nine books, mostly on philosophy in the Islamic world and on ancient philosophy. He and Richard C. Taylor co-edited the Cambridge Companion to Arabic Philosophy.

He has also appeared on BBC Radio, including several In Our Time programmes, and the Australian Broadcasting Corporation, to discuss his areas of work in history of philosophy.

== Awards ==
Adamson received the Philip Leverhulme Prize in 2003, for "outstanding research achievements of young scholars of distinction and promise based in UK institutions". In 2010, he received a nearly £250,000 grant from the same institution.

== Publications ==
=== Books ===
- The Arabic Plotinus: a philosophical study of the "Theology of Aristotle", Adamson, P., 2002, London: Duckworth.
- Al-Kindī, Adamson, P., 2007, Oxford: Oxford University Press. (Great medieval thinkers)
- The Philosophical Works of al-Kindī, Adamson, P. & Pormann, P. E., 2012, Karachi: OUP Pakistan.
- Studies on Plotinus and al-Kindī, Adamson, P. S., 2014, Ashgate Variorum.
- A History of Philosophy Without Any Gaps: Classical Philosophy (Book 1), Adamson, P. S., 2014, Oxford University Press.
- Studies on Early Arabic Philosophy, Adamson, P. S., 2015, Ashgate Variorum.
- Philosophy in the Islamic World: a Very Short Introduction, Adamson, P. S., 2015, Oxford: Oxford University Press.
- A History of Philosophy Without Any Gaps: Philosophy in the Hellenistic and Roman Worlds (Book 2), Adamson, P. S., 2015, Oxford University Press.
- A History of Philosophy Without Any Gaps: Philosophy in the Islamic World (Book 3), Adamson, P. S., 7 Jul 2016, Oxford University Press.
- A History of Philosophy Without Any Gaps: Medieval Philosophy (Book 4), Adamson, P., 2019, Oxford: Oxford University Press.
- A History of Philosophy Without Any Gaps: Classical Indian Philosophy (Book 5), Adamson, P. & Ganeri, J., 2020, Oxford: Oxford University Press.
- Great Medieval Thinkers: al-Rāzī, Adamson, P., New York: Oxford University Press.
- A History of Philosophy Without Any Gaps: Byzantine and Renaissance Philosophy (Book 6), Adamson, P., 2022, Oxford: Oxford University Press.
- Don't Think for Yourself: Authority and Belief in Medieval Philosophy, Adamson, P., 2022, University of Notre Dame Press.
- Ibn Sīnā (Avicenna): A Very Short Introduction, Adamson, P., 2023, Oxford, Oxford University Press.
- A History of Philosophy Without Any Gaps: Africana Philosophy From Ancient Egypt to the Nineteenth Century (Book 7), Adamson, P., 2025, Chike Jeffers, Oxford: Oxford University Press.
- A History of Philosophy Without Any Gaps: Philosophy in the Reformation (Book 8), Adamson, P., 2026, Oxford: Oxford University Press.
