= Arthur Hyman =

Arthur Hyman (1921–2017) was a professor of philosophy at Yeshiva University.

== Early life and career ==
Hyman was born in Schwäbisch Hall, Germany, on April 10, 1921. He was Dean of the Bernard Revel Graduate School until 2008, succeeded by David Berger. He taught philosophy at Yeshiva University for 55 years. He also taught at the Jewish Theological Seminary, Yale University, Columbia University and Hebrew University in Jerusalem.

Hyman's books and articles on medieval Jewish philosophy have been published worldwide; most noteworthy are his collections of essays on medieval Jewish, Christian, and Islamic philosophy, and his critical edition of Averroes.

Hyman made major contributions in medieval Jewish scholarship and Jewish studies. Hyman served as president of both the American Academy for Jewish Research and the Society for Medieval and Renaissance Philosophy. He also served on the board of directors of the Association for Jewish Studies.

Hyman was married to Ruth Link-Salinger and had three sons, Jeremy, Michael, and Joseph.

Hyman died on February 8, 2017.

== Scholarship ==
Hyman's publications include four volumes of Maimonidean Studies, which he edited, a critical edition of the Hebrew text and an English translation of Averroes’ De Substantia Orbis, and Essays in Medieval Jewish and Islamic Philosophy, which he edited while contributing an essay. He also co-edited the Salo W. Baron Jubilee Volume and the Harry A. Wolfson Jubilee Volume and co-authored Philosophy in the Middle Ages: The Christian, Islamic, and Jewish Traditions. Hyman's articles include “Maimonide, partisan du libre arbitre ou déterministe?” in Actes du Colloque Maïmonide, “Averroes’ Theory of the Intellect and the Ancient Commentators,” in Averroes and the Aristotelian Tradition, “Spinoza on Possibility and Contingency,” in Meetings of the Minds: The Relations between Medieval and Classical Modern European Philosophy, and “Medieval Jewish Philosophy as Philosophy, as Exegesis, and as Polemic,” in Miscellanea Mediaevalia.

== Published work ==
- Eschatological Themes in Medieval Jewish Philosophy
