= St. John Fisher Seminary Residence =

Coordinates: 41.0902°N 73.5350°W

- Arms of St. John Fisher Seminary
- Former names: St. John Fisher House of Formation
- Motto: "I Shall Make you Fishers of Men"
- Type: Roman Catholic seminary
- Established: 1989
- Rector: Rev. Paul N. Check
- Location: 894 Newfield Avenue, Stamford, Connecticut, United States
- Website: bridgeportvocations.org

St. John Fisher Seminary Residence is sponsored by the Diocese of Bridgeport, Connecticut. Men between the ages of eighteen and forty live at the Seminary while studying subjects based on a liberal arts curriculum, especially philosophy and classical languages, in preparation for graduate theological studies outside of the Diocese. St. John Fisher seminarians are formed to be faithful, perceptive, and well-balanced men. The formation experience at the Seminary is meant to leave an imprint on conscience, character, and manners; it is meant to develop style and to nourish action.

The Seminary opened in 1989. During the intervening years, the last two bishops of the Diocese of Bridgeport have appointed the five rectors who have served the seminary community.

The average time spent at St. John Fisher Seminary depends on the academic status of the seminarian. This can be anywhere from one to five years.

St. John Fisher is located on Newfield Avenue in Stamford, Connecticut. It is located on the campus of Trinity Catholic High School.

The residence was originally located in Trumbull, Connecticut, until the current larger building became available.

== Founding ==
The founding of St. John Fisher Seminary was entrusted to Msgr. Stephen DiGiovanni, H.E.D. by then Bridgeport Diocese Bishop Edward Egan, the former archbishop of New York. The seminary succeeded the St. John Fisher House of Formation, and was created to serve as a house of formation in philosophy and pre-Theologate requirements for men considering and being considered for the diocesan priesthood.

== Rectors ==
Msgr. DiGiovanni served as first rector of the seminary and continued as vocation director.

After Msgr. DiGiovanni (currently appointed rector of Basilica of Saint John the Evangelist in Stamford), Msgr. Kevin T. Royal was appointed rector. The third rector was the late Fr. Joseph Linck, followed by Fr. Samuel V. Scott. Fr. Robert M. Kinnally was appointed the fifth rector on June 1, 2011. Fr. Kinnally was followed by Fr. Paul N. Check in December 2016.

No.	Name	Years served
1.	Msgr. Stephen M. DiGiovanni	1989-1998
2.	Msgr. Kevin T. Royal	1998-2005
3.	Fr. Joseph Linck	2006-2008
4.	Fr. Samuel V. Scott	2008-2011
5.	Fr. Robert M. Kinnally	2011-2016
6.	Fr. Paul N. Check	2016

== Life at the seminary ==
Living in a seminary is very demanding. Seminarians are expected to be in chapel by 7:00 a.m. for lectio divina, or spiritual reading. Following this, is Mass and Lauds. The rest of the day is spent working on academics, or working in their assigned pastoral assignments. Vespers is always said in community as well as dinner.

Seminarians are expected to keep up their academic studies, while maintaining their spiritual lives. They are also encouraged to be well-rounded and civilized men. Seminarians are also expected to pray the Liturgy of the Hours and spend time in the presence of the Blessed Sacrament. The cultural formation of the seminarians is nurtured here, as well. Concerts of classical musicians in Connecticut and New York City are part of the program. A number of the men are themselves musicians and take piano, voice, and organ lessons at Sacred Heart University. The Seminary has a Boston grand piano in the Chapel of the Holy Cross and a Steinway vertical piano in the music practice room.

== Academics ==
The time spent at St. John Fisher varies on the status of the individual seminarian. Men who do not hold a college degree reside at the Seminary until they receive their undergraduate degree in philosophy at Sacred Heart University or Fordham University. Men who have earned their undergraduate degrees elsewhere are given a course of study which is in compliance with the USCCB's Program of Priestly Formation and includes 33 credits of philosophy to prepare them for graduate courses in theology at a major seminary. Pre-theologians usually spend 2–3 years at St. John Fisher Seminary.

Alumni of St. John Fisher Seminary are currently in formation at Theological College (Catholic University of America), Washington, D.C; Pontifical North American College, Vatican City State; St. Joseph's Seminary, Yonkers, New York and St. John XXIII National Seminary, Weston Mass.

Because St. John Fisher Seminary is a house of formation, growth in every aspect of a candidate's human, spiritual, intellectual, and pastoral formation is at the core of the program. Seminary formators assist the seminarian in these various aspects of seminary life.

== Faculty ==
St. John Fisher Seminary is staffed by four priests: the rector, vocation director, spiritual director, and academic dean.

- The diocesan vocation director is Fr. Christopher Ford.
- The spiritual director is Fr. David Leopold.
- The academic dean is Msgr. Christopher J. Walsh, Ph.D.
- Msgr. Alan F. Detscher, S.L.D., Professor of Liturgy
- Fr. Richard Cipolla, Ph.D., D. Phil. (Oxon), instructor of Ecclesiastical Latin
- Dr. Edward Duffy, Professor of New Testament Greek, Hartford Seminary
- Dr. Roger Duncan, Professor of Philosophy, Holy Apostles College and Seminary
- Dr. James Long, Professor of Philosophy, Fairfield University
- Dr. Diane Traflet, Professor of Theology, Seton Hall University
