= Index to Scientific & Technical Proceedings =

Index to Scientific and Technical Proceedings
- Producer: Thomson Reuters
- History: 1978 – present
- Languages: English

Access
- Providers: DMDI
- Cost: Subscription

Coverage
- Disciplines: Natural Sciences/Biosciences, Technology
- Record depth: Index & Abstract
- Format coverage: journal articles, conference proceedings, technical reports, books
- Temporal coverage: 1978–2010
- Geospatial coverage: Global

Links
- Website: www.dimdi.de/static/en/db/dbinfo/ii78.htm
- Title list(s): ISTPB + ISTP/ISSHP

The Index to Scientific & Technical Proceedings (ISTP) is a scholarly literature database, established in 1978. It has indexed material pertaining to international conference proceedings titles, locations, and dates. In addition, indexing terms, references, and abstracts contained within the database are searchable items. It appears that ISTP is combined with an index entitled Index to Social Sciences & Humanities Proceedings (ISSHP).

== Content ==
The subject coverage is life sciences, natural sciences, and applied sciences in the ISTP, ISSHP, and ISTPB databases. Social sciences, beginning in 1998, are found only in the ISTP and ISSHP databases. The sources are listed as conference proceedings, published in: journals, books, and book series. The above databases are listed within superbases known as: XBIOTECH, XMEDALL, XMEDPROD, XPHARMALL, XPSYCH, XTOXLITALL, XVET.

As of December 2008, there are 7,558,203 database records in the combined databases of ISTPB, ISTP, and ISSHP. These are updated weekly.

Searchable data fields are abstracts, book titles (only as far back as 1998), conferences, document type, index terms, section headings, series, title, and uncontrolled term.
