= James F. Ross =

American philosopher (1931–2010)

James Francis Ross
- Born: October 9, 1931; Providence, Rhode Island, U.S.
- Died: July 12, 2010 (aged 78); Boston, Massachusetts, U.S.

Philosophical work
- Era: 20th-century philosophy
- Region: Western Philosophy
- School: Analytic Philosophy
- Main interests: Philosophy of Religion, Philosophy of Language, Philosophy of Mind, Medieval Philosophy, Philosophy of Law

James Francis Ross (October 9, 1931 – July 12, 2010) was an American philosopher of religion, law, metaphysics and philosophy of mind. He was a member of the Philosophy Department at the University of Pennsylvania from 1962 until his death in 2010.

== Biography ==
Ross was born October 9, 1931, in Providence, Rhode Island, and died in Boston, Massachusetts, on July 12, 2010. He was son of the James Joseph and Teresa (Sullivan) Ross. His father was a pharmacist and his mother a school teacher. In 1956 he married Kathleen Fallon, a nurse from Providence, who died on May 23, 2010.

He received his A.B. (1953) and A.M. (1954) from Catholic University of America, Ph.D. (1958) from Brown University, and J.D. (1974) from the University of Pennsylvania. He was admitted to the Pennsylvania Bar in 1975. Ross began his academic career in the Philosophy Department at the University of Michigan initially as an instructor (1959–61) and then as an Assistant Professor (1961–62). In 1962 he joined the University of Pennsylvania and remained there until his death, as an assistant professor from 1962 to 1965, an associate professor from 1965 to 1968, and from 1968 onwards as a full professor. He held a number of visiting appointments including Visiting Lecturer Johns Hopkins (1964–65), the Institute for Advanced Study (Princeton) during the 1975–6 academic year, and Darwin College Cambridge University from September 1982 through December 1983. His research at the Institute for Advanced Study was supported by an NEH grant to the institute. He also led a 1977 NEH Summer Seminar at Brown University, titled Faith, Meaning and Religious Knowledge. From 1984 to 1986 he was the president of the Society for Medieval and Renaissance Philosophy.

He researched, taught, and wrote in the fields of medieval philosophy, philosophy of language, law, and religion. In a career that spanned more than five decades, he produced more than 100 articles, a number of translations, and four books. In the last book published before he died, Thought and World (2008) he argues that meaning, truth, impossibility, natural necessity, and our intelligent perception of nature fit together into a distinctly realist account of thought and world. He articulates a moderate realism about repeatable natural structures and our abstractive ability to discern them that poses a challenge to many of the common assumptions and claims of contemporary analytic philosophy. He develops a broadly Aristotelian metaphysics that recognizes the "hidden necessities" of things, which are disclosed through the sciences.

James Ross' scholarly examination of Analogy began with his doctoral thesis at Brown University (1958), led to such seminal articles as "Analogy as a Rule of Meaning for Religious Language" (1961) and "Analogy and the Resolution of Some Cognitivity Problems" (1970), and eventually to a monograph, Portraying Analogy (1981), which was the first fundamental examination of the topic since Cajetan (Thomas Cajetan) in 1498.

== Select bibliography ==
=== Doctoral thesis ===
- James F Ross, 1958, A Critical Analysis of the Theory of Analogy of St Thomas Aquinas, Brown University, (Ann Arbor, Michigan: University Microfilms Inc). (Mic 58–7663).

=== Monographs ===
- James F Ross, 2008, Thought and World: The Hidden Necessities, Notre Dame: University of Notre Dame Press.
- James F Ross, 1982, Portraying Analogy, Cambridge: Cambridge University Press.
- James F Ross, 1969, Introduction to the Philosophy of Religion, Macmillan.
- James F Ross, 1968, Philosophical Theology, Bobbs Merrill.

=== Articles ===
- James Ross, 2009, "Contextual Adaptation," American Philosophical Quarterly, Vol 46, No.1 (January 2009), 19–30.
- James F Ross, 2008, "Simplicity and the Talk About God," in Dewi Zephaniah Phillips (ed.), Whose God? Which Tradition? The Nature of Belief in God, (Aldershot, Hants., UK: Ashgate Publishing Ltd), pp. 81–91.
- James Ross, 2005, "Adapting Aquinas: Analogy and Forms", Proceedings of the American Catholic Philosophical Association, vol. 78, pp. 41–58, ISSN 0065-7638.
- James F Ross [and Todd Bates], 2003, "Duns Scotus on Natural Theology," in Thomas Williams (ed.), The Cambridge Companion to Duns Scotus, (Cambridge: Cambridge University Press), pp. 193–237.
- James F Ross, 2003, "Thomas Aquinas, Summa theologiae (c. 1273), Christian Wisdom Explained Philosophically", in The Classics of Western Philosophy: A Reader's Guide, (eds.) Jorge J. E. Gracia, Gregory M. Reichberg, Bernard N. Schumacher (Oxford: Blackwell Publishing, 2003), pp. 143–166.
- James F Ross, 2002, [2001 Presidential Address] ".....Together with the Body that I Love.....," in Michael Baur, ed., Person, Soul, and Immortality: Proceedings of the American Catholic Philosophical Association, (New York: American Catholic Philosophical Association), vol. 75, pp. 1–22.
- James Ross, 1999, "Religious Language," in Brian Davies (ed.), Philosophy of Religion: A Guide to the Subject, (Georgetown University Press), pp. 106–135.
- James F Ross, 1996, "Real Freedom", in Jeff Jordan and Daniel Howard-Snyder (eds.), Faith, Freedom, and Rationality: Philosophy of Religion Today, (Lanham, MD: Rowman & Littlefield Publishers, Inc.), pp. 89–118.
- James F Ross, 1994, "Rational Reliance," Journal of the American Academy of Religion, Vol. LXII, No. 3, pp. 769–798.
- James F Ross, 1993, 'Musical Standards as Function of Musical Accompaniment' in Krausz, M. (ed.), The Interpretation of Music, Philosophical Essays, (Oxford: Clarendon Press), pp. 89–102.
- James F Ross, 1993, "Cognitive Finality," in Linda Zagzebski (ed.) Rational Faith: Responses to Reformed Expistemology, (Notre Dame, Indiana: University of Notre Dame Press), pp. 226–255.
- James Ross, 1992, "Semantic Contagion," in Adrienne Lehrer and Eva Feder Kittay (eds.), Frames, Fields, and Contrasts: New Essays in Semantic and Lexical Organization, (Hillsdale, N.J: Lawrence Erlbaum Associates, Publishers), pp. 143–169.
- James Ross, 1992, "Reason and Reliance: Adjusted Prospects for Natural Theology," in Eugene Thomas Long (ed.), Prospects for natural theology, (Washington, D.C. : Catholic University of America Press), pp. 49–80.
- James Ross, 1992, "Immaterial Aspects of Thought," The Journal of Philosophy, vol.89, no. 3 (March 1992), pp. 136–150.
- James F Ross, 1992, "On Christian Philosophy: Una Vera Philosophia?", The Monist, vol. 75, no. 3 (July 1992), pp. 354–380, ISSN 0026-9662.
- James F Ross, 1991, "Response to Maurer and Dewan," American Catholic Philosophical Quarterly, vol. 65, no.2 (Spring 1991), pp. 235–243.
- James F Ross, 1990, "The Fate of the Analysis: Aristotle's Revenge," Proceedings of the American Catholic Philosophical Association, vol. 64, pp. 51–74, ISSN 0065-7638.
- James Ross, 1990, "Aquinas's Exemplarism; Aquinas's Voluntarism", American Catholic Philosophical Quarterly, vol. 64, no. 2, pp. 171–198, ISSN 1051-3558.
- James F Ross, 1989, "The Crash of Modal Metaphysics", The Review of Metaphysics, Vol. 43, No. 2 (Dec. 1989), pp. 251–279, ISSN 0034-6632.
- James F Ross, 1987, "Aquinas on Annihilation," in John F Wippel (ed.), Studies in Medieval Philosophy, Studies in Philosophy and the History of Philosophy, vol.17, (Washington, D.C.: The Catholic University of America Press), pp. 177–199.
- James F Ross, 1986, "Believing for Profit," in Gerald D. McCarthy (ed.) The Ethics of Belief Debate, (AAR Studies in Religion, 41 Atlandt, GA: Scholars Press), 221–235.
- James F Ross, 1986, "God, Creator of Kinds and Possibilities: Requiescant universalia ante res, in Robert Audi and William J Wainwright (eds.), Rationality, Religious Belief, and Moral Commitment: New Essays in the Philosophy of Religion (Ithaca, NY: Cornell University Press, 1986), pp. 315-334.
- James F Ross, 1985, "The Miracle Of Theism: Arguments for and against the existence of God," The Review of Metaphysics, vol. 38, no. 3, pp. 657 – 659.
- James Ross, 1985, "Comments on "Absolute Simplicity"," Faith and Philosophy, vol. 2, no. 4, pp. 383 - 391.
- James F Ross, 1985, "Aquinas on Belief and Knowledge," in William A Frank and Girard J Etzkorn (eds.), Essays Honoring Allen B. Wolter (Franciscan Institute Publications Theology Series No 10), pp. 245–269. ISBN 978-99952-70-01-8
- James F Ross, 1983, "Creation II," in Alfred J Freddoso(ed.), The Existence and Nature of God, (Notre Dame: University of Notre Dame Press), pp. 115–143.
- James F Ross, 1980, "Preface to the Second Printing," Philosophical Theology, Hackett Pub., i-xxxviii.
- James F Ross, 1980, "Creation," Journal of Philosophy, vol. 77, pp. 614–629.
- James F Ross, 1980, "Unless you believe you will not understand," in Eugene Thomas Long (ed.), Experience, Reason and God, Studies in Philosophy and the History of Philosophy, vol. 8 (Washington, DC: The Catholic University of America Press), pp. 113–128.
- James F Ross, 1980, "A Natural Rights Basis for Substantive Due Process of Law in U.S. Jurisprudence," Universal Human Rights, vol. 2 no.2, pp. 61–79.
- James F Ross, 1977. "Impasse on Competing Descriptions of God An Impasse on Competing Descriptions of God," International Journal for Philosophy of Religion, vol. 8, no. 4 (1977), pp. 233–249.
- James F Ross, 1975, "Testimonial Evidence," in Keith Lehrer (ed.), Analysis and Metaphysics: Essays in Honor of R. M. Chisholm, (Dordrecht [Holland]: D. Reidel), pp. 35–55.
- James F Ross, 1974, "Justice is Reasonableness: Aquinas on Human Law and Morality," The Monist, vol. 58, no. 1 (January 1974), pp. 86–103.
- James F Ross, 1974, "On the Concepts of Reading," The Philosophical Forum, vol. 6 (Fall 1972): 93–141.
- James F Ross, 1974, "Justice Is Reasonableness: Aquinas on Human Law and Morality," The Monist, vol. 58, no. 1, pp. 86–103, ISSN 0026-9662.
- James F Ross, 1972, "Religious Knowledge", Proceedings of the American Catholic Philosophical Association, vol. 46, pp. 29–42, ISSN 0065-7638.
- James F Ross, 1971, "A Response to Mr. Henry", The Thomist, vol. 35, No. 2, pp. 305–311.
- James F Ross, 1970, "A Review Article of God and the World, by John B Cobb, Jr., Philadelphia: The Westminster Press, 1969, 138 pages," Journal of the American Academy of Religion, vol. 38, no.3(September 1970), pp. 310–315.
- James F Ross, 1970, "Aquinas and Philosophical Methodology," Metaphilosophy, Vol. 1, No. 4, pp. 300–317, doi:10.1111/j.1467-9973.1970.tb00609. (Delivered as the Ignatius Smith Memorial Lecture at Catholic University of America, March 1969 under the title, "St Thomas and Philosophical Methodology".)
- James F Ross, 1970, "On Proofs for the Existence of God," The Monist, vol. 54, no. 2, pp. 201–217, ISSN 0026-9662
- James F Ross, 1970, "A New Theory of Analogy", Proceedings of the American Catholic Philosophical Association, vol. 44, pp. 70–85, ISSN 0065-7638.
- James F Ross, 1970, "A Reply to Crites: Verification or Certification? The Place of Community in Theology," Soundings, vol. 53, no.2 (Summer 1970), pp. 208–214.
- James F Ross, 1970, "Analogy and The Resolution of Some Cognitivity Problems", The Journal of Philosophy, vol. 67, no. 20 (October 1970), pp. 725–746.
- James F Ross, 1970, An Analysis of the Concepts of Reading. Final Report,, ERIC ED098520 Research Report, U.S. Office of Education, Project No. 08033, Grant No. De G-2-7000 28 (509) 1971.
- James F Ross, 1964, "Translator's Introduction", in On Formal and Universal Unity: De Unitate Formali et Universali by Francis Suarez,(Milwaukee: Marquette University Press, 1964), pp. 1–27.
- J F Ross, 1962, "Suárez on "universals"," The Journal of Philosophy, vol. 59 pp. 736-747.
- J F Ross, 1962, 'Did God Create the Only Possible World?', The Review of Metaphysics, vol. 16, no. 1 (September 1962), pp.14-25.
- James F Ross, 1962, "Does ‘x is possible’ ever yield ‘x exists?" Theoria, Vol. 28, No. 2,(August 1962), pp. 173.195.
- James F Ross, 1962, "Reply", International Philosophical Quarterly, vol. 2, no. 4, pp. 658–662, ISSN 0019-0365.
- James F Ross, 1961, "God and "Logical Necessity" God and "Logical Necessity"," The Philosophical Quarterly, vol. 11, no. 42 (January 1961), pp. 22-27.
- James Ross, 1961, "Seeing Stars," (Competition Prize Paper), Review of Metaphysics, vol.15, no.1 (September 1961), pp. 136–141.
- J F Ross, 1961, "Logically Necessary Existential Statements," The Journal of Philosophy,, vol. 58, no. 10 (May 1961), pp. 253–263.
- James F Ross, 1961, "Analogy as a Rule of Meaning for Religious Language", International Philosophical Quarterly, Vol. 1, No. 3 (September 1961), pp. 468–502.

=== Translations ===
- Suarez On Formal and Universal Unity: De Unitate Formali et Universali by Francis Suarez,(Milwaukee: Marquette University Press, 1964), James F Ross, Translator (Translated from Latin).
- Paul Bernard Grenet, Thomism: an Introduction, James F. Ross, Translator. (New York: Harper & Row, 1967) (Translated from French).

=== Book reviews ===
- James Ross, 2007, [review of] "Rethinking the Ontological Argument, by Daniel A Dombrowski," American Catholic Philosophical Quarterly, vol.81 no. 1, pp. 147–150.
- James F Ross, 2005, [review of] "Review of One Hundred Years of Philosophy edited by Brian J Shanley O.P.," The Thomist, vol. 69 no.3, pp. 488–492.
- James Ross, 2001, [review of] "The Metaphysics of Theism: Aquinas's Natural Theology in "Summa contra Gentiles" I by Norman Kretzmann, " Speculum, vol. 76, no. 1 (January 2001), pp. 185-187.
- James F Ross, 1998, [review of] "Aquinas and the Jews, by John Y. B. Hood, " Speculum, vol. 73, no. 3 (July 1998), pp. 854-856.
- James Ross, 1997, [review of] "Analogical Possibilities: How Words Refer to God, by Philip A Relnick," American Catholic Philosophical Quarterly, vol. 71, no. 4, pp. 638 - 641.
- James F Ross, 1994, [review of] "The Human Person, by David Braine," The Philosophical Quarterly, vol. 44, no. 177 (October 1994), pp. 536-538.
- James Ross, 1993, [review of] "On a Complex Theory of a Simple God: An Investigation in Aquinas' Philosophical Theology, by Christopher Hughes," Speculum, vol. 68, no. 4 (October 1993), pp. 1139-1140.
- James Ross, 1993, [review of] "The Philosophical Theology of St. Thomas Aquinas, by Leo J. Elders," Speculum, vol. 68, no. 4 (October 1993), pp. 1109-1110.
- James F Ross, 1993, [review of] "Aquinas on Mind, by Anthony Kenny," The Philosophical Quarterly, vol. 43, no. 173, Special Issue: Philosophers and Philosophies (October 1993), pp. 534-537.
- James F Ross, 1987, [review of] "Metaphysical Themes in Thomas Aquinas (review)," Journal of the History of Philosophy, vol. 25, no. 4, (October 1987), pp. 592–594.
- James F Ross, 1985, [review of] "The Miracle of Theism: Arguments for and against the Existence of God, by J. L. Mackie," The Review of Metaphysics, vol. 38, no. 3 (Mar. 1985), pp. 657–659, ISSN 0034-6632.
- James F Ross, 1984, [review of] "Suarez On Individuation. Metaphysical Disputation 5, Individual Unity and Its Principle," Journal of the History of Philosophy, vol. 22, no. 4, (October 1984), pp. 476–478.
- James F Ross, 1982, [review of] "The God of the Philosophers by Anthony Kenny," The Journal of Philosophy, vol. 79, no. 7 (July 1982), pp. 410–417.
- James F Ross, 1969, [review of] "Divine Science and the Science of God, by Victor Preller," Religious studies, vol. 5, no. 2 (December 1969), pp. 261–266.
- James F Ross, 1967, [review of] "The God We Seek, by Paul Weiss," The Philosophical Review, vol. 76, no. 2 (April 1967), pp. 255–257.
- James F Ross, 1965, [review of] "Charles Peirce and Scholastic Realism: A Study of Peirce's Relation to John Duns Scotus by John F. Boler," The Journal of Philosophy, vol. 62, no. 3 (February 4, 1965), pp. 80–83.
- James F Ross, 1962, "Reply," International Philosophical Quarterly, vol. 2, no. 4, pages 658 - 662.
- James F Ross, 1962, [review of] "The Logic of Analogy," International Philosophical Quarterly, vol. 2, no. 4, pp. 633–642, ISSN 0019-0365.
