= Kevin Flannery =

American Jesuit philosopher (born 1950)

The Reverend Kevin Flannery SJ
- Born: August 12, 1950 (age 76); Cleveland, Ohio, U.S.

Education
- Education: University of Oxford (DPhil)
- Thesis: The Logic of Alexander of Aphrodisias (1992)

Ecclesiastical career
- Religion: Christianity (Roman Catholic)
- Ordained: 6 June 1987

Fr. Kevin L. Flannery (born 12 August 1950, Cleveland, Ohio) is an American Catholic moral philosopher, author, and professor. He is emeritus professor of the history of ancient philosophy at the Pontifical Gregorian University. He entered the Society of Jesus in 1977. He has served as a consultor of the Sacred Congregation for the Doctrine of the Faith since 2002.

He has been a member of the Pontifical Academy of Saint Thomas Aquinas since 2004, and is a past-president of the American Catholic Philosophical Association. He was appointed as the holder of Creighton's Anna and Donald Waite Endowed Chair in Jesuit Education for the 2020–2021 academic year.

== Books ==
- Ways into the Logic of Alexander of Aphrodisias
- Christian and Moral Action and Action
- Action and Character According to Aristotle: The Logic of the Moral Life
- Cooperation with Evil: Thomistic Tools of Analysis.

CV: https://www.academia.edu/165356257/Cv_September_2025_Flannery
