= Étienne Gilson =

French historian and philosopher (1884–1978)

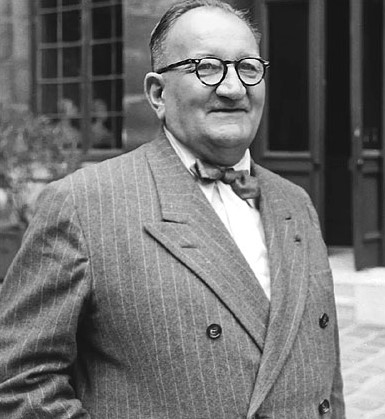
- Born: Étienne Henri Gilson; 13 June 1884; Paris, France
- Died: 19 September 1978 (aged 94); Auxerre, France
- Spouse: Thérèse Ravisé (m. 1908; died 1949)
- Children: 3

Education
- Education: University of Paris; Collège de France
- Doctoral advisor: Victor Delbos
- Other advisors: Henri Bergson; Lucien Lévy-Bruhl

Philosophical work
- Era: 20th-century philosophy
- Region: Western philosophy
- School: Thomism; Neo-scholasticism
- Institutions: University of Strasbourg; University of Paris; Collège de France; Pontifical Institute of Mediaeval Studies
- Doctoral students: Maurice de Gandillac; Anton Charles Pegis
- Notable students: Ferdinand Alquié; Vladimir Lossky; Richard McKeon
- Main interests: Theology, metaphysics, politics, literature, history of philosophy
- Notable ideas: The Thomistic distinction between being and essence Criticism of mathematicism

Étienne Henri Gilson (French: [ʒilsɔ̃]; 13 June 1884 – 19 September 1978) was a French Catholic philosopher and historian of philosophy. A scholar of medieval philosophy, he originally specialised in the thought of Descartes; he also philosophized in the "existential" tradition of Thomas Aquinas, although he did not consider himself a neo-Thomist philosopher. In 1946, he attained the distinction of being elected an "Immortal" (member) of the Académie française. He was nominated for the Nobel Prize in Literature.

In 2009, the International Étienne Gilson Society was created "to promote the thought of Étienne Gilson and classical philosophy in the academy and culture." It publishes a journal, Studia Gilsoniana.

== Biography ==
Born on 13 June 1884, in Paris, to a Roman Catholic family originally from Burgundy, Gilson attended the minor seminary at Notre-Dame-des-Champs, then finished his secondary education at the Lycée Henri IV. After finishing his military service, during which he began to read René Descartes, he studied for his licence (bachelor's degree), focusing on the influence of scholasticism on Cartesian thought. After studying at the Sorbonne under Victor Delbos (1862–1916), and Lucien Lévy-Bruhl and at the Collège de France under Henri Bergson, he finished his degree in philosophy in 1906.

In 1908, he married Thérèse Ravisé of Melun, and he taught in the high schools of Bourg-en-Bresse, Rochefort, Tours, Saint-Quentin and Angers. In 1913, while employed in teaching at the University of Lille, he defended his doctoral dissertation at the University of Paris on "Liberty in Descartes and Theology" ("La Liberté chez Descartes et la Théologie").

His career was interrupted by the outbreak of World War I, as he was drafted into the French Army as a sergeant. He served on the front and took part in the Battle of Verdun as second lieutenant. He was captured in February 1916 and spent two years in captivity. During this time he devoted himself to new areas of study, including the Russian language and St. Bonaventure. He was later awarded the Croix de Guerre for bravery in action.

In 1919, he became professor of the history of philosophy at the University of Strasbourg. From 1921 to 1932, he taught the history of medieval philosophy at the University of Paris. At the invitation of the Congregation of St. Basil, in 1929, he set up the Pontifical Institute of Medieval Studies in Toronto in conjunction with St. Michael's College at the University of Toronto, which now hosts an annual Étienne Gilson Lecture. He was elected to the American Academy of Arts and Sciences in 1929. As an internationally renowned thinker, Gilson was first, along with Jacques Maritain, to receive an honorary doctorate in philosophy from the Pontifical University of Saint Thomas Aquinas (Angelicum) in 1930.

He taught as a Visiting Professor of Philosophy at Indiana University from 1939 to 1940. He also taught for three years at Harvard. He was elected to the Académie française in 1946. In 1948, he was elected an International Member of the American Philosophical Society.

With the death of his wife, Thérèse Ravisé, on 12 November 1949, Gilson endured a considerable emotional shock.

In 1951, he relinquished his chair to Martial Gueroult at the Collège de France to devote himself completely to the Pontifical Institute of Mediaeval Studies until 1968. He knew the Jesuit theologian and cardinal Henri de Lubac. Their correspondence has been published. Although Gilson was primarily a historian of philosophy, he was also at the forefront of the 20th century revival of Thomism, along with Jacques Maritain. His work has received critical praise from Richard McKeon.

== Work ==
Gilson undertook an in-depth analysis of Thomism from a historical perspective. To Gilson, Thomism is certainly not identical with scholasticism in the pejorative sense, but rather a revolt against it. Gilson considered the philosophy of his own era to be deteriorating into a discipline which would signal humanity's abdication of the right to judge and rule nature, relegating humanity into a mere part of nature, which in turn would give the green light for the most reckless of social adventures to play havoc with human lives and institutions. Against "systems" of philosophy, Gilson was convinced that a revival of the philosophy of Thomas Aquinas would lead to the way out of that danger zone.

== Publications ==
- La Liberté chez Descartes et la Théologie, Alcan, 1913 (reprint: Vrin, 1982).
- Index scolastico-cartésien , Alcan, 1913 (second revised edition: Vrin, 1979).
- Le thomisme, introduction au système de saint Thomas, Vrin, 1919. Chapter from English translation on Faith & Reason.
- Études de philosophie médiévale, Université de Strasbourg, 1921.
- La philosophie au moyen-âge, vol.I : De Scot Erigène à saint Bonaventure, Payot, 1922.
- La philosophie au moyen-âge, vol.II : De saint Thomas d'Aquin à Guillaume d'Occam, Payot, 1922.
- La philosophie de saint Bonaventure, Vrin, 1924.
- René Descartes. Discours de la méthode, texte et commentaire, Vrin, 1925.
- Saint Thomas d'Aquin, Gabalda, 1925.
- Introduction à l'étude de Saint Augustin, Vrin, 1929.
- Études sur le rôle de la pensée médiévale dans la formation du système cartésien, Vrin, 1930.
- L'esprit de la philosophie médiévale, Vrin, 1932.
- Les Idées et les Lettres, Vrin, 1932.
- Pour un ordre catholique, Desclée de Brouwer, 1934.
- La théologie mystique de saint Bernard, Vrin, 1934.
- Le réalisme méthodique, Téqui, 1935.
- Christianisme et philosophie, Vrin, 1936.
- The Unity of Philosophical Experience, Scribner's, 1937.
- Héloïse et Abélard, Vrin, 1938.
- Dante et la philosophie, Vrin, 1939.
- Réalisme thomiste et critique de la connaissance, Vrin, 1939.
- God and Philosophy, 1941.
- Théologie et histoire de la spiritualité, Vrin, 1943.
- Notre démocratie, S.E.R.P., 1947.
- L'être et l'essence, Vrin, 1948.
- Saint Bernard, textes choisis et présentés, Plon, 1949.
- Being and Some Philosophers (Toronto: Pontifical Institute of Medieval Studies, 1952)
- L'École des Muses, Vrin, 1951.
- Jean Duns Scot, introduction à ses positions fondamentales, Vrin, 1952.
- Les métamorphoses de la cité de Dieu, Vrin, 1952.
- Being and Some Philosophers, 2nd ed. (Toronto: Pontifical Institute of Medieval Studies, 1952)
- History of Christian Philosophy in the Middle Ages (London: Sheed and Ward, 1955)
- Peinture et réalité, Vrin, 1958.
- Le Philosophe et la Théologie, Fayard, 1960.
- Introduction à la philosophie chrétienne, Vrin, 1960.
- La paix de la sagesse, Aquinas, 1960.
- Trois leçons sur le problème de l'existence de Dieu, Divinitas, 1961.
- L'être et Dieu, Revue thomiste, 1962.
- Introduction aux arts du Beau, Vrin, 1963.
- The Spirit of Thomism, 1964.
- Matières et formes, Vrin, 1965.
- Les tribulations de Sophie, Vrin, 1967.
- La société de masse et sa culture, Vrin, 1967.
- Hommage à Bergson, Vrin, 1967.
- Linguistique et philosophie, Vrin, 1969.
- D'Aristote à Darwin et retour, Vrin, 1971.
- Dante et Béatrice, études dantesques, Vrin, 1974.
- Saint Thomas moraliste, Vrin, 1974.
- L'athéisme difficile, Vrin, 1979

=== Translations ===
- The Philosophy of St Thomas Aquinas, edited by G. A. Elrington, translated by Edward Bullough (Cambridge: W. Heffer, 1924)
- The Spirit of Mediaeval Philosophy, translated by A. H. C. Downes (London: Sheed and Ward, 1936)
- Reason and Revelation in the Middle Ages (New York: Charles Scribner's Sons, 1939)
- The Mystical Theology of Saint Bernard, translated by A. H. C. Downes (London: Sheed and Ward, 1940)
- The Philosophy of St Bonaventure, translated by Illtyd Trethowan and F. J. Sheed (London: Sheed and Ward, 1940)
- History of Philosophy and Philosophical Education, Marquette University Press, 1948.
- Dante the Philosopher, translated by David Moore (London: Sheed and Ward, 1952)
- Choir of Muses, translated by Maisie Ward (London: Sheed and Ward, 1953)
- The Christian Philosophy of St Thomas Aquinas, translated by L. K. Shook (London: Gollancz, 1957)
- Gilson's "Painting and Reality" (1957), was also published in English.
- The Christian Philosophy of Saint Augustine translated by L. E. M. Lynch (New York: Random House, 1960)
- Heloise and Abelard (Ann Arbor, Mich.: University of Michigan Press, 1960)
- Moral Values and the Moral Life:The Ethical Theory of St. Thomas Aquinas(The Shoestring Press Inc. 1961)
- The Philosopher and Theology (Translated from the French by Cecile Gilson, Imprint, New York: Random House, 1962)
- The Arts of the Beautiful (New York: Charles Scribner's Sons, 1965)
- From Aristotle to Darwin and Back Again, Translated by J. Lyon, (Notre Dame: University of Notre Dame Press, 1984)
- The Terrors of the Year Two Thousand, University of St. Michael's College, 1984.
- Christian Philosophy: An Introduction, translated by Armand Maurer (Toronto: Pontifical Institute of Medieval Studies, 1993)
- The Metamorphoses of the City of God, translated by James G. Colbert (Washington: The Catholic University of America Press, 2020)
- Gilson, Étienne (2019). History of Christian Philosophy in the Middle Ages. Washington, DC.: Catholic University of America Press. ISBN 978-1952826566.
- Gilson, Étienne; Langan, Thomas (2021). Modern Philosophy: From Descartes to Kant. Rhode Island: Cluny Press. ISBN 978-1952826566.

== See also ==
- Philotheus Boehner
- John F. X. Knasas
