= Pontifical Institute of Mediaeval Studies =

Research institute affiliated with St. Michael's College, Toronto

- Latin: Pontificum institutum studiorum Mediae Aetatis
- Other name: PIMS
- Type: Pontifical university, research institute
- Established: 1929
- Founder: Étienne Gilson
- Religious affiliation: Roman Catholic
- Academic affiliations: St. Michael's College, University of Toronto
- Chancellor: Francis Leo, T.O.P.
- President: Augustine Thompson, O.P.
- Location: 59 Queen's Park Crescent East, Toronto, Ontario, M5S 2C4, Canada; 43.6656°N 79.3910°W
- Campus: Urban
- Colours
- Website: pims.ca

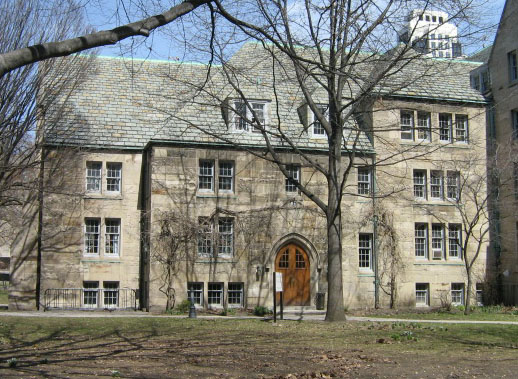
Main building at St Michael's College

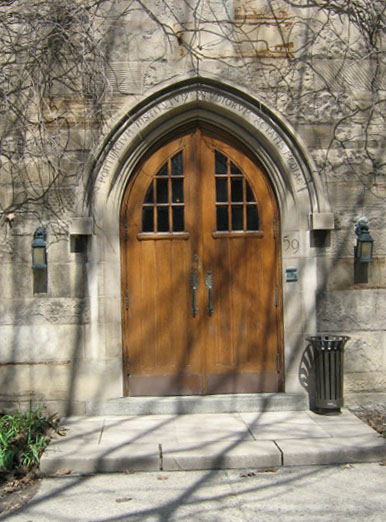
Main entrance of the institute

The Pontifical Institute of Mediaeval Studies (PIMS) is a research institute in the University of Toronto that is dedicated to advanced studies in the culture of the Middle Ages.

== Governance ==
The Roman Catholic Archbishop of Toronto, currently Francis Leo, T.O.P., acts as the chancellor of the institute. The Praeses (or president) of the institute is Augustine Thompson, O.P.

== History ==
It was founded in 1929 as the Institute of Mediaeval Studies at St. Michael's College of the University of Toronto. Étienne Gilson, then of the Sorbonne, was instrumental in its foundation, along with Henry Carr and Edmund J. McCorkell of the Congregation of St. Basil and St. Michael's College. In 1939 it was granted a pontifical charter by Pope Pius XII, by which it was given the power to grant licenciate and doctorate degrees in medieval studies.

In 1964 the University of Toronto established the Centre for Medieval Studies as part of the School of Graduate Studies, for students pursuing a master's degree or doctorate in medieval studies. Teaching at these levels gradually passed from the institute to the centre. (The centre officially uses the spelling "medieval" while PIMS uses "mediaeval".) Students of the Centre for Medieval Studies have access to the PIMS building and library.

Up until 1958 the institute had its own charter. From 1958 to 2005, PIMS was a division of the University of St. Michael's College. The Pontifical Institute of Mediaeval Studies Act of 2005 gave the institute academic autonomy from the university, with which, however, it remains affiliated. Under the act, PIMS is administered by a board of governors with its academic affairs vested in the Institute Council of the academic staff, consisting of fellows and associate fellows.

== Postdoctoral Program and Licentiate in Mediaeval Studies ==
In 1998 the institute became an exclusively postdoctoral research centre, and it accepts students who have recently completed their doctoral studies and wish to conduct specialized research in medieval studies. PIMS offers a Licentiate in Mediaeval Studies (LMS) as a degree exclusively for students who have completed their postdoctoral studies there. Unusually for a Pontifical licentiate, the degree is awarded after its bearer has already earned a doctorate, and not on the way to such.

== Étienne Gilson Lecture ==
Since 1979 the institute has hosted an annual lecture from "a senior medievalist" in honour of its co-founder and his research interests. Previous lecturers include Jaroslav Pelikan, Mark D. Jordan, John F. Wippel, Peter Brown, and Francis Oakley. Lectures have been given on topics such as medieval philosophy, medieval art, medicine in the Middle Ages, and medieval historiography.

== Library ==
The institute has its own library with over 150,000 volumes, one of the largest collections of medieval documentation in North America. The library is part of the larger system of the University of Toronto Libraries. The library contains over 9,000 reels of microfilm and over 60,000 slides. Materials are non-circulating, and use of the library is generally restricted to PIMS and Centre for Medieval Studies faculty, researchers, and graduate students, though visitor passes may be obtained by contacting the library itself.

== Publishing ==
PIMS also has an extensive publishing program that includes its annual journal of research on the Middle Ages, Mediaeval Studies, which began in 1939. In 2004, it had reached the 66th volume. A collection of Gilson Lectures focusing on Thomas Aquinas was published in 2008.

== Faculty and fellows ==
Faculty and research fellows, visiting and otherwise, associated with PIMS have included:

- Leonard Boyle (1923–1999), sometime Prefect of the Vatican Library
- Osmund Lewry (1929–1987), intellectual historian, specializing in philosophy
- Jacques Maritain (1882–1973), French Catholic philosopher
- John Marenbon (b. 1955), scholar of medieval philosophy
- Joseph Owens (1908–2005), scholar of scholastic philosophy
- Anton Charles Pegis (1905–1978), Thomist philosopher and historian of philosophy
- C. J. Ryan (1943–2004), Italian studies scholar
