= Analytic theology =

Application of analytic philosophy to theology

Analytic theology (AT) is a body of primarily Christian theological literature resulting from the application of the methods and concepts of late-twentieth-century analytic philosophy.

Analytic theology is related to the philosophy of religion. Given the types of historical philosophy that have funded the analytic philosophy of religion, theologians are frequently involved in retrieval theology as they re-appropriate and modify older Christian solutions to theological questions. Analytic theology has strong roots in the Anglo-American analytic philosophy of religion in the last quarter of the twentieth century, as well as similarities at times to scholastic approaches to theology.

== Definition ==
Historically and methodologically, AT is both a way of approaching theological works as well as a sociological or historical shift in academic theology. AT can be identified by its analytic method; its focus on a wider range of theological topics than the philosophy of religion; and an engagement with the wider analytic philosophical or theological literature for concepts. Ideas such as speech-act theory or possible world semantics have been applied to theological questions involving divine revelation or foreknowledge.

When understood more 'widely', analytic theology is a method to be applied to theological works. Muslims, Jews and Christians could all apply the same analytic methods to their theological work. William Wood has called this the "formal model" of analytic theology. By contrast, some wonder if analytic theology is forwarding certain theological beliefs. In contrast to the formal method, Wood calls this the "substantive model" of analytic theology.

=== Differences to other disciplines ===
In a 2013 article of the Journal of the American Academy of Religion, Andrew Chignell notes that some of the reviewers and writers in the 2009 Analytic Theology edited volume wondered what the difference, if any, was between analytic theology and philosophical theology. Similarly, Max Baker-Hytch, a philosopher of religion, asked what the difference between AT and the analytic philosophy of religion was in an article in the Journal of Analytic Theology.

The difference between AT and systematic theology is currently under debate. William Abraham argues that AT is systematic theology and that it was only a matter of time before something like AT took root in the theological world. Oliver Crisp has published an article demonstrating how analytic theology could qualify itself as systematic theology. Oliver Crisp cites leading theologians to demonstrate that there is no agreed upon definition for systematic theology. He shows how AT shares a common task and goals with systematic theology.

=== As a theological method ===
Due to its similarities to philosophical theology and philosophy of religion and overlap with analytic philosophy, defining analytic theology remains a challenge. Systematic theologian William J. Abraham defined analytic theology as "systematic theology attuned to the deployment of the skills, resources, and virtues of analytic philosophy. It is the articulation of the central themes of Christian teaching illuminated by the best insights of analytic philosophy."

Philosopher Michael Rea defines analytic theology as activities of approaching theological topics that involve "style that conforms to the prescriptions that are distinctive of analytic philosophical discourse", such as following the jargons of analytic philosophy. An effort to tentatively illustrate some rhetorical features that characterized analytic philosophy was made by Rea in the introduction to Analytic Theology. Imagine, for example, that a theologian writes that Jesus's cry of dereliction from the cross indicates that the Trinity was broken or ruptured mysteriously during Jesus's crucifixion. An analytic theologian might ask for what "broken" denotes given its connotations when used about the God of Christianity. The analytic theologian might turn to the history in search of concepts that help her speak about Christ being "forsaken" by God.

Cambridge theologian Sarah Coakley, by contrast, warns that attempts to set down an essentialist definition for analytic theology will distract from the productive work of AT.

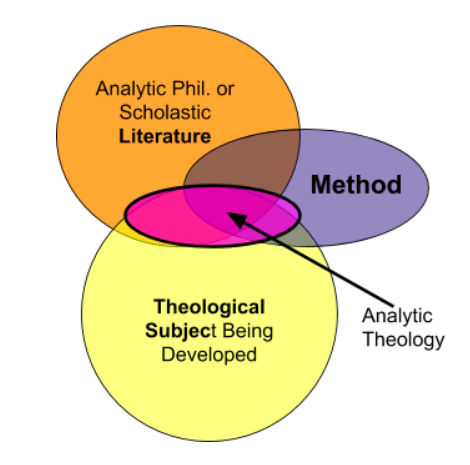
A Venn diagram showing topics covered by analytic theology

=== Sociologically and historically ===
Andrew Chignell has offered a different definition of AT: "Analytic theology is a new, concerted, and well-funded effort on the part of philosophers of religion, theologians, and religion scholars to re-engage and learn from one another, instead of allowing historical, institutional, and stylistic barriers to keep them apart." Chignell mentions at least two edited volumes that attempted to bring together philosophers, theologians and scholars of religion to work on questions they had in common.

== History ==
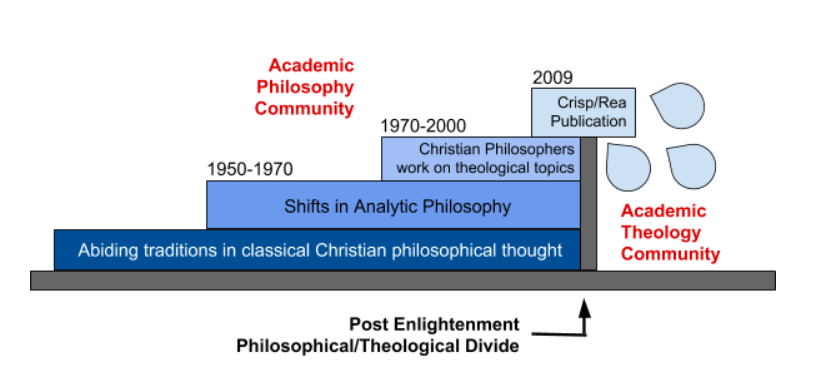
Diagram demarcating historical periods leading to the development of AT

Contemporary AT, represented by scholars like Oliver Crisp and Michael Rea, has its roots in mid-twentieth-century responses by Christian philosophers to challenges of religious epistemology and religious language about God, and then a turn by Christian philosophers to work on more traditionally theological topics. In Medieval Europe, a tradition of philosophical thought of theology was brought into decline by the philosophy of Immanuel Kant and the theology of Friedrich Schleiermacher.

=== 1950s ===
By the 1950s, the conversation mostly shifted to require speakers to show why theological or philosophical claims were true or false. According to Nicholas Wolterstorff, the demise of logical positivism also had the effect of casting doubt over other attempts, such as those of Kant or the logical positivists, to point out a deep epistemological boundary between the knowable and unknowable. Wolterstorff also suggests that classical foundationalism collapsed as the theory of epistemology in philosophy, but it was not replaced by an alternative theory. What has resulted was an environment of dialogical pluralism where no major epistemological framework is widely held.

In this context of dialogical pluralism, two mechanisms for justifying holding a belief became popular: reformed epistemology and evidentialist approaches that made use of Bayesian probability.

=== 1970s to present ===
In 1978, the Society of Christian Philosophers was formed. Six years later, Alvin Plantinga delivered his presidential addresses, "Advice to Christian Philosophers", in which he signaled the need for Christian philosophers to do more than follow the assumptions and approaches to philosophy accepted in the wider field, given that many of those assumptions were antithetical to Christianity.

In the 1980s and 1990s, the production of literature by Christian philosophers became more about treating theological topics such as the attributes of God and atonement by scholars like Richard Swinburne and his fellow Orielense David Brown. According to Swinburne, Brown's book, The Divine Trinity, was "the first book in the 'analytic' philosophy of religion tradition to analyse a central Christian doctrine". Both Oliver Crisp and Michael Rea found that philosophers and theologians were not sharing resources as late as the mid-2000s.

It was with the publication of Analytic Theology that AT began to garner attention in philosophical and theological circles. In 2012, a session at the American Academy of Religion (AAR) was dedicated to discussing the volume, followed by several articles in volume 81 of the Journal of the American Academy of Religion. In 2013, the Journal of Analytic Theology was first published.

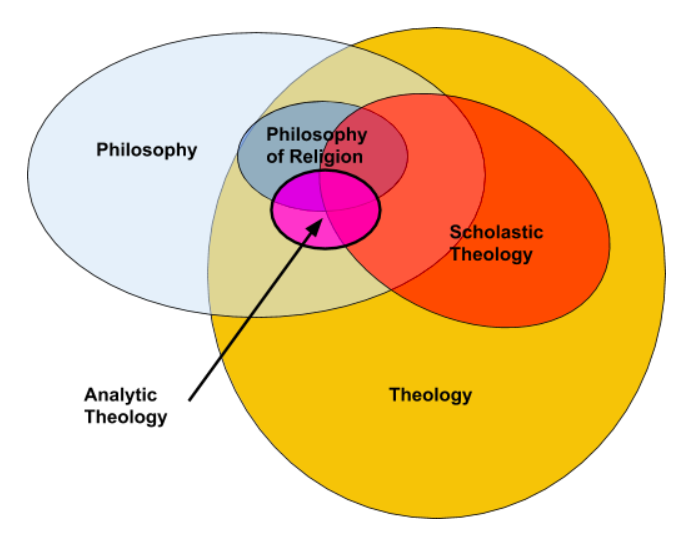
A Venn diagram illustrating the scope of AT within various disciplines

== Projects ==
There are several centers of study where analytic theology is being worked on in a departmental setting, including the Fuller Theological Seminary, the Logos Institute at St. Andrews University, the Center for Philosophy of Religion at the University of Notre Dame, Oriel College at Oxford and the University of Innsbruck.

The John Templeton Foundation had funded analytic theology-type projects in North America, at the University of Notre Dame's Center for Philosophy of Religion; in Europe, at the Munich School of Philosophy and University of Innsbruck; and in the Middle East, at the Shalem Center and then later the Herzl Institute in Jerusalem. More recent Templeton-funded initiatives include a three-year project at Fuller Theological Seminary in California and the establishment of the Logos Institute for Analytic and Exegetical Theology at the University of St. Andrews, Scotland.

== See also ==
- Analytical Thomism
- Dogmatic theology
- Philosophy of religion
- Philosophical theology
- Systematic theology

== Bibliography ==
- Abraham, W. J. (2012). Analytic theology: A bibliography. Highland Loch Press.
- Weston, P. (2025). Introducing Analytic Theology. United Kingdom: SCM Press.
- Wood, W. (2021). Analytic Theology and the Academic Study of Religion. United Kingdom: Oxford University Press.
