= Oliver D. Crisp =

English theologian

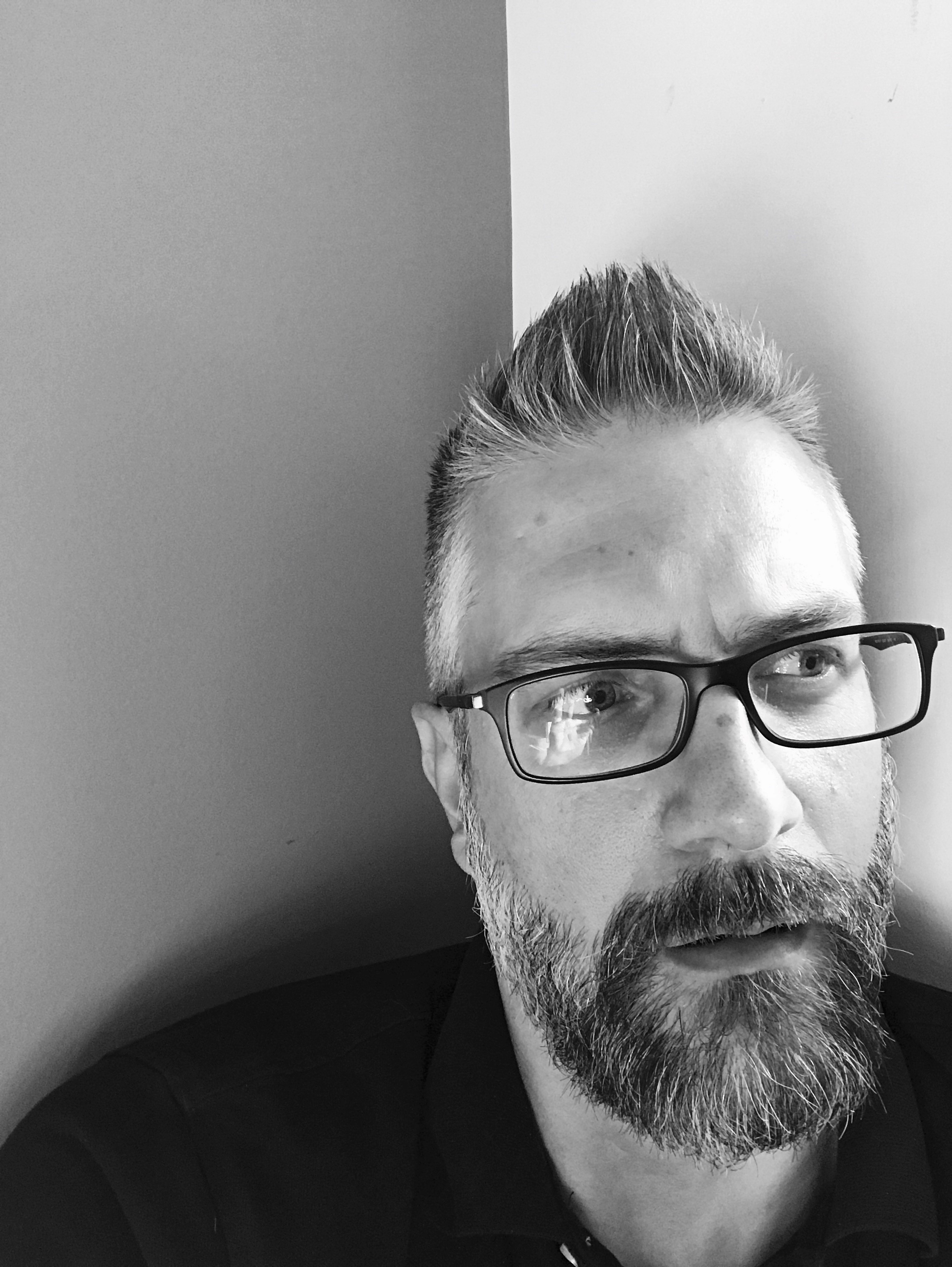
- Born: 11 August 1972 (age 54)

Academic background
- Education: University of Aberdeen; King’s College, London
- Thesis: The Metaphysics of Sin in the Philosophical Theology of Jonathan Edwards (2002)
- Doctoral advisor: Paul Helm
- Other advisor: David Fergusson

Academic work
- Discipline: Theology
- Sub-discipline: Christology; hamartiology; historical theology; philosophical theology; systematic theology
- School or tradition: Analytic theology; Calvinism; evangelicalism
- Institutions: University of Bristol; Fuller Theological Seminary; University of St Andrews

Oliver D. Crisp (born 1972) is a British theologian who currently works as Professor of Analytic Theology at the University of St Andrews, and was formerly a professor of systematic theology at Fuller Theological Seminary in Pasadena, California.

Crisp was, until 2011, a reader in philosophical theology at Bristol University in the United Kingdom. He specializes in analytic theology, philosophical theology, and historical theology. His historical work focuses on eighteenth- and nineteenth-century American Reformed theologians, including Jonathan Edwards and William Shedd. His constructive work has, to date, primarily been in the areas of Christology, soteriology, and hamartiology. Along with Michael Rea, Crisp has been involved in a rising trend among growing number of theologians known as analytic theology. As part of this ongoing initiative Crisp and Rea founded the Journal of Analytic Theology in 2013.

Simultaneously, he worked with Fred Sanders to start the LA Theology Conference in 2013, completing the ninth conference in 2023.

Crisp earned his Bachelor of Divinity, Master of Theology, and Master of Laws degrees from the University of Aberdeen. He received his Doctor of Philosophy degree from King's College, London, in 2002. His thesis focused on the philosophical theology of Jonathan Edwards and was supervised by Paul Helm. In 2016, Crisp was awarded a Doctor of Letters degree from the University of Aberdeen.

He is the author or editor of thirty eight books, and has written over a hundred articles, chapters, and essays in theology and philosophy. The covers of Crisp's singly authored works often feature his own artwork. (See for example the cover of Deviant Calvinism.)

== Selected works ==
=== Books ===
- Participation and Atonement: An Analytic and Constructive Account by Oliver D. Crisp; Grand Rapids, MI: Baker Academic, 2022. ISBN 978-0801049965
- Freedom, Redemption and Communion: Studies in Christian Doctrine by Oliver D. Crisp; London: T&T Clark, 2021. ISBN 978-0567698346
- God, Creation and Salvation: Essays in Reformed Theology by Oliver D. Crisp; London: T&T Clark, 2020. ISBN 978-0567689535
- Approaching the Atonement: The Reconciling Work of Christ by Oliver D. Crisp; Downers Grove, Ill: IVP Academic, 2020. ISBN 978-0830851973
- Analyzing Doctrine: Toward a Systematic Theology by Oliver D. Crisp; Waco, TX: Baylor University Press, 2019. ISBN 978-1481309868
- Jonathan Edwards: An Introduction to his Thought by Oliver D. Crisp and Kyle C. Strobel; Grand Rapids: Eerdmans, 2018. ISBN 978-0802872692
- Saving Calvinism: Expanding the Reformed Tradition by Oliver D. Crisp; Downers Grove, Ill: IVP Academic, 2016. ISBN 978-0830851751
- The Word Enfleshed: Exploring the Person and Work of Christ by Oliver D. Crisp; Grand Rapids: Baker Academic, 2016. ISBN 978-0801098093
- Jonathan Edwards Among the Theologians by Oliver D. Crisp; Grand Rapids: Eerdmans, 2015. ISBN 978-0802871725
- Deviant Calvinism: Broadening Reformed Theology by Oliver D. Crisp; Fortress Press, 1 September 2014 ISBN 1451486138
- Jonathan Edwards on God and Creation by Oliver D. Crisp; New York: Oxford University Press, 2012. ISBN 978-0199755295
- Retrieving Doctrine: Essays in Reformed Theology by Oliver D. Crisp; Downers Grove, Ill; IVP Academic, 2011. ISBN 978-0830839285
- Revisioning Christology: Theology in the Reformed Tradition by Oliver Crisp; Farnham: Ashgate, 2011. ISBN 978-1-4094-3005-6
- God Incarnate: Explorations in Christology by Oliver Crisp; New York: T & T Clark, 2009. ISBN 978-0-567-03348-2
- A Reader in Contemporary Philosophical Theology edited by Oliver Crisp; New York: T & T Clark, 2009. ISBN 978-0-567-03146-4
- Analytic Theology: New Essays in the Philosophy of Theology, edited by Oliver Crisp and Michael Rea; New York: Oxford University Press, 2009. ISBN 978-0-19-960042-7
- Divinity and Humanity: The Incarnation Reconsidered by Oliver Crisp. Cambridge: Cambridge University Press, 2007. ISBN 978-0-521-69535-0
- An American Augustinian: Sin and Salvation in the Dogmatic Theology of William G. T. Shedd by Oliver Crisp; Eugene, OR: Wipf & Stock, 2007. ISBN 978-1-84227-526-9
- Jonathan Edwards and the Metaphysics of Sin by Oliver Crisp; Burlington, VT: Ashgate Pub, 2005. ISBN 978-0-7546-3896-4
