= Marilyn McCord Adams =

American philosopher and priest (1943–2017)

The Reverend Marilyn McCord Adams
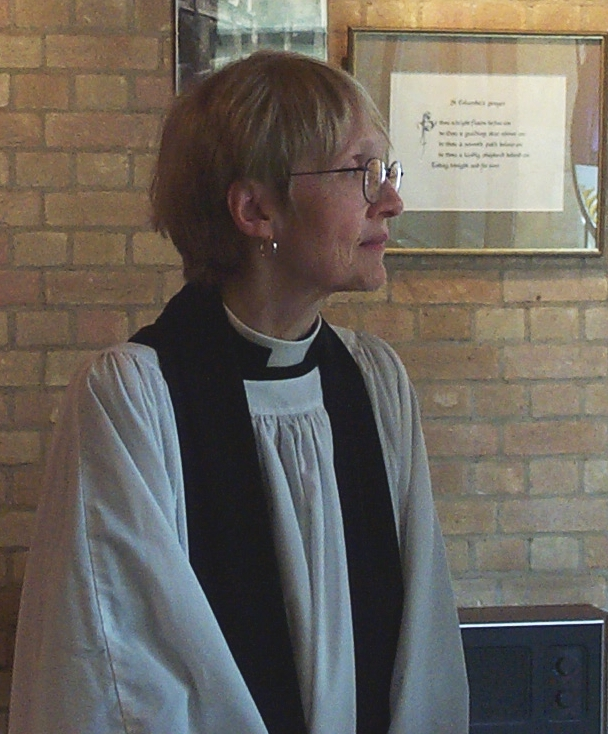
- Adams in 2006
- Born: Marilyn McCord; October 12, 1943; Oak Park, Illinois, U.S.
- Died: March 22, 2017 (aged 73); Princeton, New Jersey, U.S.
- Spouse: Robert Merrihew Adams (m. 1966)

Academic background
- Education: University of Illinois; Cornell University; Princeton Theological Seminary
- Thesis: The Problem of God's Foreknowledge and Free Will in Boethius and William Ockham (1967)

Academic work
- Discipline: Philosophy
- Sub-discipline: Philosophy of religion; philosophical theology; metaphysics; medieval philosophy; Christology
- School or tradition: Analytic philosophy
- Institutions: University of California, Los Angeles; Yale University; Christ Church, Oxford
- Main interests: Theodicy
- Notable works: Horrendous Evils and the Goodness of God (1999); Christ and Horrors (2006)
- Influenced: Christine Helmer

Ecclesiastical career
- Religion: Christianity (Anglican)
- Church: Episcopal Church (United States); Church of England
- Ordained: 1987 (deacon · priest)

Marilyn McCord Adams (October 12, 1943 – March 22, 2017) was an American philosopher and Episcopal priest. She specialized in the philosophy of religion, philosophical theology, and medieval philosophy. She was Horace Tracy Pitkin Professor of Historical Theology at Yale Divinity School from 1998 to 2003 and Regius Professor of Divinity at the University of Oxford from 2004 to 2009.

== Early life and education ==
Adams was born on October 12, 1943, in Oak Park, Illinois, United States. She was the daughter of William Clark McCord and Wilmah Brown McCord. In 1966, she married the philosopher Robert Merrihew Adams.

Adams was educated at the University of Illinois at Urbana–Champaign, graduating with a Bachelor of Arts (AB) degree. She continued her studies at Cornell University, completing her Doctor of Philosophy (PhD) degree in 1967. She undertook studies and training for ordained ministry at Princeton Theological Seminary, graduating with a Master of Theology degree in 1984. She was awarded a Doctor of Divinity (DD) degree by the University of Oxford in 2008, thereby becoming the first woman to become an Oxford DD.

== Career ==
=== Academic career ===
Adams spent the majority of her academic career at the University of California, Los Angeles: she was an associate professor (1972–1978) and then professor of philosophy from 1978 to 1993, and chair of the Department of Philosophy between 1985 and 1987. She was President of the Society for Medieval and Renaissance Philosophy from 1980 to 1982. Having moved to Yale University, she was professor of historical theology from 1993 to 2003 and the Horace Tracy Pitkin Professor of Historical Theology at Yale Divinity School from 1998 to 2003.

In 2004, Adams moved to England where she had been appointed Regius Professor of Divinity at the University of Oxford. The chair is linked to a canonry at Christ Church Cathedral, Oxford, and so she also became a residentiary canon. She was the first woman and the first American to be appointed the Regius Professor of Divinity at Oxford. In 2009, after five years abroad, she returned to the United States to join the University of North Carolina at Chapel Hill as a distinguished research professor of philosophy. She moved to Rutgers University, where she was a visiting/distinguished research professor from 2013 to 2015.

Adams was elected a Fellow of the American Academy of Arts and Sciences in 2015.

Adams was a cofounder and president of the Society of Christian Philosophers.

=== Ordained ministry ===
Adams was ordained as a deacon and priest in the Episcopal Church (United States) in 1987. She served at parish churches in Los Angeles, New Haven, Connecticut, Chapel Hill, North Carolina, and Trenton, New Jersey. From 2004 to 2009, she served as a residentiary canon of Christ Church Cathedral, Oxford. During that time, she was elected as a university representative to the General Synod of the Church of England.

== Work and writing ==
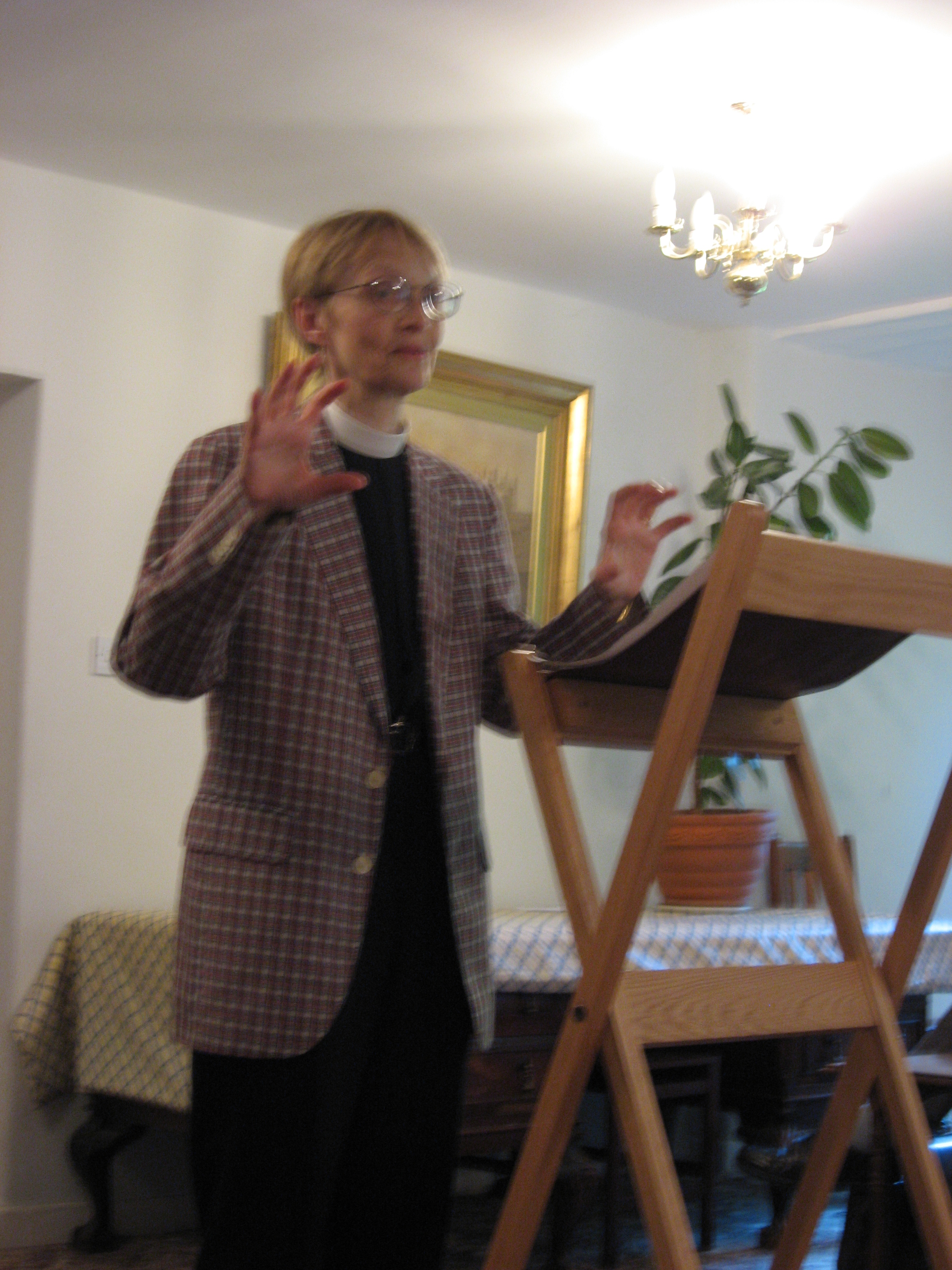
Adams speaking in 2007

Adams' work in philosophy focused on the philosophy of religion, especially the problem of evil, philosophical theology, metaphysics, and medieval philosophy. Her work on the problem of evil largely focused on what she calls "horrendous evils". She was an avowed Christian universalist, believing that ultimately all will receive salvation and restoration in Christ:

Traditional doctrines of hell err again by supposing either that God does not get what God wants with every human being ("God wills all humans to be saved" by God's antecedent will) or that God deliberately creates some for ruin. To be sure, many human beings have conducted their ante-mortem lives in such a way as to become anti-social persons. Almost none of us dies with all the virtues needed to be fit for heaven. Traditional doctrines of hell suppose that God lacks the will or the patience or the resourcefulness to civilize each and all of us, to rear each and all of us up into the household of God. They conclude that God is left with the option of merely human penal systems – viz., liquidation or quarantine!

== Personal life ==
In 1966, Marilyn McCord married Robert Merrihew Adams.

Adams died on March 22, 2017, in Princeton, New Jersey, aged 73; she had cancer.

== Works ==
- Adams, Marilyn McCord. "Is the Existence of God a 'Hard' Fact?". The Philosophical Review Vol. LXXVI, No. 4 (October 1967) 492-503.
- Adams, Marilyn McCord, trans. Paul of Venice, On the Truth and Falsity of Propositions and On the Significatum of a Proposition, ed. Francesco del Punta. London: Oxford University Press for the British Academy, 1977.
- Adams, Marilyn McCord and Norman Kretzman, eds. and trans. William Ockham's Predestination, God's Foreknowledge, and Future Contingents. 2nd ed. Indianapolis, Indiana: Hackett, 1983.
- Adams, Marilyn McCord. William of Ockham (2 vols.) Notre Dame, Indiana: Notre Dame University Press, 1987. ISBN 0-268-01945-2
- Adams, Marilyn McCord, and Robert Merrihew Adams, eds. The Problem of Evil. Oxford: Oxford University Press, 1990.
- Adams, Marilyn McCord. Horrendous Evils and the Goodness of God. Ithaca: Cornell University Press, 1999. ISBN 0-8014-8686-6.
- Adams, Marilyn McCord. "What Sort of Human Nature? Medieval Philosophy and the Systematics of Christology" (Aquinas Lecture 1999). Milwaukee: Marquette University Press, 1999.
- Adams, Marilyn McCord. Christ and Horrors: The Coherence of Christology. Based on the Gifford Lectures for 1998–1999. Cambridge: Cambridge University Press, 2006. ISBN 0-521-68600-8
- Adams, Marilyn McCord. Some Later Medieval Theories of the Eucharist: Thomas Aquinas, Giles of Rome, Duns Scotus, and William Ockham. New York: Oxford University Press, 2010.
- Adams, Marilyn McCord. "Mark 1:9–15: Theological Perspective" in Feasting on the Word: Preaching the Revised Common Lectionary: Year B, Volume 2; David l. Bartlett and Barbara Brown Taylor, General Editors; Copyright 2008 Westminster John Knox Press. See

== See also ==
- Faculty of Theology and Religion, University of Oxford
- List of American philosophers

Academic offices
Preceded by Robert Merrihew Adams	Gifford Lecturer at the University of St Andrews; 1999	Succeeded by Stanley Hauerwas
Preceded by Keith Ward	Regius Professor of Divinity at the University of Oxford; 2004–2009	Succeeded by Graham Ward
Professional and academic associations
Preceded by Arthur Hyman	President of the Society for Medieval and Renaissance Philosophy; 1980–1982	Succeeded by John F. Wippel
Preceded by Alvin Plantinga	President of the Society of Christian Philosophers; 1986–1989	Succeeded by George I. Mavrodes
