= Michael Bergmann (philosopher) =

American analytic philosopher

- Born: Michael Abram Bergmann; 1964 (age 61–62)
- Other name: Mike Bergmann

Academic background
- Education: University of Waterloo; University of Notre Dame

Academic work
- Discipline: Philosophy
- Sub-discipline: Epistemology; metaphysics; philosophy of religion
- School or tradition: Analytic philosophy; Christianity; skeptical theism
- Institutions: Purdue University
- Main interests: Externalism; problem of evil; religious epistemology

Michael Abram Bergmann (born 1964) is an American analytic philosopher teaching in the department of philosophy at Purdue University. His primary interests are epistemology and philosophy of religion. In epistemology, he writes mostly on externalism and, in philosophy of religion, he mostly writes on the epistemology of religious belief and the problem of evil.

== Biography ==
Born in 1964, Bergmann received Bachelor of Arts and Master of Arts degrees in philosophy from the University of Waterloo and, in 1997, a PhD from the University of Notre Dame. He has taught at Purdue University since 1997. Bergmann was the president of the Society of Christian Philosophers from 2016 to 2019.

== Philosophical work ==
In his early work, Bergmann wrote about Alvin Plantinga's evolutionary argument against naturalism. He raised objections inspired by Thomas Reid's epistemology. In philosophy of religion, Bergmann, along with other philosophers, developed skeptical theism, a position which addresses the evidential argument from evil formulated by William L. Rowe. With Michael Rea and Michael Murray, he edited the book Divine Evil? The Moral Character of the God of Abraham (Oxford University Press, 2010). Furthermore, he is also a co-editor of Challenges to Moral and Religious Belief: Disagreement and Evolution (Oxford University Press, 2014) together with Patrick Kain, Reason and Faith: Themes from Richard Swinburne (Oxford University Press, 2016) together with Jeffrey E. Brower, and Intellectual Assurance: Essays on Traditional Epistemic Internalism (Oxford University Press, 2016) together with Brett Coppenger.

In epistemology, Bergmann defends externalism.

== Works ==
- Justification Without Awareness: A Defense of Epistemic Externalism, Oxford University Press, 2006.
- Radical Skepticism and Epistemic Intuition, Oxford University Press, 2021.

Professional and academic associations
| Preceded by Michael Rea | President of the Society of Christian Philosophers; 2016–2019 | Succeeded by Terence Cuneo |
