= William J. Abraham =

Northern Irish theologian (1947–2021)

The Reverend William J. Abraham
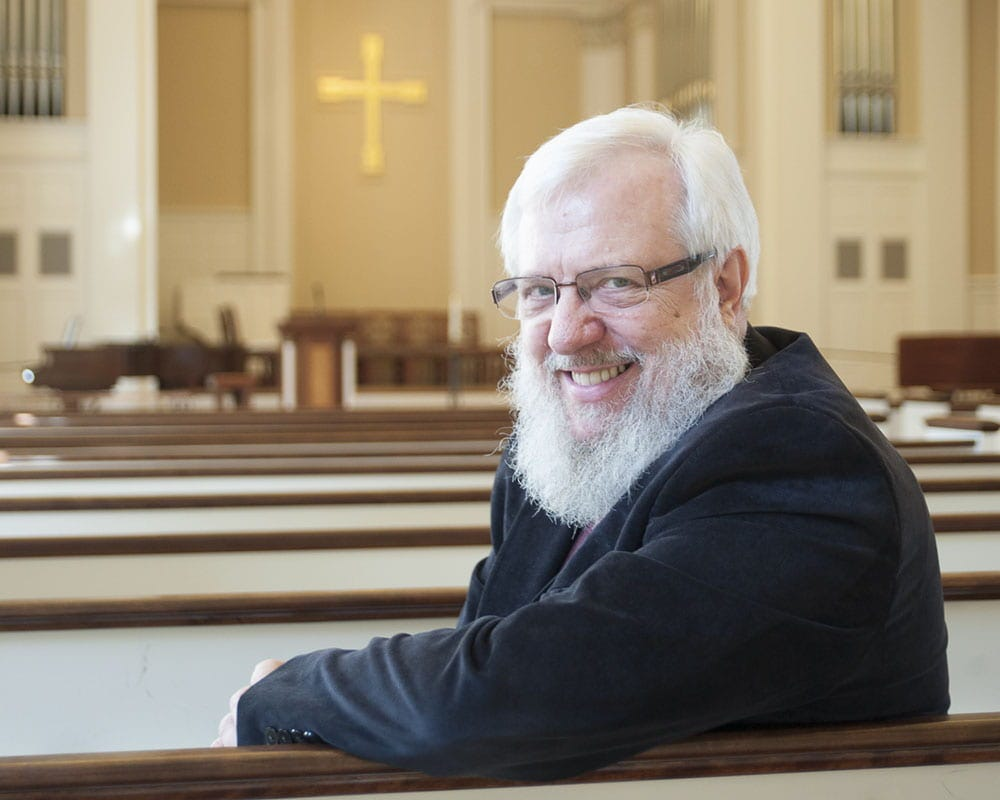
- The theologian in chapel
- Born: 19 December 1947; Belfast, Northern Ireland
- Died: 7 October 2021 (aged 73); Dallas, Texas

Academic background
- Education: Queen's University Belfast; Asbury Theological Seminary; Regent's Park College, Oxford
- Thesis: Divine Action and History (1977)

Academic work
- Discipline: Philosophy; theology
- Sub-discipline: Applied theology; epistemology; philosophical theology; philosophy of religion
- School or tradition: Analytic philosophy; analytic theology; evangelicalism
- Institutions: Seattle Pacific University; Southern Methodist University
- Notable ideas: Canonical theism

Ecclesiastical career
- Religion: Christianity (Methodist)
- Church: Methodist Church in Ireland; United Methodist Church

William James Abraham (19 December 1947 – 7 October 2021) was a Northern Irish theologian, analytic philosopher, and Methodist pastor known for his contributions to the philosophy of religion, religious epistemology, evangelism, and church renewal. Abraham spent most of his career in the United States and was the Albert Cook Outler Professor of Wesley Studies at Perkins School of Theology at Southern Methodist University. He previously taught at Seattle Pacific University and was a visiting professor at Harvard Divinity School. Abraham was associated with the Confessing Movement in the United Methodist Church and was a proponent of canonical theism, a church renewal movement that looks to the canons of the ancient ecumenical church as a source for renewing mainline Protestant churches.

== Education ==
Abraham attended Methodist College in Belfast, Northern Ireland, then completed his undergraduate studies at the Queen's University of Belfast, earning a Bachelor of Arts degree in 1970 in philosophy and psychology. He then attended Asbury Theological Seminary, earning a Master of Divinity degree in 1973, before earning his Doctor of Philosophy degree at Regent's Park College, Oxford University, in 1977. He was also awarded an honorary Doctor of Divinity degree from Asbury in 2008.

== Selected publications ==
=== Books ===
- The Divine Inspiration of Holy Scripture (Oxford: Oxford University Press, 1981);
- An Introduction to the Philosophy of Religion (Englewood Cliffs, NJ: Prentice-Hall, 1985);
- The Rationality of Religious Belief, edited with Steven W. Holtzer (Oxford: Clarendon Press, 1987);
- The Logic of Evangelism (Grand Rapids: Eerdmans, 1989);
- Waking From Doctrinal Amnesia: The Healing of Doctrine in the United Methodist Church (Abingdon Press: Nashville, 1995);
- Canon and Criterion in Christian Theology (Oxford: Clarendon Press, 1998);
- Divine Revelation and the Limits of Historical Criticism (Oxford: Oxford University Press, 2000);
- Crossing the Threshold of Divine Revelation (Grand Rapids: Eerdmans, 2007);
- Canonical Theism: A Proposal for Theology and the Church, edited with Jason E. Vickers and Natalie B. Van Kirk (Grand Rapids: Eerdmans, 2008);
- The Oxford Handbook of Methodist Studies, edited with James E. Kirby (Oxford: Oxford University, 2009);
- Aldersgate and Athens: John Wesley and the Foundations of Christian Belief (Waco: Baylor University, 2010);
- Methodism: A Very Short Introduction (Oxford: Oxford University Press, 2019);

=== Articles ===
- "Intentions and the Logic of Interpretation," The Asbury Theological Journal 43.1 (1988): 11–25.
- "The Offense of Divine Revelation" Harvard Theological Review 95, 3 (July 2002): 251–264.
- "Faith, Assurance, and Conviction: An Epistemological Commentary on Hebrews 11:1" Ex Auditu 19 (2003): 65–75.
- "Saving Souls in the Twenty-First Century: A Missiological Midrash on John Wesley" Wesleyan Theological Journal 38, 1 (Spring 2003): 7-20.
- "The End of Wesleyan Theology" Wesleyan Theological Journal 40, 1 (Spring 2005): 7-25.
- "Whose Wesley? Which Wesleyan Tradition?" Wesleyan Theological Journal 46, 2 (Fall 2011): 142–149.
- "The Future of Scripture: In Search of a Theology of Scripture." Wesleyan Theological Journal 46, 1 (Spring 2011): 7-23.
- "Lethal Force in a World of Market States." Wesleyan Theological Journal 47, 1 (Spring 2012): 25–36.

=== Chapters ===
- "Predestination and Assurance." In The Grace of God and the Will of Man, ed. Clark H. Pinnock. Minneapolis: Bethany House, 1989.
- "A Theology of Evangelism: The Heart of the Matter." In The Study of Evangelism: Exploring a Missional Practice of the Church, eds. Paul W. Chilcote & Laceye C. Warner. Grand Rapids: Eerdmans, 2008.
- "Eschatology and Epistemology." In The Oxford Handbook of Eschatology, ed. Jerry L. Walls. Oxford: Oxford University, 2008.
- "Canonical Theism and the Life of the Church." In Canonical Theism: A Proposal for Theology and the Church, eds. William J. Abraham, Jason E. Vickers, and Natalie B. Van Kirk. Grand Rapids: Eerdmans, 2008.
- "Canonical Theism and the Future of Systematic Theology." In Canonical Theism: A Proposal for Theology and the Church, eds. William J. Abraham, Jason E. Vickers, and Natalie B. Van Kirk. Grand Rapids: Eerdmans, 2008.
- "Canonical Theism and Evangelicalism." In Canonical Theism: A Proposal for Theology and the Church, eds. William J. Abraham, Jason E. Vickers, and Natalie B. Van Kirk. Grand Rapids: Eerdmans, 2008.
- "The Emergence of Canonical Theism." In Canonical Theism: A Proposal for Theology and the Church, eds. William J. Abraham, Jason E. Vickers, and Natalie B. Van Kirk. Grand Rapids: Eerdmans, 2008.
- "Handing on the Teaching of the Apostles: A Canonical Episcopacy." In Canonical Theism: A Proposal for Theology and the Church, eds. William J. Abraham, Jason E. Vickers, and Natalie B. Van Kirk. Grand Rapids: Eerdmans, 2008.
- "Christian Perfection." In The Oxford Handbook of Methodist Studies, eds. William J. Abraham and James E. Kirby. Oxford: Oxford University, 2009.
- "Systematic Theology as Analytic Theology." In Analytic Theology: Essays in the Philosophy of Theology, eds. Oliver D. Crisp and Michael C. Rea. Oxford: Oxford University, 2009.
- "Wesley as Preacher." In The Cambridge Companion to John Wesley, eds. Randy L. Maddox and Jason E. Vickers. New York: Cambridge University, 2010.
- "The End of Wesleyan Theology." In The Continuing Relevance of Wesleyan Theology: Essays in Honor of Laurence W. Wood, ed. Nathan Crawford. Eugene: Pickwick, 2011.
