= Omnipotence paradox =

Family of paradoxes around the definition of omnipotence

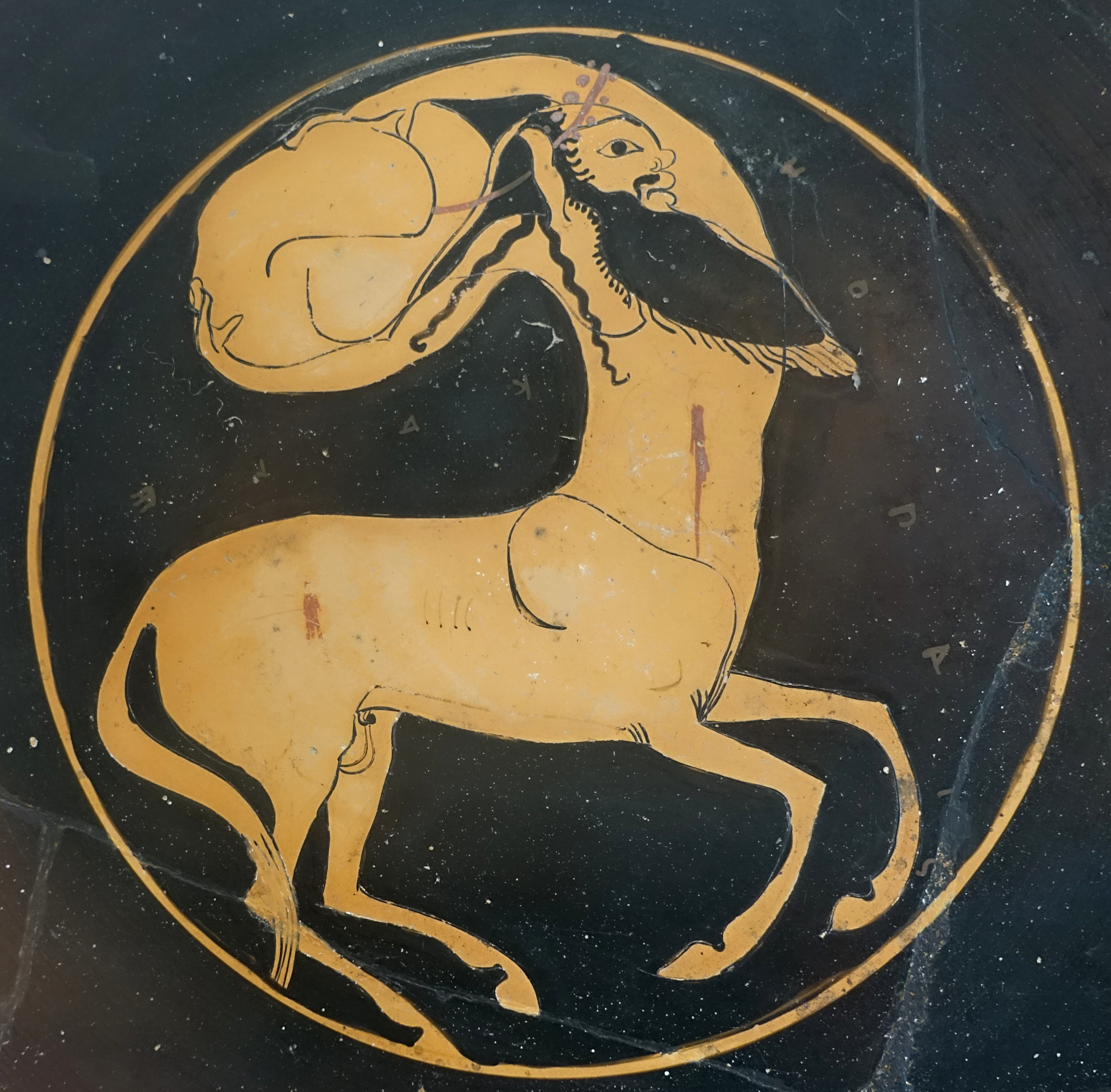
The paradox of the stone uses the idea of an immovable stone to question definitions of omnipotence. Attic kylix of a centaur, c. 510-500 BC.

The omnipotence paradox is a family of paradoxes that arise with varying understandings of the concept of omnipotence. The paradox arises, for example, if one assumes that an omnipotent being has no limits and is capable of realizing any outcome, even a logically contradictory one such as creating a square circle. Atheological arguments based on the omnipotence paradox are sometimes described as evidence for countering theism. Other possible resolutions to the paradox hinge on the definition of omnipotence applied and the nature of God regarding this application and whether omnipotence is directed toward God himself or outward toward his external surroundings.

The omnipotence paradox has medieval origins, dating at least to the 10th century, when Saadia Gaon responded to the question of whether God's omnipotence extended to logical absurdities. It was later addressed by Averroes and Thomas Aquinas. Pseudo-Dionysius the Areopagite (before 532) has a predecessor version of the paradox, asking whether it is possible for God to "deny himself".

The best-known version of the omnipotence paradox is the paradox of the stone: "Could God create a stone so heavy that even he could not lift it?" This is a paradoxical question because if God could create something he could not lift, then he would not be omnipotent. Similarly, if God was able to lift the stone then that would mean he was unable to create something he could not lift, leading to the same result. Alternative statements of the paradox include "If given the axioms of Euclidean geometry, can an omnipotent being create a triangle whose angles do not add up to 180 degrees?" and "Can God create a prison so secure that he cannot escape from it?".

== Overview ==
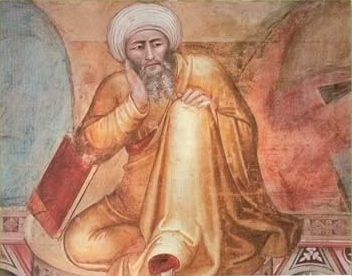
Detail depicting Averroes, who addressed the omnipotence paradox in the 12th century. From the 14th-century Triunfo de Santo Tomás by Andrea da Firenze (di Bonaiuto).

A common modern version of the omnipotence paradox is expressed in the question: "Can [an omnipotent being] create a stone so heavy that it cannot lift it?" This question generates a dilemma. The being can either create a stone it cannot lift, or it cannot create a stone it cannot lift. If the being can create a stone that it cannot lift, then it is not omnipotent because there is a weight threshold beyond its own power to lift. If the being cannot create a stone it cannot lift, then there is something it cannot create, and is therefore not omnipotent. In either case, the being is not omnipotent. This modern version is referred to as the Paradox of the Stone.

A related issue is whether the concept of "logically possible" is different for a world in which omnipotence exists than a world in which omnipotence does not exist.

The dilemma of omnipotence is similar to another classic paradox—the irresistible force paradox: "What would happen if an irresistible force were to meet an immovable object?" One response to this paradox is to disallow its formulation, by saying that if a force is irresistible, then by definition there is no immovable object; or conversely, if an immovable object exists, then by definition no force can be irresistible. Another response to this that the only way out of this paradox is if the irresistible force and immovable object never meet. However this does not hold up under scrutiny, because an object cannot in principle be immovable if a force exists that can in principle move it, regardless of whether the force and the object actually meet.

== Types of omnipotence ==
Augustine of Hippo in his City of God writes "God is called omnipotent on account of His doing what He wills" and thus proposes the definition that "Y is omnipotent" means "If Y wishes to do X then Y can and does do X".

The notion of omnipotence can also be applied to an entity in different ways. An essentially omnipotent being is an entity that is necessarily omnipotent. In contrast, an accidentally omnipotent being is an entity that can be omnipotent for a temporary period of time, and then becomes non-omnipotent. The omnipotence paradox can be applied to each type of being differently.

In addition, some philosophers have considered the assumption that a being is either omnipotent or non-omnipotent to be a false dilemma, as it neglects the possibility of varying degrees of omnipotence. Some modern approaches to the problem have involved semantic debates over whether language—and therefore philosophy—can meaningfully address the concept of omnipotence itself.

== Proposed answers ==
=== Omnipotence does not mean breaking the laws of logic ===
A common response from philosophers is that the paradox assumes a wrong definition of omnipotence. Omnipotence, they say, does not mean that God can do anything at all but, instead, that he can do anything that is logically possible; he cannot, for instance, make a square circle. Likewise, God cannot make a being greater than himself, because he is, by definition, the greatest possible being. God is limited in his actions by his nature. The Christian Bible, in passages such as Hebrews 6:18, says it is "impossible for God to lie".

A good example of a modern defender of this line of reasoning is George I. Mavrodes. Essentially, Mavrodes argues that it is not a limitation on a being's omnipotence to say that it cannot make a round square. Such a "task" is termed by him a "pseudo-task" as it is self-contradictory and inherently nonsensical. Harry Frankfurt—following from René Descartes—has responded to this solution with a proposal of his own: that God can create a stone impossible to lift and also lift said stone.

For why should God not be able to perform the task in question? To be sure, it is a task—the task of lifting a stone which He cannot lift—whose description is self-contradictory. But if God is supposedly capable of performing one task whose description is self-contradictory—that of creating the problematic stone in the first place—why should He not be supposedly capable of performing another—that of lifting the stone? After all, is there any greater trick in performing two logically impossible tasks than there is in performing one?

If a being is accidentally omnipotent, it can resolve the paradox by creating a stone it cannot lift, thereby becoming non-omnipotent. Unlike essentially omnipotent entities, it is possible for an accidentally omnipotent being to be non-omnipotent. This raises the question, however, of whether the being was ever truly omnipotent, or just capable of great power. On the other hand, the ability to voluntarily give up great power is often thought of as central to the Christian doctrine of incarnation.

If a being is essentially omnipotent, it can also resolve the paradox. The omnipotent being is essentially omnipotent; therefore, it is impossible to be non-omnipotent. Further, the omnipotent being can do what is logically impossible—just like the accidentally omnipotent—and has no limitations except the inability to become non-omnipotent. The omnipotent being cannot create a stone it cannot lift.

The omnipotent being cannot create such a stone because its power is equal to itself, thus removing the omnipotence, for there can only be one omnipotent being, but it nevertheless retains its omnipotence. This solution works even with definition 2, as long as we also know the being is essentially omnipotent rather than accidentally so. However, non-omnipotent beings can compromise their own powers, which presents the paradox that non-omnipotent beings can do something (to themselves) which an essentially omnipotent being cannot do (to itself). This was essentially the position Augustine of Hippo took in his The City of God:

For He is called omnipotent on account of His doing what He wills, not on account of His suffering what He wills not; for if that should befall Him, He would by no means be omnipotent. Wherefore, He cannot do some things for the very reason that He is omnipotent.

Thus, Augustine argued that God could not do anything or create any situation that would, in effect, make God not God.

In a 1955 article in the philosophy journal Mind, J. L. Mackie tried to resolve the paradox by distinguishing between first-order omnipotence (unlimited power to act) and second-order omnipotence (unlimited power to determine what powers to act things shall have). An omnipotent being with both first and second-order omnipotence at a particular time might restrict its own power to act and, henceforth, cease to be all-powerful in either sense. There has been considerable philosophical dispute since Mackie about the best way to formulate the paradox of omnipotence in formal logic. More recently, Budaev trivialized the paradox of the stone by converting it to an arithmetic form: "Can a person make such a big number that he/she cannot imagine a number greater than that?", apparently resulting in a solution similar to that by Savage: "One can imagine any number and always make an even bigger number".

God and logic

Although the most common translation of the noun "Logos" is "Word" other translations have been used. Gordon Clark (1902–1985), a Calvinist theologian and expert on pre-Socratic philosophy, famously translated Logos as "Logic": "In the beginning was the Logic, and the Logic was with God and the Logic was God". He meant to imply by this translation that the laws of logic were derived from God and formed part of Creation, and were therefore not a secular principle imposed on the Christian world view.

God obeys the laws of logic because God is eternally logical in the same way that God does not perform evil actions because God is eternally good. So, God, by nature logical and unable to violate the laws of logic, cannot make a boulder so heavy he cannot lift it because that would violate the law of non contradiction by creating an immovable object and an unstoppable force.

This raises the question, similar to the Euthyphro Dilemma, of where this law of logic, which God is bound to obey, comes from. According to the theologians Norman Geisler and William Lane Craig, this law is not a law above God that he assents to but, rather, logic is an eternal part of God's nature, like his omniscience or omnibenevolence.

=== Paradox is meaningless: the question is sophistry ===
Another common response is that since God is supposedly omnipotent, the phrase "could not lift" does not make sense, and the paradox is meaningless. This may mean that the complexity involved in rightly understanding omnipotence—contra all the logical details involved in misunderstanding it—is a function of the fact that omnipotence, like infinity, is perceived at all by contrasting reference to those complex and variable things, which it is not. An alternative meaning, however, is that a non-corporeal God cannot lift anything, but can raise it (a linguistic pedantry)—or to use the beliefs of Hindus (that there is one God, who can manifest as several different beings), that whilst it is possible for God to do all things, it is not possible for all his incarnations to do them. As such, God could create a stone so heavy that, in one incarnation, he could not lift it, yet could do something that an incarnation that could lift the stone could not.

The lifting a rock paradox (Can God lift a stone larger than he can carry?) uses human characteristics to cover up the main skeletal structure of the question. With these assumptions made, two arguments can stem from them:

1. Lifting covers the definition of translation, which means moving something from one point in space to another. With this in mind, the real question would be, "Can God move a rock from one location in space to another that is larger than possible?" For the rock to be unable to move from one space to another, it would have to be larger than space itself. However, it is impossible for a rock to be larger than space, as space always adjusts itself to cover the space of the rock. If the supposed rock were out of space-time dimension, then the question would not make sense, because it would be impossible to move an object from one location in space to another if there is no space to begin with, meaning the fault is with the logic of the question and not God's capabilities.
2. The words "Lift a Stone" are used instead to substitute capability. With this in mind, essentially the question is asking if God is incapable, so that the real question would be, "Is God capable of being incapable?" If God is capable of being incapable, it means he is incapable, because he has the potential not to be able to do something. Conversely, if God is incapable of being incapable, the two inabilities cancel each other out, giving God the capability to do something.

The act of killing oneself is not applicable to an omnipotent being, since, despite that such an act does involve some power, it also involves a lack of power: the human person who can kill himself is already not indestructible, and, in fact, every agent constituting his environment is more powerful in some ways than himself. In other words, all non-omnipotent agents are concretely synthetic: constructed as contingencies of other, smaller, agents, meaning that they, unlike an omnipotent agent, logically can exist not only in multiple instantiation (by being constructed out of the more basic agents they are made of), but are each bound to a different location in space contra transcendent omnipresence.

George I. Mavrodes responded to this paradox by arguing that the question is self-contradictory. He wrote:

"On the assumption that God is omnipotent, the phrase "a stone too heavy for God to lift" becomes self-contradictory. For it becomes "a stone which cannot be lifted by Him whose power is sufficient for lifting anything."... ...it is the very omnipotence of God which makes the existence of such a stone absolutely impossible, while it is the fact that I am finite in power that makes it possible for me to make a boat too heavy for me to lift."

Additionally, he also points out how the question is sophistry. If the objector insists that it is a coherent question, one replies by affirming that God can create such a stone. It may seem that this reply will force one into the original dilemma. But it does not. For now, the objector can draw no damaging conclusion from this answer. And the reason is that he has just now contended that such a stone is compatible with the omnipotence of God. Therefore, from the possibility of God's creating such a stone, it cannot be concluded that God is not omnipotent. The objector cannot have it both ways. The conclusion that the objector wishes to draw from an affirmative answer to the original question is that the required proof that the descriptive phrase appears there is self-contradictory.

C. S. Lewis argues that when talking about omnipotence, referencing "a rock so heavy that God cannot lift it" is nonsense just as much as referencing "a square circle"; that it is not logically coherent in terms of power to think that omnipotence includes the power to do the logically impossible. So asking "Can God create a rock so heavy that even he cannot lift it?" is just as much nonsense as asking "Can God draw a square circle?" The logical contradiction here is God's simultaneous ability and disability in lifting the rock: the statement "God can lift this rock" must have a truth value of either true or false; it cannot possess both. This is justified by observing that for the omnipotent agent to create such a stone, it must already be more powerful than itself: such a stone is too heavy for the omnipotent agent to lift, but the omnipotent agent already can create such a stone; If an omnipotent agent already is more powerful than itself, then it already is just that powerful. This means that its power to create a stone too heavy to lift is identical to its power to lift that very stone. While this does not quite make complete sense, Lewis wished to stress its implicit point: that even within the attempt to prove that the concept of omnipotence is immediately incoherent, one admits that it is immediately coherent, and that the only difference is that this attempt is forced to admit this despite that the attempt is constituted by a perfectly irrational route to its own unwilling end, with a perfectly irrational set of 'things' included in that end.

In other words, the 'limit' on what omnipotence 'can' do is not a limit on its actual agency, but an epistemological boundary without which omnipotence could not be identified (paradoxically or otherwise) in the first place. This process is merely a fancier form of the classic Liar Paradox: If I say, "I am a liar", then how can it be true if I am telling the truth therewith, and, if I am telling the truth therewith, then how can I be a liar? So, to think that omnipotence is an epistemological paradox is like failing to recognize that, when taking the statement, 'I am a liar' self-referentially, the statement is reduced to an actual failure to lie. In other words, if one maintains the supposedly 'initial' position that the necessary conception of omnipotence includes the 'power' to compromise both itself and all other identity, and if one concludes from this position that omnipotence is epistemologically incoherent, then one implicitly is asserting that one's own 'initial' position is incoherent. Therefore, the question (and thus the perceived paradox) is meaningless. Nonsense does not suddenly acquire sense and meaning by adding the words "God can" before it. Lewis additionally said that, "Unless something is self-evident, nothing can be proved". This implies for the debate on omnipotence that, as in matter, so in the human understanding of truth: it takes no true insight to destroy a perfectly integrated structure, and the effort to destroy has greater effect than an equal effort to build; so, a man is thought a fool who assumes its integrity, and thought an abomination who argues for it. It is easier to teach a fish to swim in outer space than to convince a room full of ignorant fools why it cannot be done.

=== Paradox assumes the rock has already been created ===
In 1999, Matthew Whittle asserts that it should not be outside the scope of powers for an omnipotent being to make itself non-omnipotent, so indeed making a rock too heavy to lift is possible for God. The follow-up question, "Then can he lift it?" assumes that the rock has already been created, so the correct answer would be "Assuming he makes the rock, no". And if asked, "Is God thus not all powerful?", the correct answer would be, "God is indeed all powerful until such time as the rock is created". The "Paradox" then is not really a paradox.

== Language and omnipotence ==
The philosopher Ludwig Wittgenstein is frequently interpreted as arguing that language is not up to the task of describing the kind of power an omnipotent being would have. In his Tractatus Logico-Philosophicus, he stays generally within the realm of logical positivism until claim 6.4—but at 6.41 and following, he argues that ethics and several other issues are "transcendental" subjects that we cannot examine with language. Wittgenstein also mentions the will, life after death, and God—arguing that, "When the answer cannot be put into words, neither can the question be put into words".

Wittgenstein's work expresses the omnipotence paradox as a problem in semantics—the study of how we give symbols meaning. (The retort "That's only semantics" is a way of saying that a statement only concerns the definitions of words, instead of anything important in the physical world.) According to the Tractatus, then, even attempting to formulate the omnipotence paradox is futile, since language cannot refer to the entities the paradox considers. The final proposition of the Tractatus gives Wittgenstein's dictum for these circumstances: "What we cannot speak of, we must pass over in silence".

Wittgenstein's approach to these problems is influential among other 20th-century religious thinkers such as Dewi Zephaniah Phillips. In his later years, however, Wittgenstein wrote works often interpreted as conflicting with his positions in the Tractatus, and indeed the later Wittgenstein is mainly seen as the leading critic of the early Wittgenstein.

== Other versions of the paradox ==
The 6th-century Christian theologian Pseudo-Dionysius the Areopagite claims that a version of the omnipotence paradox constituted the dispute between Paul the Apostle and Elymas the Magician mentioned in Acts 13:8, but it is phrased in terms of a debate as to whether God can "deny himself" a'la 2 Tim 2:13. In the 11th century, Anselm of Canterbury argues that there are many things that God cannot do, but that nonetheless he counts as omnipotent.

Thomas Aquinas advanced a version of the omnipotence paradox by asking whether God could create a triangle with internal angles that did not add up to 180 degrees. As Thomas put it in Summa contra Gentiles:

Since the principles of certain sciences, such as logic, geometry and arithmetic are taken only from the formal principles of things, on which the essence of the thing depends, it follows that God could not make things contrary to these principles. For example, that a genus was not predicable of the species, or that lines drawn from the centre to the circumference were not equal, or that a triangle did not have three angles equal to two right angles.

This can be done on a sphere, and not on a flat surface. The later invention of non-Euclidean geometry does not resolve this question; for one might as well ask, "If given the axioms of Riemannian geometry, can an omnipotent being create a triangle whose angles do not add up to more than 180 degrees?" In either case, the real question is whether an omnipotent being would have the ability to evade consequences that follow logically from a system of axioms that the being created.

A version of the paradox can also be seen in non-theological contexts. A similar problem occurs when accessing legislative or parliamentary sovereignty, which holds a specific legal institution to be omnipotent in legal power, and in particular such an institution's ability to regulate itself.

In a sense, the classic statement of the omnipotence paradox—a rock so heavy that its omnipotent creator cannot lift it—is grounded in Aristotelian science. After all, if we consider the stone's position relative to the sun the planet orbits around, one could hold that the stone is constantly lifted—strained though that interpretation would be in the present context. Modern physics indicates that the choice of phrasing about lifting stones should relate to acceleration; however, this does not in itself of course invalidate the fundamental concept of the generalized omnipotence paradox. However, one could easily modify the classic statement as follows: "An omnipotent being creates a universe that follows the laws of Aristotelian physics. Within this universe, can the omnipotent being create a stone so heavy that the being cannot lift it?"

Ethan Allen's Reason addresses the topics of original sin, theodicy and several others in classic Age of Enlightenment fashion. In Chapter 3, section IV, he notes that "omnipotence itself" could not exempt animal life from mortality, since change and death are defining attributes of such life. He argues, "the one cannot be without the other, any more than there could be a compact number of mountains without valleys, or that I could exist and not exist at the same time, or that God should effect any other contradiction in nature". Labeled by his friends a Deist, Allen accepted the notion of a divine being, though throughout Reason he argues that even a divine being must be circumscribed by logic.

In Principles of Philosophy, Descartes tried refuting the existence of atoms with a variation of this argument, claiming God could not create things so indivisible that he could not divide them.

== See also ==
- Gödel's incompleteness theorems
- List of paradoxes
- Problem of evil
