= William Harry Jellema =

American philosopher (1893–1982)

- Born: March 10, 1893; Chicago, Illinois
- Died: May 16, 1982 (aged 89); Grand Rapids, Michigan

Academic background
- Education: Calvin University; University of Michigan

William Harry Jellema (March 10, 1893 – May 16, 1982) was an American philosopher and the founder of Calvin University's philosophy department. He also taught at Indiana University and Grand Valley State College.

Three of his students from Calvin were elected President of the American Philosophical Association, and two of his students delivered the Gifford Lectures. Alvin Plantinga described Jellema as "by all odds ... the most gifted teacher of philosophy I have ever encountered" and "obviously in dead earnest about Christianity; he was also a magnificently thoughtful and reflective Christian." Another of his students was the novelist Frederick Manfred, who based a character, Mr. Hobbes, on Jellema in his first novel The Primitive.

== Biography ==
Jellema was born in Chicago, Illinois on March 10, 1893. He graduated from Calvin University (then, Calvin College) in 1914 and completed his PhD at the University of Michigan. He was a professor of philosophy at Calvin College from 1920 to 1936 and later from 1948 to 1963; in the interim, he was head of the philosophy department at Indiana University. Following his mandatory retirement from Calvin College, Jellema taught for a year at Haverford College and was invited by James Zumberge to found the philosophy department at Grand Valley State College in Allendale, Michigan, and continue his teaching for another five years.

He died May 16, 1982 at Butterworth Hospital in Grand Rapids, Michigan. His wife, Frances (née Peters), predeceased him, and he was survived by five children, one of whom, Jon Jellema, served in the Michigan House of Representatives. The poet Rod Jellema was his nephew.

== Honours ==
The Jellema Lectures at Calvin University are named in his honor. Past Jellema lecturers have included J. R. Lucas (1987), Richard Swinburne (1988), Marilyn McCord Adams (1992), Sarah Coakley (2001), and Nancey Murphy (2009). There is also a study room in Calvin University's Hiemenga Hall named the Jellema Room, which contains Jellema's library.
