= Exemplarist Moral Theory =

2017 book by Linda Zagzebski

- Author: Linda Zagzebski
- Language: English
- Published: 2017 (Oxford University Press)
- Publisher: Oxford University Press
- Pages: 274
- ISBN: 9780190655846

Exemplarist Moral Theory is a book about moral philosophy by Linda Zagzebski, published in 2017 based on her Gifford Lectures.
