= Linda Zagzebski =

American Catholic philosopher (born 1946)

- Born: Linda Trinkaus; 1946 (age 79–80)
- Other name: Linda Trinkaus Zagzebski
- Spouse: Ken Zagzebski

Education
- Education: Stanford University; University of California, Berkeley; University of California, Los Angeles (PhD, 1979)
- Thesis: Natural Kinds (1979)
- Doctoral advisor: Tyler Burge

Philosophical work
- Era: Contemporary philosophy
- Region: Western philosophy
- School: Analytic philosophy; Virtue ethics
- Institutions: Loyola Marymount University; University of Oklahoma
- Main interests: Epistemology; Ethics; Philosophy of religion
- Notable ideas: Exemplarist virtue theory; Epistemic authority; Virtue epistemology

Linda Trinkaus Zagzebski (born 1946) is an American philosopher. She is the Emerita George Lynn Cross Research Professor, as well as Emerita Kingfisher College Chair of the Philosophy of Religion and Ethics, at the University of Oklahoma. She writes in the areas of epistemology, philosophy of religion, and virtue ethics.

== Education and career ==
Zagzebski received her Bachelor of Arts degree from Stanford University, her Master of Arts degree from University of California, Berkeley, and her Doctor of Philosophy degree from University of California, Los Angeles in 1979 with a dissertation on "Natural Kinds" under the supervision of Tyler Burge. She taught at Loyola Marymount University from 1979 to 1999, before joining the University of Oklahoma.

She delivered the Wilde Lectures in Natural Religion at Oxford University in the spring of 2010 on epistemic authority. She was (2015–2016) president of the American Philosophical Association Central Division, and gave the Gifford Lectures at the University of St. Andrews in the fall of 2015 on the topic of exemplarist virtue theory. She is past president of the American Catholic Philosophical Association (1997–1998), and past president of the Society of Christian Philosophers (2004–2007).

In 2022, she was elected a Fellow of the American Academy of Arts & Sciences.

== Philosophical work ==
Her research in recent years has consisted of topics such as the intersection of ethics and epistemology, religious epistemology, religious ethics, virtue theory, and the varieties of fatalism. She delivered the Wilde Lectures in Natural Religion at Oxford University in the spring of 2010 on epistemic authority. She is (2015–2016) president of the American Philosophical Association Central Division, and gave the Gifford Lectures at the University of St. Andrews in the fall of 2015 on the topic of exemplarist virtue theory. She is past president of the American Catholic Philosophical Association (1997–1998), and past president of the Society of Christian Philosophers (2004–2007).

=== Epistemology ===
Zagzebski is a pioneer in the field of virtue epistemology. In Virtues of the Mind (1996), she sets out to solve certain problems in modern epistemology by developing an Aristotelian version of virtue theory, and in the course of this project she lays out a general analysis of virtue. In Divine Motivation Theory (2004) she deals extensively with problems in the relationship between reason, faith, and ethics.

She has done work on questions of epistemic value including the "espresso machine" thought experiment (a predecessor to the swamping problem) as a counter to reliabilism.

In her book, Epistemic Authority: A Theory of Trust, Authority, and Autonomy in Belief (2012), she defends a strong sense of epistemic authority including authority in moral and religious beliefs, and argues that belief on authority is a requirement of intellectual autonomy. This book arose out of her 2010 Wilde lectures at Oxford.

In the paper titled The Inescapability of Gettier Problems, Zagzebski argued that any modification of the last condition given in the Plato's definition of knowledge as justified true belief (JTB) unavoidably shall be reconducted to the unsolved case of the Gettier problem. This result is also true and valuable for any additional condition applied to the JTB.

In 1996, Zagzebski defined knowledge as a "state of true belief arising out of acts of intellectual virtue", where the word 'true' can be omitted.

According to the Aristotelian virtue theory, she defined virtue as a "deep and enduring acquired excellence of a person, involving a characteristic motivation to produce a certain desired end and reliable success in bringing about that end." Denying innatism, she believes virtue is disposition plus ability and the universal human capability of achieving a good life and happiness. Moral and intellectual virtues can't be separated and, more particularly, knowledge is obtained from practicing intellectual virtues like responsibility, fairness, and courage. True belief -in the forms of propositional knowledge and of cognitive contact with reality- are gained by a right disposition of the intellect to desire truth, and a good practice which sews the intellectual virtues on the personhood, like a new habit of the body. People who are rightly motivated to know the truth are also capable to develop specific skills, build up and assess the reliability of personal and well-formed procedures, rather than doing the same for good belief-forming processes shared between peers.

== Selected works ==
- The Dilemma of Freedom and Foreknowledge. New York: Oxford University Press. 1991. ISBN 978-0-19-510763-0.
- Virtues of the Mind: An Inquiry into the Nature of Virtue and the Ethical Foundations of Knowledge. Cambridge, England: Cambridge University Press. 1996. doi:10.1017/CBO9781139174763. ISBN 978-0-521-57826-4.
- Virtue Epistemology: Essays on Epistemic Virtue and Responsibility. Edited with Fairweather, Abrol. New York: Oxford University Press. 2001. ISBN 978-0-19-514077-4.
- Intellectual Virtue: Perspectives from Ethics and Epistemology. Edited with DePaul, Michael. Oxford: Clarendon Press. 2003. doi:10.1093/acprof:oso/9780199252732.001.0001. ISBN 978-0-19-925273-2.
- Divine Motivation Theory. Cambridge, England: Cambridge University Press. 2004. doi:10.1017/CBO9780511606823. ISBN 978-0-521-53576-2.
- Philosophy of Religion: An Historical Introduction. Malden, Massachusetts: Blackwell Publishing. 2007. ISBN 978-1-4051-1872-9.
- On Epistemology. Belmont, California: Wadsworth Press. 2008. ISBN 978-0-534-25234-2.
- Epistemic Authority: A Theory of Trust, Authority, and Autonomy in Belief. New York: Oxford University Press. 2012. doi:10.1093/acprof:oso/9780199936472.001.0001. ISBN 978-0-19-993647-2.
- Exemplarist Moral Theory. New York: Oxford University Press. 2017. doi:10.1093/acprof:oso/9780190655846.001.0001. ISBN 978-0-19-065584-6.

== See also ==
- American philosophy

Academic offices
Preceded by	Gifford Lecturer at the University of St. Andrews; 2015	Succeeded by
Preceded by Robert Audi	President of the Society of Christian Philosophers; 2004–2007	Succeeded by William J. Wainright
