= William de Burgh (philosopher) =

English philosopher (1866–1943)

William de Burgh FBA
- de Burgh in 1939 by Walter Stoneman
- Born: William George de Burgh; 24 October 1866; Wandsworth, England
- Died: 27 August 1943 (aged 76); Toller Porcorum, England
- Spouse: Edith Mary Grace (m. 1897)

Academic background
- Education: Merton College, Oxford

Academic work
- Discipline: Philosophy
- Institutions: University of Reading
- Notable works: Legacy of the Ancient World (1924)

William George de Burgh FBA (English: /dəˈbɜːr/ də-BUR; 24 October 1866 – 27 August 1943) was an English philosopher who was Professor of Philosophy at the University of Reading.

== Career ==
Born on 24 October 1866 in Wandsworth, de Burgh was educated at Winchester and Merton College, Oxford. At the latter he obtained a first in Literæ Humaniores ('Greats") in 1889. He was then briefly an assistant master at Derby School, then a tutor at Toynbee Hall, and then a University Extension lecturer in Stepney.

From 1896 de Burgh was a lecturer in Greek and Latin at the University Extension College at Reading. This being an 'extension college' of the University of Oxford's Christ Church college that was formally opened in 1892, and intended to provide part-time adult education.

In 1907 the College at Reading became a University College (a college that delivered university-level teaching though it did not hold its own degree-awarding power) still affiliated with Christ Church. And in that year de Burgh became Professor of Philosophy and Dean of the Faculty of Letters. His lectureship in Classics was relinquished in 1910, but both of these two latter posts he retained until he retired in 1934.

A. E. Taylor describes de Burgh as, after the first few years, devoting his life to the "making of a University College into a University, an independent centre of an education in ‘living well’, in the full Aristotelian sense." Knox and Creffield record that whilst the credit for Reading becoming a university in 1926 "is generally ascribed to W. M. Childs" and "the acquisition of the necessary funds was Childs's work, the academic statesmanship was de Burgh's."

A committed Anglican, de Burgh attempted to build a distinctly Christian philosophical argument for the truth of the gospel, a project that, as Knox and Creffield note, was "unfashionable at a time when protestant theologians were disparaging reason and when few philosophers were interested in religion,"

W.G. de Burgh was, as Geoff Dumbreck notes, "deeply influenced by the classics and used ideas from ancient Greek philosophy to address modern philosophical problems." He was also concerned that "the focus on the scientific method left little room" for what Alan P. F. Sell refers to as the "moral-cum-spiritual dimension." His main target being, as Dumbrek notes, the logical positivists,

He died on 27 August 1943 in Toller Porcorum, Dorset.

== Works ==
- (1912) The Legacy of Greece of Rome London: MacDonald & Evans
- (1924) The Legacy of the Ancient World
- (1937) Towards a Religious Philosophy
- (1938) From Morality to Religion (Gifford Lectures)
- (1939) Knowledge of the Individual *(Riddell Memorial Lectures)
- (1949) The Life of Reason
