= Theism and Humanism =

1915 book by A.J. Balfour

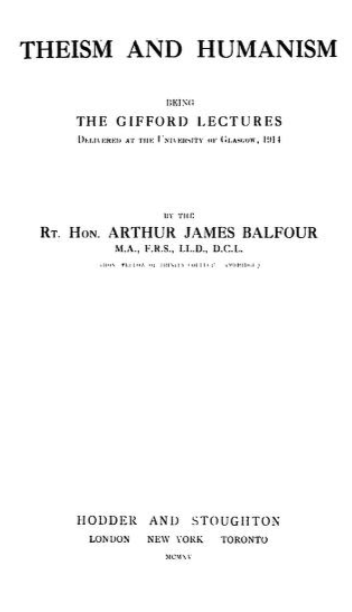
- Title page for Theism and Humanism (1915)
- Author: A.J. Balfour
- Language: English
- Published: 1915 (Hodder & Stoughton)
- Publisher: Hodder & Stoughton

Theism and Humanism is a book by A.J. Balfour published in 1915 based on his 1914 Gifford Lectures. This book has been reviewed by T.S. Eliot in the journal Ethics and C. S. Lewis has named it as one of the books that had the most influence on him.
