= Paul Helm =

British philosopher and theologian (1940–2025)

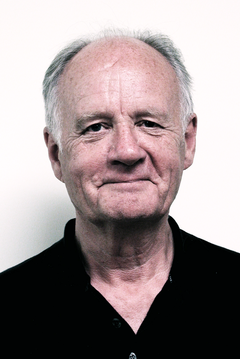
Paul Helm

Paul Helm (1940–2025) was a British philosopher and Reformed theologian. He taught at Regent College, having served as the first incumbent of the J. I. Packer Chair of Theology there from 2001 to 2005. He also served as Professor of Theology at Highland Theological College, Scotland, from 2007 to 2010.

== Education ==
Helm was educated (BA, MA) at Worcester College, Oxford, and began his teaching career at the University of Liverpool, where he rose from Lecturer to Senior Lecturer to Reader in Philosophy (1964–93). He was subsequently appointed as Professor of the History and Philosophy of Religion at King's College London (1993–2000).

== Writings ==
His voluminous writings ranged over philosophy of religion, philosophical theology, historical theology and apologetics. The bulk of his work, however, was on the doctrine of God (Eternal God, Clarendon, 1988; The Providence of God, IVP, 1993), religious belief (The Last Things, Banner of Truth, 1989; Belief Policies, Cambridge, 1994; Faith and Understanding, Eerdmans, 1997; Faith with Reason, Oxford, 2000), and the thought of John Calvin (Calvin and the Calvinists, Banner of Truth, 1982; John Calvin's Ideas, Oxford, 2004; Calvin: A Guide for the Perplexed, T & T Clark, 2008; Calvin at the Centre, Oxford, 2010). Helm debated Christian apologist William Lane Craig on Calvinism and Molinism. According to Carl Trueman, Helm's "major scholarly contributions lay in his application of Anglo-American philosophy to the doctrine of God."

Among his smaller works was The Callings: The Gospel in the World, Banner of Truth, 1987, which showed that instead of dividing life into 'spiritual' and 'secular' compartments every moment of it could be lived fully to the glory of God.
