= Phillip Cary =

American philosopher

- Born: Phillip S. Cary; June 10, 1958 (age 68)

Academic background
- Education: Washington University in St. Louis; Yale University
- Thesis: Signs and Inwardness (1994)
- Doctoral advisor: Nicholas Wolterstorff
- Influences: Karl Barth; Martin Luther

Academic work
- Discipline: Philosophy
- School or tradition: Anglican theology
- Institutions: Villanova University; Eastern University
- Main interests: Augustine of Hippo; history of Christian thought; Martin Luther; theological interpretation of the Bible

Phillip S. Cary (born 1958) is a retired American philosopher who served as a professor at Eastern University with a concentration on Augustine of Hippo and the history of the reception of Augustine's thought. Born on June 10, 1958, he received his Doctor of Philosophy degree from Yale University under Nicholas Wolterstorff. He has written a number of books, including three published by Oxford University Press. Additionally, he has provided lectures on the history of Christian theology as well as on major figures in ecclesiastical history for The Teaching Company. Cary is a former Chair of the Augustine and Augustinianisms Program Unit of the American Academy of Religion (AAR) and the current editor of the academic journal Pro Ecclesia.

== Selected publications ==
- The Meaning of Protestant Theology: Luther, Augustine, and the Gospel That Gives Us Christ. Baker Academic, 2019. ISBN 1540961613.
- Good News for Anxious Christians: 10 Practical Things You Don't Have to Do. Brazos Press, 2010. ISBN 978-1587432859.
- Jonah. Brazos Theological Commentary on the Bible. Grand Rapids, Mich.: Brazos Press. 2008. ISBN 978-1587431371.
- Outward Signs: The Powerlessness of External Things in Augustine's Thought. Oxford University Press, 2008. ISBN 9780195336498.
- Inner Grace: Augustine in the Traditions of Plato and Paul. Oxford University Press, 2008. ISBN 0-19-533648-8.
- Augustine's Invention of the Inner Self: The Legacy of a Christian Platonist. Oxford University Press, 2003. ISBN 0-19-515861-X.
