= Society of Christian Philosophers =

Christian philosophhy organization

- Abbreviation: SCP
- Formation: 1978; 48 years ago
- President: Christian Miller
- Website: societyofchristianphilosophers.com

The Society of Christian Philosophers (SCP) was founded in 1978. The society is open to anyone interested in philosophy who considers themsevles a Christian. Membership is not restricted to any particular "school" of philosophy or to any branch of Christianity, nor to professional or academic philosophers. Terence Cuneo of the University of Vermont is currently President of the SCP, Justin McBrayer of Fort Lewis College is Executive Director, and Kevin Timpe of Calvin University is Treasurer.

Meetings of the society are regularly held in conjunction with the American Catholic Philosophical Association, the Eastern, Central, and Pacific Divisions of the American Philosophical Association, and the Canadian Philosophical Association, and at the World Congress of Philosophy. The society also publishes a quarterly journal, Faith and Philosophy, which addresses philosophical issues from a Christian perspective.

== Presidents ==
- 1978–1981: William Alston
- 1981–1983: Robert Merrihew Adams
- 1983–1986: Alvin Plantinga
- 1986–1989: Marilyn McCord Adams
- 1989–1992: George I. Mavrodes
- 1992–1995: Nicholas Wolterstorff
- 1995–1998: Eleonore Stump
- 1998–2001: C. Stephen Evans
- 2001–2004: Robert Audi
- 2004–2007: Linda Zagzebski
- 2007–2010: William J. Wainright
- 2010–2013: Peter van Inwagen
- 2013–2016: Michael Rea
- 2016–2019: Michael Bergmann
- 2020–2022: Terence Cuneo
- 2022–2026: Timothy O'Connor
- 2026–present: Christian Miller
