= Robert Merrihew Adams =

American philosopher (1937–2024)

Robert Merrihew Adams FBA
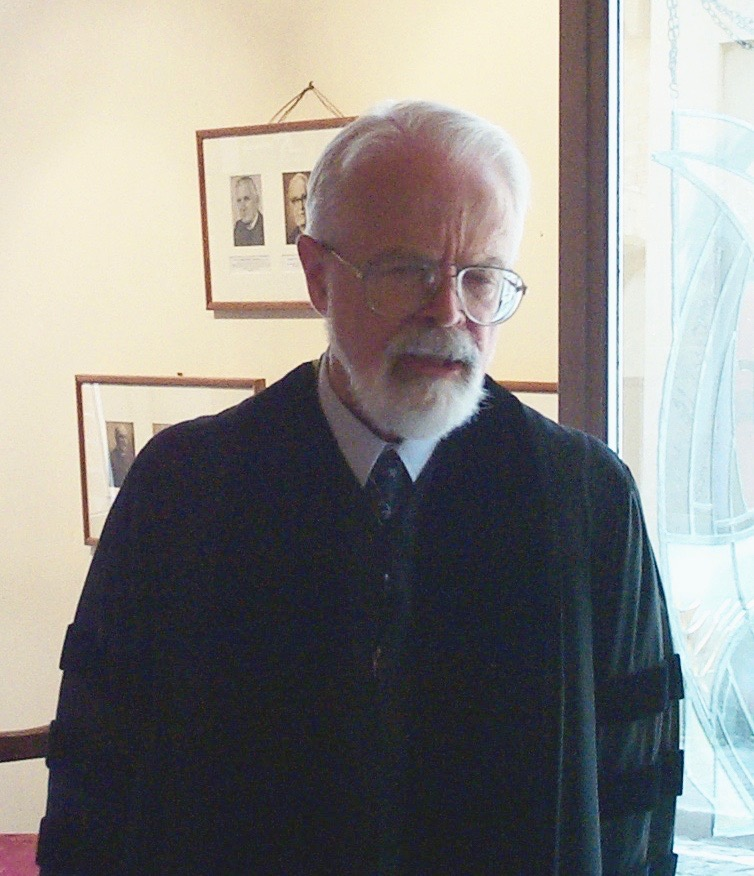
- Born: September 8, 1937; Philadelphia, Pennsylvania, U.S.
- Died: April 16, 2024 (aged 86); Montgomery, New Jersey, U.S.
- Spouse: Marilyn McCord Adams (m. 1966; died 2017)

Education
- Education: Princeton University; Mansfield College, Oxford; Princeton Theological Seminary; Cornell University

Philosophical work
- Era: 20th-century philosophy
- Region: Western philosophy
- School: Analytic
- Doctoral students: Derk Pereboom
- Main interests: Metaphysics; philosophy of religion; ethics
- Notable ideas: Divine command theory

Robert Merrihew Adams FBA (September 8, 1937 – April 16, 2024) was an American analytic philosopher. He specialized in metaphysics, philosophy of religion, ethics, and the history of early modern philosophy.

== Life and career ==
Adams was born on September 8, 1937, in Philadelphia, Pennsylvania. He taught for many years at the University of California, Los Angeles, before moving to Yale University in the early 1990s as the Clark Professor of Moral Philosophy and Metaphysics. As chairman, he helped revive the philosophy department after its near-collapse due to personal and scholarly conflicts between analytical and Continental philosophers. Adams retired from Yale in 2004 and taught part-time at the University of Oxford in England, where he was a senior research fellow of Mansfield College. In 2009 he became a Distinguished Research Professor of Philosophy at the University of North Carolina at Chapel Hill.

Adams's late wife, Marilyn McCord Adams, was also a philosopher, working on medieval philosophy and the philosophy of religion and was the Regius Professor of Divinity at Christ Church, Oxford. In 2013, both became visiting research professors at Rutgers University in conjunction with the founding of the Rutgers Center for the Philosophy of Religion.

Adams was a past president of the Society of Christian Philosophers. In 1999, he delivered the Gifford Lectures on "God and Being." He was elected a Fellow of the British Academy in 2006 and was elected a Fellow of the American Academy of Arts and Sciences in 1991.

Adams died in Montgomery, New Jersey, on April 16, 2024, at the age of 86.

== Philosophical work ==
As a historical scholar, Adams had published on the work of the philosophers Søren Kierkegaard and G.W. Leibniz. His work in the philosophy of religion includes influential essays on the problem of evil and the relation between theism and ethics. In metaphysics, Adams defended actualism in metaphysics of modality and Platonism about the nature of so-called possible worlds.

== Selected works ==
- Adams, Robert Merrihew (1972). "Must God Create the Best?". The Philosophical Review. 81 (3): 317–332. doi:10.2307/2184329. JSTOR 2184329.. Reprinted in The Virtue of Faith and Other Essays in Philosophical Theology below.
- "A Modified Divine Command Theory of Ethical Wrongness" in Religion and Morality: A Collection of Essays. eds. Gene Outka and John P. Reeder. New York: Doubleday. Reprinted in The Virtue of Faith.
- Adams, Robert Merrihew (1974). "Theories of Actuality". Noûs. 8 (3): 211–231. doi:10.2307/2214751. JSTOR 2214751.
- Adams, Robert Merrihew (1976). "Motive Utilitarianism". Journal of Philosophy. 73 (14): 467–481. doi:10.2307/2025783. JSTOR 2025783.
- Adams, Robert Merrihew (1979). "Primitive Thisness and Primitive Identity". The Journal of Philosophy. 76 (1): 5–26. doi:10.2307/2025812. JSTOR 2025812. S2CID 42069022.
- Adams, Robert Merrihew (1979). "Existence, Self-Interest, and the Problem of Evil". Noûs. 13 (1): 53–65. doi:10.2307/2214795 – via JSTOR.
- "Actualism and Thisness", Synthèse, XLIX 3–41. 1981.
- Adams, Robert Merrihew (1986). "Time and Thisness". Midwest Studies in Philosophy. 11: 315–329. doi:10.1111/j.1475-4975.1986.tb00501.x.
- The Virtue of Faith and Other Essays in Philosophical Theology. New York: Oxford University Press. 1987.
- Adams, Robert Merrihew (1985). "Involuntary Sins". The Philosophical Review. 94 (1): 3–31. doi:10.2307/2184713. JSTOR 2184713.
- "Divine Commands and the Social Nature of Obligation" Faith and Philosophy, 1987.
- "The Knight of Faith", Faith and Philosophy, 1990.
- "Moral Faith", Journal of Philosophy, 1995.
- Leibniz: Determinist, Theist, Idealist. New York: Oxford. 1994.
- "Things in Themselves", Philosophy and Phenomenological Research, 1997.
- Finite and Infinite Goods. New York: Oxford University Press. 1999.
- A Theory of Virtue: Excellence in Being for the Good. Oxford: Clarendon Press. 2006.
- What Is, and What Is In Itself: A Systematic Ontology. Oxford: Oxford University Press, 2021.
