= Swamping problem =

Epistemological issue

The swamping problem is an issue in epistemology concerning the value of knowledge relative to true belief. Under views that treat a true belief as the fundamental epistemic good, additional properties of knowledge, such as justification or reliability, contribute only instrumentally. This raises the question of whether such properties add any epistemic value beyond that of true belief itself.

The first known historical mention of the problem is in Plato's Meno, when Meno and Socrates have a discussion on how they should choose their guide to Larissa; Meno suggests that they need someone who knows the route, but Socrates suggests that someone with true opinion will do as well.
