= Christine Helmer =

Canadian theologian

- Born: Ontario, Canada
- Occupation: Full professor

Academic background
- Education: Vanier College McGill University Lutheran School of Theology at Chicago Yale University

Christine Helmer (born 1965) is a Canadian-born theologian of Christianity. Helmer’s research focuses on the sixteenth century religious reformations, early nineteenth-century and early twentieth-century German philosophy and theology, and constructive theology. She currently holds the Peter B. Ritzma Chair of Humanities at Northwestern University, where she is also Professor of German and Professor of Religious Studies. Helmer was awarded an honorary doctorate by the University of Helsinki in 2017. Her scholarship has opened up new areas of scholarly inquiry on Martin Luther and the 20th century Luther Renaissance, Friedrich Schleiermacher, and the modern study of religion.

== Early life and education ==
Helmer was born in Toronto, Canada, to parents Margarethe Helmer and Paul Helmer, a Canadian pianist and musicologist. She began her studies in Montréal and holds a D.E.C. (Diplôme d'études collégiales) in Health Sciences from Vanier College and a B.Ed. in physical education (fitness specialization) from McGill University. Upon graduation from McGill, she was awarded the Henry Birks Gold Medal and the Canadian Association of Sports Sciences Gold Medal.

Her postgraduate studies concentrated on historical and systematic theology as well as late medieval philosophy and the history of continental philosophy. She earned an M.A. from the Lutheran School of Theology in Chicago, which in 2024 awarded her its Distinguished Alumni Award. Her doctoral work on Martin Luther was conducted at Yale University, where she earned a Ph.D. in Religious Studies and was awarded the Field Prize for the most outstanding dissertation in the humanities. While at Yale, she was funded by the German Academic Exchange Service (DAAD) to conduct research at the Eberhard-Karls University of Tübingen and the Institute of European History in Mainz. She also held a post-doctoral position in the Graduate Colloquium, “Die Bibel: Ihre Enstehung und ihre Wirkung” (The Bible: Its Emergence and its Reception) at the University of Tübingen, where she researched the dialectics of Schleiermacher.

== Professional life ==
Helmer has taught at the Claremont School of Theology and Claremont Graduate University (2000-2005) and has held visiting professorships at Harvard Divinity School (fall 2003), Boston College (Corcoran Visiting Professor of Christian-Jewish Relations, 2017-2018), The University of Chicago Divinity School (spring 2023). She has been supported by fellowships from the Humboldt Foundation, the Helsinki Collegium for Advanced Studies, the Templeton Foundation, and The University of Chicago Divinity School Martin Marty Center for the Public Understanding of Religion. She has been affiliated with Northwestern University as full professor since 2007.

Helmer’s research on Luther’s doctrine of the Trinity has contributed to the study of early modern theology by emphasizing the speculative Trinity in Luther studies, developing a genre-based methodology, and making distinctive use of medieval philosophy to analyze Luther’s theological thinking. She made a similar contribution to Schleiermacher studies by bringing his philosophical dialectics to bear on his theological thought. In her work on early twentieth-century Germany, she analyzes the myriad scholarly, cultural, and political dimensions of German Lutheran theologians who helped create the modern study of religion. Helmer’s recent work focuses on the theological and political polarization among contemporary Christians on ethical issues, and together with Professor Amy Carr (Professor of Religious Studies at the University of Western Illinois) has initiated a constructive theological conversation aimed at resolving tensions.

Helmer is the founder and organizer of the Lutheran Scholars Network (LSN), an organization that promotes the historical and constructive theological and philosophical work of scholars associated with the work of Martin Luther. The LSN meets annually with the American Academy of Religion. She is on the executive committee of the Internationale Schleiermacher Gesellschaft based in Halle/Berlin (Germany), as well as on the advisory boards of the Neue Zeitschrift für systematische Theologie und Religionsphilosophie and Streit Kultur: Journal für Theologie.

== Personal life ==
Helmer is married to Robert A. Orsi, a historian of modern and contemporary religions in the United States. Her uncle is Terence Helmer of the Orford String Quartet of Canada. She is related to Clarence Orsi, a writer and professor, and is mother to Anthony Orsi, a viola performance major at Vassar College.

== Selected works ==
=== Books ===
- Helmer, Christine and Amy Carr. Ordinary Faith in Polarized Times: Justification and the Pursuit of Justice. Waco, TX: Baylor University Press, 2023. ISBN 978-1-4813-1931-7.
- How Luther Became the Reformer. Louisville, KY: Westminster John Knox Press, 2019. In Chinese translation with a new introduction, 2022: 路德神話：德國如何發明新教改革者？. ISBN 978-0-664-26287-7.
- A Constructive Theology in Conversation with Christians in Tainan. Chinese/English. Tainan, Taiwan: Taiwanese Presbyterian Church Press, 2020.
- Theology and the End of Doctrine. Louisville, Ky.: Westminster John Knox Press, 2014. In Korean translation with a new introduction: Seoul, South Korea: 100 Publishing House, 2020. ISBN 978-0-664-23929-9.
- The Trinity and Martin Luther: A Study on the Relationship Between Genre, Language and the Trinity in Luther's Works (1523-1546). Veröffentlichungen des Instituts für Europäische Geschichte/Abteilung Abendländische Religionsgeschichte 174. Mainz: Philipp von Zabern, 1999; Revised Edition, The Trinity and Martin Luther, with a new intro. and select bibliography. Studies in Historical and Systematic Theology. Bellingham, Wash.: Lexham Press, 2017. ISBN 978-3-8053-2533-2 (original edition), ISBN 978-1-68359-050-7 (revised edition).

=== Edited/co-edited books ===
- Helmer, Christine and Shannon Craigo-Snell, eds. Claiming God: Essays in Honor of Marilyn McCord Adams. Eugene, OR: Pickwick Imprint of Wipf and Stock, 2022. ISBN 978-1-66679-351-2.
- ..., ed. Truth-Telling and Other Practices of Ecclesial Resistance. Lanham, MD: Lexington/Fortress Academic, 2021. ISBN 978-1-978712-10-2.
- ..., ed. The Medieval Luther. Spätmittelalter, Humanismus, Reformation/Studies in Late Middle Ages, Humanism, and the Reformation 117, Tübingen: Mohr Siebeck, 2020. ISBN 978-3-16-158981-2.
- ... and Bo Kristian Holm, eds. Lutherrenaissance: Past and Present. Forschungen zur Kirchen- und Dogmengeschichte 106. Göttingen: Vandenhoeck & Ruprecht, 2015. ISBN 978-3-525-56415-8.
- ... and Bo Kristian Holm, eds. Transformations in Luther's Reformation Theology: Historical and Contemporary Reflections. Arbeiten zur Kirchen- und Theologiegeschichte 32. Leipzig: Evangelische Verlagsanstalt, 2011. [+ "Introduction," 9-18.] ISBN 978-3-374-02856-6.
- ..., ed. The Global Luther: A Theologian for Modern Times. Minneapolis, MN: Fortress Press, 2009. ISBN 978-0-8006-6239-4.
- ..., with Charlene T. Higbe, eds. The Multivalence of Biblical Texts and Theological Meanings. Symposium Series 37. Atlanta, GA: Society of Biblical Literature, 2006. ISBN 978-1-58983-221-3.
- ..., with Taylor G. Petrey, eds. Biblical Interpretation: History, Context, and Reality. Symposium Series 26. Atlanta, GA: Society of Biblical Literature, 2005. ISBN 978-1-58983-089-9.
- ..., in Cooperation with Marjorie Suchocki, John Quiring, and Katie Goetz, eds. Schleiermacher and Whitehead: Open Systems in Dialogue. Theologische Bibliothek Töpelmann 125. Berlin: de Gruyter, 2004. ISBN 978-3-11-017992-7.
- ... and Christof Landmesser, eds. One Scripture or Many? Canon from Biblical, Theological, and Philosophical Perspectives. Oxford: Oxford University Press, 2004. [+ "Introduction: A New Biblical-Theological Approach to the Unity of the Canon," 1-12.] ISBN 978-0-19-925863-5.
- ... and Kristin De Troyer, with Katie Goetz, eds. Truth: Interdisciplinary Dialogues in a Pluralist Age. Studies in Philosophical Theology 22. Leuven: Peeters, 2003. [+ "Introduction," 1-6.] ISBN 978-90-429-1315-8.
- ..., Christiane Kranich, and Birgit Rehme-Iffert, eds. Schleiermachers Dialektik: Die Liebe zum Wissen in Philosophie und Theologie. Religion in Philosophy and Theology 6. Tübingen: Mohr Siebeck, 2003. ISBN 978-3-16-147989-2.
- ..., Stephen Chapman, and Christof Landmesser, eds. Biblischer Text und theologische Theoriebildung. Biblisch-theologische Studien 44. Neukirchen-Vluyn: Neukirchener Verlag, 2001. ISBN 978-3-7887-1835-0.
