= Michael C. Rea =

American analytic philosopher and professor of philosophy

- Born: Michael Cannon Rea
- Awards: Gifford Lecturer (2017)

Philosophical work
- Era: 21st-century philosophy
- Institutions: University of Notre Dame
- Main interests: Metaphysics, Philosophy of religion
- Notable works: World Without Design; Introduction to the Philosophy of Religion
- Notable ideas: Critique of naturalism, Divine hiddenness

Michael Cannon Rea is an American analytic philosopher and, since 2017, John A. O'Brien Professor of Philosophy at the University of Notre Dame. He delivered the 2017 Gifford Lecture on divine hiddenness.

== Work ==
In World Without Design: The Ontological Consequences of Naturalism, Rea argues that naturalists are not justified in accepting either realism about material objects, or realism about other minds, or materialism.

== Bibliography ==
- World Without Design: The Ontological Consequences of Naturalism. Oxford: Oxford University Press (Clarendon), 2002
- Introduction to the Philosophy of Religion (with Michael Murray). Cambridge: Cambridge University Press, 2008.
- Metaphysics: The Basics, London: Routledge (under contract)

=== Edited books ===
- Material Constitution: A Reader. Lanham, MD: Rowman & Littlefield, 1997. ISBN 978-0-8476-8384-0
- Philosophy of Religion: An Anthology, 5th edition (with Louis P. Pojman). Belmont, CA: Wadsworth, 2007. ISBN 978-0-495-09504-0
- Critical Concepts in Philosophy: Metaphysics, 5 vols., London: Routledge, 2008. ISBN 978-0-415-39751-3
- Oxford Handbook of Philosophical Theology (with Thomas P. Flint). Oxford: Oxford University Press, 2009. ISBN 978-0-19-928920-2
- Analytic Theology: New Essays in Theological Method (with Oliver D. Crisp). Oxford: Oxford University Press, 2009. ISBN 978-0-19-920356-7
- Arguing About Metaphysics. New York: Routledge, 2009. ISBN 978-0-415-95825-7
- Philosophical and Theological Essays on the Trinity (with Thomas McCall), Oxford: Oxford University Press, 2009. ISBN 978-0-19-921621-5
- Oxford Readings in Philosophical Theology, 2 vols. Oxford: Oxford University Press, 2009. ISBN 978-0-19-923746-3
- Divine Evil? The Moral Character of the God of Abraham (with Michael Bergmann and Michael Murray). Oxford University Press, under contract. ISBN 978-0-19-957673-9

Professional and academic associations
| Preceded by Peter van Inwagen | President of the Society of Christian Philosophers; 2013–2016 | Succeeded by Michael Bergmann |
