= Gifford Lectures =

Annual series of lectures on natural theology

The Gifford Lectures (/ˈɡɪfərd/) are an annual series of lectures which were established in 1887 by the will of Adam Gifford, Lord Gifford at the four ancient universities of Scotland: St Andrews, Glasgow, Aberdeen and Edinburgh. Their purpose is to "promote and diffuse the study of natural theology in the widest sense of the term—in other words, the knowledge of God." A Gifford Lectures appointment is one of the most prestigious honours in Scottish academia.

University calendars record that at the four Scottish universities, the Gifford Lectures are to be "public and popular, open not only to students of the university but also to the whole community (for a tuition fee) without matriculation. Besides a general audience, the Lecturer may form a special class of students for the study of the subject, which will be conducted in the usual way and tested by examination and thesis, written and oral". The lectures are normally presented as a series over an academic year and given with the intent that the edited content be published in book form. A number of these works have become classics in the fields of theology or philosophy and the relationship between religion and science.

In 1889, those attending the Gifford Lectures at the University of St. Andrews were described as "mixed" and included women as well as male undergraduates. The first woman appointed was Hannah Arendt who presented in Aberdeen between 1972 and 1974.

A comparable lecture series is the John Locke Lectures, which are delivered annually at the University of Oxford.

== List of lectures ==
=== Aberdeen ===
Year	Speaker(s)	Lecture(s)	ISBN
1889–91	E. B. Tylor	The Natural History of Religion	
1892–94	Andrew Martin Fairbairn	The Philosophy of the Christian Religion	
1896–98	James Ward	Naturalism and Agnosticism	
1898–00	Josiah Royce	The World and the Individual	
1904–06	James Adam	The Religious Teachers of Greece	
1907–08	Hans Driesch	The Science and Philosophy of the Organism	
1911–13	Andrew Seth Pringle-Pattison	The Idea of God in the light of Recent Philosophy	
1914–15	William Ritchie Sorley	Moral Values and the Idea of God	
1927–29	Ernest Barnes	Scientific Theory and Religion	ISBN 9780521730228
1930–32	Etienne Gilson	The Spirit of Medieval Philosophy	
1936–38	Karl Barth	The Knowledge of God and the Service of God according to the Teaching of the Reformation	
1939–40	Arthur Darby Nock	Hellenistic Religion - The Two Phases	
1949–50	Gabriel Marcel	The Mystery of Being and Faith and Reality	ISBN 1-890318-85-X; ISBN 1-890318-86-8
1951–52	Michael Polanyi	Personal Knowledge: Towards a Post-Critical Philosophy	ISBN 0-226-67288-3
1953–54	Paul Tillich	Systematic Theology (3 vols.)	ISBN 0-226-80337-6; ISBN 0-226-80338-4; ISBN 0-226-80339-2
1963–65	Alister Hardy	The Living Stream and The Divine Flame	
1965–67	Raymond Aron	La Conscience historique dans la pensée et dans l'action	
1970–72	Arend Theordore van Leeuwen	The Critique of Heaven and Earth	
1972–74	Hannah Arendt	Life of the Mind	
1982–84	Richard Swinburne	The Evolution of the Soul	ISBN 0-19-823698-0
1984–85	Freeman Dyson	Infinite In All Directions	ISBN 0-06-072889-2
1989–91	Ian Barbour	Religion in an Age of Science	ISBN 0-06-060383-6
1992–93	Jaroslav Pelikan	Christianity and Classical Culture: The Metamorphosis of Natural Theology in the Christian Encounter With Hellenism	ISBN 0-300-06255-9
1994–95	John W. Rogerson	Faith and Criticism in the Work of William Robertson Smith, 1846-1894	
1994–95	M. A. Stewart	New Light and Enlightenment	
1994–95	Peter Jones	Science and Religion before and after Hume	
1994–95	James H. Burns	The Order of Nature	
1994–95	Alexander Broadie	The Shadow of Scotus	
1997–98	Russell Stannard	The God Experiment	
2000–01	John S. Habgood	The Concept of Nature	
2003	Eleonore Stump	Wandering in the Darkness	
2003–04	John Haldane	Mind, Soul and Deity	
2007	Stephen Pattison	Seeing Things: Deepening Relations with Visual Artefacts	ISBN 978-0-334-04149-8
2009	Alister McGrath	A Fine-Tuned Universe: The Quest for God in Science and Theology	ISBN 978-0-664-23310-5
2012	Sarah Coakley	Sacrifice Regained: Evolution, Cooperation and God	
2014	David N. Livingstone	Dealing with Darwin: Place, Politics and Rhetoric in Religious Engagements with Evolution	ISBN 978-1-421-41326-6
2016	Mona Siddiqui	Struggle, Suffering and Hope: Explorations in Islamic and Christian Traditions	ISBN 978-1-316-51854-0
2017	David Novak	Athens and Jerusalem: God, Humans, and Nature	ISBN 978-1-487-50617-9
2018	N. T. Wright	Discerning the Dawn: History, Eschatology and New Creation, published as History and Eschatology: Jesus and the Promise of Natural Theology, 2019	ISBN 978-1-4813-0962-2
2022	John Dupré	A Brief History of Form	
2022	Tim Whitmarsh	Religion and Ancient Mediterranean Thought	
2022	Lisa Sideris	Unnatural Theology in the Anthropocene	
2022	Robert McCauley	Religions and their Cognitive Kin	
2022	John Witte Jr.	A New Calvinist Reformation of Rights	
2024	Miri Rubin	The Feminine and the Religious Imagination	
2025	Miroslav Volf	Amor Mundi: God and the Character of Our Relation to the World	
2026	Jeremy Begbie	TBC	
TBD	Catherine Pickstock	TBC	

=== Edinburgh ===
Year	Speaker(s)	Lecture(s)	ISBN
1889–90	James Hutchison Stirling	Philosophy and Theology	
1891	George Gabriel Stokes	Natural Theology	
1892–94	Otto Pfleiderer	Philosophy and Development of Religion	
1896–98	Cornelis Tiele	On the Elements of the Science of Religion	ISBN 0-404-60480-3
1900–02	William James	The Varieties of Religious Experience	ISBN 0-679-64011-8
1909–10	William Warde Fowler	The Religious Experience of the Roman People	ISBN 0-8154-0372-0
1911–12	Bernard Bosanquet	The Principle of Individuality and Value	ISBN 0-527-10036-6
1913–14	Henri Bergson	The Problem of Personality	
1915–16	William Mitchell Ramsay	Asianic Elements in Greek Civilization	ISBN 0-89005-173-9
1919–21	George Stout	Mind and Matter pub. 1931	
1921–23	Andrew Seth Pringle-Pattison	Studies in the Philosophy of Religion	ISBN 0-404-60474-9
1923–35	James George Frazer	The Worship of Nature	ISBN 1-56459-532-3
1926–27	Arthur Eddington	The Nature of the Physical World	ISBN 0-472-06015-5
1927–28	Alfred North Whitehead	Process and Reality: An Essay in Cosmology	ISBN 0-02-934570-7
1928–29	John Dewey	The Quest for Certainty: A Study of the Relation of Knowledge and Action	ISBN 1-4179-0845-9
1934–35	Albert Schweitzer	The Problem of Natural Theology and Natural Ethics (unpublished)	
1937–38	Charles Sherrington	Man on His Nature	ISBN 0-521-06436-8
1938–40	Reinhold Niebuhr	The Nature and Destiny of Man: A Christian Interpretation	ISBN 0-664-25709-7
1947–49	Christopher Dawson	Vol. 1 Religion and Culture Vol. 2 Religion and the Rise of Western Culture (1950)	ISBN 0-404-60498-6; ISBN 0-385-42110-9
1949–50	Niels Bohr	Causality and Complementarity: Epistemological Lessons of Studies in Atomic Physics	ISBN 1-881987-14-0
1950–52	Charles Earle Raven	Natural Religion and Christian Theology	
1952–53	Arnold J. Toynbee	An Historian's Approach to Religion	ISBN 0-19-215260-2
1954–55	Rudolf Bultmann	History and Eschatology: The Presence of Eternity	ISBN 0-8371-8123-2
1961–62	John Baillie	The Sense of the Presence of God	
1970–71	Eric Lionel Mascall	The Openness of Being	ISBN 0-232-51159-4
1973–74	Owen Chadwick	The Secularisation of the European Mind in the 19th Century	ISBN 0-521-39829-0
1974–76	Stanley Jaki	The Road of Science and the Ways to God	ISBN 0-226-39145-0
1978–79	Sir John Eccles	The Human Mystery and The Human Psyche	ISBN 0-387-09954-9
1979–80	Ninian Smart	The Varieties of Religious Identity, published as Beyond Ideology: Religion and the Future of Western Civilisation	ISBN 0-06-067402-4
1980–81	Seyyed Hossein Nasr	Knowledge and the Sacred	ISBN 0-7914-0177-4
1981–82	Iris Murdoch	Metaphysics as a Guide to Morals	ISBN 0-14-017232-7
1983–84	David Daiches	God and the Poets	ISBN 0-19-812825-8
1984–85	Jurgen Moltmann	God in Creation: A New Theology of Creation and the Spirit of God	ISBN 0-8006-2823-3
1985–86	Paul Ricoeur	Oneself as another	ISBN 0-226-71329-6
1986–87	John Hick	An Interpretation of Religion	ISBN 0-300-10668-8
1987–88	Alasdair MacIntyre	Three Rival Versions of Moral Enquiry	ISBN 0-7156-2337-0
1988–89	Raimon Panikkar	Trinity and Theism	ISBN 978-1-57075-855-3
1989–90	Mary Douglas	Claims on God: published (much revised) as In the Wilderness	ISBN 1-85075-444-6
1990 Spring	Mary Midgley	Science and Salvation: published as Science As Salvation	ISBN 0-415-107733
1991–92	Annemarie Schimmel	Deciphering the Signs of God: A Phenomenological Approach to Islam	ISBN 978-0791419823
1992–93	Martha C. Nussbaum	Upheavals of Thought: A Theory of the Emotions	
1993–94	John Polkinghorne	Science and Christian Belief: Theological Reflections of a Bottom-up Thinker	ISBN 0-281-04714-6
1995–96	G. A. Cohen	If you're an Egalitarian, how come you're so Rich?	ISBN 0-674-00693-3
1996–97	Richard Sorabji	Emotions and How to Cope with Them, published as Emotion and Peace of Mind: From Stoic Agitation to Christian Temptation	ISBN 0-19-825005-3
1997–98	Holmes Rolston III	Genes, Genesis and God	ISBN 0-521-64674-X
1998–99	Charles Taylor	Living in a Secular Age, published as A Secular Age	ISBN 0-674-02676-4
1999–00	David Tracy	This side of God	
2000–01	Onora O'Neill	Autonomy and Trust in Bioethics	
2001–02	Mohammed Arkoun	Inaugurating a Critique of Islamic Reason	
2002–03	Michael Ignatieff	The Lesser Evil: Political Ethics in an Age of Terror	ISBN 0-691-11751-9
2003–04	J. Wentzel van Huyssteen	Alone in the World? Human Uniqueness in Science and Theology	ISBN 0-8028-3246-6
2004–05	Margaret Anstee; Stephen Toulmin; Noam Chomsky	Delivered a series of lectures dedicated to Edward Said who was scheduled to give the 2004–05 series before his death in 2003	
2005–06	Jean Bethke Elshtain	Sovereign God, Sovereign State, Sovereign Self	
2006–07	Simon Conway Morris	Darwin 's Compass: How Evolution Discovers the Song of Creation	
2006–07	Jonathan Riley-Smith	The Crusades and Christianity	
2007–08	Alexander Nehamas	"Because it was he, because it was I": Friendship and Its Place in Life	
2008	Robert M. Veatch	Hipprocratic, Religious and Secular Medical Ethics: The Point of Conflict	
2008–09	Diana Eck	The Age of Pluralism [April–May 2009]	
2009–10	Michael Gazzaniga	Mental Life [October 2009]	
2009–10	Terry Eagleton	The God Debate [March 2010]	
2010–11	Peter Harrison	Science, Religion and the Modern World, published as The Territories of Science and Religion	ISBN 978-0226184487
2010–11	Gordon Brown	The Future of Jobs and Justice	
2011–12	Lord Sutherland of Houndwood	David Hume and Civil Society	
2011–12	Diarmaid MacCulloch	Silence in Christian History: the witness of Holmes' Dog	
2011–12	Jim Al-Khalili	Alan Turing: Legacy of a Code Breaker – one-off joint lecture between the Royal Society of Edinburgh and the School of Informatics	
2012–13	Bruno Latour	"Once Out of Nature" - Natural Religion as a Pleonasm	
2012–13	Steven Pinker	The Better Angels of Our Nature: A History of Violence and Humanity	
2013–14	Onora O'Neill	From Toleration to Freedom of Expression	
2013–14	Rowan Williams	Making representations: religious faith and the habits of language	
2013–14	Catherine O'Regan	"What is Caesar's?" Adjudicating faith in modern constitutional democracies	
2014–15	Jeremy Waldron	One Another's Equals: The Basis of Human Equality	
2014–15	Helga Nowotny	Beyond Innovation. Temporalities. Re-use. Emergence.	
2015–16	Kathryn Tanner	Christianity and the New Spirit of Capitalism	
2016–17	Richard English	Nationalism, Terrorism and Religion	
2016–17	Jeffrey Stout	Religion Unbound: Ideals and Powers from Cicero to King	
2017–18	Agustín Fuentes	Why We Believe: evolution, making meaning, and the development of human natures	
2017–18	Elaine Howard Ecklund	Science and Religion in Global Public Life	
2018–19	Mary Beard	The Ancient World and Us: From Fear and Loathing to Enlightenment and Ethics	
2019–20	Michael Welker	In God's Image: Anthropology	
2020–21	David Hempton	Networks, Nodes, and Nuclei in the History of Christianity, c. 1500-2020	
2021–22	Susan Neiman	Heroism for a Time of Victims	
2022–23	John Dupré	A Process Perspective on Human Life	
2023–24	Cornel West	A Jazz-soaked Philosophy for our Catastrophic Times: From Socrates to Coltrane	
2024–25	Alexandra Walsham	Religious Movements: Motion and Emotion in Early Modern Christian History	
2025–26	Paula Fredriksen	The Conversions of Christianity	
2026–27	Alondra Nelson	TBC	

=== Glasgow ===
Year	Speaker(s)	Lecture(s)	ISBN
1888–92	Friedrich Max Müller	1888: Natural Religion Vol. 1 & 2; 1890: Physical Religion; 1891: Anthropological Religion: 1892: Theosophy or Psychological Religion	
1892–96	John Caird	The Fundamental Ideas of Christianity Vol. 1 & 2	
1896–98	Alexander Balmain Bruce	The Moral Order of the World and The Providential Order of the World	
1900–02	Edward Caird	The Evolution of Theology in the Greek Philosophers	
1914	Arthur Balfour	Theism and Humanism	ISBN 1-58742-005-8
1916–18	Samuel Alexander	Space, Time, and Deity	ISBN 0-7661-8701-2; ISBN 0-7661-8702-0
1922	Arthur Balfour	Theism and Thought	
1927–28	J. S. Haldane	The Sciences and Philosophy	ISBN 0-404-60479-X
1932–34	William Temple	Nature, Man and God	
1952–54	John Macmurray	The Form of the Personal Vol.1 & 2: The Self as Agent and Persons in Relation	ISBN 1-57392-337-0; ISBN 1-57392-625-6
1959	Carl Friedrich von Weizsäcker	The Relevance of Science	
1965	Herbert Butterfield	Historical Writing and Christian Beliefs and Human Beliefs and the Development of Historical Writing	
1970	Richard William Southern	The Rise and Fall of the Medieval System of Religious Thought	
1974-76	Basil Mitchell	Morality, Religious and Secular	
1981	Stephen R. L. Clark	From Athens to Jerusalem	
1985	Carl Sagan	The Search for Who We Are	ISBN 1-59420-107-2
1986	Donald M. MacKay	Behind the Eye	
1988	Don Cupitt	Nature and Culture	
1988	Richard Dawkins	Worlds in Microcosm	
1992	Mary Warnock	Imagination and Understanding, published as Imagination and Time	ISBN 0-631-19019-8
1993–94	Keith Ward	Religion and Revelation	ISBN 978-0-19-826375-3
1995–96	Geoffrey Cantor; John Hedley Brooke	Reconstructing Nature	
1997–98	R. J. Berry	Gods, Genes, Greens and Everything	
1999–00	Ralph McInerny	Characters in Search of Their Author	
2001	Lynne Baker; Brian Hebblethwaite; Philip Johnson-Laird; George Lakoff; Michael Ruse	The Nature and Limits of Human Understanding	
2003–04	Simon Blackburn	Reason's Empire	
2005	Lenn Goodman; Abdulaziz Sachedina; John E. Hare	Thou Shall Love Thy Neighbor as Thyself	
2007–08	David Fergusson	Religion and Its Recent Critics published as Faith and Its Critics: A Conversation	ISBN 978-0-19-956938-0
2008–09	Charles Taylor	The Necessity of Secularist Regimes	
2009–10	Gianni Vattimo	The End of Reality	
2012	Vilayanur Ramachandran	Body and Mind: Insights from Neuroscience	
2014	Jean-Luc Marion	Givenness and Revelation	
2015	Perry Schmidt-Leukel	Interreligious Theology: The Future Shape of Theology	
2016	Sean M. Carroll	The Big Picture: On the Origins of Life, Meaning, and the Universe Itself	
2018	Judith Butler	My Life, Your Life: Equality and the Philosophy of Non-Violence	
2019	Kevin Hart	Philosophia and Religions	
2019	Mark Pagel	Wired for Culture: The Origins of the Human Social Mind, or Why Humans Occupied the World	
2020	T.J. Clark	Heaven on Earth: Painting and the Life to Come	
2022	Manthia Diawara; Terri Geis	Towards a New Sacred	
2022	Jack Halberstam	Collapse, Demolition, and the Queer Geographies and Unworlding: An Aesthetics of Collapse	
2023	Mark Williams	The Japanese Religious Melting Pot and the Significance of Christianity	
2023	Jean-Luc Marion; Kevin Hart	Revelation and Contemplation	
2025	Jochen Schmidt	Precarious Humility, Word Crises and World Crises	

=== St Andrews ===
Year	Speaker(s)	Lecture(s)	ISBN
1889–90	Andrew Lang	The Making of Religion	
1890–92	Edward Caird	The Evolution of Religion	
1894–96	Lewis Campbell	Religion in Greek Literature	
1899–01	Rodolfo Lanciani	New Tales of Old Rome	
1902–04	Richard Haldane	The Pathway to Reality	ISBN 0-404-60459-5
1907–09	James Ward	The Realm of Ends or Pluralism and Theism	
1911–13	James George Frazer	The Belief in Immortality	
1914–16	J. A. Thomson	The System of Animate Nature	
1917–19	William Ralph Inge	The Philosophy of Plotinus	ISBN 1-59244-284-6
1919–20	Lewis Richard Farnell	Greek Hero Cults and Ideas of Immortality	
1921–22	C. Lloyd Morgan	Emergent Evolution (1923) and Life, Mind, and Spirit (1925)	ISBN 0-404-60468-4
1924–25	Lewis Richard Farnell	The Attributes of God	
1926–28	Alfred Edward Taylor	The faith of a moralist, The Theological Implications of Morality; Natural Theology and the Positive Religions (1930)	
1929–30	Charles Gore	The Philosophy of the Good Life (1930)	
1930–32	Robert Ranulph Marett	Faith, Hope & Charity in Primitive Religion	
1935–36	Hensley Henson	Christian Morality	
1936–37	Werner Jaeger	The Theology of the Early Greek Philosophers (1936)	
1937–38	William G. de Burgh	From Morality to Religion	
1938	Joseph Bidez	Plato and the Orient	
1939–40	Richard Kroner	The Primacy of Faith	
1946–48	Emil Brunner	Christianity and Civilisation	
1949–50	Herbert James Paton	The Modern Predicament	
1951–53	Brand Blanshard	Reason, Belief and Goodness	
1953–55	C. A. Campbell	On Selfhood and Godhood	
1955–56	Werner Heisenberg	Physics and Philosophy: The Revolution in Modern Science	ISBN 1-57392-694-9
1959–60	Georg Henrik von Wright	Norm and Action (1963) and The Varieties of Goodness (1963)	
1962–64	Henry Chadwick	Authority in the Early Church	
1964–66	John Findlay	The Discipline of the Cave (1966), and The Transcendence of the Cave (1967)	ISBN 978-0-04-111002-9
1967–69	Robert Charles Zaehner	Concordant Discord. The Interdependence of Faiths.	
1969–71	William Homan Thorpe	Animal Nature and Human Nature	
1972–73	Alfred Ayer	The Central Questions of Philosophy	ISBN 0-03-013116-2
1975–77	Reijer Hooykaas	Fact, Faith and Fiction in the Development of Science	
1977–78	David Stafford-Clark	Myth, Magic and Denial	
1979–80	Frederick Copleston	Religion and the One: Philosophies East and West	
1980–81	Gregory Vlastos	Socrates: Ironist and Moral Philosopher	
1982–83	Donald Geoffrey Charlton	New Images of the Natural, 1750-1800	
1983–84	John Macquarrie	In Search of Deity	
1984–85	Adolf Grünbaum	Psychoanalytic Theory and Science	
1986–87	Antony Flew	The Logic of Mortality	
1988–89	Walter Burkert	Tracks of Biology and the Creation of Sense	
1990–91	Hilary Putnam	Renewing Philosophy	
1992–93	Arthur Peacocke	Nature, God and Humanity	
1992–93	Roger Penrose	The Question of Physical Reality	
1995	Nicholas Wolterstorff	Thomas Reid and the Story of Epistemology	
1996–97	Michael Dummett	Thought and Reality	
1998–99	Robert Merrihew Adams	God and Being	
1998–99	Marilyn McCord Adams	The Coherence of Christology	
2000–01	Stanley Hauerwas	With the Grain of the Universe: The Church's Witness and Natural Theology	ISBN 1-58743-016-9
2002	Peter van Inwagen	The Problem of Evil	ISBN 978-0-19-954397-7
2004–05	Alvin Plantinga	Science and Religion: Conflict or Concord	
2007	Martin Rees	21st Century Science: Cosmic Perspective and Terrestrial Challenges	
2010	Roger Scruton	The Face of God	
2012	Denis Alexander	Genes, Determinism and God	
2015	Linda Zagzebski	Exemplarist Virtue Theory published as Exemplarist Moral Theory	ISBN 978-0-19-065584-6
2017	Michael Rea	Though the Darkness Hide Thee: Seeking the Face of the Invisible God	
2019	Mark Johnston	Ontotheology as Antidote for Idolatry	
2021	Oliver O'Donovan	The Disappearance of Ethics	
2024	Clare Carlisle	Transcendence for Beginners: Life Writing and Philosophy	
2026	John Swinton	The Symptom’s Secret: An Apocalyptic Theology of Mental Health	

== Support from Templeton Religion Trust ==
Established at the behest of John Templeton, the Gifford Lectures website was designed to increase the strategic impact of the Gifford program. Developed and managed by Templeton Press through May 2021, the website is now managed through a grant from Templeton Religion Trust.

== Bibliography ==
- Stanley Jaki, Lord Gifford and His Lectures: A Centenary Retrospect (1987). Scottish Academic Press, ISBN 0-7073-0465-2.
- Larry Witham, The Measure of God: Our Century-Long Struggle to Reconcile Science & Religion (2005), HarperSanFrancisco hardcover: ISBN 0-06-059191-9; reprinted as The Measure of God: History's Greatest Minds Wrestle with Reconciling Science and Religion (2006), paperback: ISBN 0-06-085833-8.
