= Terence Cuneo (philosopher) =

American philosopher

- Education: Fordham University
- Occupation: Philosopher

Terence Cuneo is an American philosopher. He is the Marsh Chair Professor of Intellectual and Moral Philosophy in the department of philosophy at the University of Vermont.
