= George I. Mavrodes =

American philosopher (1926–2019)

George I. Mavrodes (November 23, 1926 – July 31, 2019) was an American philosopher and professor emeritus of philosophy at the University of Michigan.

== Biography ==
Mavrodes received his B.S. degree (1945) from Oregon State College, his B.D. degree (1953) from Western Baptist Theological Seminary, and his M.A. (1960) and PhD (1961) degrees in philosophy from the University of Michigan. He retired on March 31, 1995, being named professor emeritus of philosophy after thirty three years at the University of Michigan.

== Work ==
Mavrodes is the author of Belief in God: A Study in the Epistemology of Religion (1970) and Revelation in Religious Belief (1988). He has nearly one hundred articles covering such topics as revelation, omnipotence, miracles, resurrection, personal identity and survival of death, and faith and reason, as well as ethics and social policy issues that intersect with religion and morality—abortion, pacifism, the just war, and nuclear deterrence. Mavrodes has served as president of the Society for Philosophy of Religion and the Society of Christian Philosophers, and as a member of the executive committee of the American Theological Society. Mavrodes has held editorial positions with American Philosophical Quarterly, Faith and Philosophy, and The Reformed Journal.

One of his more widely studied works is titled "Religion and the Queerness of Morality", where he questions whether genuine moral obligation could make sense in a world as described in Russell's "A Free Man's Worship".

He distinguished two major ways of understanding evolution. The first is the "naturalistic" way of understanding evolution as "explicable entirely in terms of natural law without reference to a divine intention or intervention." But a "theistic" understanding of evolution holds that "there was a divine teleology in this process, a divine direction at each crucial stage in accordance with divine plan or intention." In other words, a theistic understanding of evolution holds that although evolution occurred, God still directed evolution. Evolution is merely the tool of God's design. Evolution, and even the great struggle for existence that "selects" some animals to survive and others to die, is the instrument with which God designs human beings and other animals. On this view, Darwinian evolution is consistent with the belief that God, through evolution, produced human beings for a purpose. Other philosophers, such as Henri Bergson and Pierre Teilhard de Chardin, have also argued that the process of evolution is not blind and random, but directed and purposeful.

== Bibliography ==
=== Author ===
- Belief in God: A Study in the Epistemology of Religion (Random House, 1970)
- Revelation in Religious Belief (Temple University Press, 1988)

=== Editor ===
- Problems and Perspectives in the Philosophy of Religion (Allyn and Bacon Inc., 1967)
- The Rationality of Belief in God (Prentice Hall, 1970)

== See also ==
- American philosophy
- List of American philosophers
