= Philosophical theology =

Form of theology

Philosophical theology is both a branch and form of theology in which philosophical methods are used in developing or analyzing theological concepts. It therefore includes natural theology as well as philosophical treatments of orthodox and heterodox theology. Philosophical theology is also closely related to the philosophy of religion.

== Definitions ==
Mortimer J. Adler distinguishes philosophical theology from natural theology. While the former is, according to him, theology done by non-Christian philosophers, the latter is done by those who are already Christians and are actually trying to find rational proofs for their faith. Adler thinks that the term "natural theology" is a misnomer and is actually apologetics, and cites as an example Thomas Aquinas' Summa Contra Gentiles, addressed to the Jews and Moors in Spain. Though written as if it were philosophical theology, was in fact, apologetics and not philosophical theology, as it was written by a Christian and not by a pagan. In Adler's view, few books on natural theology are sound works of philosophical theology because they are not written by pagans. An example of philosophical theology, according to Adler, is Aristotle's theology as found in his Metaphysics.

Contrary to Adler's view, Charles Taliaferro and Chad Meister think that doing philosophical theology may not be restricted by whether the doer is an insider to faith or not, for anyone doing philosophical theology only tries to consider whether a theological doctrine can make philosophical sense or not. But, as Adler points out, a pagan doing philosophical theology and coming to a theological conclusion has a different route than an insider using philosophy to examine or seek to understand his faith.

== Philosophy and theology ==
The relationship between theology and philosophy has been long-debated and discussed within the Christian tradition. Tertullian, an influential early Christian theologian and apologist, believed that philosophy has little to do with theology, arguing that the use of philosophy often corrupted theology, leading to unorthodox beliefs that were not grounded in the early Christian tradition. He famously asked the question 'What has Athens to do with Jerusalem?'. (Athens symbolized the philosophical approach because of its role as a leading center of Hellenistic philosophy, while Jerusalem represented Christianity because of its role as an important location and intellectual centre in the early church.)

Other leaders, however, saw a closer relationship between philosophy and theology. Justin Martyr looked at people like Heraclitus and Socrates as possessing the divine light of revelation and believed them to be true philosophers. Justin saw Christianity as the True Philosophy and argued for Christianity using philosophical methods and terminology. St. Augustine, who became one of the most influential theologians in history and whose works laid the foundation for much of Western philosophy (as well as much of Western theology), espoused a more middle-of-the-road, moderate approach. He argued that philosophy and theology often complement each other while at the same time cautioning that philosophy should not always be used in theological discourse. Instead, he argued, one should make sure that a philosophical approach toward a particular issue was grounded in prior Christian commitments.

The disciplines of Philosophy and Theology have often been connected, with theologians and philosophers interacting and debating similar and sometimes overlapping issues. Philosophy played a key role in the formation of Western theology. Thomas Aquinas, one of the most influential philosophers and theologians in history, for instance, borrowed much of his concepts from Aristotle. Scholasticism dominated both the philosophical and theological landscape in the Middle Ages, with theologians such as Aquinas, Anselm of Canterbury, Duns Scotus, William of Ockham, Peter Abelard, Bonaventure, and Albertus Magnus playing key roles in both philosophy and theology.

In modern times, Anthony Thiselton has shown in his Fusion of Horizons the role that philosophy has played in the interpretation of scriptures, i.e., in the field of hermeneutics. Philosophy provides interpretive grids for the apprehension of revelation. There are others, like Sadhu Sundar Singh, for instance, who believe that it is the illumination of the Holy Spirit that gives the truest meaning of revelation. Yet, one can't fail to see that cultural grids play an important role in the development of theology.

Many contemporary philosophers continue to write and argue from a Christian perspective, with Christian concepts undergirding their philosophical work. In recent decades, some of the most well-known philosophers who have written from a Christian perspective are Alvin Plantinga, Alasdair MacIntyre, William Lane Craig, Jean-Luc Marion, Paul Tillich, Charles Taylor, Richard Swinburne, and James K. A. Smith.

== Foundations of modern philosophical theology ==
During the 18th, 19th centuries, and 20th centuries, many theologians reacted against the modernist, Enlightenment, and positivist attacks on Christian theology. Some existentialistic or neo-orthodox Protestant intellectuals like the Swiss Reformed theologian Karl Barth turned away from philosophy (called fideism) and argued that faith should be based strictly upon divine revelation. A popular approach in some circles is the approach of Reformed epistemologists, such as Alvin Plantinga and Nicholas Wolterstorff, who assert that belief in God might be foundational (or, properly 'basic') and warranted without the need for logical or evidential justification, like belief in other minds or the external world, rather than inferentially derived from other beliefs. It can, however, be subject to defeaters, rationally requiring that one give up the belief. Many other philosophers and theologians, however, disagree with this perspective and provide alternative views. Many other theologians have turned to continental philosophy, analytic philosophy, and postmodern philosophy in attempts to analyze and reframe Christian theology in contemporary contexts.

== Philosophical theology ==
While philosophical theology can denote an approach to theology which is philosophical in nature, it can also denote a specific area of theology in which philosophical methods and terminology are used to analyze theological concepts. One task of philosophical theologians is to attempt to reconcile certain aspects of Christian doctrine with developments in philosophy. One question concerns how to prove the existence and nature of God. The knowledge of God is dealt with in the epistemology of religion, usually a subset of philosophy of religion.

There are many different perspectives with philosophical theology on such questions. In modern times process theology, open theism, and Christian panentheism have tried to look at God as the Being who is not only the Source and Ground of all beings but also influenced by the people and processes of the world which he created and which he belongs—rejecting or at least amending the classical medieval doctrine of impassibility.

== Christology ==
Christology raises a number of philosophical questions, such as how the divine can incarnate as a human, how the eternal can enter the temporal, and how the divine and the human can be united in one yet remain distinct. Such questions led to earlier heresies like Arianism, Sabellianism, Docetism, etc. Often, one's epistemic theory can play an important role in how one answers such questions. There is, for instance, sometimes a clash between those who want to emphasize the rational foundation for theology and those who want to emphasize the empirical foundation for theology. There has also been a contrast made between Christology from above and Christology from below. The former emphasizes the divine side of Christ; the latter, the human side. The human side obviously tends to look at it more empirically. The Scriptures call the Incarnation a mystery of godliness. It baffles human imagination, leading many to call it a divine mystery. Yet, philosophical theologians argue that it is also important to find a philosophical ground for asserting both the divinity and humanity of Christ.

Other theologians, however, like Rudolph Bultmann, read the New Testament documents in mythic terms which needed to be stripped back so that the essential truths could be laid bare, a hermeneutical approach they called demythologization. This included a clear distinction between the (in their view, unimportant) Jesus of history and the (all-important) Christ of faith (see also the Quest for the Historical Jesus).

== See also ==
- Analytic theology
- Christian apologetics
- Christian ethics
- Christian philosophy
- Christian theology
- Faith and rationality
- Neoplatonism and Christianity
- Philosophical anthropology
- Philosophical theism
- Religious epistemology
- Scholasticism
