= Lists of philosophers =

This is a list of lists of philosophers, organized by subarea, nationality, religion, and time period.

== Lists of philosophers by subfield ==
- List of aestheticians
- List of critical theorists
- List of environmental philosophers
- List of epistemologists
- List of ethicists
- List of existentialists
- List of feminist philosophers
- List of humanists
- List of logicians
- List of metaphysicians
- List of social and political philosophers
- List of post-structuralists
- List of phenomenologists
- List of philosophers of language
- List of philosophers of mind
- List of philosophers of religion
- List of philosophers of science
- List of political philosophers
- List of political theorists
- List of rationalists
- List of utilitarians

== Lists of philosophers by language or nationality ==
- List of Afghan philosophers
- List of British philosophers
- List of Canadian philosophers
- List of Chinese philosophers
- List of Finnish philosophers
- List of French philosophers
- List of German-language philosophers
- List of Icelandic philosophers
- List of Indian philosophers
- List of Iranian philosophers
- List of Italian philosophers
- List of Jewish American philosophers
- List of Korean philosophers
- List of Kurdish philosophers
- List of Lithuanian philosophers
- List of Romanian philosophers
- List of Russian philosophers
- List of Slovene philosophers
- List of Turkish philosophers

== Lists of philosophers by religion ==
- List of atheist philosophers
- List of Catholic philosophers and theologians
- List of Muslim philosophers

== Lists of philosophers by time period ==
- List of ancient Greek philosophers
  - List of ancient Platonists
  - List of Cynic philosophers
  - List of Epicurean philosophers
  - List of pre-Socratic philosophers
  - List of Stoic philosophers

=== Lists of philosophers by century ===
- List of philosophers born in the centuries BC
- List of philosophers born in the 1st through 10th centuries
- List of philosophers born in the 11th through 14th centuries
- List of philosophers born in the 15th and 16th centuries
- List of philosophers born in the 17th century
- List of philosophers born in the 18th century
- List of philosophers born in the 19th century
- List of philosophers born in the 20th century

=== Timelines ===
- Timeline of Eastern philosophers
- Timeline of Western philosophers

== Miscellaneous ==
- List of women philosophers
- List of nicknames of philosophers
- Deaths of philosophers
