= List of philosophers of mind =

This is a list of philosophers of mind.

== A ==
- Abhinavagupta
- Samuel Alexander
- G. E. M. Anscombe
- Louise Antony
- Aristotle
- David Malet Armstrong
- Thomas Aquinas
- J. L. Austin
- Anita Avramides

== B ==
- Alexander Bain
- Lynne Rudder Baker
- Thomas Baldwin
- Frederic Bartlett
- Gregory Bateson
- Ansgar Beckermann
- Balthasar Bekker
- Henri Bergson
- George Berkeley
- Jose Luis Bermudez
- Ned Block
- Margaret Boden
- Paul Boghossian
- Emil du Bois-Reymond
- Hans-Werner Bothe
- Robert Brandom
- Franz Brentano
- C. D. Broad
- Berit Brogaard
- David H. M. Brooks
- Thomas Brown
- Jerome Bruner
- Tyler Burge

== C ==
- Elisabeth Camp
- Peter Carruthers
- David Chalmers
- Noam Chomsky
- Patricia Churchland
- Paul Churchland
- Andy Clark
- Tim Crane

== D ==
- Donald Davidson
- Petrus de Ibernia
- Daniel Dennett
- René Descartes
- Dharmakirti
- Thomas Dick
- Merlin Donald
- Gerhard Dorn
- Fred Dretske

== E ==
- Gareth Evans

== F ==
- Herbert Feigl
- Edward Feser
- Carrie Figdor
- Owen Flanagan
- Jerry Fodor
- Harry Frankfurt

== G ==
- Franz Joseph Gall
- Shaun Gallagher
- Robert Maximilian de Gaynesford
- Tamar Gendler
- Brie Gertler
- Arnold Geulincx
- Celia Green
- Patricia Greenspan
- Philip Goff
- Alvin Goldman
- Elizabeth Grosz
- Robert Van Gulick
- Samuel Guttenplan
- Þorsteinn Gylfason

== H ==
- Peter Hacker
- Donna Haraway
- Gilbert Harman
- Horace Romano Harré
- David Bentley Hart
- David Hartley
- Friedrich Hayek
- Georg Wilhelm Friedrich Hegel
- Martin Heidegger
- John Heil
- William Hirstein
- Thomas Hobbes
- Douglas Hofstadter
- David Hume
- Susan Hurley
- Edmund Husserl
- Edwin Hutchins
- Thomas Huxley

== J ==
- Frank Cameron Jackson
- William James
- Mark Johnson
- Ward Jones

== K ==
- Immanuel Kant
- Bernardo Kastrup
- Kundakunda
- Friedrich Kambartel
- Anthony Kenny
- Jaegwon Kim
- Martha Klein
- Uriah Kriegel
- Saul Kripke
- Jiddu Krishnamurti

== L ==
- Stephen Laurence
- George Lakoff
- Timothy Leary
- Gottfried Leibniz
- Ernest Lepore
- Joseph Levine
- David Kellogg Lewis
- John Locke
- Béatrice Longuenesse
- William Lycan

== M ==
- Fiona Macpherson
- Catherine Malabou
- Norman Malcolm
- Nicolas Malebranche
- Merab Mamardashvili
- Michael G. F. Martin
- Humberto Maturana
- Ron McClamrock
- John McDowell
- Colin McGinn
- George Herbert Mead
- Alexius Meinong
- Angela Mendelovici
- Maurice Merleau-Ponty
- Julien Offray de La Mettrie
- Thomas Metzinger
- Ruth Millikan
- Marvin Minsky
- George Edward Moore
- C. Lloyd Morgan
- Jurij Moskvitin

== N ==
- Nagarjuna
- Thomas Nagel
- Alva Noe
- Claude Nowell

== P ==
- David Papineau
- Derek Parfit
- Christopher Peacocke
- John Perry
- Gualtiero Piccinini
- Ullin Place
- Plato
- Karl Popper
- Hilary Putnam
- Zenon Pylyshyn

== Q ==
- Willard Van Orman Quine

== R ==
- Thomas Reid
- Daniel N. Robinson
- Richard Rorty
- David M. Rosenthal
- Gilbert Ryle

== S ==
- Sana Ahmad
- Susanna Schellenberg
- Marya Schechtman
- Tad Schmaltz
- John Searle
- Wilfrid Sellars
- Adi Shankaracharya
- Eric Schwitzgebel
- Sydney Shoemaker
- Bradd Shore
- Susanna Siegel
- Charles Siewert
- Aaron Sloman
- J. J. C. Smart
- David Sosa
- Baruch Spinoza
- Timothy Sprigge
- Stephen Stich
- Daniel Stoljar
- Galen Strawson
- P. F. Strawson

== T ==
- Ken Taylor
- Evan Thompson
- Ernst Tugendhat
- Colin Murray Turbayne
- Alan Turing
- Mark Turner
- Michael Tye

== U ==
- Peter Unger

== V ==
- Francisco Varela
- Vasubandhu
- Heinz von Foerster
- Ernst von Glasersfeld

== W ==
- John B. Watson
- Mary Warnock, Baroness Warnock
- Michael Wheeler
- Timothy Williamson
- Robert Anton Wilson
- John Wisdom
- Ludwig Wittgenstein
- Georg Henrik von Wright

== Y ==
- Stephen Yablo
- Wang Yangming

== Z ==
- Dan Zahavi
- Edward N. Zalta
- Zhuang Zhou
- Paul Ziff
