= List of epistemologists =

This is a list of epistemologists, that is, people who theorize about the nature of knowledge, belief formation and the nature of justification. This list is by necessity incomplete, since countless other philosophers also deal with epistemological issues in their work.

== Ancient philosophy ==
- Aenesidemus
- Augustine of Hippo
- Agrippa the Skeptic
- Aristotle
- Democritus
- Epicurus
- Heraclitus
- Mencius
- Mozi
- Nausiphanes
- Parmenides
- Plato
- Protagoras
- Pyrrho
- Sextus Empiricus
- Socrates
- Theodorus the Atheist
- Theophrastus
- Timon of Phlius
- Zeno of Citium
- Xenophanes

== Medieval philosophy ==
- Thomas Aquinas
- Madhwacharya
- Avicenna
- Averroes
- Roger Bacon
- Al-Farabi
- Marsilio Ficino
- Gaṅgeśa
- Al-Ghazali
- Al-Kindi
- Francisco Suárez
- Ibn Taymiyya
- William of Ockham
- Jayatirtha
- Vyasaraja Tirtha

== Modern philosophy ==
- Francis Bacon
- Thomas Bayes
- Pierre Bayle
- George Berkeley
- William Kingdon Clifford
- René Descartes
- John Dewey
- James Frederick Ferrier
- G.W.F. Hegel
- Thomas Hobbes
- David Hume
- Gottfried Wilhelm Leibniz
- John Locke
- Michel de Montaigne
- William James
- Immanuel Kant
- Søren Kierkegaard
- Nicolas Malebranche
- Charles Sanders Peirce
- Karl Leonhard Reinhold
- George Santayana
- Friedrich Wilhelm Joseph Schelling
- F. C. S. Schiller
- Friedrich Schlegel
- Friedrich Schleiermacher
- Baruch Spinoza
- Rudolf Steiner
- Giambattista Vico

== Contemporary philosophy ==
- William Alston
- G. E. M. Anscombe
- Robert Audi
- A. J. Ayer
- Gregory Bateson
- Harry Binswanger
- Laurence Bonjour
- Mario Bunge
- Jonathan Dancy
- Gilles Deleuze
- Keith DeRose
- Fred Dretske
- Margaret Elizabeth Egan
- Catherine Elgin
- Paul Feyerabend
- Richard Fumerton
- Edmund Gettier
- Ernst von Glasersfeld
- Alvin Goldman
- Nelson Goodman
- Paul Grice
- Susan Haack
- Sandra Harding
- Gilbert Harman
- Sally Haslanger
- John Hawthorne
- Friedrich A. Hayek
- Carl Hempel
- Carrie Ichikawa Jenkins
- Peter D. Klein
- Hilary Kornblith
- Thomas Kuhn
- Jennifer Lackey
- Keith Lehrer
- Isaac Levi
- David Deutsch
- David Lewis
- Peter Lipton
- John McDowell
- G.E. Moore
- Robert Nozick
- George Pappas
- Jean Piaget
- Alvin Plantinga
- Karl Popper
- Duncan Pritchard
- Hilary Putnam
- W.V.O. Quine
- Ayn Rand
- Sherrilyn Roush
- Bertrand Russell
- Susanna Schellenberg
- John Searle
- Susanna Siegel
- Ernest Sosa
- Richard Clyde Taylor
- Walter Terence Stace
- Colin Murray Turbayne
- P. F. Strawson
- Barry Stroud
- Nassim Nicholas Taleb
- Peter Unger
- Gerhard Vollmer
- Jules Vuillemin
- Phillip H. Wiebe
- Jessica Wilson
- Karla Jessen Williamson
- Ludwig Wittgenstein
- Linda Trinkaus Zagzebski
- Richard Feldman
