= List of metaphysicians =

This is a list of metaphysicians, philosophers who specialize in metaphysics. See also Lists of philosophers.

== Metaphysicians born BC ==
- Veda Vyasa
- Kapila
- Pythagoras
- Thales
- Anaximander
- Anaximenes
- Xenophanes
- Heraclitus
- Parmenides
- Zeno of Elea
- Melissus of Samos
- Leucippus
- Democritus
- Anaxagoras
- Empedocles
- Alcmaeon of Croton
- Hippasus
- Diogenes of Apollonia
- Kaṇāda
- Plato
- Eudoxus of Cnidus
- Speusippus
- Xenocrates
- Aristotle

== Metaphysicians born between 1 and 600 AD ==
- Numenius
- Alexander of Aphrodisias
- Ammonius Saccas
- Origen of Alexandria
- Origen the Pagan
- Plotinus
- Porphyry
- Iamblichus
- Syrianus
- Proclus
- Ammonius Hermiae
- Pseudo-Dionysius the Areopagite
- Olympiodorus the Younger
- Damascius
- Simplicius of Cilicia
- John Philoponus

== Metaphysicians born between 600 and 1400 ==
- Adi Shankaracharya
- John Scotus Eriugena
- Vāchaspati Misra
- Anselm of Canterbury
- Peter Abelard
- Bernard of Chartres
- Ramanujacharya
- Gilbert de la Porrée
- Thierry of Chartres
- Hugh of Saint Victor
- Richard of Saint Victor
- Maimonides
- Philip the Chancellor
- William of Auvergne
- Alexander of Hales
- Albertus Magnus
- Bonaventure
- Roger Bacon
- John Peckham
- Thomas Aquinas
- Madhwacharya
- Giles of Rome
- Godfrey of Fontaines
- Henry of Ghent
- Petrus Aureoli
- Duns Scotus
- Walter Burley
- Hervaeus Natalis
- William of Ockham
- Vidyaranya
- Jean Buridan
- Jean Capréolus
- Meister Eckhart
- Dominic of Flanders
- Jayatirtha

== Metaphysicians born between 1400 and 1700 ==
- Paolo Barbò da Soncino
- Marsilio Ficino
- Vyasatirtha
- Mir Fendereski
- Thomas Cajetan
- Francisco Suárez
- Domingo Báñez
- Robert Bellarmine
- John of St. Thomas
- René Descartes
- Thomas Hobbes
- Anne Conway
- Baruch Spinoza
- Nicolas Malebranche
- Gottfried Leibniz
- George Berkeley
- Christian Wolff
- Jakob Böhme

== Metaphysicians born between 1700 and 1800 ==
- Immanuel Kant
- Georg W. F. Hegel
- Arthur Schopenhauer
- Friedrich W. J. Schelling
- Johann G. Fichte
- Friedrich H. Jacobi

== Metaphysicians born between 1800 and 1900 ==
- Nikolai Berdyaev
- Henri Bergson
- Franz Brentano
- Joseph Kleutgen
- Semyon Frank
- Gottlob Frege
- Réginald Garrigou-Lagrange
- Étienne Gilson
- Nicolai Hartmann
- Martin Heidegger
- George Holmes Howison
- Jacques Maritain
- John McTaggart
- Alexius Meinong
- G. E. Moore
- Ella Norraikow
- Bertrand Russell
- Vladimir Solovyov
- Edith Stein
- Pierre Teilhard de Chardin
- Alfred North Whitehead
- Donald Cary Williams
- Ludwig Wittgenstein

== Metaphysicians born after 1900 ==
- William Lane Craig
- Marilyn McCord Adams
- Robert Merrihew Adams
- William Alston
- G. E. M. Anscombe
- David Malet Armstrong
- Alain Badiou
- Lynne Rudder Baker
- Hans Urs von Balthasar
- Paul Benacerraf
- Charles Dunbar Broad
- Berit Brogaard
- David Burrell
- Ross Cameron
- David Chalmers
- Roderick Chisholm
- Brian Davies (philosopher)
- Gilles Deleuze
- Arda Denkel
- Michael Devitt
- Alexander Dugin
- Catherine Elgin
- Edward Feser
- Cornelio Fabro
- Kit Fine
- Peter Geach
- Peter Glassen
- Nelson Goodman
- Jean Grondin
- Rene Guenon
- Pierre Hadot
- Graham Harman
- John Hawthorne
- Stephen Hetherington
- Shadworth Hodgson
- Charles H. Kahn
- Anthony Kenny
- Jaegwon Kim
- David Kolb
- Norman Kretzmann
- Saul Kripke
- Brian Leftow
- David Kellogg Lewis
- Bernard Lonergan
- Peter Ludlow
- William Lycan
- Penelope Maddy
- Ralph McInerny
- Quentin Meillassoux
- Trenton Merricks
- Iris Murdoch
- Joseph Owens (Redemptorist)
- Terence Parsons
- Alvin Plantinga
- Graham Priest
- Hilary Putnam
- Willard van Orman Quine
- Karl Rahner
- Jay Rosenberg
- Nathan Salmon
- Jean-Paul Sartre
- Theodore Sider
- Gilbert Simondon
- Barry Smith
- Wolfgang Smith
- Robert Stalnaker
- Peter F. Strawson
- Eleonore Stump
- Richard Clyde Taylor
- Judith Jarvis Thomson
- Colin Murray Turbayne
- Peter Unger
- Peter van Inwagen
- David Wiggins
- Stuart Wilde
- Colin Wilson
- Jessica Wilson
- John Wippel
- Dean Zimmerman
- Xavier Zubiri
