= Joseph Levine =

Joseph Levine may refer to:

- Joseph E. Levine (1905–1987), American film producer
- Joseph Levine (philosopher) (born 1952), American philosopher
