= List of existentialists =

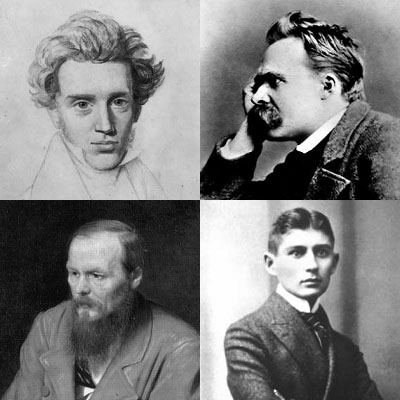
Many of the founding figures of existentialism represent its diverse background (clockwise from top left): Dane Søren Kierkegaard was a theologian, German Friedrich Nietzsche an anti-establishment wandering academic, Czech Franz Kafka a short-story writer and insurance assessor, and Russian Fyodor Dostoyevsky a novelist

Existentialism is a movement within continental philosophy that developed in the late 19th and 20th centuries. As a loose philosophical school, some persons associated with existentialism explicitly rejected the label (e.g. Martin Heidegger), and others are not remembered primarily as philosophers, but as writers (Fyodor Dostoyevsky) or theologians (Paul Tillich). It is related to several movements within continental philosophy including phenomenology, nihilism, absurdism, and post-modernism.

Name	Lived	Nationality	Occupation	Notes
Nicola Abbagnano	July 15, 1901 – September 9, 1990	Italy	Philosopher	Also associated with neopositivism
Gonzalo Arango	January 18, 1931 – September 25, 1976	Colombia	Philosopher	Founded Nadaism
Hannah Arendt	October 14, 1906 – December 4, 1975	Germany	Philosopher	Also associated with phenomenology, associate of Heidegger
Abdel Rahman Badawi	February 17, 1917 – July 25, 2002	Egypt	Philosopher	
Hazel Barnes	December 16, 1915 – March 18, 2008	United States	Philosopher, author	Translated Sartre into English
Karl Barth	May 10, 1886 – December 10, 1968	Switzerland	Theologian	Founder of neo-orthodoxy
Nikolai Berdyaev	March 18, 1874 – March 25, 1948	Russia	Theologian, philosopher	Christian existentialist
Steve Biko	December 18, 1946 – September 12, 1977	South Africa	Activist	
Martin Buber	February 8, 1878 – June 13, 1965	Germany	Theologian	Worked with Rosenzweig
Rudolf Bultmann	August 20, 1884 – July 30, 1976	Germany	Theologian	
Dino Buzzati	October 16, 1906 – January 28, 1972	Italy	Author	Also associated with magical realism
Albert Camus	November 27, 1913 – January 4, 1960	France	Philosopher, author	Founded Les Temps modernes with de Beauvoir and Sartre; developer of the Absurdism
Jane Welsh Carlyle	July 14, 1801 – April 21, 1866	United Kingdom	Essayist	Wife of Thomas Carlyle
Thomas Carlyle	December 4, 1795 – February 5, 1881	United Kingdom	Author, historian	Husband of Jane Welsh Carlyle
Emil Cioran	April 8, 1911 – June 20, 1995	Romania	Philosopher, essayist	Also associated with pessimism
Simone de Beauvoir	January 9, 1908 – April 14, 1986	France	Philosopher, anthropologist	Founded Les Temps modernes with Camus and Sartre; predecessor of second-wave feminism
Walter A. Davis	November 9, 1942 –	United States	Philosopher, playwright, cultural critic	Author of Inwardness and Existence: Subjectivity in/and Hegel, Heidegger, Marx and Freud
Fyodor Dostoyevsky	November 11, 1821 – February 9, 1881	Russia	Novelist	Foundational figure of existentialism
William A. Earle	1919 – October 16, 1988	United States	Philosopher	Also associated with Phenomenology, co-founded the Society for Phenomenology and Existential Philosophy with Wild and James M. Edie
Ralph Ellison	May 1, 1913 – April 16, 1994	United States	Novelist	Wrote Invisible Man, associate of Wright
Frantz Fanon	July 20, 1925 – December 6, 1961	France (Martinique), Algeria	Philosopher, anthropologist, psychiatrist	Also associated with Marxism
Vilém Flusser	May 12, 1920 – November 17, 1991	Czechoslovakia	Philosopher	Also associated with phenomenology
Benjamin Fondane	November 14, 1898 – October 2 or 3, 1944	Romania	Author, poet, film director	
James Anthony Froude	April 23, 1818 – October 20, 1894	United Kingdom	Historian	
Alberto Giacometti	October 10, 1901 – January 11, 1966	Switzerland	Artist	Known for his artistic style and the existential crisis within
Juozas Girnius	1915–1994	Lithuania	Philosopher	Christian existentialist
Fernando González	April 24, 1895 – February 16, 1964	Colombia	Philosopher, Lawyer	Works inspired Nadaism
Lewis Gordon	1962–	United States	Philosopher	Also associated with Africana philosophy, Black existentialism, and phenomenology
Martin Heidegger	September 26, 1889 – May 26, 1976	Germany	Philosopher	Also associated with phenomenology and hermeneutics, associate of Arendt, rejected the label of "existentialist"
Edmund Husserl	April 8, 1859 – April 26, 1938	Austria, Germany	Philosopher	Founder of Phenomenology
Nae Ionescu	June 16, 1890 – March 15, 1940	Romania	Philosopher, mathematician	
Eugène Ionesco	November 26, 1909 – March 28, 1994	Romania	Playwright, essayist	Foundational figure of absurdism
William James	January 11, 1842 – August 26, 1910	United States	Philosopher, psychologist	Foundational figure of pragmatism
Karl Jaspers	February 23, 1883 – February 26, 1969	Germany	Philosopher	Also associated with neo-Kantianism
Franz Kafka	July 3, 1883 – June 3, 1924	Austria-Hungary (Bohemian)	Novelist	Foundational figure of existentialism
Walter Kaufmann	July 1, 1921 – September 4, 1980	United States	Philosopher	Translated Hegel, Goethe, Buber and Nietzsche's works into English
Søren Kierkegaard	May 5, 1813 – November 11, 1855	Denmark	Theologian, philosopher, author	Foundational figure of existentialism, Christian existentialist
Ladislav Klíma	August 8, 1878 – April 19, 1928	Czechoslovakia	Philosopher, novelist	Also associated with subjective idealism
Emmanuel Levinas	January 12, 1906 – December 25, 1995	Lithuania, France	Philosopher, theologian	Studied with Heidegger and Husserl
John Macquarrie	June 27, 1919 – May 28, 2007	United Kingdom	Theologian	Christian existentialist
Vytautas Mačernis	June 5, 1921 – October 7, 1944	Lithuania	Poet	
Naguib Mahfouz	December 11, 1911 – August 30, 2006	Egypt	Novelist	
Gabriel Marcel	December 7, 1889 – October 8, 1973	France	Theologian, philosopher	Christian existentialist
Maurice Merleau-Ponty	March 14, 1908 – May 3, 1961	France	Philosopher	Also associated with phenomenology, associate of de Beauvoir and Sartre
Friedrich Nietzsche	October 15, 1844 – August 25, 1900	Germany	Philosopher	Foundational figure of existentialism, also associated with (opposition to) nihilism
José Ortega y Gasset	May 9, 1883 – October 18, 1955	Spain	Philosopher	Also associated with perspectivism, pragmatism, vitalism, and historicism
Viktor Petrov	1894–1969	Ukraine	Novelist, anthropologist	
Franz Rosenzweig	December 26, 1887 – December 10, 1929	Germany	Theologian, philosopher	Worked with Buber
Jean-Paul Sartre	June 21, 1905 – April 15, 1980	France	Philosopher, novelist, activist	Also associated with Marxism, co-founded Les Temps modernes with de Beauvoir and Camus
Aous Shakra	April 22, 1908 – April 1, 1992	Palestine	Politician, philosopher	
Lev Shestov	January 31, 1866 – November 19, 1938	Russia, France	Philosopher	Also associated with Irrationalism
Joseph B. Soloveitchik	February 27, 1903 – April 9, 1993	United States	Rabbi	
Paul Tillich	August 20, 1886 – October 22, 1965	United States, Germany	Theologian, philosopher	Christian existentialist
Rick Turner	1942–1978	South Africa	Philosopher	Also associated with Marxism, studied with Sartre
Miguel de Unamuno	September 29, 1864 – December 31, 1936	Spain	Novelist, essayist, dramatist, philosopher	
John Daniel Wild	April 10, 1902 – October 23, 1972	United States	Philosopher	Originally associated with empiricism, realism, and pragmatism; later associated with phenomenology; co-founded the Society for Phenomenology and Existential Philosophy with Earle and James M. Edie
Colin Wilson	June 26, 1931 – December 5, 2013	United Kingdom	Author	Wrote The Outsider
Richard Wright	September 4, 1908 – November 28, 1960	United States	Author	Pioneer of Black existentialism and chronicler of the black experience in the American South. Onetime mentor of James Baldwin; strongly influenced Fanon and other Négritude writers, close friends with Sartre and De Beauvoir. Had significant impact on European and African literary existentialism
Peter Wessel Zapffe	December 18, 1899 – October 12, 1990	Norway	Philosopher	Founded biosophy
Muhammad Iqbal	November 9, 1877 – 21 April 1938	Pakistan	Philosopher, writer, poet, politician	National Poet of Pakistan

== Pre-existentialist philosophers ==
Several thinkers who lived prior to the rise of existentialism have been retroactively considered proto-existentialists for their approach to philosophy and lifestyle.

Name	Lived	Nationality	Occupation	Notes
Augustine of Hippo	November 13, 354 – August 28, 430	Algeria	Theologian	At various times associated with neoplatonism, Doctor of the Church
Giacomo Leopardi	June 29, 1798 – June 14, 1837	Italy	Poet, writer and philosopher	Romanticism, classicism and pessimism
Mulla Sadra	1571–1636	Persia	Philosopher	Islamic philosopher associated with illuminationism and transcendent theosophy
Blaise Pascal	June 19, 1623 – August 19, 1662	France	Mathematician, physicist, philosopher, theologian	
Jean-Jacques Rousseau	June 28, 1712 – July 2, 1778	Switzerland	Philosopher	Foundational figure of social contract theory, French Revolution, socialism
Socrates	469–399 BC	Greece	Philosopher	Founder of Western philosophy
Stoics	fl. 3rd century BC – AD 529	Greece	–	Philosophical school influenced by Socrates through Plato
Henry David Thoreau	July 12, 1817 – May 6, 1862	United States	Author, poet	Foundational figure of transcendentalism
Arthur Schopenhauer	February 22, 1788 – September 21,1860	Germany	Philosopher	Post-Kantian philosophy, German idealism
Max Stirner	October 25, 1806 – June 26,1856	Germany	Philosopher	Egoist anarchism, Young Hegelians
