= Index of sociopolitical thinkers =

The following is an index of sociopolitical thinkers listed by the first name.

== Alphabetical list ==
- Abraham Joshua Heschel
- Abul Kalam Azad
- Adam Müller
- Alain de Benoist
- Alexander of Aphrodisias
- Aleksandr Solzhenitsyn
- Alexis de Tocqueville
- Alfred Rosenberg
- Al-Ghazali
- Ali Shariati
- Antonio Negri
- Aristotle
- Armin Mohler
- Arthur Moeller van den Bruck
- Auguste Comte
- Averroes
- Axel Honneth
- Ayn Rand
- Benjamin Tucker
- Bertrand de Jouvenel
- Bertrand Russell
- B. R. Ambedkar
- Carl Joachim Friedrich
- Carl Schmitt
- Chanakya
- Charles Taylor
- C. Wright Mills
- Cheng Yi
- Cicero
- Claude Lefort
- Claude Lévi-Strauss
- Confucius
- Cornel West
- Cornelius Castoriadis
- Daniel Guérin
- David D. Friedman
- David Hume
- Democritus
- Dong Zhongshu
- Edmund Burke
- Edward Burnett Tylor
- Edward Said
- Émile Durkheim
- Emma Goldman
- Eric Voegelin
- Erik von Kuehnelt-Leddihn
- Ernst Bloch
- Ernst Jünger
- Étienne de La Boétie
- Eugen Rosenstock-Huessy
- Félix Guattari
- Felix Kaufmann
- Ferdinand de Saussure
- Francis Bacon
- Francis Fukuyama
- Francis Parker Yockey
- Franz Boas
- Frédéric Bastiat
- Friedrich Engels
- Friedrich Hayek
- Friedrich Nietzsche
- Friedrich Schleiermacher
- Gaetano Mosca
- Georg Jellinek
- Georg Wilhelm Friedrich Hegel
- George Ohsawa
- George Santayana
- Georges Bataille
- Gerald Cohen
- Gerrard Winstanley
- Giambattista Vico
- Giannina Braschi
- Giorgio Agamben
- Giovanni Gentile
- G.K. Chesterton
- Gottfried Leibniz
- Gustave de Molinari
- Guy Debord
- H. L. A. Hart
- Han Fei
- Hannah Arendt
- Hans-Hermann Hoppe
- Hans Kelsen
- Har Dayal
- Harriet Martineau
- Harriet Taylor Mill
- Harvey Mansfield
- Hayashi Razan
- Hendrik Verwoerd
- Henri Lefebvre
- Henry David Thoreau
- Henry George
- Henry Home, Lord Kames
- Henry Sidgwick
- Henry St John, 1st Viscount Bolingbroke
- Herbert Spencer
- Hippolyte Taine
- Hirata Atsutane
- Houston Stewart Chamberlain
- Howard Zinn
- Hugo Grotius
- Immanuel Kant
- Iris Marion Young
- Isabel Paterson
- Isaiah Berlin
- Israr Ahmed
- J. J. C. Smart
- Jacques Lacan
- Jacques Rancière
- James Burnham
- Janet Coleman
- Jawaharlal Nehru
- Jean Bodin
- Jean-François Lyotard
- Jean-Jacques Rousseau
- Jeremy Bentham
- Johann Gottfried Herder
- Johann Gottlieb Fichte
- John Austin
- John Finnis
- John Hospers
- John Locke
- John Rawls
- John Searle
- John Stuart Mill
- John Zerzan
- José Ortega y Gasset
- Joseph de Maistre
- Joseph Priestley
- Joseph Raz
- Joxe Azurmendi
- Juan Donoso Cortés
- Judith Butler
- Julien Offray de La Mettrie
- Julius Evola
- Jürgen Habermas
- Kaibara Ekken
- Karl Marx
- Karl Popper
- Karl-Otto Apel
- Leo Strauss
- Leo Tolstoy
- Leonard Read
- Lewis H. Morgan
- Lon L. Fuller
- Louis Althusser
- Louis de Bonald
- Lu Xun
- Ludwig von Mises
- Lysander Spooner
- Manuel De Landa
- Mao Zedong
- Margaret Mead
- Marianne Weber
- Mario Bunge
- Mario Tronti
- Martha Nussbaum
- Martin Luther King Jr.
- Max Horkheimer
- Max Stirner
- Max Weber
- Mazdak
- Mencius
- Michael Novak
- Michael Oakeshott
- Michel Foucault
- Michel Onfray
- Mihailo Marković
- Mikhail Bakunin
- Milton Friedman
- Mohandas Karamchand Gandhi
- Monarchomachs
- Montesquieu
- Mortimer Adler
- Mozi
- Muhammad Asad
- Muhammad Iqbal
- Murray Bookchin
- Murray Rothbard
- Nancy Cartwright
- Nestor Makhno
- Niccolò Machiavelli
- Nicolás Gómez Dávila
- Nigel Warburton
- Noam Chomsky
- Octave Mirbeau
- Ogyū Sorai
- Oliver Wendell Holmes Jr.
- Oskar Negt
- Oswald Spengler
- Pierre-Joseph Proudhon
- Paul Virilio
- Pekka Himanen
- Peter Kropotkin
- Peter Lamborn Wilson
- Peter Sloterdijk
- Philip Pettit
- Philippe Van Parijs
- Pierre Bourdieu
- Pierre-André Taguieff
- Plato
- Polybius
- Prabhat Ranjan Sarkar
- Ralf Dahrendorf
- Raúl Prebisch
- Raya Dunayevskaya
- Raymond Aron
- René Girard
- René Guénon
- Richard M. Weaver
- Right Hegelians
- Robert Filmer
- Robert K. Merton
- Roberto Esposito
- Robert Nozick
- Robert P. George
- Roberto Mangabeira Unger
- Roger Scruton
- Ronald Dworkin
- Rosa Luxemburg
- Russell Kirk
- Ruth Benedict
- Samuel Edward Konkin III
- Samuel Taylor Coleridge
- Sayyid Qutb
- Serge Moscovici
- Simone de Beauvoir
- Simone Weil
- Slavoj Žižek
- Sun Tzu
- Sun Yat-sen
- Takis Fotopoulos
- Talcott Parsons
- Tan Sitong
- Theodor W. Adorno
- Thiruvalluvar
- Thomas Aquinas
- Thomas Carlyle
- Thomas Hill Green
- Thomas Hobbes
- Thomas Nagel
- Thomas Sowell
- Thucydides
- Umar ibn Al-Khattab
- Vilfredo Pareto
- Voltaire
- Voltairine de Cleyre
- Vladimir Lenin
- Walter Benjamin
- Wesley Newcomb Hohfeld
- Wilhelm Dilthey
- William James
- William Lloyd Garrison
- William Paley
- Xun Zi
- Yamaga Sokō
- Yamazaki Ansai
- Yi I
- Young Hegelians
- Zhuangzi

== Lists of other social and political philosophers ==
- List of Confucianists
- List of critical theorists
- List of Existentialists
- List of political philosophers
