= Mind =

Totality of psychological phenomena

The mind is responsible for phenomena like perception, thought, feeling, and action.

The mind is that which thinks, feels, perceives, imagines, remembers, and wills. It covers the totality of mental phenomena, including both conscious processes, through which an individual is aware of external and internal circumstances, and unconscious processes, which can influence an individual without intention or awareness. The mind plays a central role in most aspects of human life, but its exact nature is disputed. Some characterizations focus on internal aspects, saying that the mind transforms information and is not directly accessible to outside observers. Others stress its relation to outward conduct, understanding mental phenomena as dispositions to engage in observable behavior.

The mind–body problem is the challenge of explaining the relation between matter and mind. Traditionally, mind and matter were often thought of as distinct substances that could exist independently from one another. The dominant philosophical position since the 20th century has been physicalism, which holds that everything is material, meaning that minds are certain aspects or features of some material objects. The evolutionary history of the mind is tied to the development of nervous systems, which led to the formation of brains. As brains became more complex, the number and capacity of mental functions increased with particular brain areas dedicated to specific mental functions. Individual human minds also develop over time as they learn from experience and pass through psychological stages in the process of aging. Some people are affected by mental disorders, in which certain mental capacities do not function as they should.

It is widely accepted that at least some non-human animals have some form of mind, but it is controversial as to which animals this applies. The topic of artificial minds poses similar challenges and theorists discuss the possibility and consequences of creating them using computers.

The main fields of inquiry studying the mind include psychology, neuroscience, cognitive science, and philosophy of mind. They tend to focus on different aspects of the mind and employ different methods of investigation, ranging from empirical observation and neuroimaging to conceptual analysis and thought experiments. The mind is relevant to many other fields, including epistemology, anthropology, religion, and education.

== Definition ==
The mind is the totality of psychological phenomena and capacities, encompassing both conscious and unconscious states. The term mind is sometimes used in a narrow meaning to refer only to cognitive functions associated with perception, reasoning, awareness, and memory. In a broader sense, it also includes processes like feeling, motivation, and behavior. The precise definition of mind is disputed. While it is generally accepted that some non-human animals also have minds, there is no agreement on where exactly the boundary lies. Despite these disputes, there is wide agreement that the mind plays a central role in most aspects of human life as the seat of consciousness, emotions, thoughts, and sense of personal identity. Various fields of inquiry study the mind; the main ones include psychology, cognitive science, neuroscience, and philosophy of mind.

The words psyche and mentality are usually used as synonyms of mind. They are often employed in overlapping ways with the terms soul, spirit, cognition, intellect, intelligence, and brain, but their meanings are not exactly the same. Some religions understand the soul as an independent entity that constitutes the immaterial essence of human beings, is of divine origin, survives bodily death, and is immortal. The word spirit has various additional meanings not directly associated with mind, such as a vital principle animating living beings or a supernatural being inhabiting objects or places. Cognition encompasses certain types of mental processes in which knowledge is acquired and information is processed. The intellect is one mental capacity responsible for thought, reasoning, and understanding and is closely related to intelligence as the ability to acquire, understand, and apply knowledge. The brain is the physical organ responsible for most or all mental functions.

The modern English word mind originally comes from the Old English word gemynd, meaning 'memory'. This term gave rise to the Middle English words mind(e), münd(e), and mend(e), resulting in a slow expansion of meaning to cover all mental capacities. The original meaning is preserved in expressions like call to mind and keep in mind. Cognates include the Old High German gimunt, the Gothic gamunds, the ancient Greek μένος, the Latin mens, and the Sanskrit manas. (Note: Not all languages have a word that directly corresponds to the English word mind. For example, German uses the word Geist, which can mean both 'mind' and 'spirit'.)

== Forms ==
The mind encompasses many phenomena, including perception, memory, thought, imagination, motivation, emotion, attention, learning, and consciousness. Perception is the process of interpreting and organizing sensory information to become acquainted with the environment. This information is acquired through sense organs receptive to various types of physical stimuli, which correspond to different forms of perception, such as vision, hearing, touch, smell, and taste. The sensory information received serves as raw data that is filtered and processed to actively constitute the experience of the world and the objects within it. This complex process underlying perceptual experience is shaped by many factors, including the individual's past experiences, cultural background, beliefs, knowledge, and expectations.

Memory is the mechanism of storing and retrieving information. Episodic memory handles information about specific past events in one's life and makes this information available in the present. When a person remembers what they had for dinner yesterday, they employ episodic memory. Semantic memory handles general knowledge about the world that is not tied to any specific episodes. When a person recalls that the capital of Japan is Tokyo, they usually employ semantic memory to access this general information without remembering the specific instance when they learned it. Procedural memory is memory of how to do things, such as riding a bicycle or playing a musical instrument. Another distinction is between short-term memory, which holds information for brief periods, usually with the purpose of completing specific cognitive tasks, and long-term memory, which can store information for extended periods, potentially lasting a lifetime.

Thinking involves the processing of information and the manipulation of concepts and ideas. It is goal-oriented and often happens in response to experiences by aiming at making sense of them, organizing their information, and deciding how to respond. Logical reasoning is a form of thinking that starts from a set of premises and aims to arrive at a conclusion supported by these premises. This is the case when deducing that "Socrates is mortal" from the premises "Socrates is a man" and "all men are mortal". Problem-solving is a closely related process that consists of several steps, such as identifying a problem, developing a plan to address it, implementing the plan, and assessing whether it worked. Thinking in the form of decision-making involves considering possible courses of action to assess which one is the most beneficial. As a symbolic process, thinking is deeply intertwined with language, and some theorists hold that all thought happens through the medium of language.

Imagination is a creative process of internally generating mental images, ideas, experiences, and related phenomena. Unlike perception, it does not directly depend on the stimulation of sensory organs. Similar to dreaming, these mental constructs are often derived from previous experiences but can include novel combinations and elements. Imagination happens during daydreaming and plays a key role in art and literature. Additionally, it can also be used to come up with novel solutions to real-world problems.

Motivation is an internal state that propels individuals to initiate, continue, or terminate goal-directed behavior. It is responsible for the formation of intentions to perform actions and affects what goals someone pursues, how much effort they invest in the activity, and how long they engage in it. Motivation is affected by emotions, which are temporary experiences of positive or negative feelings like joy or anger. They are directed at and evaluate specific events, persons, or situations. They usually come together with certain physiological and behavioral responses.

Attention is an aspect of other mental processes in which mental resources like awareness are directed towards certain features of experience and away from others. This happens when a driver focuses on traffic while ignoring billboards on the side of the road. Attention can be controlled voluntarily in the pursuit of specific goals but can also be diverted involuntarily when a strong stimulus captures a person's attention. Attention is relevant to learning, which is the ability of the mind to acquire new information and permanently modify its understanding and behavioral patterns. Individuals learn by undergoing experiences, which helps them adapt to the environment.

=== Conscious and unconscious ===
An influential distinction is between conscious and unconscious mental processes. Consciousness is the awareness of external and internal circumstances. It encompasses a wide variety of states, such as perception, thinking, fantasizing, dreaming, and altered states of consciousness. In the case of phenomenal consciousness, the awareness involves a direct and qualitative experience of mental phenomena, like the auditory experience of attending a concert. Access consciousness, by contrast, refers to an awareness of information that is accessible to other mental processes but not necessarily part of current experience. For example, the information stored in a memory may be accessible when drawing conclusions or guiding actions even when the person is not explicitly thinking about it.

Unconscious or nonconscious mental processes operate without the individual's awareness but can still influence mental phenomena on the level of thought, feeling, and action. Some theorists distinguish between preconscious, subconscious, and unconscious states depending on their accessibility to conscious awareness. (Note: The precise differences between these concepts are disputed. In Freud's psychoanalysis, the preconscious mind lies outside current awareness but can easily be accessed, whereas the unconscious mind is further removed from deliberate access. The word subconscious is sometimes used as a synonym of preconscious.) When applied to the overall state of a person rather than specific processes, the term unconscious implies that the person lacks any awareness of their environment and themselves, like during a coma. The unconscious mind plays a central role in psychoanalysis as the part of the mind that contains thoughts, memories, and desires not accessible to conscious introspection. According to Sigmund Freud, the psychological mechanism of repression keeps disturbing phenomena, like unacceptable sexual and aggressive impulses, from entering consciousness to protect the individual. Psychoanalytic theory studies symptoms caused by this process and therapeutic methods to avoid them by making the repressed thoughts accessible to conscious awareness.

=== Other distinctions ===
Mental states are often divided into qualitative and propositional states. Qualitative states are experiences of sensory qualities, typically referred to as qualia, like colors, sounds, smells, pains, itches, and hunger. Propositional states involve an attitude towards a content that can be expressed by a declarative sentence. When a person believes that it is raining, they have the propositional attitude of belief towards the content "it is raining". Different types of propositional states are characterized by different attitudes towards their content. For instance, it is also possible to hope, fear, desire, or doubt that it is raining. (Note: Some mental states, like perceptions and emotions, may have both qualitative and propositional aspects.)

A mental state or process is rational if it is based on good reasons or follows the norms of rationality. For example, a belief is rational if it relies on strong supporting evidence and a decision is rational if it follows careful deliberation of all the relevant factors and outcomes. Mental states are irrational if they fail to adhere to these standards, such as beliefs caused by faulty reasoning, superstition, or cognitive biases, and decisions that give into temptations against one's best judgment. Mental states that fall outside the domain of rational evaluation are arational rather than irrational. There is controversy regarding which mental phenomena lie outside this domain; suggested examples include sensory impressions, feelings, desires, and involuntary responses.

Another contrast is between dispositional and occurrent mental states. A dispositional state is a power that is not exercised. If a person believes that cats have whiskers but does not think about this fact, it is a dispositional belief. By activating the belief to consciously think about it or use it in other cognitive processes, it becomes occurrent until it is no longer actively considered or used. The great majority of a person's beliefs are dispositional most of the time.

=== Faculties and modules ===
Traditionally, the mind was subdivided into mental faculties understood as capacities to perform certain functions or bring about certain processes. An influential subdivision in the history of philosophy was between the faculties of intellect and will. The intellect encompasses mental phenomena aimed at understanding the world and determining what to believe or what is true; the will is concerned with practical matters and what is good, reflected in phenomena like desire, decision-making, and action. The exact number and nature of the mental faculties are disputed. More fine-grained distinctions divide the intellect into the faculties of understanding and judgment or add sensibility as an additional faculty responsible for sensory impressions. (Note: Mental faculties also play a central role in the Indian tradition, such as the contrast between the sense mind (manas) and intellect (buddhi).)

In the Müller-Lyer illusion, the horizontal black lines have the same length but the top line appears longer. The illusion persists even after becoming aware of it because of the automatic functioning of mental modules responsible for low-level visual processing.

In contrast to the traditional view, more recent approaches analyze the mind in terms of mental modules rather than faculties. A mental module is an inborn system of the brain that automatically performs a particular function within a specific domain without conscious awareness or effort. In contrast to faculties, the concept of mental modules is normally used to provide a more limited explanation. It is typically restricted to certain low-level cognitive processes without trying to explain how they are integrated into higher-level processes such as conscious reasoning. (Note: A different perspective is proposed by the massive modularity hypothesis, which states that the mind is entirely composed of modules with high-level modules establishing the connection between low-level modules.) Many low-level cognitive processes responsible for visual perception have this automatic and unconscious nature. In the case of visual illusions like the Müller-Lyer illusion, the underlying processes continue their operation and the illusion persists even after a person has become aware of the illusion, indicating the mechanical and involuntary nature of the process. Other examples of mental modules concern cognitive processes responsible for language processing and facial recognition.

== Theories of the nature of mind ==
Theories of the nature of mind aim to determine what all mental states have in common. They seek to discover the "mark of the mental", that is, the criteria that distinguish mental from non-mental phenomena. Epistemic criteria say that the unique feature of mental states is how people know about them. For example, if a person has a toothache, they have direct or non-inferential knowledge that they are in pain. But they do not have this kind of knowledge about non-mental phenomena such as the physical causes of the pain, and may have to consult external evidence through visual inspection or a visit to the dentist. Another feature commonly ascribed to mental states is that they are private, meaning that others do not have direct access to a person's mental state. As a result, external observers have to make inferences from other indicators, like the pain behavior of the person with the toothache. Some philosophers claim that knowledge of some or all mental states is infallible, for instance, that a person cannot be mistaken about whether they are in pain.

A related view asserts that all mental states are either conscious or accessible to consciousness. According to this view, when a person actively remembers the fact that the Eiffel Tower is in Paris then this state is mental because it is part of consciousness. When the person does not think about it, this belief is still considered a mental state because the person could bring it to consciousness by thinking about it. This view denies the existence of a "deep unconsciousness", that is, unconscious mental states that cannot in principle become conscious.

Another theory says that intentionality (Note: Intentionality is to be distinguished from intention in the sense of having a plan to perform a certain action.) is the mark of the mental. A state is intentional if it refers to or represents something. For example, if a person perceives a piano or thinks about it then the mental state is intentional because it refers to a piano. This view distinguishes between the original intentionality of mental phenomena and the derivative intentionality of some non-mental phenomena. According to this view, the ability of words and pictures to refer to things derives from the fact that they can evoke mental states. In this sense, only mental states have original intentionality, whereas words and pictures have derivative intentionality since they would not refer if divorced from linguistic conventions or visual interpretations. Some philosophers disagree that all mental states are intentional, citing itches, tickles, and pains as possible exceptions.

According to behaviorism, mental states are dispositions to engage in certain publicly observable behavior as a reaction to particular external stimuli. This view implies that mental phenomena are not private internal states but are accessible to empirical observation like regular physical phenomena. Functionalism agrees that mental states do not depend on the exact internal constitution of the mind and characterizes them instead in regard to their functional role. The functional role of a mental state is the way it interacts with other phenomena. For example, pain is often caused by bodily injury and typically leads to pain behavior, like moaning, and a desire to stop the pain. As a result, injury, pain behavior, and desire are part of the functional role of pain. Computationalism, a similar theory prominent in cognitive science, defines minds in terms of cognitions and computations as information processors.

Theories under the umbrella of externalism emphasize the mind's dependency on the environment. According to this view, mental states and their contents are at least partially determined by external circumstances. For example, some forms of content externalism hold that it can depend on external circumstances whether a belief refers to one object or another. The position of embedded cognition emphasizes that mental processes happen in the context of a physical and social environments. It examines how this context shapes cognitive activity. The extended mind thesis states that external circumstances not only influence the mind but are part of it. In this sense, a diary is part of the mind by helping it store information. Similarly, an electronic calculator is part of the mind by helping it perform calculations. The closely related view of enactivism holds that mental processes involve an interaction between organism and environment. A theory from the field of embodied cognition states that the connection to a body is an essential feature of minds. It asserts that certain aspects of the body outside the nervous system, like motor capacities, are part of the mind. (Note: More generally, embodied cognition is the study of the effects of bodily phenomena on the mind. It examines, for example, how certain bodily movements improve or hinder cognitive performance and how motor capacities affect the development of cognitive abilities.)

== Relation to matter ==
=== Mind–body problem ===
The mind–body problem is the difficulty of providing a general explanation of the relationship between mind and body, for example, of the link between thoughts and brain processes. Despite their different characteristics, mind and body interact with each other, like when a bodily change causes mental discomfort or when a limb moves because of an intention. The mind–body problem came to particular prominence in modern philosophy as a result of Descartes' metaphysical distinction between mind and body. Earlier philosophers typically did not see mind and body as contrasting principles. (Note: According to Aristotle's hylomorphism, for example, they are complementary principles: the soul is the form of the body while the body is the matter of the soul.) Following Descartes' philosophy, minds were often conceived as substantial entities able to exist on their own. Now they are more commonly seen as capacities rather than independent entities.

Different approaches toward resolving the mind–body problem

According to substance dualism, minds or souls exist as independent entities in addition to material things. This view implies that, at least in principle, minds can exist without bodies. Property dualism is another view, saying that mind and matter are not independent entities but different properties that apply to the same individual. Monist views, by contrast, state that reality is made up of only one kind. According to metaphysical idealists, for instance, everything is mental. (Note: There are other forms of idealism that assert slightly different positions, such as transcendental idealism and absolute idealism.) They understand material things as mental phenomena, for example, as ideas or perceptions. According to neutral monists, by contrast, the world is at its most fundamental level neither physical nor mental but neutral. They see physical and mental concepts as convenient but superficial ways to describe reality.

The monist view most influential since the 20th century has been physicalism, also referred to as materialism, (Note: The two terms are usually treated as synonyms but some theorists distinguish them by holding that materialism is restricted to matter while physicalism is a wider term that includes additional physical phenomena, like forces.) which states that everything is physical. According to eliminative physicalism, there are no mental phenomena, meaning that things like beliefs and desires do not form part of reality. Reductive physicalists defend a less radical position: they say that mental states exist but can, at least in principle, be completely described by physics without the need for special sciences like psychology. For example, behaviorists aim to analyze mental concepts in terms of observable behavior without resorting to internal mental states. Type identity theory also belongs to reductive physicalism and says that mental states are the same as brain states. While non-reductive physicalists agree that everything is physical, they say that mental concepts describe physical reality on a more abstract level that cannot be articulated by physics. According to functionalism, mental concepts do not describe the internal constitution of physical substances but functional roles within a system. One consequence of this view is that mind does not depend on brains but can also be realized by other systems that implement the corresponding functional roles, possibly also computers. A different approach, found in the tradition of phenomenology, aims to dissolve the mind–body problem by arguing that it is based on an artificial dichotomy not present in the phenomenological description of experience.

The hard problem of consciousness is a central aspect of the mind–body problem: it is the challenge of explaining how physical states can give rise to conscious experience. Its main difficulty lies in the subjective and qualitative nature of consciousness, which is unlike typical physical processes. The hard problem of consciousness contrasts with the "easy problems" of explaining how certain aspects of consciousness function, such as perception, memory, or learning.

=== Brain areas and processes ===
Another approach to the relation between mind and matter uses empirical observation to study how the brain works and which brain areas and processes are associated with specific mental phenomena. The brain is the central organ of the nervous system and is present in all vertebrates and the majority of invertebrates. The human brain is of particular complexity and consists of about 86 billion neurons, which communicate with one another via synapses. They form a complex neural network and cognitive processes emerge from their electrical and chemical interactions. The human brain is divided into regions that are associated with different functions. The main regions are the hindbrain, midbrain, and forebrain. Many biological functions associated with basic survival are the responsibility of the hindbrain and midbrain. Higher mental functions, ranging from thoughts to motivation, are primarily localized in the forebrain.

The cerebral cortex is divided into various areas with distinct functions, like the prefrontal cortex (shown in orange) responsible for executive functions.

The primary operations of many of the main mental phenomena are located in specific areas of the forebrain. The prefrontal cortex is responsible for executive functions, such as planning, decision-making, problem-solving, and working memory. The sensory cortex processes and interprets sensory information, with different subareas dedicated to different senses, like the visual and the auditory areas. A central function of the hippocampus is the formation and retrieval of long-term memories. It belongs to the limbic system, which plays a key role in the regulation of emotions through the amygdala. The motor cortex is responsible for planning, executing, and controlling voluntary movements. Broca's area is a separate region dedicated to speech production. The activity of the different areas is additionally influenced by neurotransmitters, which are signaling molecules that enhance or inhibit different types of neural communication. For example, dopamine influences motivation and pleasure while serotonin affects mood and appetite.

The close interrelation of brain processes and the mind is seen by the effect that physical changes of the brain have on the mind. For instance, the consumption of psychoactive drugs, like caffeine, antidepressants, alcohol, and psychedelics, temporarily affects brain chemistry with diverse effects on the mind, ranging from increased attention to mood changes, impaired cognitive functions, and hallucinations. Long-term changes to the brain in the form of neurodegenerative diseases and brain injuries can lead to permanent alterations in mental functions. Alzheimer's disease in its first stage deteriorates the hippocampus, reducing the ability to form new memories and recall existing ones. An often-cited case of the effects of brain injury is Phineas Gage, whose prefrontal cortex was severely damaged during a work accident when an iron rod pierced through his skull and brain. Gage survived the accident but his personality and social attitude changed significantly as he became more impulsive, irritable, and anti-social while showing little regard for social conventions and an impaired ability to plan and make rational decisions. Not all these changes were permanent and Gage managed to recover and adapt in some areas.

== Development ==
=== Evolution ===
The mind has a long evolutionary history starting with the development of the nervous system and the brain. While it is generally accepted today that mind is not exclusive to humans and various non-human animals have some form of mind, there is no consensus at which point exactly the mind emerged. The evolution of mind is usually explained in terms of natural selection: genetic variations responsible for new or improved mental capacities, such as better perception or social dispositions, have an increased chance of being passed on to future generations if they are beneficial to survival and reproduction.

Minimal forms of information processing are already found in the earliest forms of life 4 to 3.5 billion years ago, like the abilities of bacteria and eukaryotic unicellular organisms to sense the environment, store this information, and react to it. Nerve cells emerged with the development of multicellular organisms more than 600 million years ago as a way to process and transmit information. About 600 to 550 million years ago, an evolutionary bifurcation happened into radially symmetric organisms (Note: They include cnidarians and ctenophorans.) with ring-shaped nervous systems or a nerve net, like jellyfish, and organisms with bilaterally symmetric bodies, whose nervous systems tend to be more centralized. About 540 million years ago, vertebrates evolved within the group of bilaterally organized organisms. Vertebrates, like birds and mammals, have a central nervous system including a complex brain with specialized functions. Invertebrates, like clams and insects, typically either have no or relatively simple brains. In the course of evolution, the brains of vertebrates tended to grow and the specialization of different brain areas tended to increase. These developments are closely related to changes in limb structures, sense organs, and living conditions with a close correspondence between the size of a brain area and the importance of its function to the organism. An important step in the evolution of mammals about 200 million years ago was the development of the neocortex, which is responsible for many higher-order brain functions.

The size of the brain relative to the body further increased with the development of primates, like monkeys, about 65 million years ago and later with the emergence of the first hominins about 7–5 million years ago. Anatomically modern humans appeared about 300,000 to 200,000 years ago. Various theories of the evolutionary processes responsible for human intelligence have been proposed. The social intelligence hypothesis says that the evolution of the human mind was triggered by the increased importance of social life and its emphasis on mental abilities associated with empathy, knowledge transfer, and meta-cognition. According to the ecological intelligence hypothesis, the main value of the increased mental capacities comes from their advantages in dealing with a complex physical environment through processes like behavioral flexibility, learning, and tool use. Other suggested mechanisms include the effects of a changed diet with energy-rich food and general benefits from an increased speed and efficiency of information processing. Some models propose that another major cognitive shift occurred possibly 50,000 to 40,000 years ago. Called behavioral modernity, it is associated with the emergence of new or improved mental abilities, such as technological innovativeness, abstract thinking, the use of symbols, planning, and social coordination.

=== Individual ===
Besides the development of mind in general in the course of history, individual human minds also develop in the course of their lifetime. Some of the individual changes vary from person to person as a form of learning from experience, like forming specific memories or acquiring particular behavioral patterns. Others are more universal developments as psychological stages that all or most humans go through as they pass through early childhood, adolescence, adulthood, and old age. These developments cover various areas, including intellectual, sensorimotor, linguistic, emotional, social, and moral developments. Some factors affect the development of mind before birth, such as nutrition, maternal stress, and exposure to harmful substances like alcohol during pregnancy.

Early childhood is marked by rapid developments as infants learn voluntary control over their bodies and interact with their environment on a basic level. Typically after about one year, this covers abilities like walking, recognizing familiar faces, and producing individual words. On the emotional and social levels, they develop attachments with their primary caretakers and express emotions ranging from joy and surprise to fear and anger. An influential theory by Jean Piaget divides the cognitive development of children into four stages. The sensorimotor stage from birth until two years is concerned with sensory impressions and motor activities while learning that objects remain in existence even when not observed. In the preoperational stage until seven years, children learn to interpret and use symbols in an intuitive manner. They start employing logical reasoning to physical objects in the concrete operational stage until eleven years and extend this capacity in the following formal operational stage to abstract ideas, probabilities, and possibilities. Other important processes shaping the mind in this period are socialization and enculturation, at first through primary caretakers and later through peers and the schooling system.

Psychological transformations during adolescence are provoked by physiological developments and by being confronted with a different social situation in the form of new expectations from others. An important factor in this period is change to the self-concept, which can take the form of an identity crisis. This process typically involves developing individuality and independence from parents while at the same time seeking closeness and conformity with friends and peers. Further developments in this period include improvements to the reasoning ability and the formation of a principled moral viewpoint.

The mind also changes during adulthood but in a less rapid and pronounced manner. Reasoning and problem-solving skills improve during early and middle adulthood. Some people experience the mid-life transition as a midlife crisis involving an inner conflict about personal identity, associated with anxiety, a sense of a lack of accomplishments in life, or an awareness of mortality. Intellectual faculties tend to decline in later adulthood, specifically the ability to learn complex unfamiliar tasks and later also the ability to remember. At the same time, people tend to become more inward-looking and cautious.

== Non-human ==
=== Animal ===
It is commonly acknowledged today that animals have some form of mind, but it is controversial to which animals this applies and how their mind differs from the human mind. Different conceptions of the mind lead to different responses to this problem. When understood in a very wide sense as the capacity to process information, the mind is present in all forms of life, including insects, plants, and individual cells. On the other side of the spectrum are views that deny the existence of mentality in most or all non-human animals based on the idea that they lack key mental capacities, like abstract rationality and symbolic language. The status of animal minds is highly relevant to the field of ethics since it affects the treatment of animals, including the topic of animal rights.

Discontinuity views state that the minds of non-human animals are fundamentally different from human minds and often point to higher mental faculties, like thinking, reasoning, and deliberate decision-making. This outlook is reflected in the traditionally influential position of defining humans as "rational animals" as opposed to all other animals. Continuity views, by contrast, emphasize similarities and see cognitive differences in degree rather than kind. Central considerations for this position are the shared evolutionary origin and organic similarities on the level of the brain and nervous system. Observable behavior is another key factor, such as problem-solving skills, animal communication, and reactions to and expressions of pain and pleasure. Of particular importance are the questions of consciousness and sentience, that is, to what extent non-human animals have a subjective experience of the world and are capable of suffering and feeling joy.

=== Artificial ===
Some of the difficulties of assessing animal minds are also reflected in the topic of artificial minds. It includes the question of whether computer systems implementing artificial intelligence should be considered a form of mind. This idea is consistent with some theories of the nature of mind, such as functionalism and its claim that mental concepts describe functional roles. It asserts that the functions implemented by biological brains could in principle also be implemented by artificial devices.

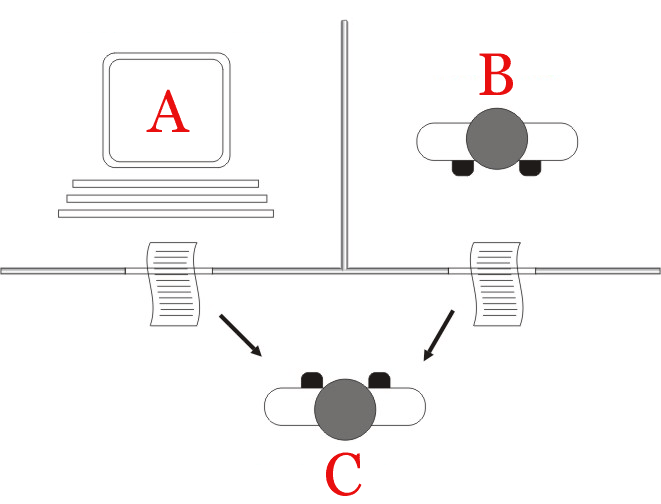
The Turing test aims to determine whether a computer can imitate human linguistic behavior to the degree that it is not possible to tell the difference between human and computer.

The Turing test, proposed by Alan Turing (1912–1954), is a traditionally influential procedure to test artificial intelligence: a person exchanges messages with two parties, one of them a human and the other a computer. The computer passes the test if it is not possible to reliably tell which party is the human and which one the computer. While there are computer programs today that may pass the Turing test, this alone is usually not accepted as conclusive proof of mindedness. For some aspects of mind, it is controversial whether computers can, in principle, implement them, such as desires, feelings, consciousness, and free will.

This problem is often discussed through the contrast between weak and strong artificial intelligence. Weak or narrow artificial intelligence is limited to specific mental capacities or functions. It focuses on a particular task or a narrow set of tasks, like autonomous driving, speech recognition, or theorem proving. The goal of strong AI, also termed artificial general intelligence, is to create a complete artificial person that has all the mental capacities of humans, including consciousness, emotion, and reason. It is controversial whether strong AI is possible; influential arguments against it include John Searle's Chinese Room Argument and Hubert Dreyfus's critique based on Heideggerian philosophy.

== Mental health and disorder ==
Mental health is a state of mind characterized by internal equilibrium and well-being in which mental capacities function as they should. Some theorists emphasize positive features such as the abilities of a person to realize their potential, express and modulate emotions, cope with adverse life situations, and fulfill their social role. Negative definitions, by contrast, see mental health as the absence of mental disorders. Mental disorders are abnormal patterns of thought, emotion, or behavior. These patterns deviate not only from how a mental capacity works on average but from how it should work while usually causing some form of distress. The content of those norms is controversial and there are differences from culture to culture. For instance, homosexuality was historically considered a mental disorder by medical professionals, a view which only changed in the second half of the 20th century.

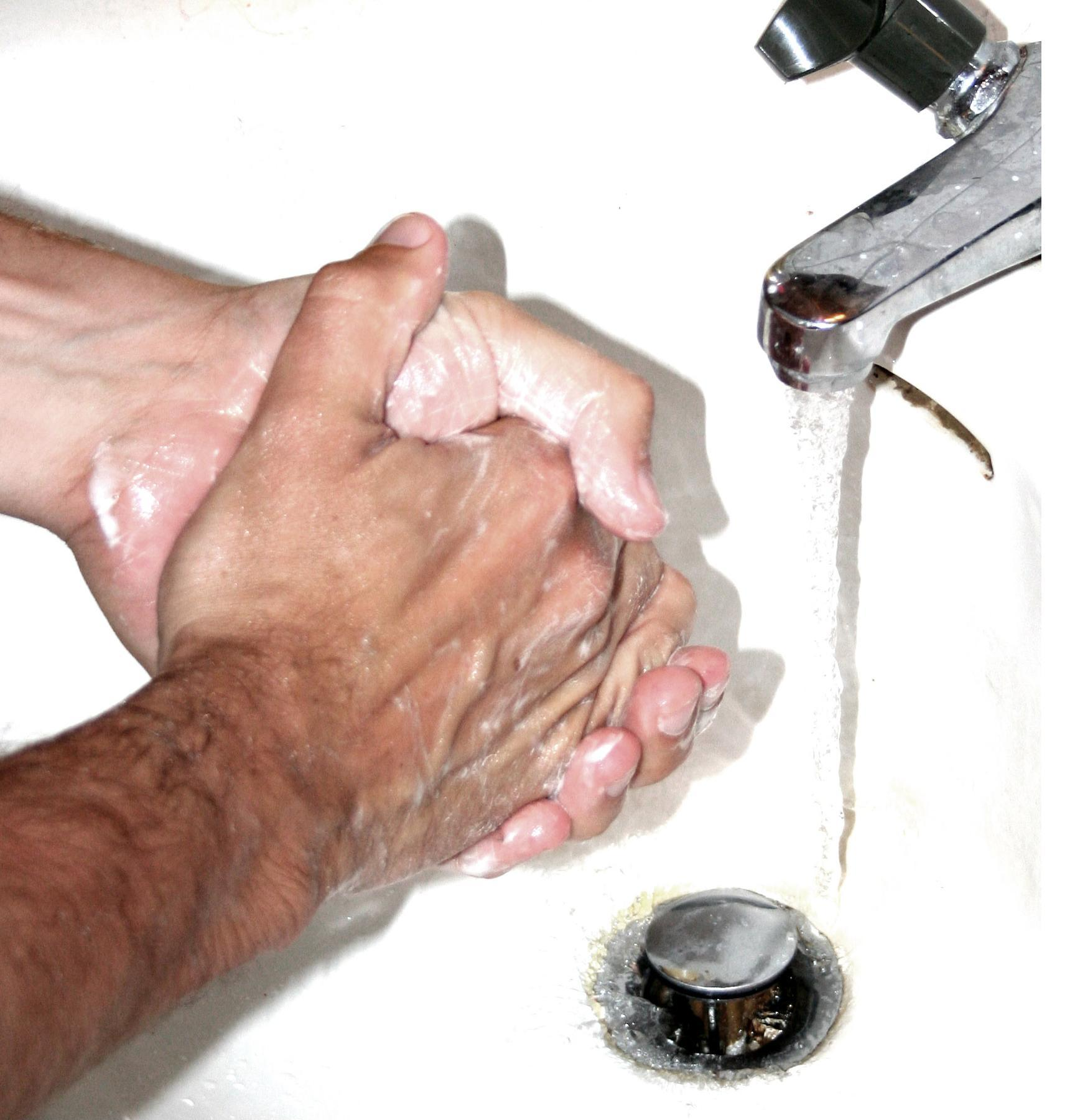
Obsessive–compulsive disorder is a mental disorder in which a person follows compulsive rituals, like excessive hand washing, to alleviate anxiety caused by intrusive thoughts.

There is a great variety of mental disorders, each associated with a different form of malfunctioning. Anxiety disorders involve intense and persistent fear that is disproportionate to the actual threat and significantly impairs everyday life. An example is social phobia, which involves irrational fear of certain social situations. Anxiety disorders also include obsessive–compulsive disorder, for which the anxiety manifests in the form of intrusive thoughts that the person tries to alleviate by following compulsive rituals. Mood disorders cause intense moods or mood swings that are inconsistent with the external circumstances and can last for long periods. For instance, people affected by bipolar disorder experience extreme mood swings between manic states of euphoria and depressive states of hopelessness. Personality disorders are characterized by enduring patterns of maladaptive behavior that significantly impair regular life. Paranoid personality disorder, for example, leads people to be deeply suspicious of the motives of others without rational basis. Psychotic disorders are among the most severe mental illnesses and involve a distorted relation to reality in the form of hallucinations and delusions, as seen in schizophrenia. Other disorders include dissociative disorders and eating disorders.

The biopsychosocial model identifies three types of causes of mental disorders: biological, cognitive, and environmental factors. Biological factors include bodily causes, in particular neurological influences and genetic predispositions. On the cognitive level, maladaptive beliefs and patterns of thought can be responsible. Environmental factors involve cultural influences and social events that may trigger the onset of a disorder. There are various approaches to treating mental disorders, and the most suitable treatment usually depends on the type of disorder, its cause, and the individual's overall condition. Psychotherapeutic methods use personal interaction with a therapist to change patterns of thinking, feeling, and acting. Psychoanalysis aims to help patients resolve conflicts between the conscious and the unconscious mind. Cognitive behavioral therapy focuses on conscious mental phenomena to identify and change irrational beliefs and negative thought patterns. Behavior therapy relies on classical conditioning to unlearn harmful behaviors. Humanistic therapies try to help people gain insight into their self-worth and empower them to resolve their problems. Drug therapies use medication to alter the brain chemistry involved in the disorder through substances like antidepressants, antipsychotics, mood stabilizers, and anxiolytics.

== Fields and methods of inquiry ==
Various fields of inquiry study the mind, including psychology, neuroscience, philosophy, and cognitive science. They differ from each other in the aspects of mind they investigate and the methods they employ. The study of the mind poses various problems since it is difficult to directly examine, manipulate, and measure it. Trying to circumvent this problem by investigating the brain comes with new challenges of its own, mainly because of the brain's complexity as a neural network consisting of billions of neurons, each with up to 10,000 links to other neurons.

=== Psychology ===
Psychology is the scientific study of mind and behavior. It investigates conscious and unconscious mental phenomena, including perception, memory, feeling, thought, decision, intelligence, and personality. It is further interested in their outward manifestation in the form of observable behavioral patterns, studying how these patterns depend on external circumstances and are shaped by learning. Psychology is a wide discipline that includes many subfields. Cognitive psychology is interested in higher-order mental activities like thinking, problem-solving, reasoning, and concept formation. Biological psychology seeks to understand the underlying mechanisms on the physiological level and how they depend on genetic transmission and the environment. Developmental psychology studies the development of the mind from childhood to old age while social psychology examines the influence of social contexts on mind and behavior. Personality psychology investigates personality, exploring how characteristic patterns of thought, feeling, and behavior develop and vary among individuals. Further subfields include comparative, clinical, educational, occupational, and neuropsychology. As a scientific discipline, psychology emerged at the end of the 19th century from the experimental work of Wilhelm Wundt (1832–1920). Early schools of thought included structuralism, psychoanalysis, Gestalt psychology, functionalism, and behaviorism.

Psychologists use a great variety of methods to study the mind. Experimental approaches set up a controlled situation, either in the laboratory or the field, in which they modify independent variables and measure their effects on dependent variables. (Note: Psychometrics examines how to measure the mental attributes or psychological constructs underlying the variables. For example, IQ tests are one way to quantify intelligence.) This approach makes it possible to identify causal relations between the variables. For example, to determine whether people with similar interests (independent variable) are more likely to become friends (dependent variable), participants in a study could be paired with either similar or dissimilar participants. After giving the pairs time to interact, it is assessed whether the members of similar pairs have more positive attitudes toward one another than the members of dissimilar pairs.

Correlational methods examine the strength of association between two variables without establishing a causal relationship between them. The survey method presents participants with a list of questions aimed at eliciting information about their mental attitudes, behavior, and other relevant factors. It analyzes how participants respond to questions and how answers to different questions correlate with one another. Surveys usually have a large number of participants in contrast to case studies, which focus on an in-depth examination of a single subject or a small group of subjects, often to examine rare phenomena or explore new fields. Further methods include longitudinal studies, naturalistic observation, and phenomenological description of experience.

=== Neuroscience ===
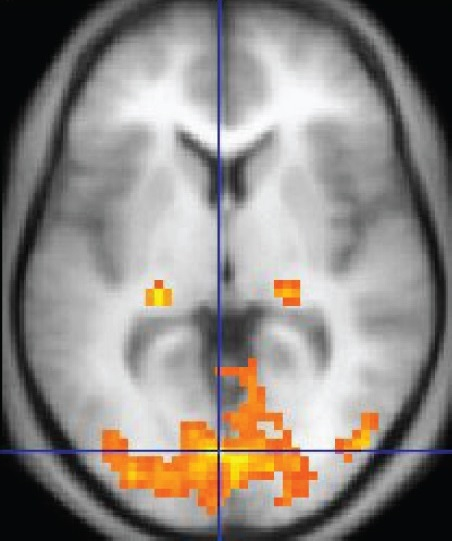
Functional magnetic resonance imaging is a neuroimaging technique to detect brain areas with increased neural activity (shown in orange).

Neuroscience is the study of the nervous system. Its primary focus is the central nervous system and the brain in particular, but it also investigates the peripheral nervous system mainly responsible for connecting the central nervous system to the limbs and organs. Neuroscience examines the implementation of mental phenomena on a physiological basis, covering various levels of analysis. On the small scale, it studies the molecular and cellular basis of the mind, dealing with the constitution of and interaction between individual neurons. On the large scale, it analyzes the architecture of the brain as a whole and its division into regions with different functions. The study of the nervous system began in the ancient period and evolved through the centuries, including anatomical insights through dissections and speculative theories about brain functions. Neuroscience was recognized as a distinct academic discipline in the 20th century as technological advances, like the development of neuroimaging techniques, revolutionized the field.

In modern neuroscience, neuroimaging techniques are of particular importance as the main research methods of neuroscientists. Functional magnetic resonance imaging (fMRI) measures changes in the magnetic field of the brain associated with blood flow. Areas of increased blood flow indicate that the corresponding brain region is particularly active. Positron emission tomography (PET) uses radioactive substances to detect a range of metabolic changes in the brain. Electroencephalography (EEG) measures the electrical activity of the brain, usually by placing electrodes on the scalp and measuring the voltage differences between them. These techniques are often employed to measure brain changes under particular circumstances, for example, while engaged in a specific cognitive task. Important insights are also gained from patients and laboratory animals with brain damage, helping neuroscientists understand the function of the damaged area and how its absence affects the remaining brain.

=== Philosophy of mind ===
Philosophy of mind examines the nature of mental phenomena and their relation to the physical world. It seeks to understand the "mark of the mental", that is, the features that all mental states have in common. It further investigates the essence of different types of mental phenomena, such as beliefs, desires, emotions, intentionality, and consciousness while exploring how they are related to one another. Philosophy of mind also examines solutions to the mind–body problem, like dualism, idealism, and physicalism, and assesses arguments for and against them. It asks whether people have a free will or the ability to choose their actions, and how this ability contrasts with the idea that everything is determined by preceding causes.

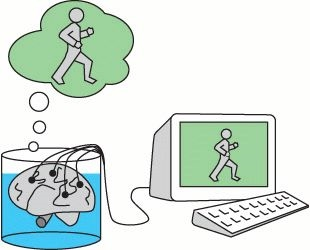
The brain in a vat is a thought experiment to examine the nature of the mind and its relation to matter. It explores how a brain would experience reality if a supercomputer fed it the same electrical stimulation a normal brain receives.

While philosophers of mind also include empirical considerations in their inquiry, they differ from fields like psychology and neuroscience by giving significantly more emphasis to non-empirical forms of inquiry. One such method is conceptual analysis, which aims to clarify the meaning of concepts, like mind and intention, by decomposing them to identify their semantic parts. Thought experiments are often used to evoke intuitions about abstract theories to assess their coherence and plausibility. To do so, philosophers imagine a situation relevant to a theory and employ counterfactual thinking to assess the possible consequences of this theory. Influential thought experiments include Mary the color scientist, philosophical zombies, and brain in a vat-scenarios. Because of the subjective nature of the mind, the phenomenological method is also commonly used to analyze the structure of consciousness by describing experience from the first-person perspective. The philosophical discussion of the mind has a long history, reaching back to antiquity. Influential contributions were made by Plato (c. 428–347 BCE), Aristotle (384–322 BCE), René Descartes (1596–1650), David Hume (1711–1776), Immanuel Kant (1724–1804), William James (1842–1910), and Gilbert Ryle (1900–1976).

=== Cognitive science ===
Cognitive science is the interdisciplinary study of mental representations and processes. It aims to overcome the challenge of understanding something as complex as the mind by integrating research from diverse fields ranging from psychology and neuroscience to philosophy, linguistics, and artificial intelligence. Unlike these disciplines, it is not a unified field but a collaborative effort. One difficulty in synthesizing their insights is that each of these disciplines explores the mind from a different perspective and level of abstraction while using different research methods to arrive at its conclusion. Cognitive science emerged in the second half of the 20th century as researchers from various disciplines began to examine how mental processes represent the world and transform information. The field expanded in the 1980s following advances in neuroimaging to include a biological perspective on how computational processes are implemented by the brain.

To incorporate insights from diverse disciplines, cognitive science relies on a unified conceptualization of minds as information processors. This means that mental processes are understood as computations that retrieve, transform, store, and transmit information. For example, perception retrieves sensory information from the environment and transforms it to extract meaningful patterns that can be used in other mental processes, such as planning and decision-making. Cognitive science relies on different levels of description to analyze cognitive processes. The most abstract level focuses on the basic problem the process is supposed to solve and the reasons why the organism needs to solve it. The intermediate level seeks to uncover the algorithm as a formal step-by-step procedure to solve the problem. The most concrete level asks how the algorithm is implemented through physiological changes on the level of the brain. Another methodology is to analyze the mind as a complex system composed of individual subsystems that can be studied independently of one another. This analytic approach is complemented by the binding problem—the challenge of explaining how the information computed in distinct neural regions is integrated to form coherent object representations.

== Relation to other fields ==
The mind is relevant to many fields. In epistemology, the problem of other minds is the challenge of explaining how it is possible to know that people other than oneself have a mind. The difficulty arises from the fact that people directly experience their own minds but do not have the same access to the minds of others. According to a common view, it is necessary to rely on perception to observe the behavior of others and then infer that they have a mind based on analogical or abductive reasoning. Closely related to this problem is theory of mind in psychology, which is the ability to understand that other people possess beliefs, desires, intentions, and feelings that may differ from one's own.

Anthropology is interested in how different cultures conceptualize the nature of mind and its relation to the world. These conceptualizations affect the way people understand themselves, experience illness, and interpret ritualistic practices as attempts to commune with spirits. Some cultures do not draw a strict boundary between mind and world by allowing that thoughts can pass directly into the world and manifest as beneficial or harmful forces. For instance, some indigenous beliefs systems, like traditional beliefs in the Azande culture, hold that angry thoughts can directly damage another person's crops or make them ill. Other cultures strictly separate the mind from external reality, seeing it as an internal phenomenon without supernatural powers. Sociology is a related field concerned with the connections between mind, society, and behavior. Among other topics, it is interested in the phenomenon of intersubjectivity, which happens when different people have a shared understanding or experience, meaning that their cognitive perspectives overlap.

The concept of mind plays a central role in various religions. Buddhists say that there is no enduring self underlying mental activity. They analyze the mind as a stream of constantly changing experiences characterized by five aspects or "aggregates": material form, feelings, perception, volition, and consciousness. Hindus, by contrast, affirm the existence of a permanent self. In an influential analogy, the human mind is compared to a horse-drawn chariot: the horses are the senses, which lure the sense mind corresponding to the reins through sensual pleasures. The senses are controlled by the charioteer embodying the intellect while the self is a passenger. In traditional Christian philosophy, mind and soul are closely intertwined as the immaterial aspect of humans that may survive bodily death. Islamic thought distinguishes between mind, spirit, heart, and self as interconnected aspects of the spiritual dimension of humans. Daoism and Confucianism use the concept of heart-mind as the center of cognitive and emotional life, encompassing thought, understanding, will, desire, and mood.

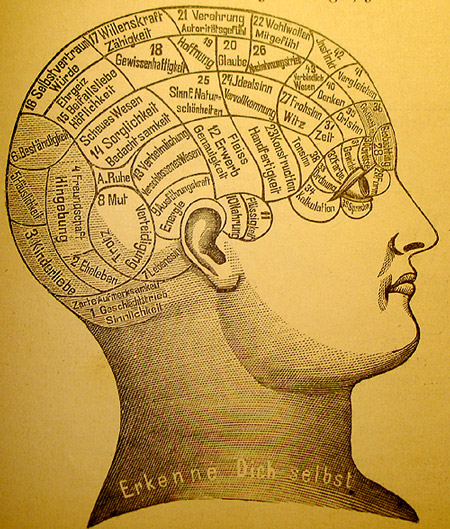
Phrenology was a pseudoscientific attempt to correlate mental functions to brain areas.

In the field of education, the minds of students are shaped through the transmission of knowledge, skills, and character traits as a process of socialization and enculturation. This is achieved through different teaching methods including the contrast between group work and individual learning and the use of instructional media. Teacher-centered education positions the teacher as the central authority controlling the learning process whereas in student-centered education, students have a more active role in shaping classroom activities. The choice of the most effective method to develop the minds of the learners is determined by various factors, including the topic and the learner's age and skill level.

The mind is a frequent subject of pseudoscientific inquiry. Phrenology was an early attempt to correlate mental functions with specific brain areas. While its central claims about predicting mental traits by measuring bumps on the skull did not survive scientific scrutiny, the underlying idea that certain mental functions are localized in particular regions of the brain is now widely accepted. Parapsychologists seek to discover and study paranormal mental abilities ranging from clairvoyance to telepathy and telekinesis.

== See also ==
- Animal consciousness
- Biological naturalism – Theory about the relationship between consciousness and body
- Conscience – Moral philosophy or values of an individual
- Emergent materialism – Philosophical concept
- Explanatory gap – Inability to describe conscious experiences in solely physical or structural terms
- Ideasthesia – Phenomenon in which concepts evoke sensory experiences
- List of philosophers of mind
- Mental energy – Capacity for cognitive work
- Mind at Large – Theory of psychedelic experience
- Neural Darwinism – Theory in neurology
- Outline of human intelligence
- Outline of thought – Overview of and topical guide to thought
- Subjective character of experience – Psychology term
