= List of Icelandic philosophers =

This is a list of notable Icelandic philosophers:

== A ==
- Arnór Hannibalsson

== B ==
- Brynjólfur Bjarnason

== G ==
- Guðmundur Finnbogason

== H ==
- Hannes Hólmsteinn Gissurarson

== J ==
- Jón Ólafsson of Grunnavík

== O ==
- Oddný Eir Ævarsdóttir

== P ==
- Páll Skúlason

== V ==
- Vilhjálmur Árnason

== Á ==
- Ágúst H. Bjarnason
- Ásta Kristjana Sveinsdóttir

== Þ ==
- Þorsteinn Gylfason
