= Rachel Lark =

Folk punk singer/songwriter

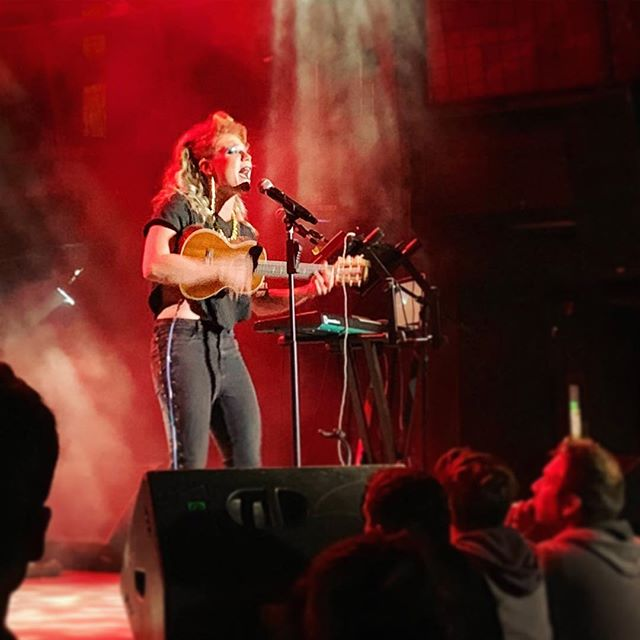
Rachel Lark at the DNA Lounge

Rachel Lark is a composer, multi-instrumentalist and folk punk singer-songwriter based in New York City and the Bay Area. Known for her sex-positive songs and activism, she has been regularly featured on Savage Love with Dan Savage. Rachel is also a writer of theatrical musicals, screenplays, and TV.

== Career ==
In 2014, Lark released her first album, Lark After Dark, followed by her debut music video, "Warm, Bloody and Tender", which she funded through a Kickstarter campaign and produced herself. "Warm, Bloody, and Tender" features cameo performances from the writer and activist Dan Savage and local San Francisco sex-positive activists Jamie DeWolf, Polly Superstar, Dixie De La Tour, Sister Flora Goodthyme, Wonder Dave, Laika Fox, and Paige Goedkoop. Soon after, Lark began touring the U.S. and Europe regularly, playing festivals, comedy clubs and colleges and building a die-hard cult following among the poly, sex-positive and queer communities, as well as academics and podcast fans. During the COVID pandemic, while production for her original musical, Coming Soon, was on hold, Lark brought actors and musicians together to create a concept album based on the show. Coming Soon: The Pandemic Sessions was released in May 2021. Rachel Lark is the creator and composer of "Coming Soon: A New Rock Musical" about a woman's journey to stop faking her orgasms. The show had a sold out run at Z Space in San Francisco in 2022. A review in the San Francisco Chronicle hailed it as "the sex musical for both inhibited normies and kink veterans".

== Personal life ==
Lark’s parents Louise Antony and Joseph Levine are both philosophers at University of Massachusetts Amherst. Lark is also known for her activism and advocacy work in women's rights and sex-positive feminism.

In 2017, she began making trips to Tijuana to translate and advocate for asylum seekers at the border, and worked to match asylum seekers with U.S. sponsors to get them out of ICE detention.

== Discography ==
=== Studio albums ===
- I Wouldn't Worry EP (2013)
- Lark After Dark LP (2014)
- Hung for the Holidays LP (2014)
- Vagenius LP (2015)
- They've Done Studies LP (2017)
- Sex & Balances EP (2020)
- Coming Soon EP (2022)
- Live at the Independent LP (2023)
- Warm By The Dumpster Fire LP (2023)

=== Singles ===
- "Warm, Bloody and Tender" (2015)
- "Naughty Bits" (2018)
- "National Emergency" (2019)
- "The Unicorn Song" (2020)
- "After You Say Sorry" (2023)
