= Richard Moran (philosopher) =

American philosopher

- Born: 1953 (age 72–73)

Education
- Education: Dartmouth College (BA); Cornell University (PhD)
- Thesis: Attitudes Toward the Self (1989)
- Doctoral advisor: Sydney Shoemaker

Philosophical work
- Era: Contemporary philosophy
- Region: Western philosophy
- School: Analytic philosophy
- Institutions: Princeton University, Harvard University
- Main interests: Philosophy of mind, moral psychology, epistemology, aesthetics
- Notable ideas: Agentialist account of self-knowledge

Richard Moran (/məˈrɑːn/; born 1953) is an American philosopher. He is Brian D. Young Professor of Philosophy at Harvard University, where he specializes in philosophy of mind, moral psychology, and philosophy of art.

== Education and career ==
Moran received an AB from Dartmouth College in 1977 and a PhD from Cornell University in 1989, the latter under the supervision of Sydney Shoemaker. He joined the faculty at Princeton University as an assistant professor that same year. He accepted a tenured offer to teach in the Department of Philosophy at Harvard University in Fall 1995.

== Philosophical work ==
Moran has written several books including Authority and Estrangement: An Essay on Self-Knowledge (2001), The Philosophical Imagination (2017), and The Exchange of Words: Speech, Testimony, and Intersubjectivity (2018).
