= List of Romanian philosophers =

This is a list of Romanian philosophers.

- Petre Andrei
- Simion Bărnuțiu
- Ştefan Bârsănescu
- Lucian Blaga
- Dimitrie Cantemir
- Emil Cioran
- Vasile Conta
- Alexandru Dragomir
- Mihai Dragomirescu
- Mihai Drăgănescu
- Mircea Eliade
- Gheorghe Enescu
- Mircea E. Florian
- Dumitru Gheorghiu
- Constantin Grecu
- Nae Ionescu
- Sorin Lavric
- Gabriel Liiceanu
- Stéphane Lupasco
- Virgil Nemoianu
- Constantin Noica
- Camil Petrescu
- Ion Petrovici
- Mihai Ralea
- Constantin Rădulescu-Motru
- Dumitru D. Roșca
- Alexandru Tănase
- Tudor Vianu
- Mircea Vulcănescu
- A.D. Xenopol
