= Guðmundur Finnbogason =

Icelandic psychologist, philosopher, librarian

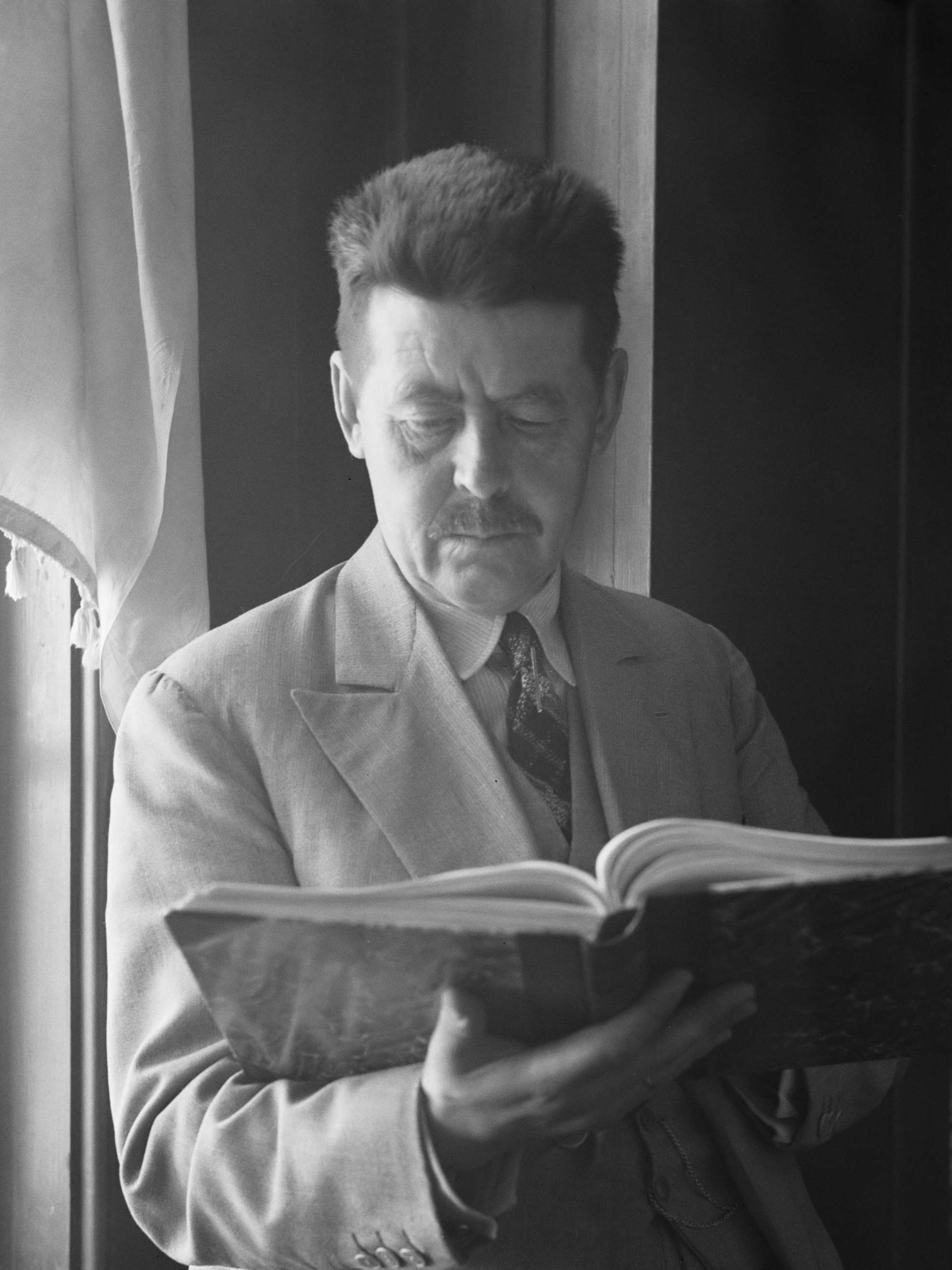
Guðmundur Finnbogason (1934)

Guðmundur Finnbogason (June 6, 1873 – July 17, 1944) was an Icelandic philosopher, the son of Guðrún Jónsdóttir and Finnbogi Finnbogason. He was one of the first Icelandic psychologists. His work "Sympathetic Understanding" inspired Jean Piaget's development stages model.

== Career ==
Guðmundur finished his studies at Lærði Skólinn in the spring of 1896. The same year, he began studying philosophy at the University of Copenhagen; he graduated with a master's degree in psychology in 1901. Among his mentors were Harald Høffding and Alfred Lehmann. Lehmann had studied under Wilhelm Wundt in Germany and established a laboratory in Copenhagen in 1886.

During 1901 and 1902 Guðmundur traveled in Scandinavia and gathered information on teaching in these countries. The Icelandic national parliament, the Alþingi, supported him. Based on this research, his first book, Lýðmenntun (People's education), was published in 1903. In it and a report to the parliament the same year, Guðmundur put forward his proposals for the education of children in Iceland. During 1903 and 1904, he traveled in Iceland to gather information on teaching in the country and then wrote another report to parliament. In 1907, a policy for teaching was agreed upon, largely based on Guðmundur's reports.

In 1905 and 1906, Guðmundur was the editor of Skírnir and also did some translation. Among others, he translated William James' lecture about human immortality and an article by Henri Bergson. He again served as editor of Skírnir from 1913 to 1920 and from 1933 to 1943.

In 1908 to 1910 Guðmundur worked on his PhD thesis for the University of Copenhagen, titled Samúðarskilningurinn (Sympathetic understanding). His thesis defence took place in 1911, and his book on the same topic, Hugur og heimur (Mind and the universe), was published in 1912.

During the same period as Guðmundur was completing and defending his thesis, the University of Iceland was founded and a professorship in philosophy was founded at the school. Guðmundur applied for the position, but Ágúst H. Bjarnason was appointed instead. Guðmundur became head of the Icelandic National Library. In 1918 he was appointed professor at the University, and served in that position until 1924, teaching applied psychology and performing experiments with students.
