= List of Afghan philosophers =

This is a list of notable Afghan philosophers.

== F ==
- Abu Nasr Muhammad al-Farabi (872‍–‍951) - "Father of Islamic Neoplatonism"

== J ==
- Jamal ad-Din al-Afghani (1838‍–‍1897) - One of the founders of Islamic Modernism

== N ==
- Ibrahim al-Nazzam (760‍–‍835) - Mu'tazilite theologian and Quran literalist

== R ==
- Ibn al-Rawandi (827‍–‍911) - Early Muslim skeptic

== S ==
- Sediq Afghan (1958‍–‍) - Founder of the World Philosophical Math Research Center in Kabul
- Saifuddin Jalal (1958‍–‍)
- Sayed Hassan Akhlaq (1976‍–‍)
