= Ágúst H. Bjarnason =

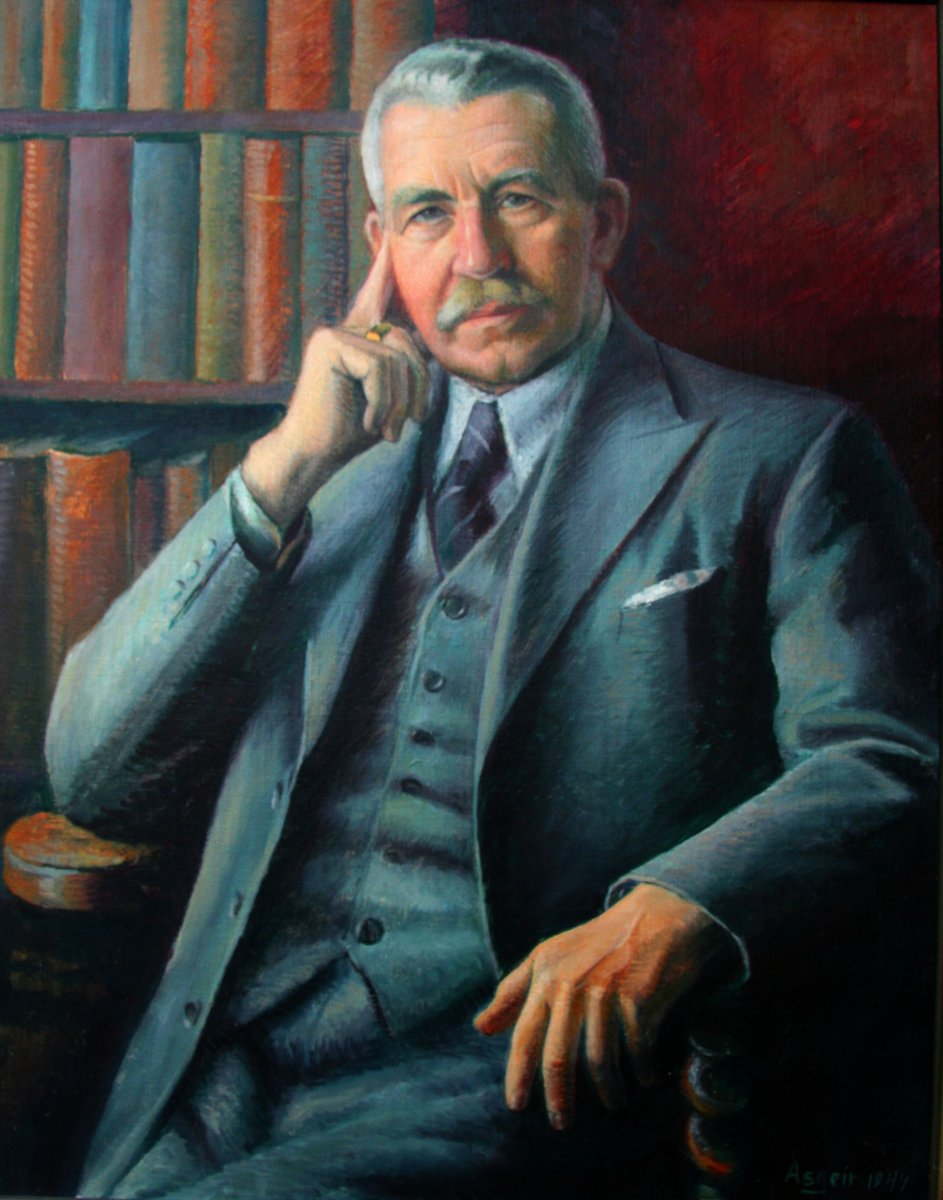

Ágúst H. Bjarnason (20 August 1875 – 22 September 1952) was the son of Hákon Bjarnason, and Jóhanna K. Þorleifsdóttir. Ágúst was a pioneer in teaching psychology in Iceland and the first one to write books on psychology in Icelandic.

A revolution begin in Icelandic psychological history when Ágúst and Guðmundur Finnbogason went to study psychology and philosophy at University of Copenhagen. They both finished master's degrees in 1901 and then doctorals in 1911. They both had psychology as majors. The mentor of Ágúst (and Guðmundur) was Harald Høffding. Ágúst's doctoral dissertation was about the French philosopher Jean-Marie Guyau.

He was a Unitarian, describing himself as Iceland's "only card-carrying Unitarian."

== Bibliography ==
=== Books ===
- Bjarnason, Ágúst H. (1959). Saga mannsandans. Reykjavík, Iceland: Hlaðbúð. OCLC 64688566.
- Bjarnason, Ágúst H. (1926). Himingeimurinn. Akureyri, Iceland: P.M. Jónsson. OCLC 62455324.
