= Sydney Shoemaker =

American philosopher (1931–2022)

- Born: Sydney Sharpless Shoemaker; September 29, 1931; Boise, Idaho, U.S.
- Died: September 3, 2022 (aged 90); Ithaca, New York, U.S.

Education
- Education: Reed College; Cornell University (Ph.D., 1958)
- Thesis: Self-Knowledge and Self-Identity (1958)
- Doctoral advisor: Norman Malcolm

Philosophical work
- Era: 20th-century philosophy
- Region: Western philosophy
- School: Analytic philosophy Representationalism
- Institutions: Ohio State University; Cornell University; Rockefeller University
- Doctoral students: Richard Moran; Susanna Siegel
- Notable students: John Perry
- Main interests: Philosophy of mind, metaphysics
- Notable ideas: Immunity to error through misidentification in first-person self-ascription Quasi-memory

Sydney Sharpless Shoemaker (September 29, 1931 – September 3, 2022) was an American philosopher. He was the Susan Linn Sage Professor of Philosophy at Cornell University and is well known for his contributions to philosophy of mind and metaphysics.

== Education and career ==
Shoemaker graduated with a Bachelor of Arts from Reed College and earned his Doctor of Philosophy from Cornell University in 1958 under the supervision of Norman Malcolm. He taught philosophy at Ohio State University from 1957 to 1960, then returned to Cornell in 1961 as a faculty member of the philosophy department. In 1978, he was appointed the Susan Linn Sage Professor of Philosophy, a position he held until his retirement as professor emeritus of philosophy.

Among his doctroral students at Cornell were Richard Moran and Susanna Siegel.

In 1971, he delivered the John Locke Lectures at Oxford University.

Shoemaker died on September 3, 2022, at the age of 90. He is buried in Greensprings Natural Cemetery Preserve in Newfield, New York.

== Philosophical work ==
Shoemaker worked primarily in the philosophy of mind and metaphysics, and published many classic papers in both these areas (as well as their overlap). In "Functionalism and Qualia" (1975), for example, he argued that functionalism about mental states can account for the qualitative character (or "raw feel") of mental states. In "Self-Reference and Self-Awareness" (1968), he argued that the phenomenon of absolute "immunity to error through misidentification" is what distinguishes self-attributions of mental states (such as "I see a canary") from self-attributions of physical states (such as "I weigh 200 pounds").

In metaphysics, he defended the view that laws are metaphysically necessary, a position that follows from his view of properties as clusters of conditional causal powers. He also applied his view of properties to the problem of mental causation. He made distinguished contributions to the literature on self-knowledge and personal identity, where he defended a Lockean psychological continuity theory in his influential paper "Persons and their Pasts".

Shoemaker developed his views on personal identity and psychological continuity into a general causal account of identity in terms of persistence. In "Identity, Properties, and Causality" he argues for identity's spatial and temporal dependence on an individual's conditional causal properties. In "Causality and Properties" he further defends his view of properties as individually defined by their causal "potentialities".

In his later work on the content of perception, Shoemaker argued for a distinctive version of representationalism.

== Selected publications ==
=== Books ===
- Self-Knowledge and Self-Identity (1963)
- Personal Identity (co-authored with Richard Swinburne, 1984)
- Identity, Cause and Mind: Philosophical Essays (1984)
- The First-Person Perspective, and other Essays (1996)
- Physical Realization (2007)

=== Articles ===
- 1970, "Persons and their Pasts", American Philosophical Quarterly, pp. 269–285.
- 1988, "On Knowing One's Own Mind", Philosophical Perspectives, pp. 183–209.

== See also ==
- American philosophy
- List of American philosophers
