= List of political philosophers =

This is a list of notable political philosophers, including some who may be better known for their work in other areas of philosophy. The entries are in order by year of birth to show rough direction of influences and of development of political thought.

== Ancient (born before 550 AD) ==
- Hammurabi (died c. 1750 BC)
- Confucius (551–479 BC)
- Socrates (470–399 BC)
- Mozi (470–390 BC)
- Xenophon (427–355 BC)
- Plato (427–347 BC)
- Diogenes of Sinope (412–323 BC)
- Aeschines (389–314 BC)
- Aristotle (384–322 BC)
- Mencius (372–289 BC)
- Chanakya (350–283 BC)
- Xun Zi (310–237 BC)
- Han Fei (c. 280–233 BC)
- Polybius (c. 200-118 BC)
- Cicero (106–43 BC)
- Pliny the Younger (63–113 AD)
- Saint Augustine (354–430 AD)

== Medieval (born between 550 and 1450) ==
- Muhammad (570–632)
- Al-Farabi (870–950)
- Al-Biruni (973–1050)
- Ibn Sina (980–1037)
- Al-Ghazali (1058–1111)
- Averroes (1126–1198)
- Maimonides (1135–1204)
- Fakhr al-Din al-Razi (1150–1210)
- Thomas Aquinas, OP (1225–1274)
- Giles of Rome, OSA (1243–1316)
- Ibn Taymiyyah (1263–1328)
- Marsilius of Padua (1270–1342)
- William of Ockham, OFM (1285–1349)
- Ibn Khaldun (1332–1406)
- Christine de Pizan (1363–1434)
- Jean Gerson (1363–1429)
- Nicholas of Cusa (1401–1464)

== Renaissance and early modern (born between 1450 and 1750) ==
- Thomas Cajetan, OP (1469–1534)
- Niccolò Machiavelli (1469–1527)
- Francisco de Vitoria, OP (1483–1546)
- Martin Luther (1483–1546)
- Thomas Muntzer (1490–1525)
- John Calvin (1509–1564)
- Francisco Suárez, SJ (1548–1617)
- Jean Bodin (1530–1596)
- Richard Hooker (1554–1600)
- Robert Bellarmine (1542–1621)
- Francis Bacon (1561–1626)
- Hugo Grotius (1583–1645)
- Thomas Hobbes (1588–1679)
- James Harrington (1611–1677)
- Jacques-Bénigne Bossuet (1627–1704)
- John Locke (1632–1704)
- Baruch Spinoza (1632–1677)
- George Berkeley (1685-1753)
- Montesquieu (1689–1755)
- Voltaire (1694–1778)
- Muhammad ibn Abd al-Wahhab (1703–1792)
- Benjamin Franklin (1706–1790)
- David Hume (1711–1776)
- Frederick the Great (1712–1786)
- Jean-Jacques Rousseau (1712–1778)
- Immanuel Kant (1724–1804)
- William Blackstone (1723–1780)
- Adam Smith (1723–1790)
- Edmund Burke (1729–1797)
- Thomas Paine (1737–1809)
- Thomas Jefferson (1743–1826)
- Johann Gottfried Herder (1744–1803)
- Jeremy Bentham (1748–1832)

== Late modern (born between 1750 and 1900) ==
- James Madison (1751–1836)
- Joseph de Maistre (1753–1821)
- Louis de Bonald (1754–1840)
- Alexander Hamilton (1755 or 1757–1804)
- William Godwin (1756–1836)
- Mary Wollstonecraft (1759–1797)
- Henri de Saint-Simon (1760–1825)
- Johann Gottlieb Fichte (1762–1814)
- Thomas Robert Malthus (1766–1834)
- Benjamin Constant (1767–1830)
- Georg Wilhelm Friedrich Hegel (1770–1831)
- Novalis (1772–1801)
- David Ricardo (1772–1823)
- Samuel Taylor Coleridge (1772–1834)
- Charles Fourier (1772–1837)
- James Mill (1773–1836)
- Adam Müller (1779–1829)
- Friedrich Carl von Savigny (1779–1861)
- John C. Calhoun (1782–1850)
- Félicité de La Mennais (1782–1854)
- Thomas Carlyle (1795–1881)
- Auguste Comte (1798–1857)
- John Henry Newman (1801–1890)
- Alexis de Tocqueville (1805–1859)
- Max Stirner (1806–1856)
- John Stuart Mill (1806–1873)
- Pierre-Joseph Proudhon (1809–1865)
- Matteo Liberatore, SJ (1810–1892)
- Montalembert (1810–1870)
- Mikhail Bakunin (1814–1876)
- Henry David Thoreau (1817–1862)
- Karl Marx (1818–1883)
- Sir Syed Ahmad Khan (1818–1898)
- Friedrich Engels (1820–1895)
- Herbert Spencer (1820–1903)
- Hippolyte Taine (1828–1893)
- Lord Acton (1834–1902)
- Thomas Hill Green (1836–1882)
- William Graham Sumner (1840–1910)
- Namık Kemal (1840–1888)
- Gustave Le Bon (1841–1931)
- Peter Kropotkin (1842–1921)
- Friedrich Nietzsche (1844–1900)
- Theodore de Korwin Szymanowski
- Georges Sorel (1847–1922)
- Vilfredo Pareto (1848–1923)
- Eduard Bernstein (1850–1932)
- Benjamin Tucker (1854–1939)
- Thorstein Veblen (1857–1929)
- John Dewey (1859–1952)
- Rabindranath Tagore (1861–1941)
- Swami Vivekananda (1863-1903)
- Max Weber (1864–1920)
- Sun Yat-sen (1866–1925)
- Benedetto Croce (1866–1952)
- Charles Maurras (1868–1952)
- Gandhi (1869–1948)
- Emma Goldman (1869–1940)
- Vladimir Lenin (1870–1924)
- Rosa Luxemburg (1870–1919)
- Bertrand Russell (1872–1970)
- Rudolf Rocker (1873–1958)
- Vallabhbhai Patel (1875–1950)
- Giovanni Gentile (1875–1944)
- Ziya Gökalp (1876–1924)
- Muhammad Iqbal (1877–1938)
- Martin Buber (1878–1965)
- Leon Trotsky (1879–1940)
- Oswald Spengler (1880–1936)
- Otto Bauer (1881–1938)
- Jacques Maritain (1882–1973)
- Ivan Ilyin (1883–1954)
- Georg Lukács (1885–1971)
- René Guénon (1886–1951)
- Carl Schmitt (1888–1985)
- Jawaharlal Nehru (1889–1964)
- B. R. Ambedkar (1891–1956)
- Antonio Gramsci (1891–1937)
- Walter Benjamin (1892–1940)
- Max Horkheimer (1895–1973)
- Ernst Jünger (1895–1998)
- Julius Evola (1898–1974)
- Herbert Marcuse (1898–1979)
- Wilhelm Röpke (1899–1966)
- Leo Strauss (1899–1973)
- Friedrich Hayek (1899–1992)
- Erich Fromm (1900–1980)
- Muhammad Asad (1900–1992)

== Born in 20th century ==
- Michael Oakeshott (1901–1990)
- Eric Voegelin (1901–1985)
- Karl Popper (1902–1994)
- Theodor Adorno (1903–1969)
- Ayn Rand (1905–1982)
- Raymond Aron (1905–1983)
- Jean-Paul Sartre (1905–1980)
- Hannah Arendt (1906–1975)
- Sayyid Qutb (1906–1966)
- Ruhollah Khomeini (1906–1989)
- Simone Weil (1909–1943)
- Isaiah Berlin (1909–1997)
- Erik von Kuehnelt-Leddihn (1909–1999)
- Norberto Bobbio (1909–2004)
- Albert Camus (1913–1960)
- Russell Kirk (1918–1994)
- Louis Althusser (1918–1990)
- Murray Bookchin (1921–2006)
- John Rawls (1921–2002)
- Prabhat Ranjan Sarkar (1921–1990)
- Cornelius Castoriadis (1922–1997)
- Howard Zinn (1922–2010)
- Frantz Fanon (1925–1961)
- Malcolm X (1925–1965)
- Zygmunt Bauman (1925–2017)
- Murray Rothbard (1926–1995)
- Michel Foucault (1926–1984)
- Samuel P. Huntington (1927–2008)
- Noam Chomsky (1928–)
- Jürgen Habermas (1929–2026)
- Alasdair MacIntyre (1929–2025)
- Bernard Williams (1929–2003)
- Félix Guattari (1930–1992)
- Jacques Derrida (1930–2004)
- Richard Rorty (1931–2007)
- Ronald Dworkin (1931–2013)
- Charles Taylor (1931–)
- Guy Debord (1931–1994)
- Harvey Mansfield (1932–)
- Antonio Negri (1933–2023)
- Ali Shariati (1933–1977)
- Fredric Jameson (1934–2024)
- Michael Walzer (1935–)
- Edward Said (1935–2003)
- Thomas Nagel (1937–)
- Robert Nozick (1938–2002)
- Jacques Rancière (1940–)
- Joxe Azurmendi (1941–2025)
- Robert D. Putnam (1941–)
- Gerald Cohen (1941–2009)
- Étienne Balibar (1942–)
- Roger Scruton (1944–2020)
- Roberto Mangabeira Unger (1947–)
- Javed Hashmi (1948–)
- John Gray (1948–)
- Hans-Hermann Hoppe (1949–)
- Slavoj Žižek (1949–)
- Michael Sandel (1953–)
- Włodzimierz Julian Korab-Karpowicz (1953–)
- Judith Butler (1956–)
- Michael Hardt (1960–)

== See also ==
- Lists of philosophers
