= James M. Edie =

American philosopher

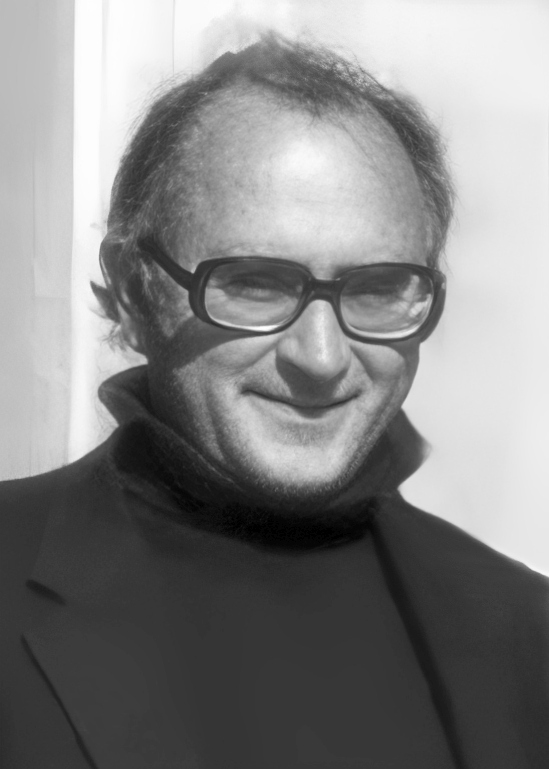
- Born: November 3, 1927; Grand Forks, North Dakota, U.S.
- Died: February 21, 1998 (aged 70); Sarasota, Florida, U.S.

Philosophical work
- Era: 20th-century philosophy
- Region: Western philosophy
- School: Continental philosophy Phenomenology
- Main interests: Contemporary continental philosophy, medieval philosophy, aesthetics, philosophy of theatre

James M. Edie (November 3, 1927 – February 21, 1998) was an American philosopher.

== Life and career ==
Edie was born in Grand Forks, North Dakota. He studied at Saint John’s University in Minnesota and at the Pontifical Atheneum of St. Anselm in Rome before obtaining his doctorate in philosophy from the Catholic University of Leuven in Belgium.

Over his career, Edie became an important figure in the publicizing and development of phenomenology in North America. He first taught philosophy for two years at Hobart and William Smith Colleges in Geneva, New York. In 1961 Edie relocated to Northwestern University in Evanston, Illinois, where he remained until his retirement, serving as Chair of the Philosophy Department from 1970 to 1977. In 1962, along with John Daniel Wild, William A. Earle, and others, he founded the Society for Phenomenology and Existential Philosophy (SPEP). and was a member of the Executive Committee of The International Association for Philosophy and Literature for five years.

Edie was fluent in at least six languages. He authored, co-authored, and edited a large corpus of academic papers and books during his career and, through his translations, introduced English readers to important works of contemporary continental philosophy. He was also the founding editor of Selected Studies in Phenomenology and Existential Philosophy.

James Edie died of cancer at his home in Sarasota, Florida.

== Quotations from Edie's works ==
=== On his philosophical interests ===
"I studied, under my professors, a good deal of Husserl and his contemporaries but especially the Logical Investigations. It became clear to me, then, that the principal foci of my philosophical interests were in questions of epistemology and the philosophy of logic, broadly conceived. I had no more interest in the mathematization of formal logic, the creation of an "artificial language," than Husserl himself, but the study of the necessary formal constraints on thinking (and all the usages of language) together with the questions these imply whether in synchronic fact or diachronic history has monopolized my attention, almost to the exclusion of other questions.

"It is said that one's self-presentation is rendered more palatable if one mentions some weaknesses. Well, though I am not as apolitical as Husserl, nor, I hope, as lacking in common sense, questions of social and political philosophy, of value theory in general, and principally theoretical ethics leave me cold. I once told a colleague, who was pressing me: if I ever write on ethical theory, it will be posthumously."

— "Self-presentation: James M. Edie", Analecta Husserliana: Vol. XXVI, pp. 208-9.

== Major works ==
=== Books (authored and edited) ===
- Christianity and Existentialism. with William Earle and John Wild. Evanston, Illinois: Northwestern University Press. 1963. 186 pages.
- Russian philosophy. Edited by James M. Edie, James P. Scanlan, and Mary-Barbara Zeldin, with the collaboration of George L. Kline. Chicago: Quadrangle Press. 1965.

- 2nd edition. Knoxville: University of Tennessee Press. 1976. ISBN 0-87049-200-4.

- An invitation to phenomenology; studies in the philosophy of experience. Edited with an introduction by James M. Edie. Chicago: Quadrangle Press. 1965. 286 pages.
- Phenomenology in America; studies in the philosophy of experience. Edited with an introduction by James M. Edie. Chicago: Quadrangle Press. 1967. 309 pages.
- New essays in phenomenology; studies in the philosophy of experience. Edited with an introduction by James M. Edie. Chicago: Quadrangle Press. 1969. 383 pages.
- Patterns of the life-world; essays in honor of John Wild. James M. Edie, Francis H. Parker, Calvin O. Schrag (eds.). Evanston, Illinois: Northwestern University Press. 1970. ISBN 978-0-8101-0311-5. 414 pages.
- Speaking and meaning: the phenomenology of language. Bloomington: Indiana University Press. 1976. ISBN 978-0-253-35425-9. 271 pages. ISBN 0-253-35425-0.
- Edmund Husserl's phenomenology: a critical commentary. Bloomington: Indiana University Press. 1987. 150 pages. ISBN 0-253-31854-8 (cloth), ISBN 0-253-20411-9 (paper).
- Merleau-Ponty's philosophy of language: structuralism and dialectics. Pittsburgh, PA / Washington, DC: Center for Advanced Research in Phenomenology / University Press of America. 1987. 104 pages. ISBN 0-8191-6636-7 (trade paper), ISBN 0-8191-6637-5 (paper).
- William James and phenomenology. Bloomington: Indiana University Press. 1987. 111 pages. ISBN 0-253-36570-8 (cloth), ISBN 0-253-20419-4 (paper).

=== Translations ===
- Thévenaz, Pierre (1962). What is phenomenology? and other essays. translated by James M. Edie, Charles Courtney, and Paul Brockelman. Chicago: Quadrangle. 191 pages.
- Merleau-Ponty, Maurice (1963). In praise of philosophy. translated by John Wild and James M. Edie. Evanston, Illinois: Northwestern University Press. 67 pages.
- Merleau-Ponty, Maurice (1964). The primacy of perception, and other essays on phenomenological psychology, the philosophy of art, history, and politics. edited and partly translated by James M. Edie. Evanston, Illinois: Northwestern University Press. 228 pages.

== See also ==
- American philosophy
- List of American philosophers
