= Louise Antony =

American philosopher

- Born: Louise M. Antony
- Spouse: Joseph Levine

Education
- Education: Syracuse University; Harvard University

Philosophical work
- Era: Contemporary philosophy
- Region: Western philosophy
- School: Analytic philosophy Analytic feminism
- Institutions: University of Massachusetts Amherst
- Main interests: Philosophy of mind Epistemology; Feminist philosophy Philosophy of language Social epistemology
- Notable ideas: Naturalized epistemology as a resource for feminist epistemology

Louise M. Antony is an American philosopher who is professor of philosophy at the University of Massachusetts Amherst. She specializes in epistemology and feminist theory.

== Education and career ==
Antony received a bachelor's in philosophy from Syracuse University in 1975, after which she went to Harvard University for her doctorate, which she received in 1981. Her first academic position was at the University of Illinois, Urbana-Champaign, in 1980-81. She taught at Boston University from 1981 to 1983; Bates College from 1983 to 1986; North Carolina State University from 1986 to 1993; the University of North Carolina, Chapel Hill from 1993 to 2000; and the Ohio State University from 2000 to 2006, when she moved to the University of Massachusetts Amherst.

== Personal life ==
Louise Antony is married to fellow philosopher Joseph Levine and is the mother of Bay Area musician Rachel Lark.

== Work ==
Antony is a proponent of analytic feminist philosophy, suggesting that earlier feminist philosophers overlooked the extent to which analytic philosophers had rejected the ideas of empiricists and rationalists, and thus misidentified analytic epistemology with empiricism.

== Publications ==
Antony has written a number of peer-reviewed papers, book reviews, and essays. She has also edited and introduced three volumes: Philosophers Without Gods (Oxford University Press, 2007), a collection of essays by leading philosophers reflecting on their life without religious faith; Chomsky and His Critics, with Norbert Hornstein (Blackwell Publishing Company, 2003); and, with Charlotte Witt, A Mind of One's Own: Feminist Essays on Reason and Objectivity (Westview Press, 1993), which was expanded in 2002 in a second edition.

Other selected essays include "Natures and Norms", "Multiple Realization: Keeping it Real", "Atheism as Perfect Piety For the Love of Reason", "Everybody Has Got It: A Defense of Non-Reductive Materialism in the Philosophy of Mind", and, with Rebecca Hanrahan, "Because I Said So: Toward a Feminist Theory of Authority".

In addition to her academic work, Antony has spoken out about the oppressive climate for women in philosophy. She wrote one of a series of articles in the New York Times's Opinionator column in the fall of 2013, and in 2011 co-founded with Ann Cudd the Mentoring Project for Junior Women in Philosophy. In 2015-16 she served as president of the eastern division of the American Philosophical Association.

== See also ==
- List of Syracuse University people
- List of Harvard University people
- List of American philosophers
