= William A. Earle =

American philosopher

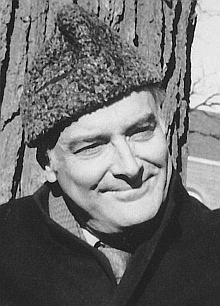
- Earle in 1974
- Born: 1919; Saginaw, Michigan
- Died: October 16, 1988 (aged 68–69); Evanston, Illinois

Philosophical work
- Era: 20th-century philosophy
- Region: Western Philosophy
- School: Existentialism, Phenomenology
- Main interests: Contemporary continental philosophy, History of ideas, Rationalism, Irrationalism, Cultural criticism, Surrealism
- Notable ideas: Singularity of each human existence, intuitive basis of knowledge

William A. Earle (1919 – October 16, 1988) was a twentieth-century American philosopher.

Earle was an important figure within the movements of existentialism and phenomenology. He had particular expertise in the thought of Karl Jaspers and Georg W. F. Hegel and was an authority on surrealism. His interests included cultural criticism, the history of ideas, aesthetics, film, filmmaking, and mysticism. Students and colleagues regarded him as a strikingly independent, richly provocative educator and thinker.

== Life ==
Earle was born in Saginaw, Michigan. After service in World War II, he studied at the University of Aix-Marseilles under Gaston Berger and at the University of Chicago under Charles Hartshorne and received PhDs from both institutions.

From 1948 to 1982 he taught philosophy at Northwestern University, with visiting lectureships at Harvard, Yale, and Stanford. In 1962 Earle, along with John Daniel Wild, James M. Edie, and others, founded the Society for Phenomenology and Existential Philosophy.

William Earle died in Evanston, Illinois.

== Philosophy ==
Earle's thought is infused with an appreciation of the singularity of human existences and with a sensibility that is both aesthetic and ethical. He wrote that he considered his books Objectivity (1955), The Autobiographical Consciousness (1972), and Mystical Reason (1980) as a continuous set of works in which one idea is examined from three successive points of view. In Objectivity he defended the objectivity of the being of the phenomenological object. In The Autobiographical Consciousness he explored the phenomenological subject, the "I" or self conceived both as an embodied existence and as transcendental. And in Mystical Reason he argued, in a "strictly philosophical" way, that the transcendental ego is identical with absolute being or God himself, proposing that there is a kind of mysticism at the core of all truly rational philosophy.

== Quotations from Earle's works ==
=== On the objective reality of the world ===
"The problem of knowledge is essentially, what does mind know? Does it know what is, or does it know only what it creates in the very act of knowing it? And the view for which I have argued is that all cognitive consciousness is an acquaintance with what is, or with reality.... The mind does not have to infer its way out of itself; it is always outside itself looking at an object.... If we must have a name for this old idea of the truth, it is perhaps an 'acquaintance' theory. When we are aware of something, we are not aware of something that 'corresponds' to something else; nor is the awareness itself a correspondence to anything. Nor is our view that of the coherence theory.... Our analysis finally is metaphysical.... The mind, in its cognitive dimension, intends Being."

— Objectivity, pp. 153-7.

=== On human nature and human life ===
"The very posing of the question 'What is man?' is itself an invitation to forget who we are."

— The Autobiographical Consciousness, p. 91.

"The laws of perception have been analysed ad nauseam; but my life is not in the least concerned with the laws of perception, but rather with what I perceive, and that remains absolutely contingent, accidental, non-deducible, and therefore surprising in principle.... Surprise also happens to be the condition of jokes, love, zest, and in effect a general synonym for life itself."

— "The Invisibility of the World", in Evanescence, p. 59.

=== On value theory and ethics ===
"It would be a mistake to divorce the general consideration of value from ontology, by isolating it in some 'value theory.' Values for me represent the way I finally want to be."

— The Autobiographical Consciousness, p. 182.

=== On literature ===
"When literature is purest, when it is not trying to do what it cannot do in any case, it never gives a scientific explanation of anything, it delivers no laws of human existence, it neither urges nor threatens us with anything.... At its best, literature simply presents or records singular human existences in their singular situations, making their absolute choices of life."

— The Autobiographical Consciousness, p. 95.

=== On God and truth ===
"The transcendental ego is... in its essence, the essential intuition of God by God. This intuition itself constituting the ego may be explicit as in the perfection of mystic experience, or implicit, down through any number of grades of consciousness."

— Mystical Reason, p. 100.

"Truth... is related to troth, which is the same as loyalty or faith. When true, I am faithful to friends and the God in them and in me.... The passion for truth which men of good will manifest is certainly not a matter of ascertaining the exact chemical composition of water or the number of grains of sand on the beach. It always was and remains a passion for recognizing and honoring the divinity in oneself and the other."

— Mystical Reason, pp. 106-7.

== Major works ==
=== Books ===
- Objectivity: An Essay in Phenomenological Ontology. New York: Noonday Press. 1955. 157 pages. Revised edition issued in 1968 by Quadrangle Press, Chicago.
- Earle, William; James M. Edie; John Wild (1963). Christianity and Existentialism. Evanston, Illinois: Northwestern University Press. 186 pages.
- The Autobiographical Consciousness: A Philosophical Inquiry into Existence. Chicago: Quadrangle Press. 1972. 235 pages. ISBN 0-8129-6164-1 (paper), ISBN 0-8129-0191-6 (cloth)
- Public Sorrows and Private Pleasures. Bloomington and London: Indiana University Press. 1976. ISBN 9780253346780. 175 pages. ISBN 0-253-34678-9
- Mystical Reason. Chicago: Regnery Gateway. 1980. 205 pages. ISBN 0-89526-677-6
- Evanescence: Peri-phenomenological Essays. Chicago: Regnery Gateway. 1984. 120 pages. ISBN 0-89526-830-2
- Imaginary Memoirs. W. Earle. 1986. (3 vols.)
- A Surrealism of the Movies. Chicago: Precedent Publishing. 1987. 173 pages. ISBN 0-913750-02-6 (paper), ISBN 0-913750-16-6 (cloth)

=== Translations ===
- Jaspers, Karl (1955). Reason and Existenz. Translated by William Earle. New York: Noonday Press.

== Secondary works ==
- Edward S. Casey; Donald V. Morano, eds. (1986). The Life of the Transcendental Ego: Essays in Honor of William Earle. Albany: State University of New York Press. 217 pages. ISBN 0-88706-170-2 (paper), ISBN 0-88706-171-0 (cloth)

== See also ==
- American philosophy
- List of American philosophers
