= John Daniel Wild =

American philosopher (1902–1972)

- Born: April 10, 1902; Chicago, Illinois
- Died: October 23, 1972 (aged 70); New Haven, Connecticut

Philosophical work
- Era: 20th-century philosophy
- Region: Western philosophy
- School: Empiricism, realism, pragmatism, existentialism, phenomenology
- Main interests: Epistemology

John Daniel Wild (April 10, 1902 – October 23, 1972) was a twentieth-century American philosopher. Wild began his philosophical career as an empiricist and realist but became an important proponent of existentialism and phenomenology in the United States.

== Life and career ==
Wild was born in Chicago, Illinois. After undergraduate studies at the University of Chicago, he received his master's degree from Harvard University and completed his PhD at the University of Chicago in 1926.

He taught for a year at the University of Michigan and then at Harvard from 1927 until 1961 when he left to assume the chairmanship of the philosophy department at Northwestern University, a leading center for phenomenology and existentialism in the United States. Wild moved to Yale in 1963 and, in 1969, to the University of Florida.

He received an honorary doctorate from Ripon College and served as visiting professor at the Universities of Chicago, Hawaii, and Washington. He served as president of the Association for Realistic Philosophy (1949) and the Metaphysical Society of America (1954). In 1962 Wild, along with William A. Earle, James M. Edie, and others, founded the Society for Phenomenology and Existential Philosophy.

John Wild died in New Haven, Connecticut.

== Major works ==
=== Books ===
- George Berkeley. Cambridge: Harvard Univ. Press. 1936. 552 pages.

- (Reissued as) George Berkeley: a study of his life and philosophy. New York: Russell & Russell. 1962.

- Plato's Theory of Man: an introduction to the realistic philosophy of culture. Cambridge: Harvard Univ. Press. 1946. 320 pages.

- (Reissued). New York: Octagon Press. 1964.

- Introduction to Realistic Philosophy. New York: Harper. 1948. 516 pages.

- (Reissued). Lanham, MD: University Press of America. 1984. ISBN 0-8191-3890-8 (paper).

- Plato's Modern Enemies and the Theory of Natural Law. Chicago: Univ. of Chicago Press. 1953. 259 pages.
- The Challenge of Existentialism. Bloomington: Indiana Univ. Press. 1955. 297 pages.

- (Reissued). Westport, CT: Greenwood Press. 1979. ISBN 0-313-21127-2.

- Human freedom and social order: an essay in Christian philosophy. Durham, NC: Duke University Press. 1959. 250 pages.
- Christianity and Existentialism. with James M. Edie and William Earle. Evanston, Illinois: Northwestern University Press. 1963. 186 pages.
- Existence and the World of Freedom. Englewood Cliffs, NJ: Prentice-Hall. 1963. 243 pages.
- The Radical Empiricism of William James. New York: Doubleday. 1969. 430 pages.

- (Reissued). Westport, CT: Greenwood Press. 1980. ISBN 0-313-22641-5.

=== Books edited ===
- Benedictus de Spinoza: selections, edited by John Wild. New York: C. Scribner’s sons. 1930. 479 pages.
- Classics of religious devotion, by John Wild and others. Boston: Beacon. 1950. 117 pages.
- The Return to Reason: Essays in Realistic Philosophy. Chicago: Henry Regnery. 1953. 373 pages.

== See also ==
- American philosophy
- List of American philosophers
