= Mircea Florian =

Mircea Florian may refer to:

- Mircea Florian (philosopher)
- Mircea Florian (musician)
