= Jessica Wilson =

Canadian metaphysician

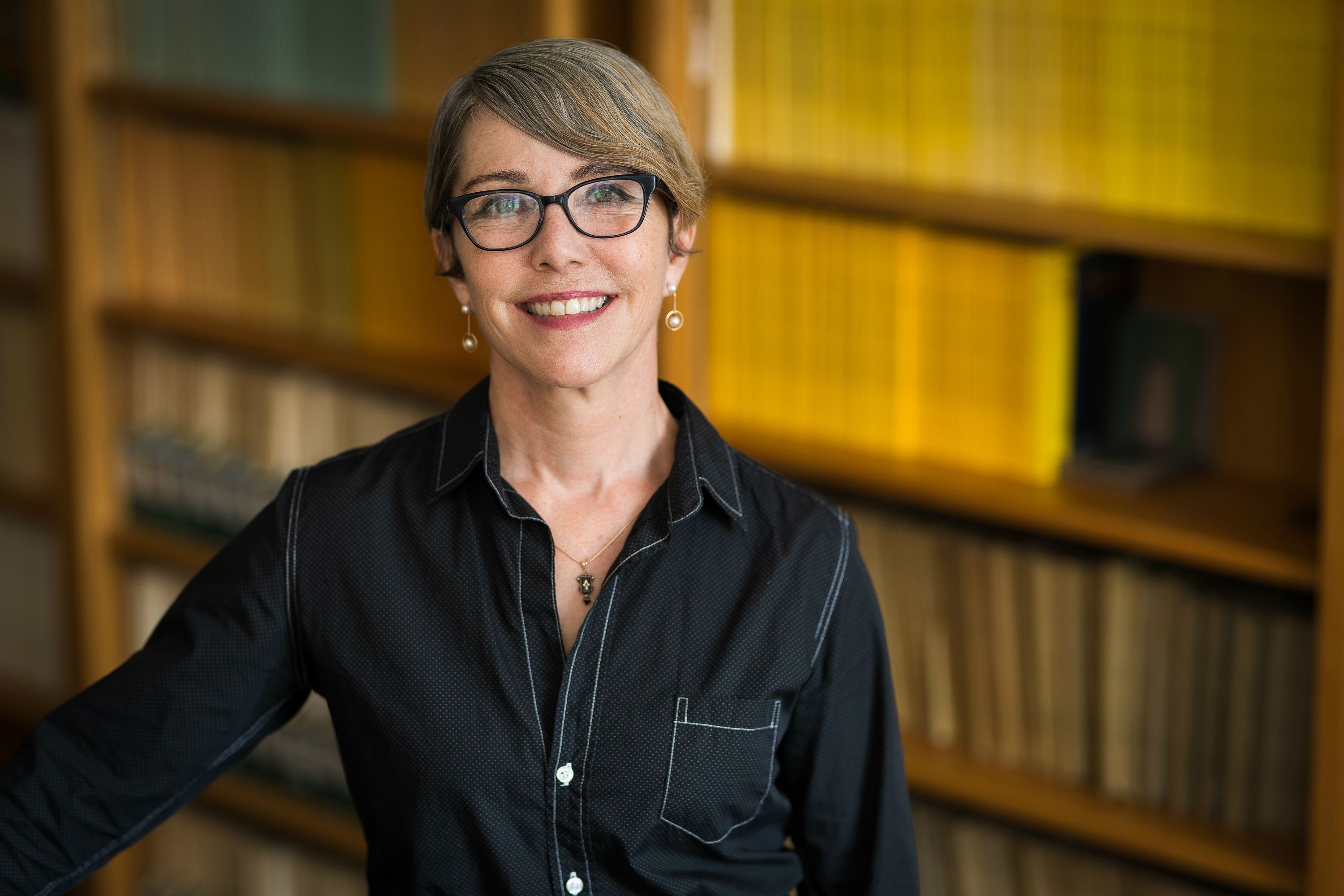
- Wilson in 2018

Philosophical work
- Era: Contemporary philosophy
- Region: Western philosophy
- School: Analytic philosophy
- Institutions: University of Toronto Scarborough
- Main interests: Metaphysics, epistemology

Jessica M. Wilson is an American professor of philosophy at the University of Toronto Scarborough. Her research focuses on metaphysics, especially on the metaphysics of science and mind, the epistemologies of skepticism, a priori deliberation, and necessity. Wilson was awarded the Lebowitz Prize for excellence in philosophical thought by Phi Beta Kappa in conjunction with the American Philosophical Association.

== Education and career ==
Wilson received her baccalaureate summa cum laude in mathematics from the University of California, San Diego in 1987, before starting a doctorate program in philosophy at the University of Colorado, Boulder in 1994, and eventually receiving her doctorate in philosophy from Cornell University in 2001. Wilson accepted an appointment as the William Wilhartz Assistant Professor of Philosophy at the University of Michigan in 2002, before moving to the University of Toronto Scarborough in 2005. In 2022, UTSC named Wilson as a Research Excellence Faculty Scholar. From 2014 to 2016, Wilson held a simultaneous appointment as a Regular Distinguished Visiting professor at the Eidyn Research Centre at the University of Edinburgh. Wilson has also held visiting positions at the Complutense University of Madrid, the National Autonomous University of Mexico, the University of Cologne, the University of St. Andrews, the University of Barcelona, Australian National University, and the Max Planck Institute for the History of Science.

== Philosophical work ==
Wilson's research has focused largely on metaphysics and epistemology, with a focus on the metaphysics of modality, fundamentality, indeterminacy, science, and mind, and the epistemologies of skepticism, a priori deliberation, and necessity, as well as physicalism, emergentism, and mental causation.

In the study of physicalism, Wilson first published on the 'proper subset strategy' for avoiding the worry that higher-level and their realizing lower-level properties would causally overdetermine their effects: properties are associated with sets of causal powers, and one property realizes another by the realized property being associated with a set of causal powers that is a proper subset of that associated with the realizing property; Wilson also argues that a nontrivial version of physicalism must be defined to exclude fundamental mental entities. Wilson's 2021 book, Metaphysical Emergence, published by Oxford University Press, was positively reviewed in Notre Dame Philosophical Reviews.

Wilson's criticism of 'Grounding', understood as a generic relation of metaphysical dependence, problematizes a notion that has recently occupied center stage in metaphysics. Wilson argues that examples of "the 'small-g' grounding relations" such as "token identity, realization, the classical extensional part-whole relation, the set membership relation, the proper subset relation, and the determinable-determinate relation" are "a heterogeneous lot" which "counts against the idea there is a distinctive coarse-grained metaphysical relation that is the unifying element concerning these relations—for what real unity do they display?"

Wilson invokes the determinable-determinate relation in the service of a novel account of metaphysical indeterminacy, in terms of an object's possessing a determinable property without possessing any unique determinate property by which that determinable might be determined. Wilson defends the superiority of the account over its competitors in various domains, including the indeterminacy of the spatial boundaries of material objects, and the indeterminacy among superposed properties postulated by quantum mechanics.
