= Joseph Levine (philosopher) =

American philosopher

- Born: 17 January 1952 (age 74); Los Angeles, California, U.S.
- Spouse: Louise Antony

Education
- Education: University of California, Los Angeles (BA); Harvard University (PhD)

Philosophical work
- Era: Contemporary philosophy
- Region: Western philosophy
- School: Analytic philosophy
- Institutions: Bates College; Boston University; North Carolina State University; Ohio State University; University of Illinois Urbana-Champaign; University of Massachusetts Amherst
- Main interests: Philosophy of mind Consciousness; Philosophy of language Metaphysics
- Notable ideas: Explanatory gap

Joseph Levine (born January 17, 1952) is an American philosopher at the University of Massachusetts Amherst who received his PhD from Harvard University in 1981. He works on philosophy of mind and is best known for formulating the explanatory gap argument against materialist explanations for consciousness. This has been cited as a precursor to David Chalmers's formulation of the hard problem of consciousness. Levine is also the author of several popular and academic philosophy books and articles.

== Philosophical work ==
Levine writes on the philosophy of mind and is best known for formulating the explanatory gap argument against materialist explanations for consciousness. This has been cited as a precursor to David Chalmers's formulation of the hard problem of consciousness, and as one of the main objections materialist theories in the philosophy of mind must address. The idea of the explanatory gap is that an unbridgeable gap exists when trying to comprehend consciousness from the perspective of natural science, as a scientific explanation of mental states would require a reduction from a physical process to phenomenal experience. The property of mental states to be experienced from a subjective point of view (qualia) might not be reducible from the objective, i.e. outside, perspective of science. In this sense, there would be a gap between the outside perspective of science and the internal perspective of phenomenal experience. Levine does not believe this gap necessitates a metaphysical conclusion; that is, he does not believe his argument refutes materialism. But he believes it poses a unique epistemic problem:

While I think this materialist response is right in the end, it does not suffice to put the mind-body problem to rest. Even if conceivability considerations do not establish that the mind is in fact distinct from the body, or that mental properties are metaphysically irreducible to physical properties, still they do demonstrate that we lack an explanation of the mental in terms of the physical.

Levine is the author of popular and academic philosophy books and articles.

== Personal life ==
Levine is married to philosopher Louise Antony. They have two children, including Bay Area musician Rachel Lark.

== See also ==
- Thomas Nagel
- John Searle
- Frank Jackson
- Colin McGinn

== Links ==
- Homepage of Joseph Levine, University of Massachusetts, Amherst, with bibliography
