= Susanna Schellenberg =

American philosopher

Philosophical work
- Institutions: Rutgers University, Australian National University
- Main interests: epistemology, philosophy of mind, perception, philosophy of language,

Susanna Schellenberg is Distinguished Professor of Philosophy and Cognitive Science at Rutgers University, where she holds a secondary appointment at the Rutgers Center for Cognitive Science. She specializes in epistemology, philosophy of mind, and philosophy of language and is best known for her work on perceptual experience, evidence, capacities, mental content, and imagination. She is the recipient of numerous awards, including a Guggenheim Award, a Humboldt Prize, and a Mellon New Directions Fellowship for a project on the Neuroscience of Perception. She is the author of The Unity of Perception: Content, Consciousness, Evidence (Oxford University Press, 2018). The book won an honorable mention for the American Philosophical Association 2019 Sanders Book Prize.

== Education and employment ==
Schellenberg was born in Beirut, Lebanon, and raised in Lebanon, Pakistan, and Switzerland. After having received a mathematical-scientific Matura (Typus C) from the Gymnasium Köniz-Lebermatt, Switzerland, she studied mathematics, economics, philosophy, and history at the Universität Basel, Université Paris I Panthéone-Sorbonne, Johann-Wolfgang Goethe Universität, and Oxford University. She received a doctorate in philosophy from the University of Pittsburgh in 2007, where her thesis dealt with conceptual content and inference.

Schellenberg held a Mellon postdoctoral fellowship at the University of Toronto from 2006 to 2008 which was curtailed when she chose to move to a postdoctoral position at the Australian National University, where she subsequently became an assistant professor in 2008, and an associate professor in 2010. Schellenberg was the first woman to hold a permanent academic appointment in Philosophy at the Australia National University's Research School of Social Sciences. In 2011, Schellenberg moved to Rutgers University. Brian Weatherson and Jonathan L. Kvanvig regarded Schellenberg's move to Rutgers as buttressing Rutgers' reputation as having one of the pre-eminent epistemology departments in the world.

== Research areas ==
Schellenberg's work has centered around developing a comprehensive account of the epistemological and phenomenological role of perception. Her view shows how the epistemic force of experience is grounded in employing perceptual capacities that we possess by virtue of being perceivers Schellenberg has also developed an account of the nature of perceptual content that suggests a new way to understand singular modes of presentation, arguing that perceptual experience is at root both relational and representational. In addition to her main areas of interest, Schellenberg has also written papers on topics such as inferential semantics, the philosophy of Gottlob Frege, and imagination. Much of Schellenberg's work to-date has focused on reconciling apparently contradictory viewpoints on topics in the philosophy of mind.

== Publications ==
Schellenberg is the author of The Unity of Perception: Content, Consciousness, Evidence (OUP, 2018) and has published a series of articles in leading journals such as The Journal of Philosophy, Mind, Noûs, and Philosophy and Phenomenological Research.
