= Susanna Siegel =

American philosopher

- Born: Susanna Claire Siegel

Education
- Education: Swarthmore College (BA); Yale University (MA); Cornell University (MA, PhD)
- Thesis: Perception and Demonstrative Reference (2000)
- Doctoral advisor: Sydney Shoemaker

Philosophical work
- Era: Contemporary philosophy
- Region: Western philosophy
- School: Analytic philosophy
- Institutions: Harvard University, University of Oslo, University of Birmingham, École normale supérieure
- Main interests: Philosophy of mind, epistemology, philosophy of perception, philosophy of language
- Notable ideas: Cognitive penetrability Expertise-induced changes in perceptual consciousness Method of phenomenal contrast Limited intentionism

Susanna Claire Siegel is an American philosopher. She is the Edgar Pierce Professor of Philosophy at Harvard University and well known for her work in the philosophy of mind and epistemology, especially on perception.

== Education and career ==
Siegel received her B.A. in philosophy from Swarthmore College in 1991, before going on to receive an M.A. in philosophy from Yale University in 1993, an M.A. degree in philosophy from Cornell University in 1996, and a PhD in philosophy (under Sydney Shoemaker) from Cornell in 2000.

From 1999 to 2004, Siegel served as assistant professor of philosophy at Harvard University, receiving a secondary appointment as the John L. Loeb Associate Professor of the Humanities before being promoted to full professor in 2005. In 2011, she was appointed the Edgar Pierce Professor of Philosophy, previously held by B. F. Skinner, Willard van Orman Quine, and Charles Parsons

In 2011, she was a Walter Channing Cabot Fellow. She has held visiting appointments at the University of Birmingham, where she was a Distinguished Visiting Researcher from 2014 to 2017, and the University of Oslo, where she holds a part-time appointment as a visiting researcher. She has also given the Gareth Evans Memorial Lecture at Oxford University, The Tamara Horowitz Memorial Lecture at the University of Pittsburgh, and the Burman Lectures at the University of Umeå, Sweden. In 2023, she was elected a Fellow of the American Academy of Arts & Sciences.

== Philosophical work ==
Siegel is best known for her work in the philosophy of perception and epistemology. Her work is discussed critically and has influenced many subsequent discussions of the contents of experience.

She has authored a monograph, The Contents of Visual Experience, and has edited an anthology, The Elements of Philosophy: Readings from Past and Present, in addition to publishing a number of chapters and peer-reviewed journal articles. She is also author of Stanford Encyclopedia of Philosophy's article The Contents of Perception. Her monograph was well received, and her papers have been widely cited.

Ned Block described Siegel's The Contents of Visual Experience as "one of the most significant books in philosophy of mind for many years." James Genone hailed The Contents of Visual Experience as "an important contribution to the contemporary literature on the nature and structure of perception," and lauded Siegel for being one of the first recent philosophers to challenge the prevailing view that perceptual experiences have representational contents, suggesting that if Siegel is correct in her views, the result would be a sea change that would effect not only the philosophy of perceptual experiences, but also have broad implications for many other areas of philosophy.

The early portion of Siegel's book defends two related views, one that she deems the "Content View," and one that she describes as the "Rich Content View." The "Content View" represents a situation in which there is precision in the way in which perceptual experiences have meaningful contents, whereas in the "Rich Content View" perceptual experiences consist of simple and complex properties that humans extrapolate meaning from. Having established this framework, Siegel uses it to examine three major philosophical points: first, that humans are able to determine content from sensory cues (in what Siegel describes as "the method of phenomenal contrast"); second, that the method of phenomenal contrast supports the idea of the Rich Content model as an enhancement over the Content model; and lastly, that while ordinary visual experiences involve seeing things that pertain to objects in addition to seeing things that do not pertain to objects, hallucinations differ from standard visual experiences by only perceiving things that do not pertain to particular objects.

In a series of articles, and a monograph titled The Rationality of Perception (2017), Siegel argues that we can epistemically evaluate the subpersonal transitions that lead to a perceptual experience, just as we rationally evaluate the transitions that lead to an individual forming a belief. So-called "ill-founded" influences or transitions can diminish the epistemic value of the resulting experience. This upends the traditional philosophical emphasis on perceptual experience as epistemically foundational, capable of justifying beliefs without itself being susceptible to epistemic evaluation in terms of rationality.
