= Lynne Rudder Baker =

American philosopher (1944–2017)

- Born: February 14, 1944; Atlanta, Georgia, U.S.
- Died: December 24, 2017 (aged 73); Amherst, Massachusetts, U.S.
- Spouse: Tom Baker

Education
- Education: Vanderbilt University

Lynne Rudder Baker (February 14, 1944 – December 24, 2017) was an American philosopher and author. At the time of her death she was a distinguished professor at the University of Massachusetts Amherst (UMass Amherst).

== Biography ==
Born in Atlanta, Georgia in 1944 to Virginia Bennett and James Rudder, she earned her Ph.D. in 1972 from Vanderbilt University after beginning her graduate studies at Johns Hopkins University in 1967. She was a fellow of the National Humanities Center (1983–1984) and the Woodrow Wilson International Center for Scholars (1988–1989).

She joined the faculty of UMass Amherst in 1989. She is the author of several books, notably Saving Belief: A Critique of Physicalism (1987), Explaining Attitudes: A Practical Approach to the Mind (1995), Persons and Bodies: A Constitution View (2000), and The Metaphysics of Everyday Life: An Essay in Practical Realism (2007).

Along with several other scholars, Baker delivered the 2001 Gifford Lectures in Natural Theology at the University of Glasgow, published as The Nature and Limits of Human Understanding (ed. Anthony Sanford, T & T Clark, 2003). She was a member of the Amherst Grace Episcopal Church. Baker died of heart disease on December 24, 2017, in Amherst, Massachusetts, aged 73.

== See also ==
- Social ontology
