= Christianity and pandeism =

A number of Christian writers have examined the concept of pandeism (a belief that God created and then became the universe and ceased to exist as a separate and conscious entity), and these have generally found it to be inconsistent with core principles of Christianity. The Roman Catholic Church, for example, condemned the Periphyseon of John Scotus Eriugena, later identified by physicist and philosopher Max Bernhard Weinstein as presenting a pandeistic theology, as appearing to obscure the separation of God and creation. The Church similarly condemned elements of the thought of Giordano Bruno which Weinstein and others determined to be pandeistic.

== From ancient times to the Enlightenment ==
=== Eriugena ===
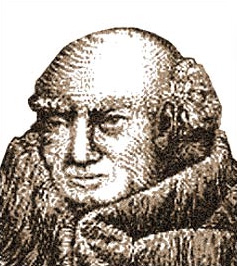
Johannes Scotus Eriugena

The philosophy of 9th century theologian Johannes Scotus Eriugena, who proposed that "God has created the world out of his own being", has been identified by various theologians as a form of pandeism. Max Bernhard Weinstein notes that Eriugena's vision of God was one which does not know what it is, and learns this through the process of existing as its creation. In his magnum opus, De divisione naturae (also called Periphyseon, probably completed around 867 AD), Eriugena viewed creation as the self-manifestation of God. "God knows that He is, but not what He is. God has existential knowledge, but no circumscribing knowledge of His essence, since, as infinite, He is uncircumscribable." According to Dermot Moran, "Eriugena's cosmological account has been criticized for collapsing the differences between God and creation, leading to a heresy later labeled as pantheism."

Eriugena himself denied explicitly that he was a pantheist. "God is all in all. All things that are in God, even are God, are eternal...the creature subsists in God, and God is created in the creature in a wonderful and ineffable way, making himself manifest, invisible making himself visible...But the divine nature, he finally insists, because it is above being, is different from what it create within itself." The system of thought outlined is a combination of neo-Platonic mysticism, emanationism, and pantheism which Eriugena strove in vain to reconcile with Aristotelian empiricism, Christian creationism, and theism. "The result is a body of doctrines loosely articulated, in which the mystic and idealistic elements predominate, and in which there is much that is irreconcilable with Catholic dogma." De divisione naturae was condemned by a council at Sens by Honorius III (1225), for promoting the identity of God and creation.

Weinstein also found that thirteenth century scholastic theologian and philosopher Bonaventure, who accepted the neo-Platonic doctrine that "forms" do not exist as subsistent entities, but as ideals or archetypes in the mind of God, according to which actual things were formed, showed strong pandeistic inclinations. Of Papal legate Nicholas of Cusa, who wrote of the enfolding of creation in God and the unfolding of the divine human mind in creation, Weinstein wrote that he was, to a certain extent, a pandeist.

=== Giordano Bruno ===
Weinstein found that pandeism was strongly expressed in the teachings of Giordano Bruno, who envisioned a deity which had no particular relation to one part of the infinite universe more than any other, and was immanent, as present on Earth as in the Heavens, subsuming in itself the multiplicity of existence. Lutheran theologian Otto Kirn criticized as overbroad Weinstein's assertions that figures including Eriugena, Anselm of Canterbury, Nicholas of Cusa, Bruno, and Mendelssohn all were pandeists or leaned towards pandeism. Weinstein was not alone in considering Bruno a pandeist. Discover editor Corey S. Powell wrote that Bruno's cosmology was "a tool for advancing an animist or Pandeist theology," and this position was agreed with by science writer Michael Newton Keas, and The Daily Beast writer David Sessions. Tariq Goddard wrote that "Bruno was not quite an atheist or pantheist. He most likely followed an apophatic creed (via negativa), making him more of a pandeist."

The Venetian Inquisition had Bruno arrested on 22 May 1592. Among the numerous charges of blasphemy and heresy brought against him in Venice, based on Mocenigo's denunciation, was his belief in the plurality of worlds, as well as accusations of personal misconduct. The Roman Inquisition, asked for his transfer to Rome, where he was sent in February 1593. The numerous charges against Bruno, based on some of his books as well as on witness accounts, included blasphemy, immoral conduct, and heresy in matters of dogmatic theology, and involved some of the basic doctrines of his philosophy and cosmology. Luigi Firpo speculates the charges made against Bruno by the Roman Inquisition were: holding opinions contrary to the Catholic faith and speaking against it and its ministers; holding opinions contrary to the Catholic faith about the Trinity, divinity of Christ, and Incarnation; the virginity of Mary, mother of Jesus; about both Transubstantiation and Mass; claiming the Eternity of the world; believing in metempsychosis and in the transmigration of the human soul into brutes; and dealing in magics and divination.

On 20 January 1600, Pope Clement VIII declared Bruno a heretic and the Inquisition issued a sentence of death. He was turned over to the secular authorities. On Ash Wednesday, 17 February 1600, in the Campo de' Fiori (a central Roman market square), and burned at the stake. All of Bruno's works were placed on the Index Librorum Prohibitorum in 1603. After a seven year trial there, he was put to death. The Cambridge Companion to Joseph Ratzinger notes that Joseph Ratzinger, who would later become Pope, was in particular "critical of… [Bruno's] pandeism".

== Post-Enlightenment developments ==
=== In the 1800s ===
In the 1820s to 1830s, pandeism received some mention in Italy. In 1832 and 1834, publishers Angelo Ajani and Giovanni Silvestri, respectively, each posthumously published volumes of sermons of Italian Padre Filippo Nannetti di Bibulano (aka il Filippo Nani, Padre da Lojano; 1759–1829), who named pandeism as being among beliefs he condemned, railing against "Jews, Muslims, Gentiles, Schismatics, Heretics, Pandeists, Deists, and troubled, restless spirits." Nannetti further specifically criticized pandeism, declaring, "To you, fatal Pandeist! the laws that create nature are contingent and mutable, not another being in substance with forces driven by motions and developments." In 1838, another Catholic Italian, phrenologist Luigi Ferrarese in Memorie Riguardanti la Dottrina Frenologica ("Thoughts Regarding the Doctrine of Phrenology") critically described Victor Cousin's philosophy as a doctrine which "locates reason outside the human person, declaring man a fragment of God, introducing a sort of spiritual pandeism, absurd for us, and injurious to the Supreme Being."

Towards the end of the century, in 1897, Reverend Henry Grattan Guinness wrote critically that in India, "God is everything, and everything is God, and, therefore, everything may be adored. ... Her pan-deism is a pandemonium."

=== Twentieth century on ===
A 1906 editorial by a Unitarian minister in the Chattanooga Daily Times stated that Jesus, "who in exultant faith said 'I and the Father are one,' was a Pandeist, a believer in the identification of the universe and all things contained therein with Deity."

Christian reconstructionist Rousas John Rushdoony sharply criticized the Catholic Church in his 1971 The One and the Many: Studies in the Philosophy of Order and Ultimacy, asserting, “The position of Pope Paul came close to being a pan-Deism, and pan-Deism is the logical development of the virus of Hellenic thought." Adventist theologian Bert B. Beach wrote in 1974 that "during the Vatican Council there was criticism from WCC Circles" to the effect that "ecumenism was being contaminated by “pan-Deist” and syncretistic tendencies."

In 1996, Pastor Bob Burridge of the Genevan Institute for Reformed Studies wrote in his Survey Studies in Reformed Theology an essay on "The Decrees of God," also identifying the notion of God becoming the universe as incompatible with Christianity, writing, "All the actions of created intelligences are not merely the actions of God. He has created a universe of beings which are said to act freely and responsibly as the proximate causes of their own moral actions. When individuals do evil things it is not God the Creator and Preserver acting. If God was the proximate cause of every act it would make all events to be "God in motion". That is nothing less than pantheism, or more exactly, pandeism."

Burridge disagreed that such is the case, decrying that "The Creator is distinct from his creation. The reality of secondary causes is what separates Christian theism from pandeism." Burridge concludes by challenging his reader to determine why "calling God the author of sin demand[s] a pandeistic understanding of the universe effectively removing the reality of sin and moral law."

Ronny Miron, writing of Alan M. Olson's explanation of the views of Karl Jaspers, noted his opinion that "the fear that pandeism or the tendency to reduce faith into the external means by which it is obtained would eventually lead to the viewing of these means as having purely subjective, and also mutable, validity, was behind the Catholic church's emphasis on the objective truth of the symbols themselves in relation to the individual religious experience".

Christian apologist John Oakes has described pandeism as an "ad hoc and a weak marriage" of pantheism and deism. English theologian and Anglican priest, Graham Ward, insists that "Attention to Christ and the Spirit delivers us from pantheism, pandeism, and process theology," Consistent with a broader Catholic rejection of the New Age movement, in 2013, Catholic author Al Kresta observes that: "New Age" cosmologies reject materialism, naturalism and physicalism. They are commonly pantheistic or pandeistic. They frequently try to commandeer quantum physics and consciousness studies to illustrate their conception of the cosmos." In 2022 minister Brent Price described pandeism as "a very contemporary deceptive religious concept that targets uninformed and unsaved people," explaining his view that "this false religious view is why many have come to believe that God, the Creator of the universe, no longer exists, because He became the universe and is now the universe."

== See also ==
- Catholic Church and deism
- Criticism of pandeism
