= Criticism of pandeism =

Pandeism has been criticized in various ways by proponents of other theological models, particularly of atheism and theism. Proponents of pandeism have themselves published collections containing criticism from various viewpoints, including those written from Christian, Jewish, Islamic, New Thought, and Atheist perspectives, as part of efforts to increase awareness and debate regarding Pandeism. At times, ideological foes have accused political and religious figures of secretly being pandeists, as a means of casting aspersions on those accused.

== Theology ==
=== Enlightenment Era opposition ===
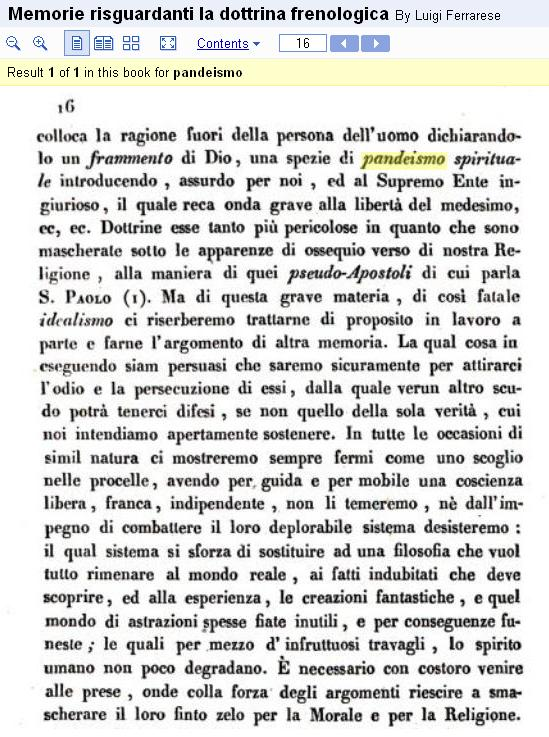
One of the earliest uses of Pandeism, describing it as "absurd for us, and injurious to the Supreme Being."

Early 19th century criticism of pandeism arose in Italy. In 1834, publisher Giovanni Silvestri posthumously published a volume of sermons of Italian Padre Filippo Nannetti di Bibulano (aka il Filippo Nani, Padre da Lojano; 1759–1829), who named pandeism as being among beliefs he condemned, railing against "Jews, Muslims, Gentiles, Schismatics, Heretics, Pandeists, Deists, and troubled, restless spirits." Nannetti further specifically criticized pandeism, declaring, "To you, fatal Pandeist! the laws that create nature are contingent and mutable, not another being in substance with forces driven by motions and developments." In 1838, another Italian, phrenologist Luigi Ferrarese in Memorie Riguardanti la Dottrina Frenologica ("Thoughts Regarding the Doctrine of Phrenology") critically described Victor Cousin's philosophy as a doctrine which "locates reason outside the human person, declaring man a fragment of God, introducing a sort of spiritual pandeism, absurd for us, and injurious to the Supreme Being."

Criticism of pandeism was expressed later in the century by White colonists in India, in their writings about that subcontinent. A February 1877 article titled "Native Honesty" published in The Bengal Times, criticizing certain White colonists for treating Indian people as equals and entrusting them with civic responsibilities, stated: "We must tell them and their disciples plainly that their professed love of the Native is a hollow sham. Their white-pandeism is merely a speculation to secure patronage". That same year, Peruvian scholar and historian Carlos Wiesse Portocarrero had written in an essay titled Philosophical Systems of India that in that country, "Metaphysics is pandeistic and degenerates into idealism". Nearly two decades later, in 1896, another Italian, historian Gustavo Uzielli, described the world's population as influenced "by a superhuman idealism in Christianity, by an anti-human nihilism in Buddhism, and by an incipient but growing pandeism in Indian Brahmanism." The following year, in 1897, Reverend Henry Grattan Guinness wrote critically that in India, "God is everything, and everything is God, and, therefore, everything may be adored. ... Her pan-deism is a pandemonium."

=== Post-enlightenment opposition ===
Later opposition to Pandeism has come both from theistic and atheistic or nontheistic directions.

==== Theistic criticism ====
Judaism author Roger Price has faulted Pandeism's lack of community, claiming "Pandeism seems to exist in a social vacuum," with "no religious literature, no prayers, no rites, no rituals, no codes of conduct, no holidays, and no requirements or even opportunities for adherents to come together in common purpose broader than discussing theological niceties." A review of the key modern text, Pandeism: An Anthology, in the magazine Paradigm Explorer observes that "apart from one reference, love is conspicuous by its absence, and experience of the divine as love is the basis of mystical theism."

Italian theologian Giordano Bruno, whose views have been identified by many as expressing a form of pandeism, was arrested in 1592 on charges of blasphemy and heresy In 1600, Pope Clement VIII declared Bruno a heretic and the Inquisition issued a sentence of death, after which Bruno was burned at the stake. All of Bruno's works were placed on the Index Librorum Prohibitorum in 1603. More than 400 years later, the Cambridge Companion to Joseph Ratzinger noted that Joseph Ratzinger, who would later become Pope, was in particular "critical of… [Bruno's] pandeism".

Christian apologist John Oakes has described pandeism as an "ad hoc and a weak marriage" of pantheism and deism. In 1996, Pastor Bob Burridge of the Genevan Institute for Reformed Studies wrote in his Survey Studies in Reformed Theology an essay on "The Decrees of God," also identifying the notion of God becoming the universe as incompatible with Christianity:

All the actions of created intelligences are not merely the actions of God. He has created a universe of beings which are said to act freely and responsibly as the proximate causes of their own moral actions. When individuals do evil things it is not God the Creator and Preserver acting. If God was the proximate cause of every act it would make all events to be "God in motion". That is nothing less than pantheism, or more exactly, pandeism.

Burridge disagrees that such is the case, decrying that "The Creator is distinct from his creation. The reality of secondary causes is what separates Christian theism from pandeism." Burridge concludes by challenging his reader to determine why "calling God the author of sin demand[s] a pandeistic understanding of the universe effectively removing the reality of sin and moral law."

A 2018 newspaper piece by Pastor Adriene Greene framed pandeism as being a product of "confused minds," and that "Pandeism congealed in the 18th century then naturally ran into a brick wall of unanswered questions," and is modernly in vogue due to political correctness. The same newspaper then published a response from an advocare of pandeism. In 2022 minister Brent Price described pandeism as "a very contemporary deceptive religious concept that targets uninformed and unsaved people," explaining his view that "this false religious view is why many have come to believe that God, the Creator of the universe, no longer exists, because He became the universe and is now the universe."

In Islam, a criticism is raised, wherein it is argued that "from the juristic standpoint, obliterating the distinctions between God and the universe necessarily entails that in effect there can be no Sharia, since the deontic nature of the Law presupposes the existence of someone who commands (amir) and others who are the recipients of the command (ma'mur), namely God and his subjects."

==== Nontheistic criticism ====
Some theologians have specifically criticised the pandeistic notion of a Creator wholly becoming the universe. An example is William Walker Atkinson, in his 1911 Mastery of Being:

It will be seen that this fact of the Immutability of REALITY, when clearly conceived, must serve to confute and refute the erroneous theories of certain schools of Pantheism which hold that "God becomes the Universe by changing into the Universe." Thus it is sought to identify Nature with God, whereby, as Schopenhauer said, "you show God to the door." If God changes Himself into The Phenomenal Universe, then God is non-existent and we need not concern ourselves any more about Him, for he has committed suicide by Change.

Atkinson's passage to this effect has been identified as a criticism of Pandeism. He claims that if God were evolving or improving, being an infinite being, it would have to be traceable back to some point of having "an infinitely undeveloped state and condition." But, this claim was made prior to the rise of scientific knowledge pinpointing the beginning of the universe in time, and connecting time with space, so that time would not exist as we know it prior to the universe existing.

In Pandeism: An Anthology, atheist Dan Dana criticizes Pandeism as simply unnecessary, despite acknowledging that it has fewer drawbacks than other theological models.

== As an accusation ==
On several occasions, theological and ideological opponents of prominent persons or movements have accused them of being Pandeists, as with the example above of Ferrarese describing the philosophy of Victor Cousin, in negative terms, as a form of Pandeism. Calvinist theologian Rousas John Rushdoony sharply criticized the Catholic Church in his 1971 The One and the Many: Studies in the Philosophy of Order and Ultimacy, writing, "The position of Pope Paul came close to being a pan-Deism, and pan-Deism is the logical development of the virus of Hellenic thought," and further that "a sincere idealist, implicitly pan-Deist in faith, deeply concerned with the problems of the world and of time, can be a Ghibelline pope, and Dante's Ghibellines have at last triumphed." Adventist theologian Bert B. Beach wrote in 1974 that "during the Vatican Council there was criticism from WCC Circles" to the effect that "ecumenism was being contaminated by "pan-Deist" and syncretistic tendencies."

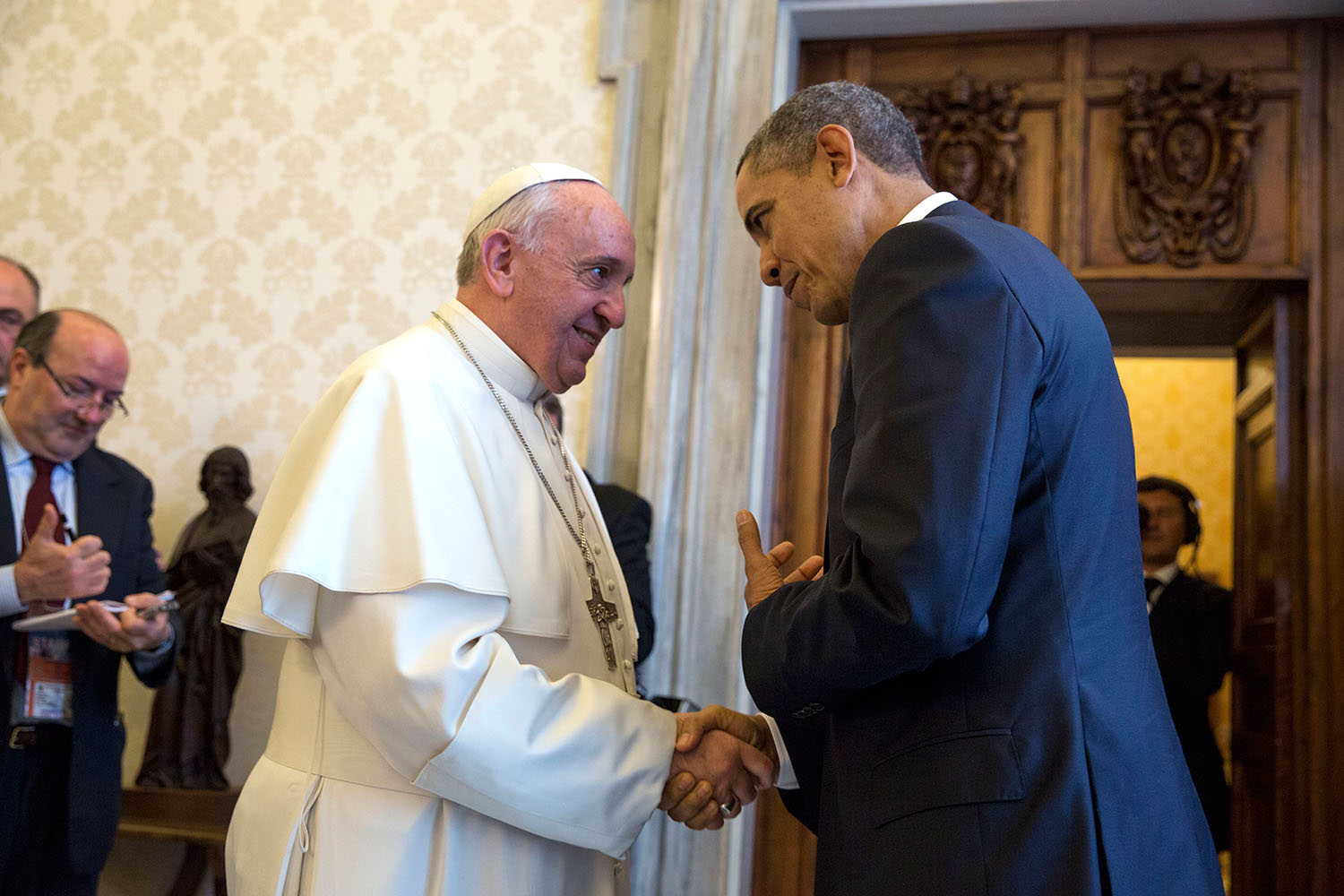
Barack Obama and Pope Francis are two people who have been accused by ideological foes of secretly being Pandeists.

During the 2008 United States presidential election, psychologist Alan J. Lipman wrote a fictitious parody account of a "Dr. Negative" grouping pandeism together with concepts such as drug use, adultery, Cubism, and miscegenation as things candidate John McCain could accuse political opponent Barack Obama of. The following year, conservative blogger Mark Finkelstein in fact labeled Obama, along with Al Gore, and New York Times columnist Gail Collins as Pandeists, in a piece titled "Happy Pan-Deism Day From Gail Collins". Collins having noted the coincidence of Easter and Passover falling in the same week, wrote that "Americans with less religious inclinations can look forward to the upcoming Earth Day celebrations, when the president is planning to do something as yet unannounced, but undoubtedly special, and Arbor Day, when rumor has it that he will not just plant a tree, but personally reforest a large swath of the nation of Mali". Finkelstein retorted that:

Environmentalism has essentially become a religion, and Earth Day effectively a religious holiday. Yesterday's pan-deists, who worshiped trees and brooks, have become members of various environmental groups doing much the same thing. People like Al Gore others, and perhaps the reforesting Obama, have become their latter day shamans.

Pope Francis, as well, has been called by opponents of his papacy, "a pandeist who does not believe in the transcendent God and Creator of Catholicism, but in the immanent 'divine principle' of Paganism, the life giving world soul (anima mundi) within the Universe", described as a creed "remarkably like a synthesis of the belief systems of Lord Shaftsbury (sic), Friedrich Schleiermacher, Benedict Spinoza, Auguste Compte, and Pierre Teilhard de Chardin."

== See also ==
- Christianity and Pandeism
