= Karl Jaspers Society of North America =

Philosophical organization in the United States

The Karl Jaspers Society of North America (KJSNA) is a philosophy organization founded on December 28, 1980 by George B. Pepper (Iona College), Edith Ehrlich, and Leonard H. Ehrlich (University of Massachusetts Amherst) to promote study and research on the ideas of Karl Jaspers and related issues in continental philosophy. The prospect of forming this society emerged from the research by these scholars while preparing a systematic reader of the basic philosophical writings of Karl Jaspers. Enthusiastic response to the reader prompted Pepper and Ehrlich to conclude that a learned society to study the work of Jaspers should be founded. The Karl Jaspers Society of North America is tax exempt under the U.S. Internal Revenue Code as a nonprofit organization.

== Annual Meetings ==
Since 1980 the Karl Jaspers Society of North America (KJSNA) has conducted its annual meetings with the American Philosophical Association (APA) and occasionally with the Society for Phenomenology and Existential Philosophy (SPEP). Selected papers of KJSNA meetings are published, since 2005, in the Open Source on-line journal Existenz, co-edited by Alan M. Olson (Boston University) and Helmut Wautischer (California State University at Sonoma) from 2006-2015. Since 2016 Helmut Wautischer is the journal's Editor-in-Chief. Research and writing presented at the annual meetings of KJSNA is automatically being considered for publication, although Existenz also welcomes unsolicited related materials in philosophy, religion, politics, and the arts. The 30th Anniversary of KJSNA is celebrated in a collection of essays co-edited by Helmut Wautischer, Alan M. Olson, and Gregory J. Walters entitled, Philosophical Faith and the Future of Humanity,(Springer Verlag, 2011).

== International Karl Jaspers Meetings ==
The Society (KJSNA) has played a leading role in the organization of international meetings of Jaspers societies at venues of the World Congress of Philosophy, in cooperation with the Karl Jaspers Stiftung of Basel, the Jaspers Society of Japan, the Österreichische Karl-Jaspers-Gesellschaft, and the Jaspers Society of Poland. The first international meeting was held in Montreal 1983 at the XVII World Congress of Philosophy. Subsequent meetings have been held at the XVIII World Congress of Philosophy in Brighton, England (1988); the XIX World Congress of Philosophy in Moscow (1993); the XX World Congress of Philosophy in Boston (1998); the XXI World Congress of Philosophy in Istanbul (2003); the XXII World Congress of Philosophy in Seoul, South Korea (2008); and the XXIII World Congress of Philosophy in Athens, Greece (2013). In 2018, KJSNA was the official organizer of the Eight International Jaspers Conference in conjunction with the XXIV. World Congress of Philosophy in Beijing, China. The ninth international meeting (theme: "Jaspersian Boundary Situations") took place in Rome during the 25th World Congress of Philosophy (2024).

The proceedings of the meetings of the International Association of Karl Jaspers Societies listed above have been published under the following titles:

- Karl Jaspers Today: Philosophy at the Threshold of the Future (ISBN 0-8191-7014-3)
- Karl Jaspers: Philosopher Among Philosophers (ISBN 3-88479-848-0)
- Karl Jaspers: On the Way to World Philosophy (ISBN 3-8260-1564-9)
- Karl Jaspers’ Philosophy: Rooted in the Present, Paradigm for the Future (ISBN 3-8260-2601-2)
- Karl Jaspers: Historic Actuality in View of the Fundamental Problems of Mankind (ISBN 978-382603938-6)
- Cross-Cultural Conflicts and Communication: Rethinking Jaspers' Philosophy Today (ISBN 978-382605214-9)
- For the 2018 conference, selected papers are included in subsequent issues of Existenz, starting with Volume 13, No.1, Spring 2018.
- Selected papers of the 2024 conference are planned for the 2024 issues of Existenz (vol. 19).
