= Seventh-day Adventist Church in Poland =

Protestant religious organization in Poland

- Kościół Adwentystów Dnia Siódmego w Rzeczypospolitej Polskiej
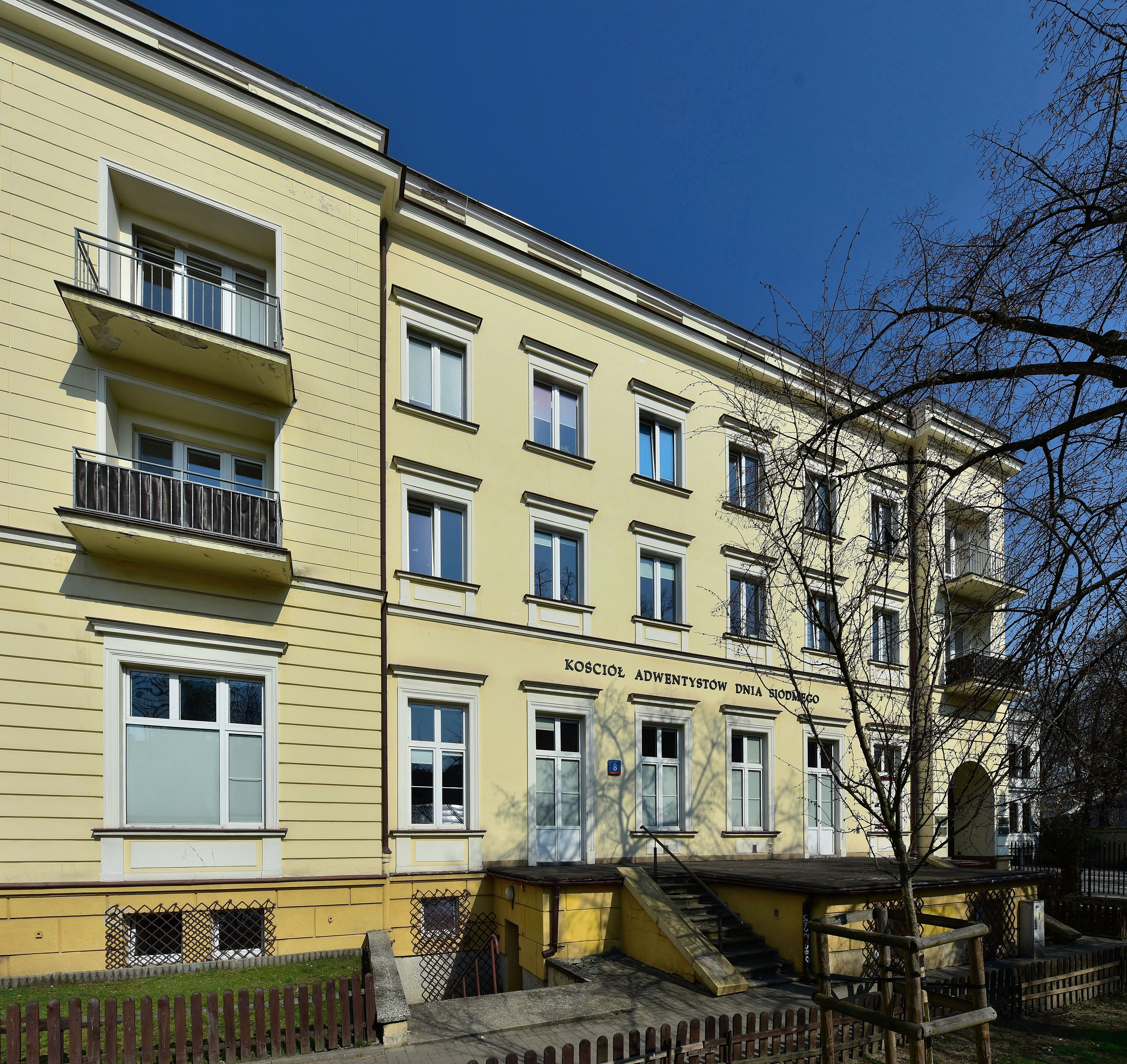
- Headquarters of the Warsaw-Centre Congregation at 8 Foksal Street in Warsaw
- Classification: Protestant
- Orientation: Adventism
- Chairman of the Church Board: Jarosław Dzięgielewski
- Associations: Seventh-day Adventist Church
- Language: Polish
- Territory: Poland
- Origin: 1888; Volhynia
- Congregations: 147
- Members: 9,949
- Official website: https://adwent.pl/

The Seventh-day Adventist Church in Poland is a religious organization in Poland, part of the global Seventh-day Adventist Church. According to church data from 2023, it had 9,949 members and supporters across 147 congregations. However, the 2021 National Census reported just over 3,100 adherents. It ranks as the third-largest Protestant denomination in Poland. The church publishes the monthly magazine Znaki Czasu.

The church was officially registered in 1946, facilitated by its legal operations during the Nazi occupation. Its legal status was formalized by the Act of 30 June 1995 on the Relationship between the State and the Seventh-day Adventist Church in Poland.

== History ==
=== Beginnings to 1939 ===
The pioneer of Adventism in Europe was Polish missionary Michał Belina Czechowski, who introduced Adventism to Italy, Switzerland, Romania, Germany, and Hungary. From Switzerland, Adventist ideas reached Crimea. In Poland, the first Adventist center was established in 1888 in Żarnówek, Volhynia, under Russian rule, through the efforts of Herman Szkubowiec, who arrived from Crimea. By 1893, Adventism spread to Congress Poland. The first congregation was formed in 1895 in Łódź, followed by one in Warsaw in 1900. The Łódź congregation included both Protestants and Catholics, while the Warsaw congregation comprised Catholics, Orthodox, and Protestants.

Adventism reached the Prussian partition in 1895 in Poznań and the Austrian partition in 1903 in Bielsko-Biała. In 1912, the first Polish-Czech diocese was established in Cieszyn Silesia. In 1920, the Southern Diocese was formed in Bielsko-Biała. The Western Diocese was established in Poznań in 1918, and the Eastern Diocese began forming in 1920. On 6–9 October 1921, a national structure was established in Bydgoszcz, uniting the three dioceses under the name "Union of Seventh-day Adventist Congregations", later renamed the "Polish Union Conference of Seventh-day Adventists". Publishing activities began in 1921, a theological seminary was established in 1926, and the church headquarters moved to Warsaw in 1931. A national youth congress was held in 1935. By World War II, the church had about 4,000 members. Key figures included Teodor Will and Wilhelm Czembor, the church leader from 1936.

Between 1931 and 1933, the church faced an internal crisis led by Alfred Kube, who initially opposed reducing congregational autonomy and later rejected some Adventist principles and the role of Ellen G. White. The Kube brothers, Paweł and Alfred, were previously central church leaders. This movement eventually formed the Church of Seventh-day Christians.

During the interwar period, the church was only tolerated, not legally recognized, by Polish authorities. On 16 February 1922, the Ministry of Religious Affairs and Public Education classified Adventists as a tolerated denomination. The church operated under the legal frameworks of the former partitioning powers: in the Russian partition under a 17 October 1906 tsarist decree, in the Austrian partition under association laws, and in the Prussian partition under religious tolerance regulations.

=== World War II ===
During World War II, many Adventist chapels were closed. Pastor Florian Kosmowski died in the Auschwitz concentration camp, and three Adventist officers – Artur, Mieczysław, and Witold Ostapowicz – were killed in Katyn. Helena Gargasz was sentenced to death for hiding Jews, and Janina Boetzel for underground activities. Several Adventists fought in the Warsaw Uprising, including Zbigniew Chmielewski, who died.

Congregations in areas annexed by the Reich or under Soviet occupation were dissolved. In early 1941, Adolf Minck, leader of the Seventh-day Adventist Church in Germany, visited Poland to assess the situation. As a result, the Polish church was placed under the German Adventist Church in Berlin, a move credited by Zachariasz Łyko with saving it from dissolution. In 1942, the church was registered in the General Government under an announcement in the Official Gazette for the General Government (1942, No. 79, p. 178).

=== Polish People's Republic ===
In April 1945, a conference in Radom, organized by Marian Kot, elected Jan Kulak as church leader. The church was legalized on 23 March 1946, due to its legal operations in the General Government from 1942. The Church Council included Jan Kulak (chair), Józef Rosiecki (secretary), and members Franciszek Stekla, Marian Kot, Jan Skrzypaczek, Włodzimierz Siemienowicz, and Jan Górski. On 12 August 1946, the church acquired a building in Kraków at 25 Lubelska Street. The first postwar church congress, held in Kraków from 28 August to 1 September 1946, confirmed Kulak's leadership. Publishing resumed in 1947, and the theological seminary was re-established in Kraków, moving to Bielsko-Biała in 1949 and Podkowa Leśna in 1959. The church headquarters returned to Warsaw in 1949. According to Zachariasz Łyko, 1944–1949 was a rebuilding period.

Initially, the Polish People's Republic viewed the church as undesirable, pursuing a liquidation policy. After 1956, this shifted to regulation, but the Office for Religious Affairs and Ministry of Internal Affairs achieved full control. Jan Kulak aligned with state religious policies. From 1953 to 1956, Franciszek Stekla operated underground, supported by 80–85% of members. The state-controlled Union of Congregations did not represent the Adventist community, with true religious life occurring in private homes. During Stalinism, some leaders, including Andrzej Maszczak and Konrad Janyszka, were arrested. Łyko described the period between 1949 and 1957 as a challenging period marked by external Stalinist threats and internal organizational disputes.

In 1961, the church adopted the name "Seventh-day Adventist Church". Its internal regulations were approved on 7 June 1966.

Between 1976 and 1977, the Department IV of the Ministry of Internal Affairs ordered investigations into internal church factions, schismatic activities, and Western contacts, instructing agents "Majewski" and "Marek" to produce materials discrediting the Catholic Church. Between 1978 and 1979, the department aimed to strengthen control over church leadership, influence the General Conference and Trans-European Division in London, and counter anti-communist actions. The church's publishing house was used to produce anti-Catholic materials for domestic and international distribution, leveraging its anti-Catholic doctrine.

In 1987, the Senate of the Christian Theological Academy in Warsaw awarded Bert Beverly Beach, a General Conference director, an honorary doctorate.

=== Third Republic of Poland ===
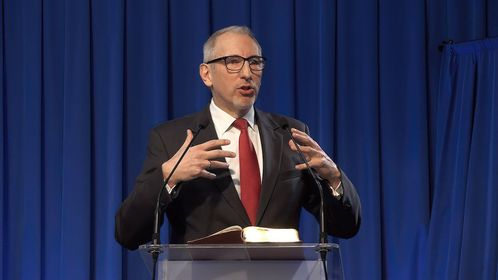
Andrzej Siciński preaches in Podkowa Leśna

The church's legal status and state relations are governed by the Act of 30 June 1995, signed by President Lech Wałęsa. After the Wildstein list was published, discussions about lustration arose within the church. Church leaders opposed lustration, with Andrzej Siciński arguing in Znaki Czasu that it would be selective based on available files.

=== Gallery of selected Houses of Prayer ===
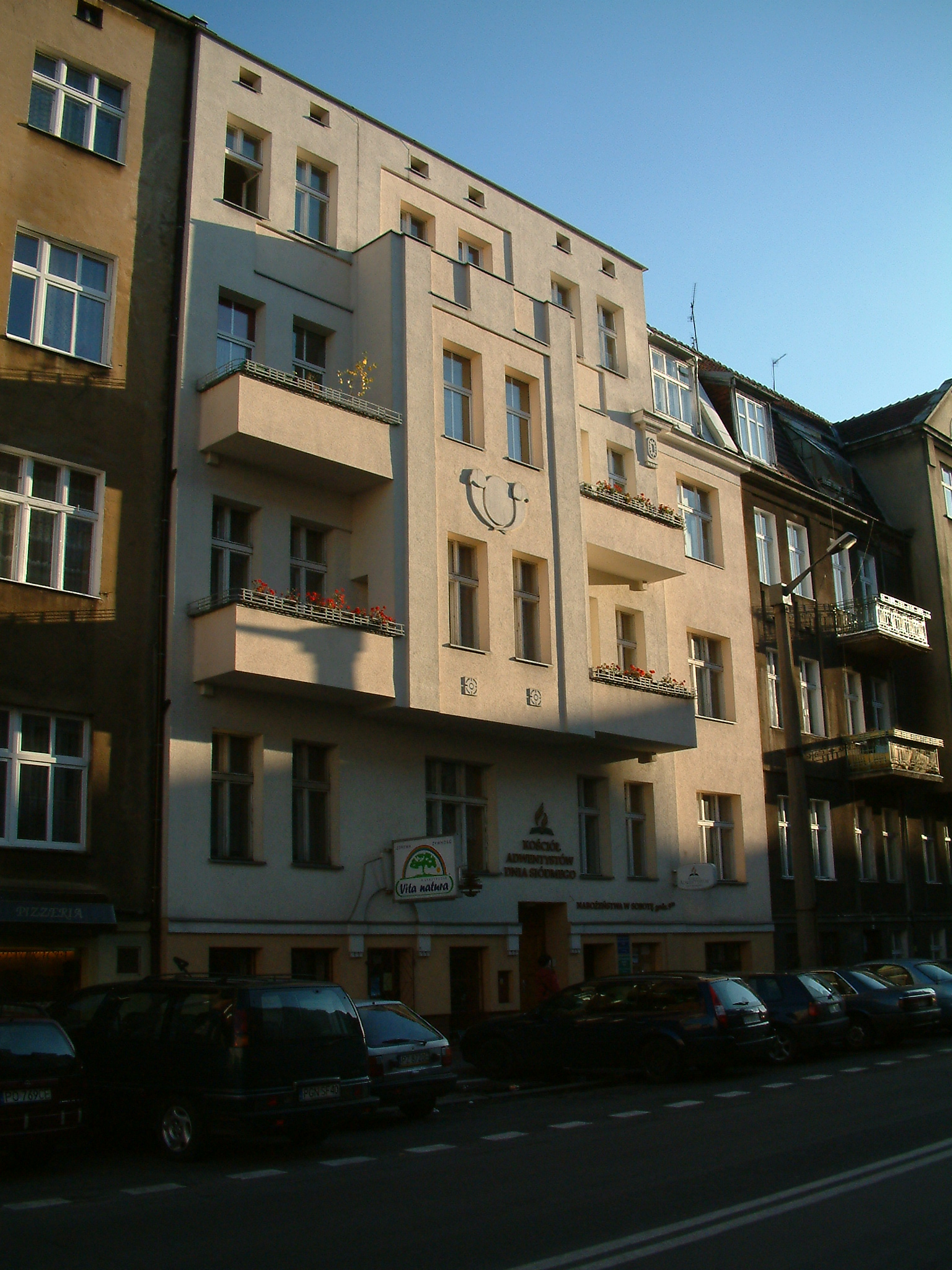
House of prayer in Poznań

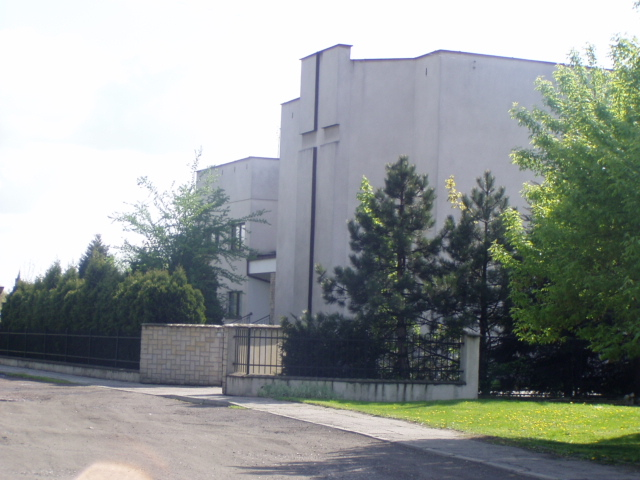
House of prayer in Pszczyna

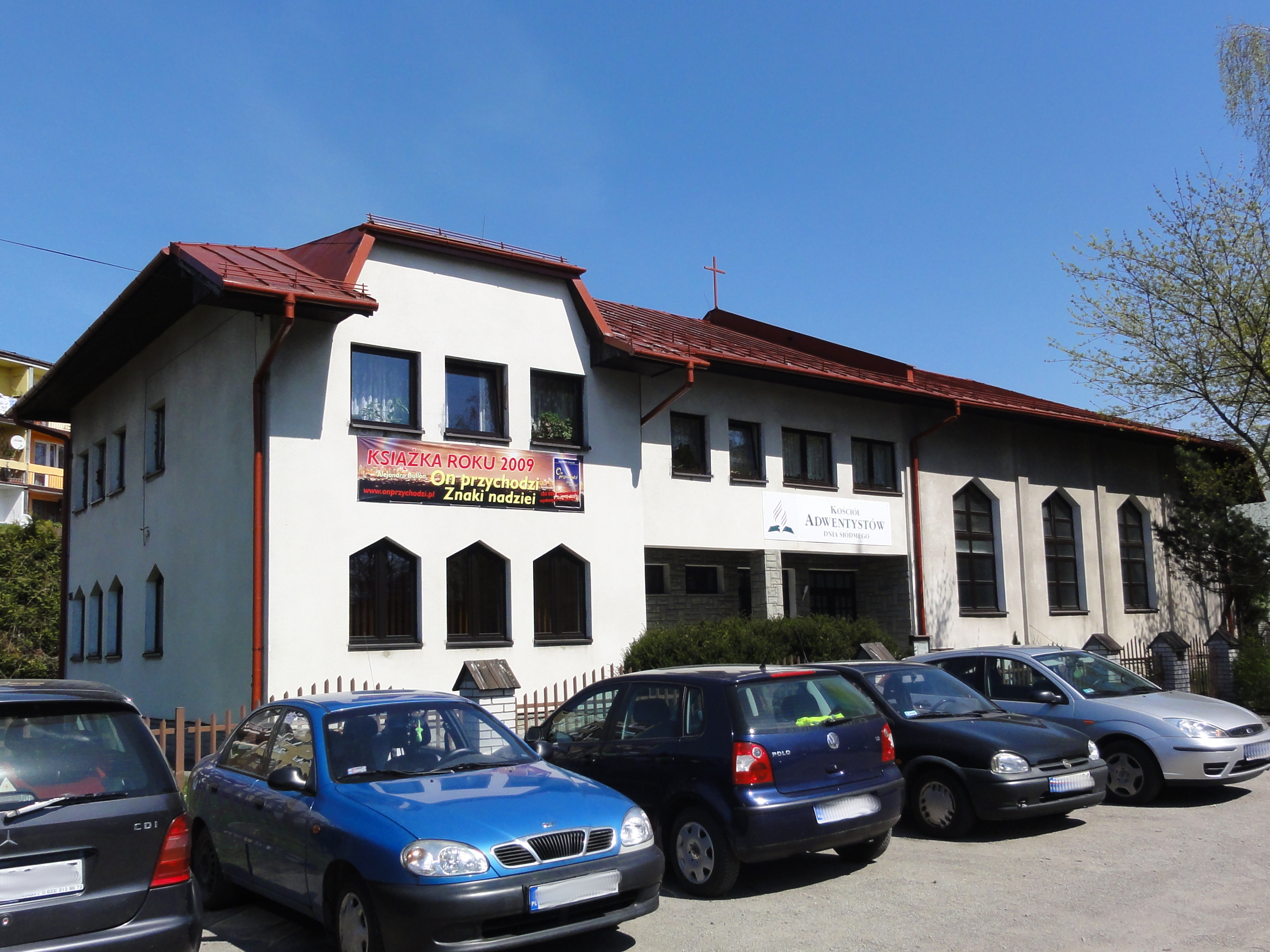
House of prayer in Skoczów

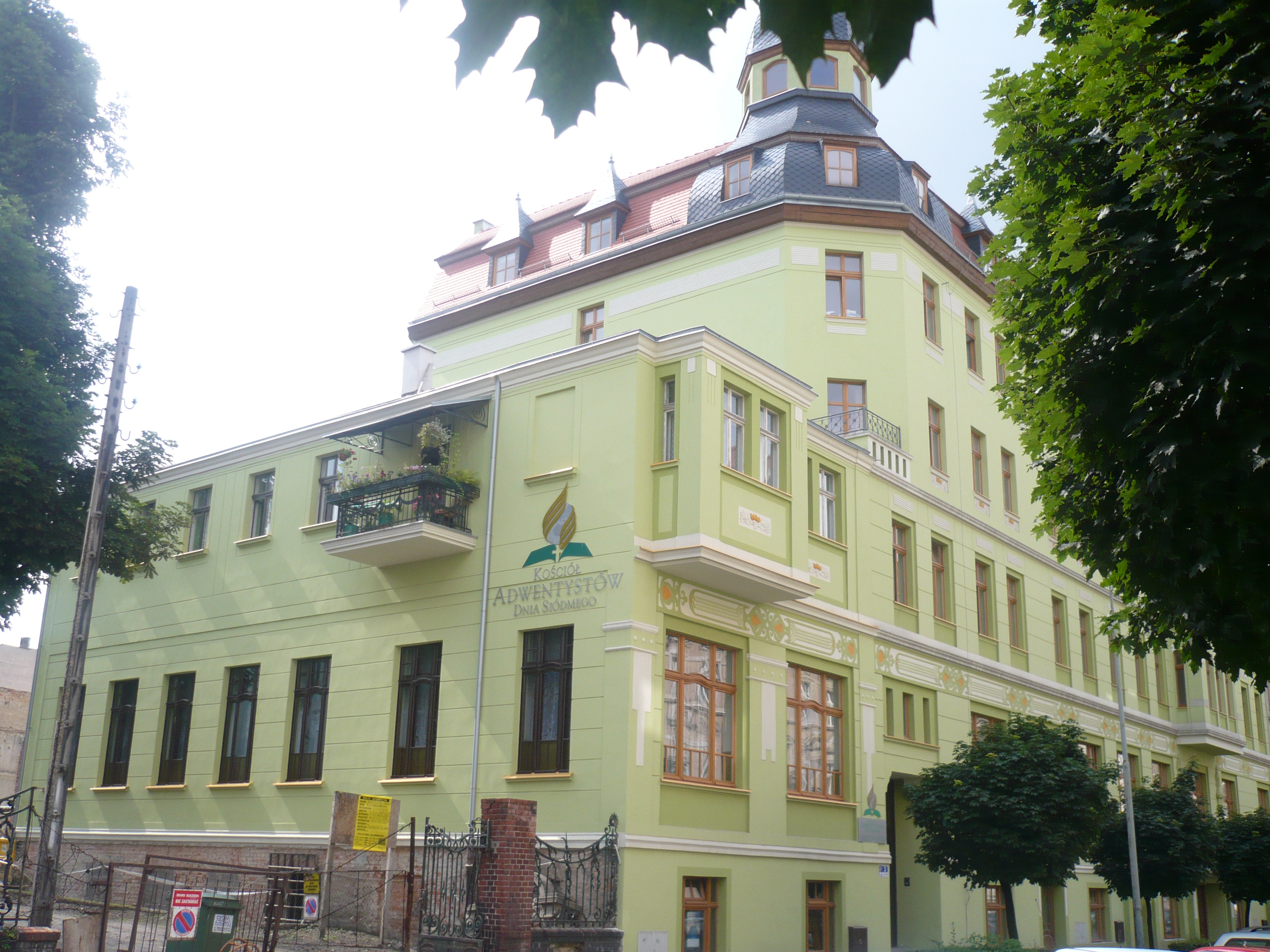
House of prayer in Świdnica

== Ecumenism ==
Despite its anti-Catholic stance, the church has engaged in ecumenical dialogue with the Catholic Church since 1984, initiated primarily by Zachariasz Łyko. On 14 December 1999, marking 15 years of dialogue, a meeting was held in the Primate's Hall at the Palace of the Warsaw Archbishops at 19 Miodowa Street in Warsaw. Representing the Adventists were Zachariasz Łyko, Andrzej Siciński, and Bernard Koziróg; the Catholics were represented by Lucjan Balter, Michał Czajkowski, and Marcin Wojtowicz. A joint statement was signed, with the Catholic Church affirming that Adventists are not a sect, and Adventists expressing respect for the Catholic Church. In 2008, after Łyko's death, Paweł Lazar requested a suspension of the dialogue.

From 1946 to 1950, the church was part of the Christian Ecumenical Council (now the Polish Ecumenical Council). It maintains ties with the Polish Ecumenical Council and is active in the Polish Bible Society. Since 1993, it has been a member of the Polish Bible Society, participating in the Ecumenical Bible translation. Andrzej Siciński noted that this involvement counters claims of the church being a sect.

== Activities ==
The church operates Znaki Czasu Publishing House, the Voice of Hope Radio and Television Center, a Correspondence Bible School, a Correspondence School for Better Living, the Christian Charity Service, the Samaritan Care Home, and several health centers. It is supported by the Source of Life Foundation and Nadzieja.pl Sp. z o.o., a public benefit organization running a niche Christian web portal.

== Statistics ==
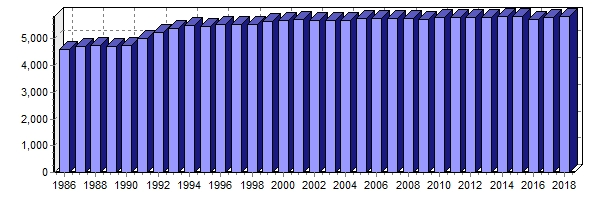
Membership statistics of the Seventh-day Adventist Church in Poland, 1986–2018

In early 1947, the Polish Union Conference had about 5,000 members. Between 1949 and 1950, it had 5,958 members in 62 congregations and 38 outposts. In 2011, the church reported 5,790 baptized members, with approximately 9,600 including children and supporters, though the 2011 National Census recorded 4,947 adherents. In 2017, the church reported 5,796 baptized members, totaling about 9,660 with children and supporters in 145 congregations. The 2021 Census reported 3,129 adherents.

=== Membership data from church surveys ===
Membership, congregations, and clergy of the Seventh-day Adventist Church in Poland (church-reported data to Statistics Poland)
Year	Members	Congregations	Churches/Chapels	Clergy
1989	9,236	123	123	89
1990	9,618	123	123	89
1991	8,418	99	110	86
1992	8,915	135	111	91
1994	10,024	160	69	81
1995	6,958	138	68	79
1996	6,720	140	78	68
1998	9,189	139		76
1999	9,303	141		61
2000	9,492	151	88	69
2001	9,416	146		70
2002	9,484	148		68
2003	9,487	150		70
2004	9,488	152		59
2005	9,620	150	82	70
2006	9,620	151		59
2007	9,595	153		71
2008	9,614	154		60
2009	9,534	155	83	58
2010	9,624	155	84	62
2011	9,654	152		61
2012	9,638	148	91	68
2013	9,658	150	94	67
2014	9,734	150	93	68
2015	9,698	148	92	66
2016	9,565	147	92	61
2017	9,660	145	104	68
2018	9,726	144	107	65
2019	8,599	144	105	67
2020	9,838	146	103	74
2021	9,733	128	119	78
2022	9,734	145		74
2023	9,949	147		137

=== Census data ===
Declared affiliation with the Seventh-day Adventist Church in national censuses
Census	Declared members
2011 Census	4,947
2021 Census	3,129

== See also ==
- Seventh-day Adventist eschatology
- General Conference of Seventh-day Adventists

== Bibliography ==
- Łyko, Zachariasz (2000). Kościół Adwentystów Dnia Siódmego. Historia, nauka, ustrój, posłannictwo [Seventh-day Adventist Church: History, Doctrine, Structure, Mission] (in Polish). Warsaw: Znaki Czasu. ISBN 83-87188-82-4.
- Michalak, Ryszard (2014). Polityka wyznaniowa państwa polskiego wobec mniejszości religijnych w latach 1945–1989 [Polish State Religious Policy Toward Religious Minorities 1945–1989] (in Polish). Zielona Góra: University of Zielona Góra. ISBN 978-83-7842-124-5.
