= Catholic Church and deism =

Relationship of Catholic theology and deism

Catholicism and Deism are two theologies that have opposed each other in matters of the role of God in the world. Deism is the philosophical belief which posits that although God exists as the uncaused First Cause, responsible for the creation of the universe, God does not interact directly with that subsequently created world. As deism is not organized, its adherents differ widely in important matters of belief, but all are in agreement in denying the significance of revelation in Christian Scripture and Tradition. Deists argue against Catholicism by either, only considering Scripture to be a helpful moral tool, or denying: its divine character, the infallibility of the Church and Traditions, and the validity of its evidence as a complete manifestation of the will of God. Deism is first considered to have manifested itself in England towards the latter end of the seventeenth century.

== Description ==
A Deist is defined as "One who believes in the existence of a God or Supreme Being but denies revealed religion, basing his belief on the light of nature and reason." Deists generally reject the Trinity, the incarnation, the divine origin and authority of the Bible, miracles, and supernatural forces. Because of the individualistic standpoint which they adopt, it is difficult to class together the representative writers who contributed to the literature of English deism as forming any one definite school, or to group together the positive teachings contained in their writings as any one systematic expression of a concordant philosophy. There is no central authority that defines Deist beliefs and practices, resulting in considerable variation among Deists. Many Deists held materialistic doctrines, and the French thinkers who later expanded on the ideas of the English Deists were almost exclusively materialistic. Others rested content with a criticism of ecclesiastical authority in teaching the inspiration of the Sacred Scriptures, or the fact of an external revelation of supernatural truth given by God to man. Deism inevitably undermined the personal religion of the Judeo-Christian tradition. "Since the beginning the Christian faith has been challenged by responses to the question of origins that differ from its own...Some admit that the world was made by God, but as by a watch-maker who, once he has made a watch, abandons it to itself (Deism)."

In 2013, Catholic author Al Kresta wrote that "Newton's mechanics turn into the clockwork universe of deism."

== History ==
C.J. Betts argues that the accounts of Deists at Lyon (France) suggest that the origin of the term Deism lies in the anti-Trinitarian movement which was then an important phenomenon in the religious life of Europe. Using the word 'Deist' Verit was likely referring to a group of Lyonnaise anti-Trinitarians. In England the deistical movement seems to be an almost necessary outcome of the political and religious conditions of the time and country. The Renaissance had fairly swept away the later scholasticism and with it, very largely, the constructive philosophy of the Middle Ages. The Protestant Reformation, in its open revolt against the authority of the Catholic Church, had inaugurated a slow revolution, in which all religious pretensions were to be involved. The new life of the empirical sciences, the enormous enlargement of the physical horizon in such discoveries as those of astronomy and geography, the philosophical doubt and rationalistic method of Descartes, the advocated empiricism of Bacon, the political changes of the times--all these things were factors in the preparation and arrangement of a stage upon which a criticism levelled at revelational religion might come forward and play its part. And though the first essays of deism were somewhat veiled and intentionally indirect in their attack upon revelation, with the revolution and the civil and religious liberty consequent upon it, with the spread of the critical and empirical spirit as exemplified in the philosophy of Locke, the time was ripe for the full rehearsal of the case against Christianity as expounded by the Establishment and the sects. The issue of private judgment had split Protestantism into a great number of conflicting sects.

According to Avery Dulles, "Deism drew its vitality from the oppressive policies of the religious establishments against which it was reacting."

The Catholic Encyclopedia (1913) recounts Catholic opposition in this period to Deism:

The deistical tendency passed through several more or less clearly defined phases. All the forces possible were mustered against its advance. Parliaments took cognizance of it. Some of the productions of the deists were publicly burnt. The bishops and clergy of the Establishment were strenuous in resisting it. For every pamphlet or book that a deist wrote, several "answers" were at once put before the public as antidotes. Bishops addressed pastoral letters to their dioceses warning the faithful of the danger. Woolston's "Moderator" provoked no less than five such pastorals from the Bishop of London. All that was ecclesiastically official and respectable was ranged in opposition to the movement, and the deists were held up to general detestation in the strongest terms.

The last case of an execution by the inquisition was that of the schoolmaster Cayetano Ripoll, accused of deism by the waning Spanish Inquisition and hanged on 26 July 1826 in Valencia after a two-year trial.

== Catholic philosophers foreshadowing deism ==
In addition to the 13th century Averroist movement, the 1911 Encyclopædia Britannica identified the following philosophers as men whose writings foreshadowed deism:

- Giovanni Boccaccio
- Petrarch
- Thomas More, in his Utopia
- Michel de Montaigne
- Pierre Charron
- Jean Bodin (nominal Catholic)

== Catholic influence on deism ==
Deism relies on the teleological argument for the existence of God on the basis of his orderly design. This concept, which was present in both Classical philosophy and the Bible, was also taught within Catholicism, such as in the writings of Thomas Aquinas.

In his Meditations on First Philosophy René Descartes sets forth two proofs for God's existence. Descartes considered himself to be a devout Catholic, and one of the purposes of the Meditations was to defend the Catholic faith. His attempt to ground theological beliefs on reason encountered intense opposition in his time, however: Pascal regarded Descartes's views as rationalist and mechanist, and accused him of deism. "I cannot forgive Descartes; in all his philosophy, Descartes did his best to dispense with God. But Descartes could not avoid prodding God to set the world in motion with a snap of his lordly fingers; after that, he had no more use for God." Descartes steered clear of theological questions, restricting his attention to showing that there is no incompatibility between his metaphysics and theological orthodoxy. Later on, Cartesian dualism reinforced natural theology in 18th century French deism, especially in the writings of Claude Gilbert and in the anonymous Militaire philosophe.

18th century Irish Protestant clergyman Philip Skelton argued that Deists and Catholics were allied in certain matters. In particular, they both attacked certain arrangements involving the government and the Church of England. Skelton noted that although deists sometimes railed against Protestant writers, they never argued against them; deist writers argued against Protestant rather than Catholic writers. Skelton was of the opinion that some deists would actually convert to Catholicism prior to death. Skelton felt that Catholics and deists had similar positions on the authority of Scripture, the indulgence of vice, and even purgatory. Skelton also thought that since Protestants and deists were equally heretics in the eyes of the Catholics anyway, they had no real reason to favor Protestants against the deists. Rather, Skelton thought Catholic apologists would prefer to work with a Deist than a Protestant, as it is easier to convert someone who is an unbeliever already. As part of his argument, Skelton cited the Jesuit educations of the prominent deists Matthew Tindal and John Toland and also noted that Pilloniere was once a member of the Jesuit order himself.

== Catholic viewpoint ==
In 1824 Pope Leo XII issued Ubi Primum discussing a number of concerns, from bishops residing in their dioceses to the popularity of indifferentism, which he also associated with deism. "The current indifferentism has developed to the point of arguing that everyone is on the right road. This includes not only all those sects which though outside the Catholic Church verbally accept revelation as a foundation, but those groups too which spurn the idea of divine revelation and profess a pure deism or even a pure naturalism... But a tolerance which extends to Deism and Naturalism, which even the ancient heretics rejected, can never be approved by anyone who uses his reason."

Contrary to the image of a clockmaker, the Catholic Church teaches that creation is a continuing work of God, in which man shares. "With creation, God does not abandon his creatures to themselves. He not only gives them being and existence, but also, and at every moment, upholds and sustains them in being..."

== See also ==
- Catholic Church and Pandeism
- Deism in England and France in the 18th century
