= Journal of Philosophical Research =

- Discipline: Philosophy
- Language: English, French
- Edited by: Raja Halwani

Publication details
- Former name: Philosophy Research Archives
- History: 1975–present
- Publisher: Philosophy Documentation Center (United States)
- Frequency: Annual

Standard abbreviations
- ISO 4: J. Philos. Res.

Indexing
- ISSN: 1053-8364 (print); 2153-7984 (web)
- LCCN: 91-644414
- OCLC no.: 21948591

Links
- Journal homepage; Online access; Online archives

The Journal of Philosophical Research is a peer-reviewed academic journal sponsored by the University of Notre Dame and the Canadian Philosophical Association. It publishes articles in English or French, from any philosophical orientation. The current editor-in-chief is Raja Halwani (School of the Art Institute of Chicago). It is published by the Philosophy Documentation Center.

== History of the journal ==
The journal was established as the Philosophy Research Archives in 1975 by the Philosophy Documentation Center, American Philosophical Association, and the Canadian Philosophical Association. It was jointly planned by these organizations as a solution to the space limitations of traditional journals. Microfiche was the original format of publication and no limit was placed on the length of submissions. The journal accepted submissions in English or French, and the editorial team was led by William Alston. Volumes 1-7 (1975–1981) were published exclusively in microfiche format; volumes 8-14 (1982–1989) were published in a combination of microfiche and print formats. Shorter articles were published in the print portion of these volumes and longer pieces were placed in the microfiche supplements. In 1990 the journal was reorganized as the Journal of Philosophical Research, and it continues to publish works of unusual length, such as bibliographies, translations, and commentaries. All material originally published on microfiche is available online.

== Supplements ==
The Journal of Philosophical Research has occasionally published special supplements in cooperation with the International Federation of Philosophical Societies and the American Philosophical Association.

- Selected Papers from the XXIII World Congress of Philosophy (2015)
- Selected Papers from the XXII World Congress of Philosophy (2012)
- Ethics and the Life Sciences, edited by Frederick Adams (2007)
- Ethical Issues for the Twenty-First Century, edited by Frederick Adams (2005)
- Philosophy in America at the Turn of the Century, APA Centennial Supplement (2003)

== Abstracting and indexing ==
The journal is abstracted and indexed in:

- Academic Search Premier
- Arts & Humanities Citation Index
- Expanded Academic ASAP
- FRANCIS
- Humanities International Index
- Index Philosophicus
- InfoTrac OneFile
- International Bibliography of Periodical Literature
- International Philosophical Bibliography
- MLA International Bibliography
- Philosopher's Index
- PhilPapers
- Scopus

== See also ==
- List of philosophy journals
