= Helmut Wautischer =

Austrian philosopher (born 1954)

- Born: June 15, 1954 (age 71); Klagenfurt, Kärnten, Austria

Philosophical work
- Era: Contemporary philosophy
- Region: Western Philosophy
- Main interests: Consciousness, German Idealism, Philosophical anthropology, epistemology, ethnomethodology

Helmut Wautischer is an Austrian philosopher. He is a retired senior philosophy lecturer at Sonoma State University. He received his Bachelor's degree from the Bundeshandelsakademie Klagenfurt and a PhD in philosophy from Karl-Franzens University of Graz where he studied with Rudolf Haller and Ernst Topitsch. He was inspired by the writings of Carlos Castaneda and received a Fulbright scholarship for research on this subject at UCLA, leading to his dissertation, Methodology and Knowledge. Proposing an Expanded Science of Man. He has published essays in scholarly journals, such as Polylog, Prima Philosophia, Dialogue and Humanism, Anthropology of Consciousness, Shaman, Journal of Ritual Studies, and Journal of Ethical Studies.

He presented papers at the World Congresses of Philosophy (Moscow 1993, Boston 1998, Istanbul 2003, Athens 2013, Beijing 2018), Tucson Center for Consciousness Studies, American Philosophical Association, American Anthropological Association, the Austrian Association for Philosophy, International Conference on the Study of Shamanism and Alternative Modes of Healing, and other venues. He is the current president of the Karl Jaspers Society of North America since 2006, and is the founding editor (with Alan M. Olson) and editor-in-chief of the online journal Existenz. and was an elected member to the SSU Academic Senate.

== Books ==
- Tribal Epistemologies: Essays in the Philosophy of Anthropology, ISBN 1-84014-128-X
- Ontology of Consciousness: Percipient Action, ISBN 978-0-262-73184-3
- Philosophical Faith and the Future of Humanity, ISBN 978-94-007-2222-4
