= Existenz (disambiguation) =

Existenz may refer to:

- Existenz, a 1999 science fiction film
- Existenz (journal), an open source journal sponsored by the Karl Jaspers Society of North America
- Existenz (Jaspers), a philosophical term introduced by Karl Jaspers

== See also ==
- Existence
