= Adolf Minck =

German Adventist leader during the Nazi era

- Born: September 4, 1883
- Died: May 16, 1960 (aged 76)
- Religion: Adventism
- Church: Seventh-day Adventist Church in Germany
- Offices held: President of the Church in Germany (1933–1950); President of the Central European Division (1937–1950)

Adolf Minck (4 September 1883 – 16 May 1960) was a prominent leader of the Seventh-day Adventist Church in Germany during the Nazi era. From 1937 to 1950, he served as president of the Central European Division of the Church. Earlier, he led the Hungarian Union (Hungarian Diocese). During his tenure, he complied with directives from the Nazi regime.

== Clerical career ==
At age 25, Minck was baptized and joined the Seventh-day Adventist Church, beginning his pastoral work in 1910. In 1913, he served in Sarajevo, and in 1914, he was sent to Hungary, where he was mobilized during World War I.

After the war, he resided in Budapest and worked in Hungary. In 1921, he became president of the Hungarian Diocese. In 1933, he relocated to Berlin, serving as secretary of the Central European Division. By 1937, he was appointed president of the division, a role he held until 1950. After 1950, he served as secretary of the division and was succeeded as church president in Germany by Wilhelm Müller.

In early 1941, Minck visited Poland to assess the situation of the Seventh-day Adventist Church in Poland. Following his visit, the Polish church was placed under the authority of the German Adventist Church in Berlin. According to historian Zachariasz Łyko, this decision likely prevented the dissolution of the Polish church.

Minck also worked at the Advent-Verlag publishing house, initially in its Hungarian section and from 1933 in its general operations. In 1933, he became editor-in-chief of the quarterly journal Aller Diener and promoted healthy living initiatives. After the war, James Lamar McElhany, president of the General Conference of Seventh-day Adventists, urged Minck in April 1947 to purge the church leadership of Nazi-affiliated elements. Minck responded that individuals were accountable for their actions before God.

In July 1950, at the General Conference in San Francisco, Minck was nominated for re-election as president but faced opposition from Wilhelm Müller, who criticized his lack of firmness against Nazis. The nomination was rejected, and Müller was elected instead, though some German delegates questioned the election's validity.

== Relationship with Nazism ==
Upon becoming leader of the German Seventh-day Adventist Church in 1933, Minck declared, "We are not unprepared for the new order", pledging to support the Nazi regime's agenda, three months after Adolf Hitler became chancellor. He viewed Hitler's rise as a revitalizing force akin to the Reformation.

On 29 April 1936, the Nazi state banned the Seventh Day Adventist Reform Movement. The Adventist leadership promptly issued a directive prohibiting members from associating with reform Adventists and excluding Adventists of Jewish descent from the church, also forbidding aid to them.

In 1940, Minck stated that every Adventist would fulfill their duty "during this time of war", citing Romans 7:12 ("The law is holy, and the commandment is holy"). On 4 April 1941, the Nazi regime banned Adventist activities in Gdańsk and West Prussia. On 24 June 1941, three days after the invasion of the Soviet Union, Minck wrote to the Gdańsk gauleiter, affirming the church's loyal service to the Third Reich and describing it as his "noblest duty".

Throughout the Third Reich, Minck complied with Nazi directives, including those requiring work on Saturdays, a sacred day for Adventists. After the war, he claimed, "The Sword of Damocles hung over us all those years", asserting that his actions ensured the denomination's survival without violating biblical principles.

== Bibliography ==
- Alomia, J. Harold (2010). "Fatal Flirting: The Nazi State and the Seventh-day Adventist Church". Journal of Adventist Mission Studies. 6 (1): 2–14. doi:10.32597/jams/vol6/iss1/2/.
- Blaich, Roland (1993). "Religion under National Socialism: The Case of the German Adventist Church". Central European History. 26 (3): 255–280. doi:10.1017/S0008938900009134.
- Yearbook of the Seventh Day Adventist Church Denomination. Washington: Review and Herald Publishing Association. 1933.
