= Dermot Moran =

Irish philosopher

Dermot Moran (/məˈrɑːn/; born 1953) is an Irish philosopher specialising in phenomenology and in medieval philosophy, and he is also active in the dialogue between analytic and continental philosophy. He is the inaugural holder of the Joseph Chair in Catholic Philosophy at Boston College. He is a member of the Royal Irish Academy and a founding editor of the International Journal of Philosophical Studies.

== Biography ==
Dermot Moran was born in Stillorgan, Dublin, Ireland. He was educated at Oatlands College, primary and secondary schools where he specialised in the sciences, but was also active in debating in English and Irish. He was awarded the Higgins Gold Medal for Chemistry there in 1968, as well as the Institute of Chemists of Ireland Gold Medal for Chemistry in 1970. He is a published poet and was awarded the Irish Press New Irish Writing literary award for his poetry. Having studied mathematics, applied mathematics, physics and chemistry for the Leaving Certificate examination, he decided to study languages and literature in university.

He entered University College Dublin in 1970 on the basis of a UCD entrance scholarship and completed his BA in 1973, graduating with a double first class honours degree in English and philosophy. He was the recipient of Wilmarth Lewis Scholarship to Yale University for graduate study. He graduated from Yale University with MA (1974), MPhil (1976) and PhD (1986) degrees in philosophy. He then returned to Ireland to take up a post at Queen's University of Belfast. He taught at Queen's Belfast from 1979 to 1982, and then moved to a permanent lectureship in St Patrick's College Maynooth, then a Recognised College of the National University of Ireland.

In 1989, he was appointed to the chair of philosophy (metaphysics and logic) at University College Dublin. In 1992–1993, he was a visiting professor at Connecticut College, and in fall 2003 and spring 2006 he was Lynette S. Autry Professor of Humanities at Rice University. In 2007, he was visiting professor at Northwestern University, Evanston, Illinois. He is a visiting professor in other institutions around the world, including Sorbonne, University at Albany, SUNY, Catholic University of Leuven, Trinity College Dublin, and LMU Munich.

He has been an elected member of the Royal Irish Academy since March 2003, and was awarded the Royal Irish Academy Gold Medal in the Humanities in 2012. He has been involved in the Fédération Internationale des Sociétés de Philosophie, the highest non-governmental world organisation for philosophy, since the 1980s.

He is the founding editor of International Journal of Philosophical Studies, founded in 1993 and published by Routledge, and co-editor of Contributions to Phenomenology book series, published by Springer.

His monograph, Introduction to Phenomenology was awarded the Edward Goodwin Ballard Prize in Phenomenology (2001) and was translated into Chinese and Persian. Moran served both as president of the programme committee for the 23rd World Congress of Philosophy which took place in Athens from 4 to 10 August 2013, and as president of the 24th World Congress of Philosophy which took place in Beijing from 13 to 20 August 2018.

In 2010, he was guest professor at the Chinese University of Hong Kong for the Edwin Cheng Foundation Summer School in Phenomenology.

== Authored books ==
- The Husserl Dictionary. Bloomsbury, 2012, co-authored with Joseph Cohen. ISBN 9781441112446
- Husserl's Crisis of the European Sciences and Transcendental Phenomenology: An Introduction. Cambridge: Cambridge University Press, 2012. ISBN 9780521895361
- Edmund Husserl: Founder of Phenomenology. Polity Press, 2005. ISBN 9780745621227
- Introduction to Phenomenology. London and New York: Routledge, 2000. ISBN 9780415183734
- The Philosophy of John Scottus Eriugena. A Study of Idealism in the Middle Ages. Cambridge: Cambridge University Press, 1989. ISBN 9780521345491

== Edited books ==
- Edmund Husserl, Ideas: A General Introduction to Pure Phenomenology. Edited with a new foreword by Dermot Moran. Routledge Classics, 2012.
- Phenomenology 2010, Volume 4: Traditions, Transitions and Challenges. Edited by Dermot Moran and Hans Rainer Sepp. Zeta Books, 2010.
- The Routledge Companion to Twentieth Century Philosophy. Edited by Dermot Moran. London and New York: Routledge, 2008.
- Epistemology. The Proceedings of the Twenty-First World Congress of Philosophy, held in Istanbul, Turkey in 2003, Volume 6. Ed. Dermot Moran and Stephen Voss. Ankara: Philosophical Society of Turkey, 2007. pp. vii +162.
- Eriugena, Berkeley, and the Idealist Tradition. Edited by Stephen Gersh and Dermot Moran. Notre Dame: University of Notre Dame Press, 2006.
- Phenomenology: Critical Concepts in Philosophy. 4 Vols. Edited by Lester Embree and Dermot Moran. Routledge Press, 2004.
- The Phenomenology Reader. Edited by Dermot Moran and Timothy Mooney. London and New York: Routledge, 2001.
- Edmund Husserl, Logical Investigations. Three volumes. Translated by J. N. Findlay. Edited and revised with a new Introduction by Dermot Moran and new Preface by Michael Dummett. London and New York: Routledge, 2001.
