= Seventh-day Adventist Church in Germany =

Protestant denomination in Germany

- Freikirche der Siebenten-Tags-Adventisten in Deutschland
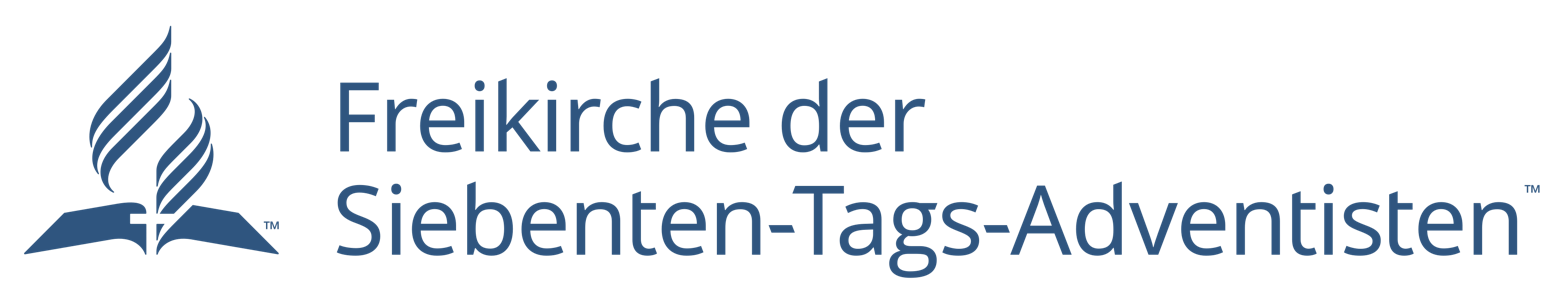
- Classification: Christianity
- Orientation: Protestantism
- Theology: Adventism
- Polity: Representative
- Governance: Church Conference, Church Council, and Church Board
- Leader: Johannes Naether and Werner Dullinger
- Region: Germany
- Headquarters: Hanover and Ostfildern
- Origin: 1874
- Congregations: 558
- Members: 34,348
- Official website: www.adventisten.de

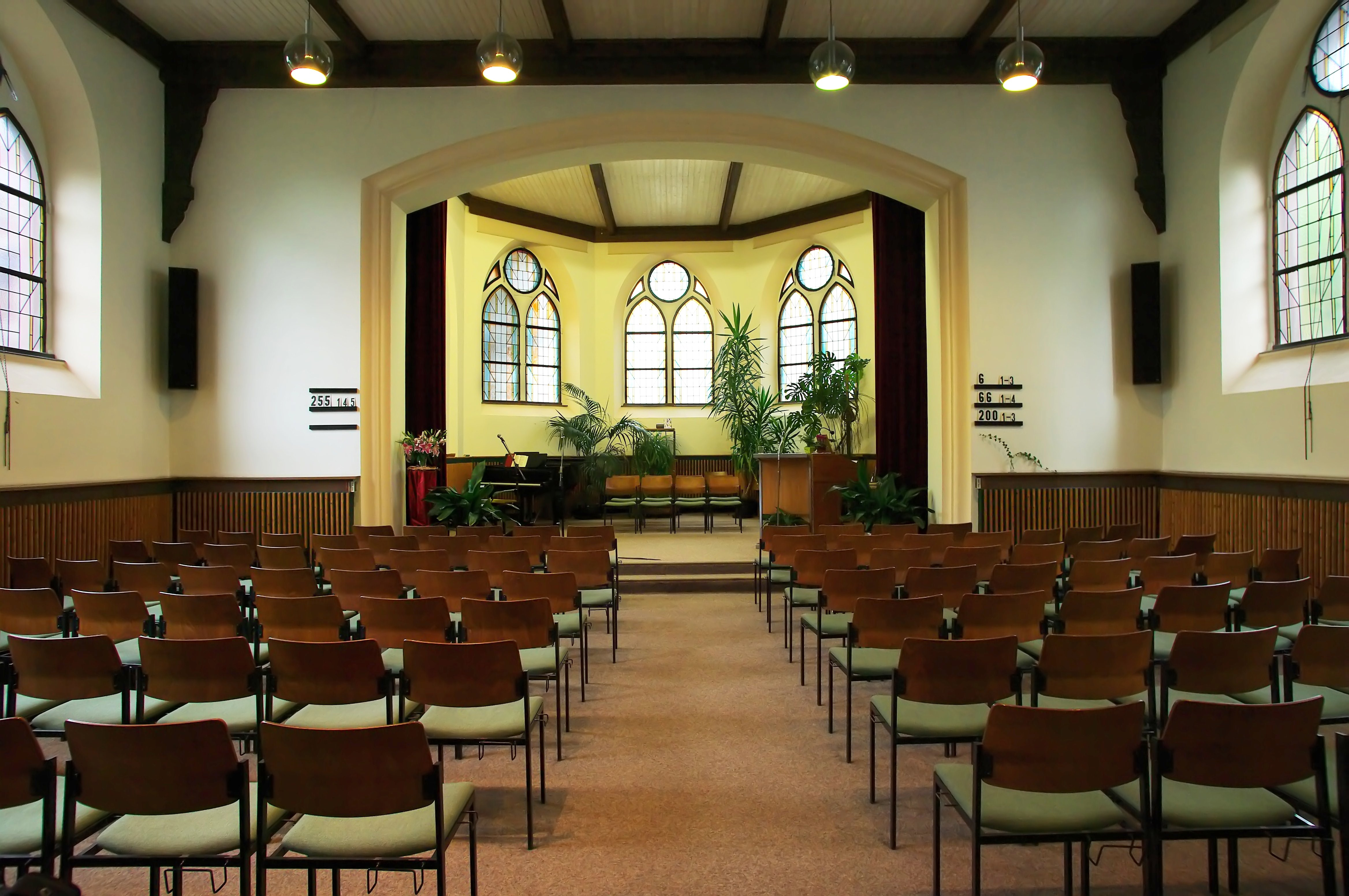
Interior of the chapel in Freiburg

Seventh-day Adventist Church in Germany (German: Freikirche der Siebenten-Tags-Adventisten) is an Adventist denomination in Germany, part of the global Seventh-day Adventist Church. In 2017, the Church had 558 congregations and 34,000 members. From the 1990s, the church began to decline.

== History ==
=== Beginnings ===
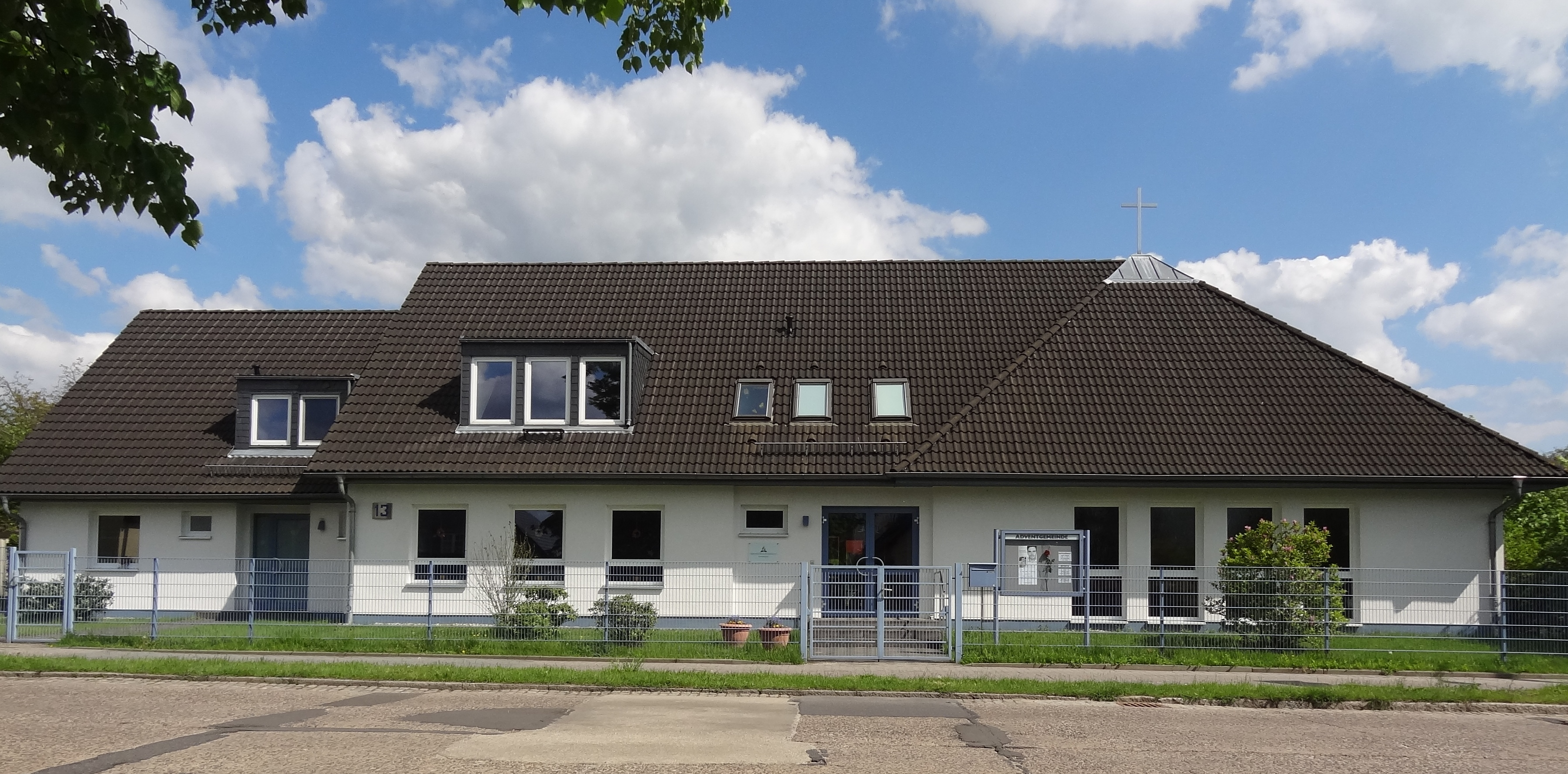
Adventist congregation in Cottbus

Adventists arrived in Europe after 1874. John Nevins Andrews came to Basel as an official Seventh-day Adventist missionary. In 1888, Ludwig Richard Conradi arrived in Germany, known for effectively spreading Adventism among German-speaking Americans. In 1889, he established the church's headquarters in Hamburg. Conradi also founded an Adventist school in Friedensau, near Magdeburg, named Friedensau Missionary Seminary.

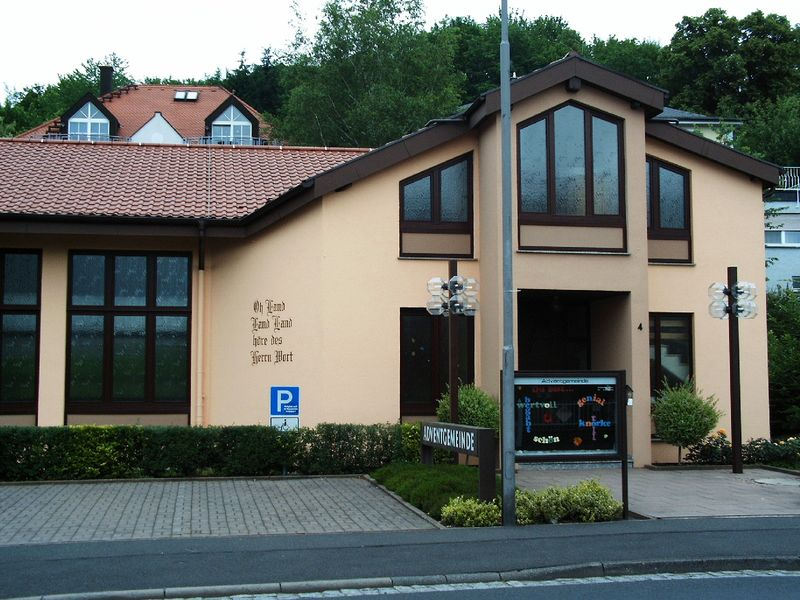
Adventgemeinde Gelnhausen

Adventists faced numerous obstacles in Germany from the state, primarily for not sending children to Sunday school and their negative stance toward military service, which led to imprisonments. Eventually, authorities permitted Saturday schools. Refusal of military service stemmed from reluctance to bear arms, justified by the commandment "Thou shalt not kill" and the prohibition of work on the Sabbath.

During World War I, European Adventist leaders had to address the issue of military service in wartime for the first time. On 2 August 1914, G. Dail, secretary of the European Division, and two days later H. F. Schuberth, president of the East German Union, declared in writing their participation in military actions. Some young Adventists were executed for refusing military service during World War I, though the exact number is unknown. Amid responsibility for young members, Conradi decided to allow Adventists to participate in military actions. In 1916, three main Adventist leaders in Germany published a brochure, Der Christ und der Krieg (Christianity and War), declaring that church members would undertake military service, including on the Sabbath. This led to the exclusion of over 2,000 Adventists who opposed military service, resulting in the formation of the Seventh Day Adventist Reform Movement.

In 1915, the worldwide church leadership condemned Conradi's decision, stating that "the church is opposed to all violence", allowing Adventist participation in military actions primarily in medical services. This stance was reaffirmed in 1920 and 1922, with Conradi deemed to have failed as a church leader.

=== Nazi era ===
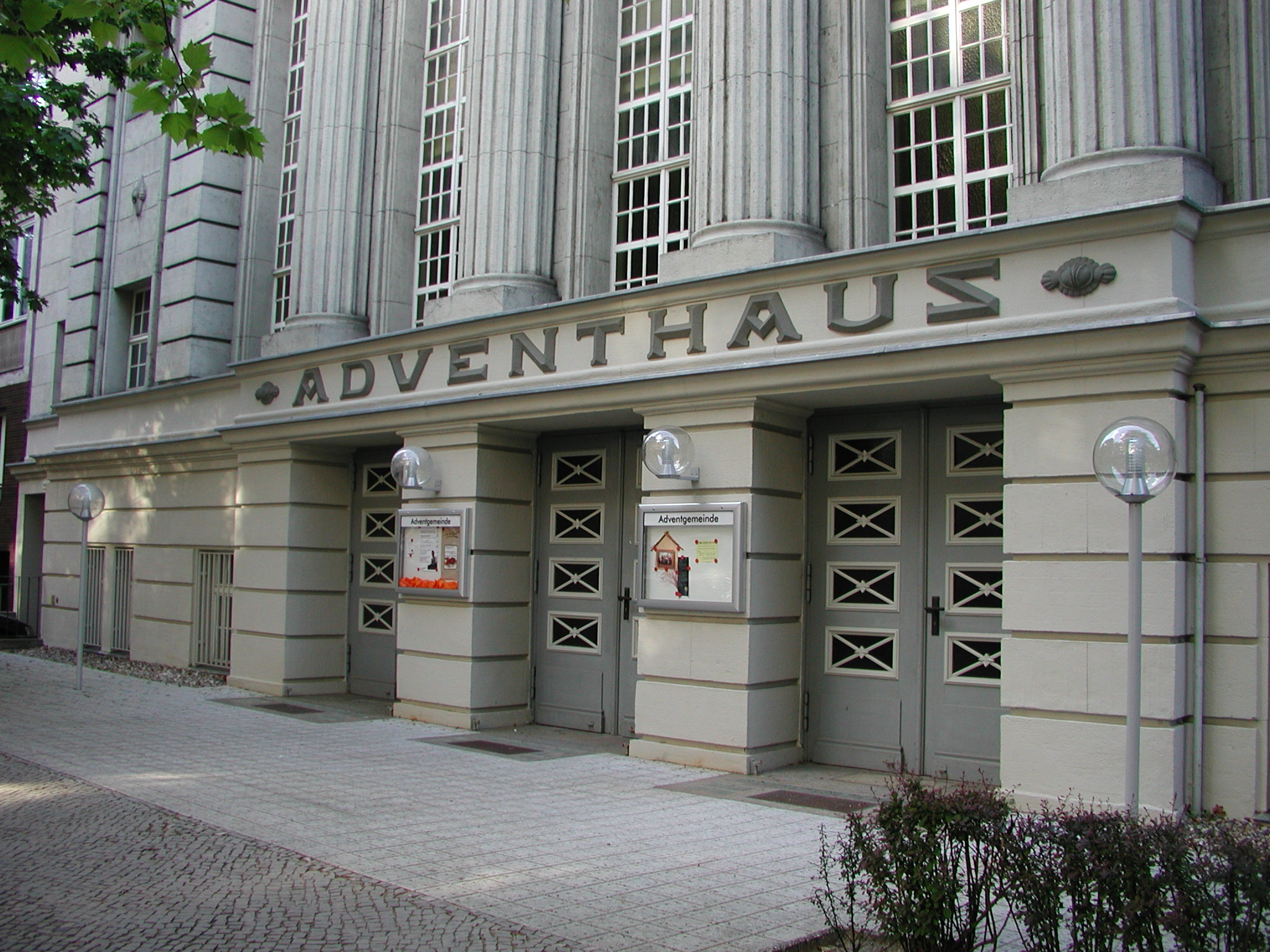
Adventist house in Wilmersdorf

The rise of Adolf Hitler was enthusiastically welcomed by Adventist leaders. Adolf Minck saw it as a refreshing spirit of reformation. Richard Müller regarded Hitler as God's chosen, praising his avoidance of alcohol, nicotine, and vegetarian lifestyle. In the 1930s, Adventists supported Hitler, believing he guaranteed religious freedom. In Friedensau, a town with a high Adventist population, 99.9% voted for the Nazis in parliamentary elections. Hitler's popularity among Adventists was partly due to his vegetarianism and abstinence from alcohol, coffee, and tea. Adventist Zdravko Plantak suggests support for Hitler stemmed from a lack of access to reliable information. On 26 November 1933, the Third Reich banned Adventists and other small churches, but two weeks later, Adventists were re-legalized as a "positive" denomination. On 29 April 1936, the state banned the Reform Adventists. Soon after, Adventist leaders issued a directive prohibiting members from contacting Reform Adventists. Zdravko Plantak states that under Nazi orders, Adventists of Jewish descent were expelled from the church, and members were forbidden from aiding them. However, Corrie Schroder notes that some Adventists secretly helped Jews.

Both German and Austrian Adventists supported the Anschluss. In 1938, to remove Jewish terminology, "Sabbath school" was changed to "Bible school", and "Sabbath" to "day of rest". Adventist publications did not protest against eugenics or euthanasia.

During the war, the state generally allowed Adventists to operate, with some exceptions. On 24 January 1941, the church was banned in Upper Silesia, on 4 April 1941 in Gdańsk and West Prussia, and on 9 May 1941 in Lower Silesia. The church repeatedly petitioned for permission to resume activities, without success. Services were held in members' private homes.

According to 1943 data, 5,993 Adventists were conscripted into the Wehrmacht, including 259 pastors and 1,844 "sympathizers". Only 754 (about 12%) served in medical services. After the war, Minck claimed about 95% of pastors in the Wehrmacht served in medical or administrative roles. By 1943, 1,957 Adventists received military honors, and 550 died in combat. They were likely the most decorated religious group at the time. Exact statistics after 1943 are unknown. Overall, about 3,030 Adventists (military and civilian casualties) died during World War II.

James Lamar McElhany, president of the General Conference of Seventh-day Adventists, demanded in a letter to Adolf Minck in April 1947 that the church leadership be purged of Nazi elements. However, by May 1948, Major J. C. Thompson noted that Adventists were among the few churches that had not yet undergone denazification. Post-war church leaders claimed their Nazi-era policies were motivated by a desire to ensure the church's survival. Corrie Schroder argued they acted to save themselves. Scholars agree that before Hitler's rise, preserving the Sabbath was the primary concern for German Adventists, and religious freedom was understood mainly as the ability to observe the Sabbath.

In 2005, Adventist leaders from Germany and Austria issued a joint statement expressing deep regret for supporting Nazism. Daniel Heinz, director of the Adventist archives in Friedensau, stated: "Church leaders even adopted some anti-Semitic ideology from the Nazis; in some cases, they did more than necessary to please (Nazi) authorities. This is truly strange for us".

== Statistics ==
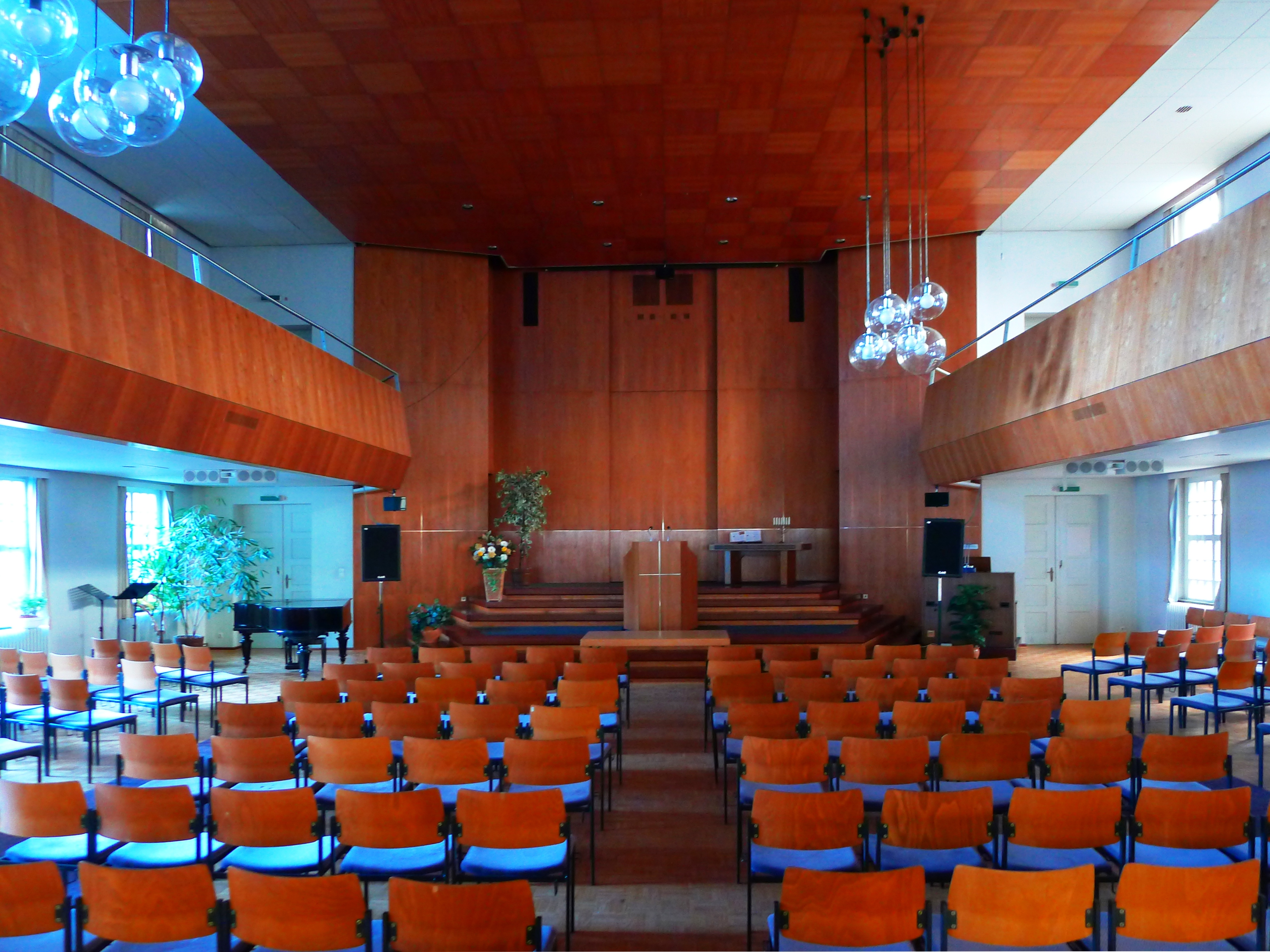
Berlin-Wilmersdorf

In 1901, Germany had 1,959 Adventist members in 3 conferences and 63 congregations.

In 1933, there were 36,278 Adventists in Germany; by the outbreak of World War II, this number was 38,323, an increase of 2,045, attributed to a 1934 missionary program. After 1945 border shifts and the loss of territories to Poland and the Soviet Union, 16,468 Adventists were outside Germany's borders. On 1 January 1946, the three German unions had 26,891 members in 653 congregations, served by 280 clergy.

Since the late 1990s, membership has slightly declined. In 1999, the church had 35,599 baptized adults and 11,300 children in 569 congregations, served by 360 pastors. In 2012, there were 34,982 baptized adults in 563 congregations.

In 2017, there were 34,348 baptized adults in 558 congregations.

== See also ==
- Seventh-day Adventist Church
- Seventh-day Adventist Church in Poland
- Protestantism in Brazil
- International Missionary Society
