= Gilbert Hottois =

Belgian professor of philosophy (1946–2019)

Gilbert Hottois (29 March 1946 – 16 March 2019) was a Belgian professor of philosophy at the Université libre de Bruxelles who specialised in Bioethics.

Hottois was born in Brussels. His positions included:

- Vice-Président of the Association des Sociétés de Philosophie de Langue Française (ASPLF) (2002–);
- Member of the advisory board of " Utopean studies " (St Louis, Miss., USA);
- President of the Société Belge de Philosophie (1990–1993);
- Founder member and vice-président (1990–) of the Société pour la philosophie de la technique (Paris); Président (1997–1999);
- Member of the Académie Royale des Sciences, des Lettres et des Beaux-Arts de Belgique (2003–);

He was chair of the programme committee of the 2008 World Congress of Philosophy

== Publications ==
He published over 25 sole-authored books and numerous co-authored books and papers.

=== Single-authored books ===
- Hottois G., La science entre valeurs modernes et postmodernité, Paris, Vrin, 2005;
- Hottois G., Qu'est-ce que la bioéthique?, Paris, Vrin (Chemins philosophiques), 2004, 125 pages.
- Hottois G., Philosophies des sciences, philosophies des techniques, sous l'égide du Collège de France, Paris, Odile Jacob, 2004.
- Wetenschappelijke en bio-ethische praktijken (avec I. Stengers), Budel, Damon, 2003, 96 pages.
- Species Technica, Paris, Vrin, 2002, 348 pages - a science-fiction novel written in 1981
- Technoscience et Sagesse ?, Nantes, Ed. Pleins Feux, 2002, 58 pages.
- Essais de philosophie bioéthique et biopolitique, Vrin, 1999, 189 pages (trad. en japonais).
- La philosophie des technosciences, Presses des Universités de Côte d'Ivoire, Abidjan, 1997, 105 pages.
- De la Renaissance à la Postmodernité. Une histoire de la philosophie moderne et contemporaine, Bruxelles, De Boeck, 1997 (3è éd., 2001, 560 pages) (trad. en espagnol).
- Entre symboles et technosciences. Un itinéraire philosophique, Seyssel (Paris), Champ Vallon (PUF), 1996, 266 pages (trad. en néerlandais).
- G. Simondon et la philosophie de la "culture technique", Bruxelles, De Boeck, 1993, 140 pages.
- Le paradigme bioéthique (Une éthique pour la technoscience), Bruxelles-Montréal, De Boeck-Erpi, 1990, 216 pages (trad. en italien, espagnol et portugais).
- Penser la logique, Bruxelles, De Boeck, 1989, 273 pages (2è édit. 2002, 214 pages) (trad. en portugais).
- Du "sens commun" à la "société de communication". Etudes de philosophie du language, Paris, Vrin, 1989, 222 pages.
- Le signe et la technique (La philosophie à l'épreuve de la technique) (préface de J. Ellul), Paris, Aubier, 1984, 220 pages (trad. en italien).
- Pour une éthique dans un univers technicien, Ed. de l'Université de Bruxelles, 1984, 106 pages.
- Pour une métaphilosophie du language, Paris, Vrin, 1981, 170 pages.
- L'inflation du language dans la philosophie contemporaine (préface de J. Ladrière), Editions de l'Université de Bruxelles, 1979, 390 pages.
- La philosophie du language de L. Wittgenstein (préface de J. Bouveresse), Editions de l'Université de Bruxelles, 1976, 220 pages.
