= Alan M. Olson =

American philosopher (1939–2023)

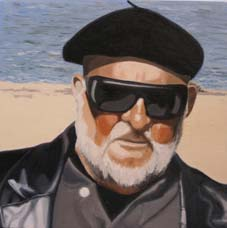
- Born: January 7, 1939; Minneapolis, Minnesota, U.S.
- Died: September 14, 2023; Orleans, Massachusetts, U.S.

Philosophical work
- Era: 20th-century philosophy/21st-century philosophy,
- Region: Western philosophy
- School: Continental philosophy
- Main interests: Philosophy of Religion, German Idealism, Philosophical Theology, Existentialism, Phenomenology, Hermeneutics
- Notable ideas: Jaspers and Cross-cultural Hermeneutics, Hegel and Pneumatology

Alan M. Olson (January 7, 1939 – September 14, 2023) was an American-French professor of the Philosophy of Religion, emeritus, at Boston University. He received his degrees from Saint Olaf College (BA, History and Philosophy), Luther Theological Seminary (M.Div., Theology), Nashotah House, where he studied with Arthur Anton Vogel, and Boston University (Ph.D.) where he studied with Peter Anthony Bertocci, Erazim Kohak, Harold H. Oliver and John N. Findlay. He served as Chairman of the Religion Department at Boston University, 1980–1987, and Chairman of the Philosophy Department, ad interim, 1987–1989. During the 1970s he was Program Coordinator of the Boston University Institute for Philosophy and Religion; and was executive director of the Twentieth World Congress of Philosophy in Boston, 1998. He was a Senior Fulbright Research Fellow at University of Tübingen, Germany, in 1986, where he studied with Klaus Hartmann; and a Senior Fulbright Research Fellow and visiting fellow at the Institut für die Wissenschaften vom Menschen, Vienna, Austria, in 1995, where he worked with Krzysztof Michalski. He served on the Board of Officers of the American Philosophical Association, 2000–2003; and was past president of the Karl Jaspers Society of North America. He delivered the Jaspers Lectures at university college, Oxford in 1989; and was co-editor, with Helmut Wautischer, of the philosophical journal, Existenz from 2006 to 2015. He lived on Cape Cod with his wife, Janet L. Olson, professor emerita, College of Fine Arts, Boston University. He is survived by Janet and their two daughters, Maren Kirsten and Sonja Astrid, and one grandson, Søren. Olson died on September 14, 2023, at the age of 85.

== Books and Edited Works ==
- Transcendence and Hermeneutics - ISBN 978-90-247-2092-7
- The Seeing Eye, Co-Author - ISBN 0-271-00291-3
- Hegel and the Spirit - ISBN 0-691-07411-9
- Disguises of the Demonic, Ed. - ISBN 0-8096-1896-6
- Myth, Symbol, and Reality, Ed. - ISBN 0-268-01346-2
- Transcendence and the Sacred, Co-Ed. - ISBN 0-268-01841-3
- Heidegger and Jaspers, Ed. - ISBN 1-56639-115-6
- Video Icons & Values, Co-Ed. - ISBN 0-7914-0412-9
- Educating for Democracy, Co-Ed. - ISBN 0-7425-3540-1
- Proceedings of the Twentieth World Congress of Philosophy, 12 Vols., Exec. Ed. - ISBN 1-889680-19-2
- Philosophical Faith and the Future of Humanity, Co-Ed, - ISBN 978-94-007-2222-4
