= İoanna Kuçuradi =

Turkish academic and philosopher (1936–2026)

Ioanna Kuçuradi
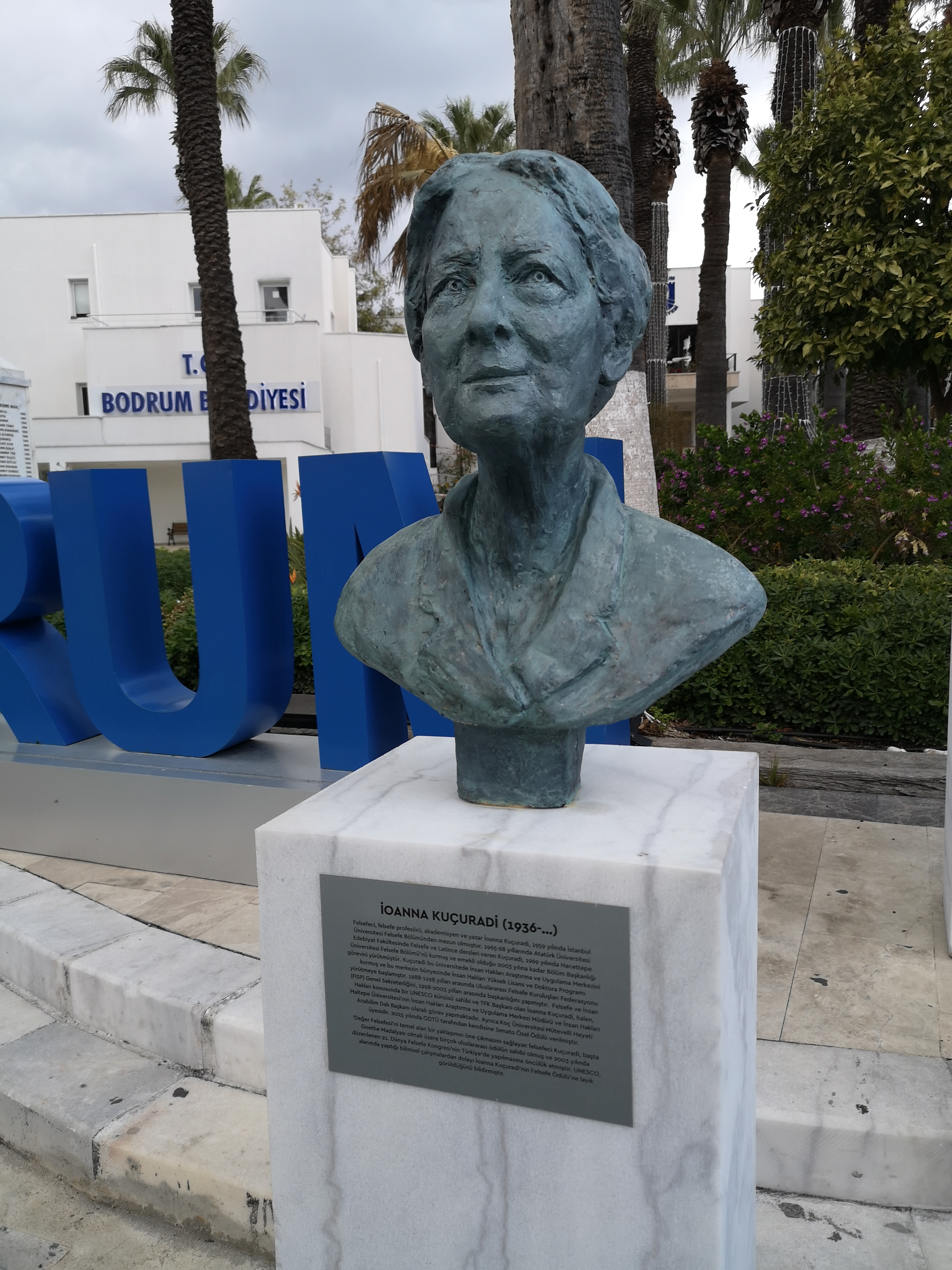
- Bust of Kuçuradi in Bodrum, Muğla Province, Turkey
- Born: 4 October 1936; Istanbul, Turkey
- Died: 2 October 2026 (aged 89); Maltepe, Istanbul, Turkey
- Resting place: Şişli Greek Orthodox Cemetery
- Education: Istanbul University
- Occupation: Philosopher

İoanna Kuçuradi (Greek: Ιωάννα Κουτσουράδη, Ioanna Koutsouradi; 4 October 1936 – 2 October 2026) was a Turkish philosopher of Greek descent from Istanbul. She was the president of the Philosophical Society of Turkey and a full-time academic of Maltepe University and member of the board of trustees at Koç University.

== Life and career ==
Kuçuradi was born in Istanbul, Turkey on 4 October 1936, to a family of Greek descent. After finishing Zappeion Greek Gymnasium for Girls in Istanbul in 1954, she studied philosophy at Istanbul University, from where she graduated with a B.A. degree in 1959. She earned a Ph.D. degree at the same university in 1965. İoanna Kuçuradi worked as an assistant professor at her alma mater and the Atatürk University in Erzurum.

In 1968, she joined Hacettepe University, Ankara, where she founded and chaired the Department of Philosophy until 2005. From 1997 to 2005, Kuçuradi was the founding director of the Centre for Research and Application of the Philosophy of Human Rights at Hacettepe University and Director of the M.A. and Ph.D. programmes of human rights. She was also a holder of a UNESCO Chair of Philosophy from 1998. From 2006 to her death, Kuçuradi taught philosophy and acted as director of the Centre for Research and Application of Human Rights at Maltepe University.

She was a member of several associations and bodies, among which are the Philosophical Society of Turkey (Founding member, Secretary-General between 1974–1980 and from 1980 as President), the Afro-Asian Philosophy Association (President from 2010), the International Federation of Philosophical Societies (FISP, member of the Steering Committee from 1983, General-Secretary between 1988–1998, President between 1998–2003, former President between 2003–2008 and from 2008 to her death Honorary President), the High Advisory Council for Human Rights of the Prime Ministry of Turkey (Chairperson, 1994–1996), the International Institute of Philosophy, Paris (President between 2014–2017 and until her death, Honorary President), the National Advisory Council for Human Rights of Turkey (2002–2005), the European Monitoring Centre on Racism and Xenophobia, Vienna (Observer, 2004–2007) and the Turkish National Committee of the UN Decade for Human Rights Education (Chair, 1997–2005).

Kuçuradi died in Istanbul on 2 October 2026, two days before her 90th birthday. She was buried at Şişli Greek Orthodox Cemetery on her 90th birthday.

== Honours ==
Kuçuradi received numerous honours, among which:

- Goethe-Medaille (1996)
- Doctor honoris causa, University of Crete, Greece (1996)
- Turkish Academy of Sciences Prize (1996)
- Hacettepe University Prize for Scientific Achievement (1994-1995 and 1995–1996)
- Doctor honoris causa, Ricardo Palma University, Lima, Peru (2000)
- Freedom of the Press 1999 Prize of the Journalists Association of Turkey (2000)
- Knight Commander of the Order of Merit of Germany (German: Grosses Verdienstkreuz des Verdienstordens der Bundesrepublik Deutschland) (2001)
- Honourable Mention, UNESCO Human Rights Education Prize (2002)
- Huésped Ilustra de la Ciudad de La Habana (2002)
- METU Parlar Foundation Science Award, Ankara, Turkey (2003)
- UNESCO Aristotle Medaille (2003)
- Diyarbakır Medical Association's Prize for Peace, Friendship and Democracy (2004)
- Council of Secular Humanism's Planetary Humanist Philosopher's Award (2005)
- Honorary Fellow, The Science Academy Society of Turkey, Istanbul (2015)
