= Deism in England and France in the 18th century =

Deism, the religious attitude typical of the Enlightenment, especially in France and England, holds that the only way the existence of God can be proven is to combine the application of reason with observation of the world. A Deist is defined as "One who believes in the existence of a God or Supreme Being but denies revealed religion, basing his belief on the light of nature and reason." Deism was often synonymous with so-called natural religion because its principles are drawn from nature and human reasoning. In contrast to Deism there are many cultural religions or revealed religions, such as Judaism, Trinitarian Christianity, Islam, Buddhism, and others, which believe in supernatural intervention of God in the world; while Deism denies any supernatural intervention and emphasizes that the world is operated by natural laws of the Supreme Being.

C. J. Betts argues that Deism was never a religion in the usual sense. It was a religion for individuals, especially the educated laity, and was most often presented as the result of the individual's unaided reflections on God and man. Deism is a religious attitude based on the belief in God and rejecting Christian belief, either implicitly or explicitly.

== Definitions and distinctions ==
The advantage of giving a standard definition of 'Deism' is to distinguish it from Christianity on the one hand and atheism on the other hand. Robert Corfe argues since deism is not organized as a church, and because it teaches self-reliance and to question authority through its intrinsic characteristics, it has little inclination to move toward the status of a highly organized body. So, it is not surprising that deism is often misunderstood and misinterpreted, even by those in academia.

The most common false perception concerning the reality of Deism is the assumption that Deism equals atheism. This misunderstanding of Deism is not a contemporary issue but it goes back to the seventeenth century as J. M. Robertson explains: "Before deism came into English vogue, the names for unbelief were simply 'infidelity' and 'atheism'- e.g. Baxter's Unreasonableness of Infidelity (1655) ... Bishop Stillingfleet's Origines Sacrae deals chiefly with deistic views, but calls unbelievers in general 'atheists'... ". So, the term 'atheism' was used as a basis for rational critique before the term 'Deism' being used. But by the first half of the 18th century, when English Deism had explicitly become an intellectual movement, the term 'atheism' was only flung at Deism as a term of abuse. Anything breaking the bounds of heterodoxy was atheism in actuality.

At the beginning of the eighteenth century large numbers of individuals were in the process of detaching themselves from Christian belief and replacing it by a religious attitude in which the belief in God was independent of Church or Bible. Such a movement required an independent name which implies its own real nature, not just a name. However the invention of the words 'Deism' and 'Deist' goes back to the sixteenth century.

The first known use of the term deist was by Pierre Viret, a disciple of Calvin, in his Instruction chrétienne en la doctrine de la Loi et de l'Évangile, in Genoa (1564). Viret regarded it as an entirely new word which he claimed the Deists wished to put in opposition to atheism in avoiding the accusation of the latter. The emergence of the word in the mid-sixteenth century was mostly associated with ongoing recovery of works from antiquity. So, it is believed that Deists were humanists whose classical readings had detached them from Christian belief and who had invented a word to denote simply the belief in God. However, Betts argues that the accounts of Deists at Lyon suggest quite a different interpretation, namely that the origin of the term Deism lies in the anti-Trinitarian movement which was then an important phenomenon in the religious life of Europe. Using the word 'Deist' Verit was likely referring to a group of Lyonnaise anti-Trinitarians.

== The main qualities of deism ==
Corfe argues that since Deists have no theology, appointed priests or elders, and so no hierarchy in imposing any kind of authority, there is a wide differentiation of personal beliefs among its members. However, it is possible to depict a general sketch as a common acceptable system among Deists.

=== Dominance of reason ===
Deism is a rational-based attitude which affirms the existence of God through the use of reason as opposed to revelation or dogmatic instruction of revealed religions. Reason will be elevated over fear if the old conflicts between reason and religion would be solved.

=== Anti-Christian attitude / Anti-Trinitarian belief ===
Deists generally reject the Trinity, the incarnation, the divine origin and authority of the Bible, miracles, and supernatural forces. Deists believe in the Unitarian concept of God through the denial of the orthodox doctrines of the Trinity and the deity of Christ.

=== Free will ===
Deists believe that human beings have free will and have responsibility for choosing how they live in relation to natural laws that govern the world.

=== Universal and naturalistic nature ===
Deism is a religion representing universal features of human nature. This contributed to a tendency to define religion in naturalistic terms. Deism emphasizes natural revelation.

=== Anti-supernatural revelation ===
The Deistic arguments intended to eliminate the belief in a supernatural revelation through the criticism of the trustworthiness of the canon of the Scripture created by humans, as sources of final truth. Instead, Deists try to focus on what is obvious. Miracles do not occur.

=== Anti-clericalism ===
Deism attacks the character of the clergy to get rid of an authority.

=== God does not interfere in the world ===
Deism limits God's function to creation with no further involvement. Their concept of God is built on a mechanistic model. The world is operated by natural laws.

Generally, it is believed that Deism was largely a negative (critical) movement. John Orr distinguished Deists from theists by observing the positivism and negativism of Deism. It could be said that the critical work of Deists was more prominent than the positive aspects of it as it was the critical aspect of Deism that affected the atmosphere of the Enlightenment through attacking the Christian revelation.

== Scientific and philosophical background of Deism ==
From the 1730s there was an international cult of Newton and Locke. The view that while the 'propagandists of the Enlightenment were French, its patron saints and pioneers were British: Bacon, Newton and Locke had such splendid reputations on the continent that they quite overshadowed the revolutionary ideas of a Descartes or a Fontenelle'. Deism received indirect support from the physics of Isaac Newton and the philosophy of John Locke.

=== The scientific basis of Deism ===
Deism owed its growing intellectual acceptance in part to the success of the Newtonian mechanical view of the world. Newton was able to demonstrate that a vast range of observational data could be explained on the basis of a set of universal principles. Newton's successes in explaining terrestrial and celestial mechanics led to the rapid development of the idea that nature and the universe could be thought of as a great machine, operating according to fixed laws. This is often referred to as a "mechanistic worldview". The religious implication of this will be clear. The idea of the world as a machine immediately suggested the idea of design. Newton himself was supportive of this interpretation. The physical world, according to Newton, was explicable in terms of uniform natural laws that could be discovered by observation and formulated mathematically. By mastering these laws reason could explain cosmic events that had previously been ascribed to divine intervention. This system, Newton believed, had been designed and produced by an intelligent and powerful Creator. Close though he was to Deism, Newton differed from the strict Deists insofar as he invoked God as a special physical cause to keep the planets in stable orbits. He believed in biblical prophecies, but rejected the doctrines of the Trinity and Incarnation as irrational. The implications of Isaac Newton's physical theories of mechanics, which treated the universe as if it were a machine built by a creating god yet running on its own principles independent of the interference of the creating god encompassed much more than physical change and movement.

The philosophes of mid-eighteenth century France developed this mechanistic view of the universe into a radically revised version of Christianity, Deism. Drawing on Newton's description of the universe as a great clock built by the Creator and then set in motion, the Deists among the philosophes argued that everything—physical motion, human physiology, politics, society, economics—had its own set of rational principles established by God which could be understood by human beings solely by means of their reason. This meant that the workings of the human and physical worlds could be understood without having to bring religion, mysticism, or divinity into the explanation. The Deists were not atheists; they simply asserted that everything that concerned the physical and human universes could be comprehended independently of religious concerns or explanations.

=== Philosophical foundation of Deism ===
==== John Locke (1632–1704) ====
John Locke's ideas supplied an epistemological grounding for Deism, though he was not a Deist himself. John Orr emphasizes the influence of Locke upon the Deistic movement by dividing the periods of Deism into Pre-Lockean and Post-Lockean. Locke accepted the existence of God as the uncaused Necessary Being, eternal, and all-knowing. He also believed in Christian revelation but he held that reason should be the ultimate judge of all truth. Revealed truths, which rested on indirect proofs from reports in Scripture and tradition, were less certain than things known directly by reason. He rejected certain Christian doctrines such as the Trinity and the Incarnation, which in his judgment failed to meet the test of rational coherence. But, he regarded himself as a Christian because he accepted Jesus Christ as the Messiah foretold in biblical prophecy; he had no difficulty in admitting the miracles ascribed in the Bible to the prophets and to Jesus. His two works that influenced the rise of English Deism were An Essay Concerning Human Understanding (1689) and The Reasonableness of Christianity (1695). Locke led Deists to build an epistemology upon empirical foundations. John Toland and other English Deists were extremely influenced by his beliefs.

== English Deists ==
=== Edward Lord Herbert of Cherbury (1583–1648) ===
English Deism began with the ideas of Edward Lord Herbert of Cherbury in 1624. These ideas were adopted by Charles Blount in 1683 and 1695. Herbert's notion of natural religion and innate truths served as the grounds for English Deism until its decline in the middle of the eighteenth century. John Locke provided a new epistemology for Deism based on empirical foundations while keeping an open mind to matters above reason.

In the seventeenth century an alternative position was put forward in England by Lord Herbert of Cherbury. He maintained that revelation was unnecessary because human reason was able to know all the truths requisite for salvation. In this list he included three primary truths: the existence of God, the moral law, and retribution in a future life. God, according to Lord Herbert, had implanted in the human soul from the beginning five innate religious ideas: the existence of God, divine worship, the practice of virtue, repentance for sin, and personal immortality.

=== John Toland (1670–1722) ===
Toland is best known for his famous work, Christianity not Mysterious, which was much influenced by John Locke's Essay Human Understanding. Embracing Locke's epistemology, Toland asserted reason is the "Foundation of all Certitude." Like Locke, he viewed reason as a mental faculty:

Every one experiences in himself a Power or Faculty of various Ideas or Perceptions of things: Of affirming or denying, according as he sees them to agree or disagree: And so of loving and desiring what seems good unto him; and of hating and avoiding what he thinks evil. The right Use of all these Faculties is what we call Common Sense, or Reason in general.

Toland employed the distinction between nominal and real essences to claim that God provided humanity the capacity to know only the nominal essences of the created world. This belief informed Toland's philosophy of nature. He argued that all parts of the universe were in motion. Additionally, motion was part of the definition of matter and was, therefore, an aspect of its nominal essence. No further knowledge of the creation was possible because the cause of motion was an unknowable real essence. Lockean and theological commitments explain Toland's peculiar reading of Isaac Newton's Principia Mathematica, which has long attracted interest from historians of science. A theological motivation for Toland's worldview sheds new light on the underlying assumptions of his natural philosophy and on English Deism more generally.

Indeed, it was Toland who invented the word, 'pantheist', and it was quickly taken up by his associates writing in French but living in the Netherlands. In contrast to the providentialism and, in some cases, the Deism of the moderate, Newtonian Enlightenment, the radicals postulated pantheism – or another commonplace term, materialism - and it horrified the liberal exponents of the new science who invariably brought their influence to bear against them. Eighteenth-century materialism had many origins and faces. One version, heavily indebted to a heretical reading of Descartes, emphasized the mechanical and self-moved properties of matter; another, that is here called pantheism, emphasized the vitalistic, spirit-in-matter qualities of nature and tended inevitably to deify the material order. The name to be most obviously associated with the deification of nature is of course, Baruch de Spinoza, resident until his death in 1677 in Amsterdam. With debts to both Toland and Spinoza, the latter philosophy belonged to the radical coterie whose history we are tracing.

=== Anthony Collins (1676–1729) ===
Collins's first book An Essay Concerning the Use of Reason was published in 1707. The main thrust of the book is to reject religious mysteries. Collins starts his approach to the issues of religion and reason along the same lines that Locke does. He defines reason as "that faculty of the Mind, whereby it perceives the truth, Falsehood, Probability or Improbability of Propositions". Thus he accepts Locke's definition of knowledge. He also distinguishes in the way Locke does intuitive, demonstrative and probable truths, and treats claims about revelation as probable propositions that largely derive from testimony. Perhaps one diversion from Locke is that Collins distinguishes between two different kinds of probability. The stronger kind resembles demonstration but the connection between ideas is merely probable. The weaker kind of probability is testimony. Collins' position is that a person is not expected to believe anything that is not comprehensible by the human intellect.

== French Deists ==
French thought from the Renaissance to the Enlightenment is considered to have been permeated with anti-religious views that began as deism in the sixteenth century by Pierre Viret and culminated as atheism in the eighteenth century by Voltaire and Rousseau.

French Deism was anti-religious and shaded into atheism, pantheism, and skepticism. France had its own tradition of religious skepticism and natural theology. The first French deist writers share few social characteristics. Most of them are educated laymen. Gilbert was a provincial lawyer, Lahontan an aristocratic adventurer, and the Militaire philosophe a professional soldier; at the social level there seem to be no connecting link. Most of the early works of French deism written before 1715 are among clandestine manuscripts. There are three common factors of these early works, as Betts explains: the experiences of travel, divisions within Christianity, and the idea of natural religion. The continuing influence of Cartesian thought reinforces the last factor. Natural religion had been combined with Cartesianism in large number of rationalist but Christian works, and in writers such as Gilbert and the Militaire philosophe this combination accounts for the positive side of their deism. Gueudeville, Lahontan and the Militaire philosophe all traveled and witnessed and experienced the conflicts produced by dogmatic intolerance backed by the resources of the nation-state. After 1715, the early works of Montesquieu and Voltaire represent both a conclusion of this first period of French deism and the beginning of the Enlightenment.

=== Militaire philosophe (born in 1660s) ===
Among the many clandestine writings of the early eighteenth century Diffcultés sur la religion proposées au père Malebranche written by an unidentified army officer in 1710, is one of the most impressive achievements in the history of deism. The author has read Malebranche's Recherche de la verite and turned its rationalism against Christian apologetics, attacking all the arguments devised by Malebranche and many others to prove the truth of Christianity. The work's final part expounds a complete system of deism in which God is transcendent justice. Militaire philosophe's system of constructive deism was welcomed by Voltaire.

The deistic writings which date from before 1700 must be regarded as isolated precursors, and that the books so often regarded as the earliest works of the Enlightenment, Montesquieu's Persian Letters and Voltaire's Lettres philosophiques, were written when the first phase of French deism had come and gone.

=== Simon Tyssot de Patot (1655–1738) ===
In Voyages et Aventures de Jacques Massé published in 1714, Simon Tyssot de Patot dispatched his heroes to a fictional country located near South Africa.

=== Jean Meslier (1664–1729) ===
Jean Meslier, the writer of Memoire, composed the first atheistic manifesto in modern European times. Voltaire published selections to support the deist cause and d'Holbach published the text in its entirety.

=== Julien Offray de La Mettrie (1709–1751) ===
La Mettire was a French physician and philosopher, and an early exponent of French materialism. La Mettrie is chiefly famous for his work L'homme machine (Man a Machine, 1747) in which he espoused a thoroughgoing materialist account of human nature. La Mettrie defended a purely pleasure-based view of the proper end of human life, and advocated atheism as the only means of liberating human beings from the various forms of oppression which stand in the way of human progress.

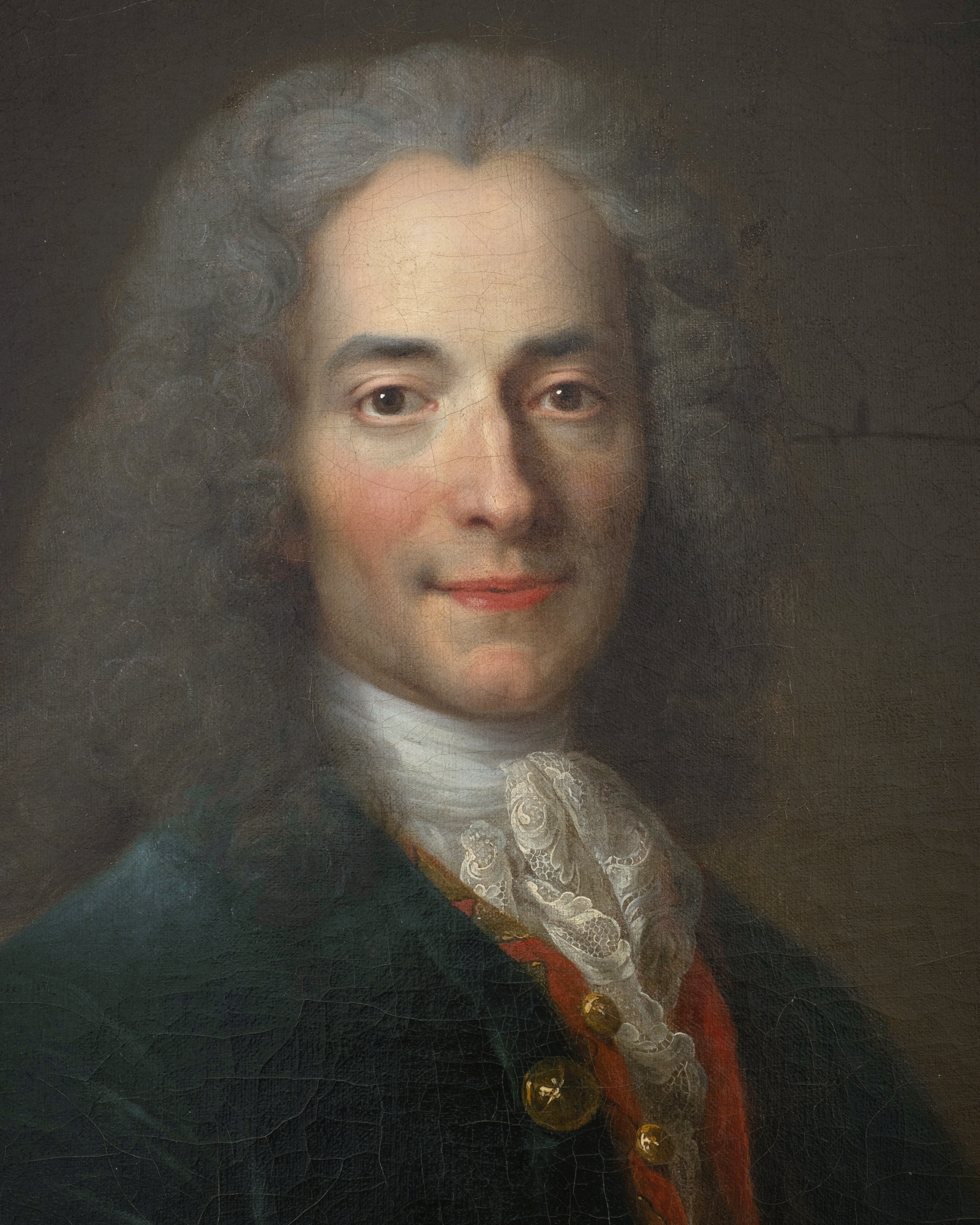
Voltaire

=== Voltaire (1694–1778) ===
Voltaire's deism is best summarized in his Traité sur la Tolerance, the Dictionaire Philosophique, and Lettres Philosophiques. His conviction was that if God did not exist, it would be necessary to invent him and his conviction fits nicely with the contemporary view of psychology in explaining the need for religion even in an enlightened world. Voltaire attacked faith in a Christian God and the superstitions in the teachings of the Catholic Church, raising an element of doubt over many old practices of the Judeo-Christian tradition. He attempted to convince his readers that there were certain beliefs and teachings in Christianity which simply did not stand up to the test of reason. For Voltaire man could perceive God through the use of his human reason. Voltaire claimed that all men share a common, natural religion and that none of the formally established religions in this world can monopolize the truth concerning God or morality. As for moral behavior, it does not depend on Christian revelation or on clerical intermediary but on natural morality rooted in the conscience and reason of every man.

== Contemporary historiography ==
=== Peter Gay ===
Peter Gay gives a cogent account of deism. His book, Deism; an anthology, is a collection of English, French and American deists, Lord Herbert of Cherbury and Charles Blount, John Toland, Anthony Collins, Matthew Tindal and Thomas Woolston, Voltaire, Reimarus Thomas Paine, and Elihu Palmer. Professor Gay contributes an Introduction in which he presents his overall view of deism and sets it against its political, religious and philosophical background. He also provides biographical and descriptive notes to introduce each writer and a brief account of some of the main lines of attack developed by the opponents of deism. He argues that the secular Enlightenment, which was by no means dominated by deists, is the deists' rightful heir. In his view deism was not merely a radical Protestantism of an extreme kind but really was a complete break with Christianity: 'If it is true that the deists took only a single step, it is also true that the step they took was across an unbridgeable abyss.'

=== C. J. Betts ===
C. J. Betts's study of early deism in France is an intelligent study. Betts examines the prehistory of deism, from 1564 to 1670. He looks at "the later seventeenth century," from Saint-Evremond to Bayle and discusses the first French deists, authors of books and clandestine manuscripts written between 1700 and 1715. He also analyzes deistic ideas in the early works of Montesquieu and Voltaire. He argues that there was no fixed body of "deistic" thought before 1700, and it is often difficult to distinguish deism from theological rationalism and naturalism in general. He argues plausibly that irenic recoil from the fratricidal divisions and intolerance of Christendom contributed greatly to the formation of deism. He concludes that Montesquieu's and Voltaire's moral philosophies altered deistic expression far more than anything original in their "religious" criticisms or theological speculations. On all of these issues, and on a large number of minor topics of scholarly interest, he engages prior historical and literary studies with fairness. In his view rationalism in religion became the deistic philosophy that some historians associate it with the high Enlightenment.

=== Jonathan Israel ===
In Radical Enlightenment, Jonathan Israel presents a history of the European Enlightenment in the seventeenth and eighteenth centuries considering philosophical, political, and geographical complexity. The large-scale thesis of the work concerns the scope of the Enlightenment. The most traditional way of looking at the movement is to see it primarily as a French or English Phenomenon but Israel focuses on the philosophical and scientific developments in two countries in the seventeenth century. In terms of discussion about deism he indicates some radical fringe elements– atheists, freethinkers, democrats – and shows how they lead to the expansion of toleration and the advance of reason over faith.

=== G. R. Cragg ===
G. R. Cragg in his study Reason and Authority in the Eighteenth Century, explains how the rule of reason, Newtonian science and French neoclassicism led to the development of modern thought. He argues that while everyone was a religious rationalist, confident of proving Christianity by solid evidences, the real deists were few and scandalous. They were assured of a hearing in the tolerant atmosphere of post-Revolution England, and the orthodox welcomed the challenge to defend their religion with the weapons of logic and science. They reckoned without the bewildering problems of Biblical studies, and fell into confusions which delighted the mischief-makers. "Deism" as a positive Religion of Nature, based on a neo-classical surmise of the sameness of man and reason everywhere, the simplicity and eternality of moral rules was of little account. He shows how English deists like Toland and Tindal made their way into the minds of Voltaire and Diderot and thus into a larger place in history than they earned in their homeland.

== See also ==
- Atheism
- Deism
- Freethought
- Humanism
- Materialism
- Pantheism
- Radical Enlightenment
- Rationalism
- Secularism
