= Existenz (journal) =

- Discipline: Philosophy
- Language: English
- Edited by: Helmut Wautischer

Publication details
- History: 2006–present
- Publisher: Open Source (United States)
- Frequency: Biannual
- Open access: yes

Standard abbreviations
- ISO 4: Existenz

Indexing
- ISSN: 1932-1066
- OCLC no.: 69669109

Links
- Journal homepage; Tables of content, 2006-present

Existenz is an on-line biannual academic journal covering research in philosophy, religion, politics, and the arts. Established in 2006 by its founding editors Alan M. Olson and Helmut Wautischer and is sponsored by the Karl Jaspers Society of North America. Its title, Existenz, derives from an essential feature of the philosophy of Karl Jaspers, namely, the notion of mögliche Existenz or "possible self-being" for which Jaspers became famous as one of the world's leading existentialist philosophers in the 20th century.

The journal serves as a publication outlet for Jaspers scholarship, cooperates with various international Jaspers societies, including those in the United States, Japan, Poland, Germany, Austria, Italy, and Croatia, and also considers direct submissions of articles for online publication. Existenz is indexed by The Philosopher's Index and included in the EBSCO database.

== See also ==
- List of philosophy journals
- List of open access journals
