= International Federation of Philosophical Societies =

International learned society devoted to philosophy

- Abbreviation: FISP
- Formation: 1948; 77 years ago
- Website: www.fisp.org

The International Federation of Philosophical Societies (French: Fédération Internationale des Sociétés de Philosophie, FISP) is a world organization for learned societies in philosophy. Its member-societies arguably include every country where there is significant academic work in this field. Members also include philosophical institutions at regional and international levels.

FISP is the highest non-governmental world organization for philosophy. It sponsors the International Philosophy Olympiad and (every five years) the World Congress of Philosophy. The 25th World Congres Congress of Philosophy was held in Rome, Italy in August 2024. Previous World Congresses of Philosophy were held in Beijing (2018), Athens (2013), Seoul (2008), Istanbul (2003), and other cities in several countries. FISP is governed by an international board and steering committee, and its officers include prominent philosophers from various member countries. The current president is Heisook Kim and the general secretary is Jacob Dahl Rendtorff. Past presidents include Luca Scarantino, Dermot Moran, William L.McBride, Peter Kemp, Ioanna Kuçuradi, Evandro Agazzi, and Francisco Miró Quesada.

== History ==
FISP was established in August 1948 at the 10th International Congress of Philosophy in Amsterdam. The first president of FISP was the Dutch philosopher H. J. Pos, who had also been president of the Amsterdam congress. The first secretary general was Raymond Bayer, who had been Secrétaire général of the IXe Congrès International de Philosophie in Paris in 1937. FISP was established to contribute "to the development of professional relations between philosophers of all countries, freely and with mutual respect" and the organization remains committed to this goal.
