= World Congress of Philosophy =

Global meeting of philosophers

The World Congress of Philosophy (originally known as the International Congress of Philosophy) is a global meeting of philosophers held every five years under the auspices of the International Federation of Philosophical Societies (FISP). First organized in 1900, these events became firmly established after the Second World War. Each World Congress is sponsored by one of the member societies in a different country, which assumes responsibility for the organization of that Congress. The purpose of these events is to contribute to the development of professional relations between philosophers of all countries, promote philosophical education, and contribute to the impact of philosophical knowledge on global problems. The 24th World Congress of Philosophy was held in Beijing in August 2018. The 25th World Congress of Philosophy took place in Rome in August 2024.

== List of congresses ==
#	Date congress	Country	Host	Theme
1st	1900, 1 Aug – 5 Aug	Paris, France		
2nd	1904, 4 Sep – 8 Sep	Geneva, Switzerland		
3rd	1908, 31 Aug – 5 Sep	Heidelberg, Germany		
4th	1911, 5 Apr – 11 Apr	Bologna, Italy		
5th	1924, 5 May – 9 May	Naples, Italy		
6th	1926, 13 Sep – 17 Sep	Boston, United States		
7th	1930, 1 Sep – 6 Sep	Oxford, United Kingdom		
8th	1934, 2 Sep – 7 Sep	Prague, Czech Republic		
9th	1937, 31 Jul – 6 Aug	Paris, France		"Congrès Descartes", on the 3rd centenary of Discours de la Méthode
10th	1948, 11 Aug – 18 Aug	Amsterdam, Netherlands		
11th	1953, 20 Aug – 26 Aug	Brussels, Belgium		
12th	1958, 12 Sep – 18 Sep	Venice, Italy		
13th	1963, 7 Sep – 14 Sep	Mexico City, Mexico		
14th	1968, 2 Sep – 9 Sep	Vienna, Austria		
15th	1973, 17 Sep – 22 Sep	Varna, Bulgaria		Science, Technology, Man
16th	1978, 26 Aug – 2 Sep	Düsseldorf, Germany		
17th	1983, 21 Aug – 27 Aug	Montreal, Canada		Philosophy and Culture
18th	1988, 21 Aug – 27 Aug	Brighton, United Kingdom		The Philosophical Understanding of Human Beings
19th	1993, 22 Aug – 28 Aug	Moscow, Russia		Mankind at a Turning Point: Philosophical Perspectives
20th	1998, 10 Aug – 15 Aug	Boston, United States		Paideia: Philosophy Educating Humanity
21st	2003, 10 Aug – 17 Aug	Istanbul, Turkey	İoanna Kuçuradi Turkey	Philosophy Facing World Problems
22nd	2008, 30 Jul – 5 Aug	Seoul, South Korea	Peter Kemp Denmark	Rethinking Philosophy Today
23rd	2013, 4 Aug – 10 Aug	Athens, Greece	Konstantinos Boudouris Greece	Philosophy as Inquiry and Way of Life
24th	2018, 13 Aug – 20 Aug	Beijing, China		Learning To Be Human
25th	2024, 1 Aug – 8 Aug	Rome, Italy		Philosophy across Boundaries
26th	2028,	Tokyo, Japan	Japan	Philosophy as a Place for Open Dialogue

=== Overview ===
The first International Congress of Philosophy was held in Paris in 1900 on the occasion of the Universal Exhibition. Among the participants were Henri Bergson, Maurice Blondel, Moritz Cantor, Louis Couturat, Henri Poincaré, Giuseppe Peano and Bertrand Russell. The second International Congress took place in Geneva in 1904; the third was held in Heidelberg in 1908 (with Josiah Royce, Wilhelm Windelband and Benedetto Croce). The First World War interrupted the sequence of these events after the 4th International Congress in Bologna in 1911.

Thereafter these congresses were held in Naples (1924), Cambridge, US (1926), Oxford, UK (1930), Prague (1934), and Paris (1937). The next International Congress of Philosophy was held in 1948, and these events have been held every five years under FISP sponsorship ever since. Recent congresses have taken place in Brighton (1988), Moscow (1993), Boston (1998), Istanbul (2003), Seoul (2008), and Athens (2013). The event became known as the World Congress of Philosophy in 1973.

=== The 20th World Congress ===
Thousands of philosophers from dozens of countries participated in the week-long event in Boston sponsored by the International Federation of Philosophical Societies. An edited selection of the papers presented were published as The Proceedings of the Twentieth World Congress of Philosophy in twelve thematically organized volumes by the Philosophy Documentation Center, in cooperation with the Congress's American Organizing Committee. All papers are available online at the Paideia Archives. The topics of the volumes include:

1. Ethics;
2. Metaphysics;
3. Philosophy of Education;
4. Philosophies of Religion, Art, and Creativity;
5. Epistemology;
6. Analytic Philosophy & Logic;
7. Modern Philosophy;
8. Contemporary Philosophy;
9. Philosophy of Mind;
10. Philosophy of Science;
11. Social and Political Philosophy;
12. Intercultural Philosophy.

These Proceedings were edited by Jaakko Hintikka, Robert Cummings Neville, Ernest Sosa, and Alan M. Olson. Notable contributors include Pierre Aubenque, Evandro Agazzi, Karl-Otto Apel, Natalia Avtonomova, Arindam Chakrabarti, Chung-ying Cheng, Daniel Dennett, Fred Dretske, Jorge J.E. Gracia, Marjorie Grene, Adolf Grünbaum, Jaakko Hintikka, Ted Honderich, Ioanna Kucuradi, Hans Lenk, Alasdair MacIntyre, C. Ulises Moulines, W. V. Quine, Gunnar Skirbekk, Vyachevslav Stepin, P. F. Strawson, Olúfémi Táíwò, Georg Henrik von Wright, Linda Zagzebski, Ernesto Gustavo Edwards, and Alicia Mónica Pintus.

=== The 21st World Congress ===
The 21st World Congress was held in Istanbul August 10–17, 2003, and had the theme "Philosophy Facing World Problems". There were symposia on:

- Inequality, Poverty and Development: Philosophical Perspectives
- Violence, War and Peace
- Democracy and its Future: Citizenship and Civil Society
- Human Rights: Concepts, Problems and Prospects
- Philosophy in Turkey

Edited selections of the papers presented at this meeting were published by the Philosophical Society of Turkey. These Proceedings include the following 13 thematic volumes:

1. Ethics;
2. Social and Political Philosophy;
3. Human Rights;
4. Philosophy of Education;
5. Logic and Philosophy of Sciences;
6. Epistemology;
7. Philosophy and Culture(s);
8. Philosophy of Religion;
9. Philosophical Anthropology;
10. Ancient and Modern Philosophy;
11. Contemporary Philosophy;
12. Philosophical Trends in the 20th Century; and
13. Philosophy Facing World Problems.

The collections is accessible online in cooperation with the Philosophy Documentation Center.

=== The 22nd World Congress ===
The 22nd World Congress took place in Seoul, South Korea, from July 30 to August 5, 2008, at the Seoul National University. The main theme of the conference was "Rethinking Philosophy Today, and there were four plenary sessions:

- Rethinking Moral, Social and Political Philosophy: Democracy, Justice and Global Responsibility
- Rethinking Metaphysics and Aesthetics: Reality, Beauty and the Meaning of Life
- Rethinking Epistemology, Philosophy of Science and Technology: Knowledge and Culture
- Rethinking History of Philosophy and Comparative Philosophy: Traditions, Critique and Dialogue

The International Program Committee was chaired by Gilbert Hottois. Over 1,200 paper were presented at this Congress, and the Korean Philosophical Association published all of the contributed papers as an eBook in DVD format edited by Prof. Myung-Hyun Lee. This collection is notable for its inclusion of papers in the seven official languages of the congress: English, Russian, Chinese, Spanish, Korean, French, and German. It has also been made available online in cooperation with the Philosophy Documentation Center Invited papers were published separately as a special supplement to the Journal of Philosophical Research.

=== The 23rd World Congress ===
The 23rd World Congress took place in Athens, Greece, August 4–10, 2013, at the National and Kapodistrian University of Athens. The main theme of the conference was "Philosophy as inquiry and way of life", and there were four plenary sessions:

- Philosophical Method:

Chair: Evandro Agazzi (Italy/Mexico) Speakers: Souleymane Bachir Diagne (Senegal/US), Dagfinn Føllesdal (Norway), John McDowell (South Africa/United States)

- Philosophy and the Sciences:

Chair: Maria Carla Galavotti (Italy) Speakers: Susan Haack (US), Alberto Cordero (Peru/United States), Keiichi Noe (Japan)

- Philosophy as Practical Wisdom:

Chair: Juliana González (Mexico) Speakers: Alexander Nehamas (Greece/US), Chen Lai (China)

- Philosophy and Public Life:

Chair: Hans Lenk (Germany) Speakers: Seyla Benhabib (US), Abdussalam Guseinov (Russia), Abdolkarim Soroush (Iran)

A selection of invited papers from this Congress was published in 2015.

== Literature ==
- Lutz Geldsetzer, Bibliography of the International Congresses of Philosophy. Proceedings 1900-1978, München: Saur, 1978
- Rolf Elberfeld, 'Globale Wege der Philosophie im 20. Jahrhundert. Die Weltkongresse für Philosophie 1900–2008', in: Allgemeine Zeitschrift für Philosophie, 34.1 (2009)
- Giuseppe Bianco, "Le long et monotone chapelet de l'Esprit universel. Disciplinarisation et internationalisation dans les congrès de philosophie." Revue de métaphysique et de morale, 84.4 (2014), 483-497. https://doi.org/10.3917/rmm.144.0483.
