= John Oakes (apologist) =

- Occupations: Writer, public speaker
- Writing career
- Genre: Christian literature
- Subject: Christian apologetist
- Website: www.evidenceforchristianity.org

John Oakes is a Christian apologist and a professor of chemistry at Grossmont College. He belongs to the Restoration Movement of the Christian tradition.

== Biography ==
John Oakes earned his PhD in chemical physics from the University of Colorado in 1984. During his years at graduate school, he converted to Christianity and eventually worked as an intern for the Boulder Church of Christ in Boulder, Colorado. Between then and 2000, he worked at various colleges including Gonzaga University, UCSD, and Mesa College.

== Career ==
In 1999, he began writing books on apologetics, starting with Is There a God? Questions of Science and the Bible, which was designed to answer many of the questions raised by modern scientific discovery. In 2000, he published Daniel, Prophet to the Nations, which combines a discussion of the practical applications of the book of Daniel with a detailed analysis of the prophetic content in Daniel. His third book Reasons for Belief: A Handbook of Christian Evidences, was published in 2001 to encourage the faith of believers and to help create faith in non-believers.

Oakes is also the President of the Apologetics Research Society, a California non-profit corporation, which runs an apologetics website and organizes an annual apologetics conference. He often delivers talks on God, Science and the Bible; History, Archaeology and the Bible; Messianic Prophecies; Daniel, Prophet to the Nations; From Shadow to Reality; How We Got the Bible; Jesus: Man, Myth or Messiah?; The Bible, From God or Man?: The Problem of Pain and Suffering; Church History; Old Testament Survey; The Book of Hebrews; Response to The God Delusion; Christian World View; World Religions; Induction, Deduction and Revelation: Knowing God's Will; History of Baptism: Into Christ; and Eldership: Qualities or Qualifications?

== Works by Oakes ==
- Is There a God? Questions of Science and the Bible, Illumination Publishers International, Spring Texas, 1999.
- Daniel, Prophet to the Nations, Illumination Publishers International, Spring Texas, 2000.
- Reasons for Belief: A Handbook of Christian Evidences, Illumination Publishers International, Spring Texas, 2001.
- From Shadow to Reality, Illumination Publishers International, Spring Texas, 2005.
- That You May Believe, Illumination Publishers International, Spring Texas, 2007. (co-written with David Eastman)
- Field Manual for Christian Apologetics, Illumination Publishers International, Spring Texas, 2011.
- Mormonism: What Does the Evidence and Testimony Reveal?, Illumination Publishers International, Spring Texas, 2012. (co-written with Douglas Jacoby)
- The Christian Story (Finding the Church in Church History), Illumination Publishers International, Spring Texas, 2012.
- Golden Rule Membership, Illumination Publishers International, Spring Texas, 2014.
