= Bert Beverly Beach =

Swiss-born American theologian (1928–2022)

Bert Beverly Beach (15 June 1928 – 14 December 2022) was a Swiss-born American Adventist theologian, university teacher, author and philanthropist. He was Secretary General of the International Association for Religious Freedom in the 1990s.

== Early life and education ==
Beach was born to an American family in Gland, Switzerland, in 1928. His father was the Seventh-day Adventist Church administrator Walter Raymond Beach. Earning his B.A. from Pacific Union College in 1948, he spent the next year at Stanford University, and was then for a time a northern California elementary school principal, and then principal of Italian Junior College in Florence until 1958, when he was bestowed the degree of Ph.D. by the University of Paris. He taught history at Columbia Union College, attending Vatican II as an observer in the 1960s, and thereafter directed the education department of the Northern Europe-West Africa Division until 1975.

== Later life and death ==
After his theological studies he became a doctor of theology and taught at universities in different countries. He spoke six languages (including German), has worked as a teacher and lecturer in Italy, England and the United States and was a keynote speaker worldwide. From 1967, Beach was Secretary-General of the General Conference of the World Council of Churches in Geneva, where he was not able to initiate membership, but to work with Seventh-day Adventists. He was appointed a personal representative of the community in the Faith and Order commission. He was a member of the Christian Peace Conference, at whose All-Christian Peace Assembly he participated in 1971 in Prague. He became director of the Conference's Public Affairs and Religious Liberty Department in 1980.

Beach was Secretary General of the International Association for Religious Freedom until his retirement in 1995 (but thereafter continued advising the General Conference on religious liberty and interchurch relations) and was Secretary General of the Worldwide Christian Communities, a non-denominational organization of churches around the world, until 2003. In an interview in August 1995 with the newspaper Shabbat Shalom, he pleaded for a departure from all previously practiced prejudices and resentments towards other thinkers and believers. In February 2007, he spoke at the World Conference in Cape Town, South Africa on the relationship between faith and freedom. In particular, he considered the unfolding and deepening of Judeo-Christian dialogue to be a prerequisite for interreligious and interdenominational dialogue on the unfolding of faith in the spirit of freedom as a form of struggle for human dignity. He dealt with the variants of religious fundamentalism, which counteract humble human coexistence in the one humanity.

Beach died on 14 December 2022, at the age of 94.

== Writings ==
- So Much in Common (1973)
- Vatican II: Bridging the Abyss (1968)
- Ecumenism: Boon or Bane? (1974)
- A church for all Christians?, Advent-Verlag, Hamburg 1975
- So that they are all one, Union-Verlag (VOB) Berlin and the Seventh-day Adventist Church, Berlin 1977
- Pattern for Progress (1985)
- Bright Candle of Courage (1989)
- 101 Questions Adventists Ask, Advent-Verlag, Lüneburg 2000
- Brückenbauer, Advent-Verlag, Lüneburg 2013
