= Pandeism in Asia =

Theological doctrine in Asia

Pandeism (or pan-deism), a theological doctrine which combines aspects of pantheism into deism, and holds that the creator deity became the universe and ceased to exist as a separate and conscious entity, has been noted by various authors to encompass many religious beliefs found in Asia, with examples primarily being drawn from India and China.

== Pandeism in China ==
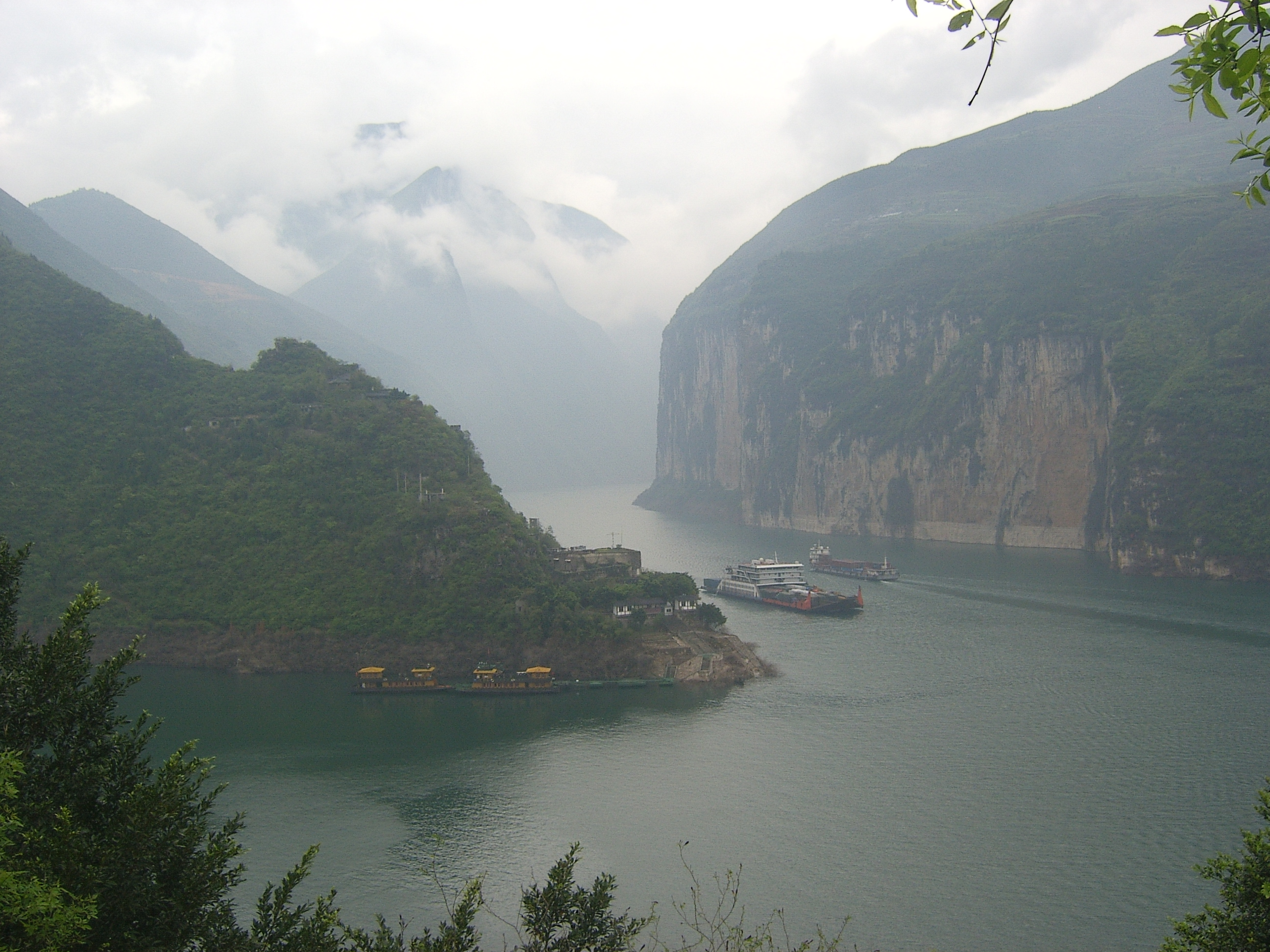
The Qutang Gorge along the Yangtze River, in the Three Gorges region.

Physicist and philosopher Max Bernhard Weinstein in his 1910 work Welt- und Lebensanschauungen, Hervorgegangen aus Religion, Philosophie und Naturerkenntnis ("World and Life Views, Emerging From Religion, Philosophy and Perception of Nature"), presented the broadest and most far-reaching examination of pandeism written up to that point. Weinstein found varieties of pandeism in the religious views held in China, especially with respect to Taoism as expressed by Lao-Tze.

Pandeism (in Chinese, 泛自然神论) was described by Wen Chi, in a Peking University lecture, as embodying "a major feature of Chinese philosophical thought," in that "there is a harmony between man and the divine, and they are equal." Zhang Dao Kui (张道葵) of the China Three Gorges University proposed that the art of China's Three Gorges area is influenced by "a representation of the romantic essence that is created when integrating rugged simplicity with the natural beauty spoken about by pandeism." Literary critic Wang Junkang (王俊康) has written that, in Chinese folk religion as conveyed in the early novels of noted folk writer Ye Mei (叶梅), "the romantic spirit of Pandeism can be seen everywhere." Wang Junkang additionally writes of Ye Mei's descriptions of "the worship of reproduction under Pandeism, as demonstrated in romantic songs sung by village people to show the strong impulse of vitality and humanity and the beauty of wildness." It has been noted that author Shen Congwen has attributed a kind of hysteria that "afflicts those young girls who commit suicide by jumping into caves-"luodong" 落洞" to "the repressive local military culture that imposes strict sexual codes on women and to the influence of pan-deism among Miao people," since "for a nymphomaniac, jumping into a cave leads to the ultimate union with the god of the cave" (the cave being a metaphor for death itself).

== Pandeism in India ==
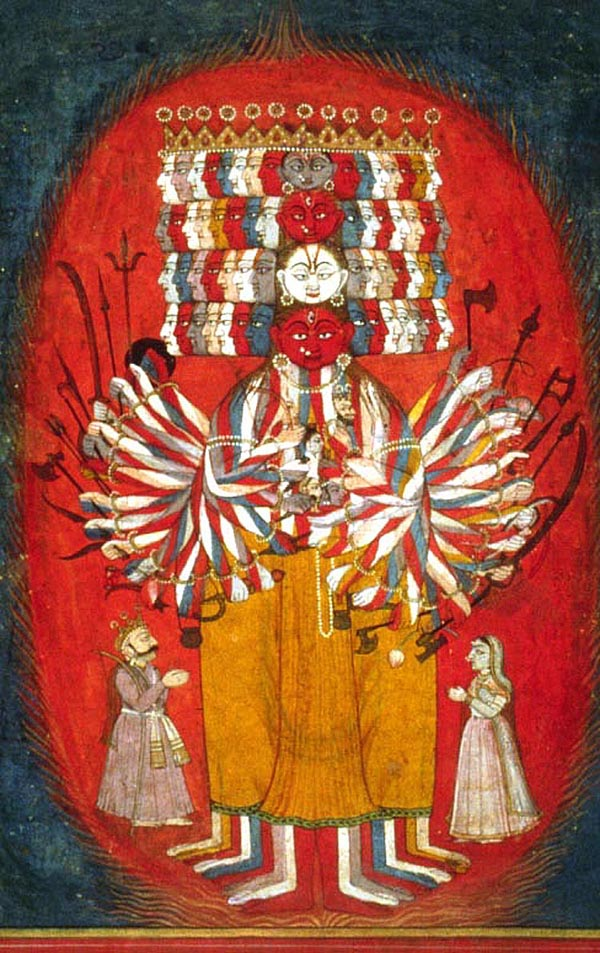
Krishna displays his Vishvarupa (Universal Form) to Arjuna on the battlefield of Kurukshetra (chapter 11).

In 1833, religionist Godfrey Higgins theorized in his Anacalypsis that "Pandeism was a doctrine, which had been received both by Buddhists and Brahmins." An 1853 article of the London Missionary Society in the Oxford Chronicle and Reading Gazette, reported that of the Hindus in India, "there was a more modern class who had adopted European Deistical ideas, but were more Pandeists than Deists". Likewise, in February 1877, an article titled "Native Honesty" published in The Bengal Times, criticizing certain White colonists for treating Indian people as equals and entrusting them with civic responsibilities, stated: "We must tell them and their disciples plainly that their professed love of the Native is a hollow sham. Their white-pandeism is merely a speculation to secure patronage". That same year, Peruvian scholar and historian Carlos Wiesse Portocarrero had written in an essay titled Philosophical Systems of India that in that country, "Metaphysics is pandeistic and degenerates into idealism."

In 1896, Italian historian Gustavo Uzielli described the world's population as influenced "by a superhuman idealism in Christianity, by an anti-human nihilism in Buddhism, and by an incipient but growing pandeism in Indian Brahmanism." But the following year, the Reverend Henry Grattan Guinness wrote critically that in India, "God is everything, and everything is God, and, therefore, everything may be adored. ... Her pan-deism is a pandemonium."

German physicist-philosopher Max Bernhard Weinstein also found Pandeism to be prevalent in India, especially in the Hindu Bhagavad Gita. In 2014, German political philosopher Jürgen Hartmann observed that Hindu pandeism (along with vegetarianism) has contributed to friction with monotheistic Islam. In 2019, Swiss thinker James B. Glattfelder wrote that "in Hinduism, the notion of lila is akin to the concept of pandeism". Within non-dualist philosophical schools of Indian philosophy, Lila is a way of describing all reality, including the cosmos, as the outcome of creative play by the divine absolute (Brahman). In the dualistic schools of Vaishnavism, Lila refers to the activities of God and his devotee, as well as the macrocosmic actions of the manifest universe, as seen in the Vaishnava scripture Srimad Bhagavatam, verse 3.26.4:

== Pandeism elsewhere in Asia ==
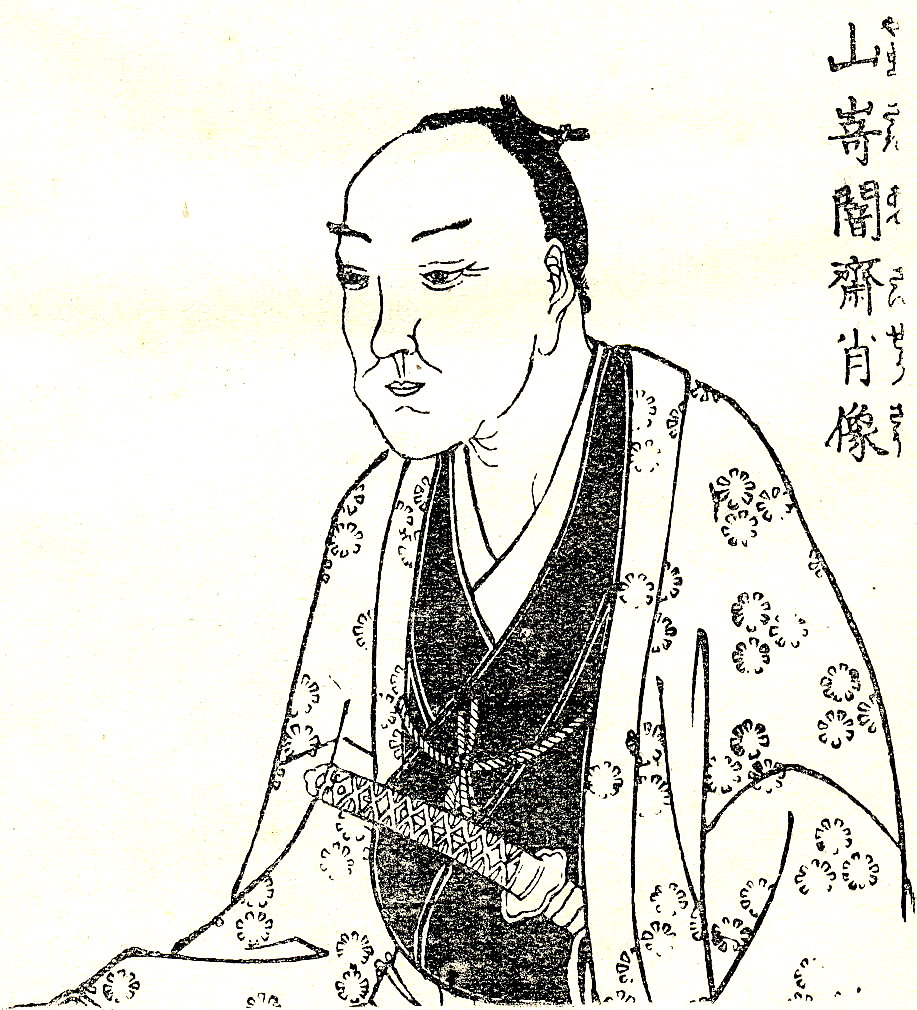
Yamazaki Ansai, identified by Max Bernhard Weinstein as a philosopher with ideas especially consonant with pandeism.

Weinstein similarly found the views of 17th century Japanese Neo-Confucian philosopher Yamazaki Ansai, who espoused a cosmology of universal mutual interconnectedness, to be especially consonant with pandeism. Because cosmologically everything was interconnected, Ansai believed that the actions of an individual (in a similar manner to modern chaos theory) affect the entire universe. He stressed the Confucian concept of Great Learning, in which a person's actions (the center of a series of concentric circles) extend outward toward the family, society, and finally to the cosmos.

Charles Anselm Bolton, a former Catholic priest who left the Catholic Church to teach Reformation doctrines, alluded to Pandeism in Asia in a 1963 article, Beyond the Ecumenical: Pan-deism?, published in Christianity Today, an Evangelical Christian magazine founded by the Reverend Billy Graham. In the article, Bolton addressed the role of Asia in the relationship between Christianity and pandeism, contending that the Catholic Church intended to use pandeism as a sort of umbrella belief system under which to bring religions of Asia toward Catholicism. Bolton notes that "To those familiar with the history of Roman Catholic missions in recent centuries, the idea of fraternization with oriental religions is not completely new," and that "to unite with Hindus and Buddhists, Christians should explore the hidden reality—the “ultimate reality,” the infinite, the absolute, the everlasting, the all-pervading spirit that marks the religious experience of the Orient."

== See also ==
- Lila (Hinduism)
- Tat Tvam Asi
