= Win Bigly =

2017 nonfiction book by Scott Adams

Win Bigly: Persuasion in a World Where Facts Don't Matter
- Author: Scott Adams
- Language: English
- Subject: Donald Trump, persuasion
- Genre: Non-fiction
- Publisher: Portfolio
- Publication date: October 31, 2017
- Publication place: United States
- Media type: Print, e-book
- Pages: 304 pp
- ISBN: 978-0735219717
- Preceded by: How to Fail at Almost Everything and Still Win Big: Kind of the Story of My Life, 2013
- Followed by: Loserthink: How Untrained Brains Are Ruining America, 2019

Win Bigly: Persuasion in a World Where Facts Don't Matter is a 2017 nonfiction book by Scott Adams, creator of Dilbert, and author of How to Fail at Almost Everything and Still Win Big. The book presents Adams's theory that Donald Trump's victory in the 2016 United States presidential election was due to Trump being a "master persuader" with a deep understanding of persuasion and the human mind.

In 2015, Adams publicly predicted Trump's victory. Adams later cited his training as a psychic and his research into the field of persuasion as the basis for his claim. He wrote Win Bigly to analyze Trump's tactics and offer guidance to improve readers' communication skills. He describes people who, like Trump, are skilled at convincing listeners as "master persuaders". He posits that when debating an issue, facts are only important when they can impact at an emotional level.

== Reception ==
Florida Today described the subject matter as "something of great value in today's media-saturated environment," and Publishers Weekly thought Win Bigly was "highly readable" and handled in a skillful and humorous manner. Politico found the book to be "an oxygen-free cubicle into which is piped a barking infomercial for the president." Win Bigly was a best-seller and brought increased attention to Adams' blog; Michel Schein of Forbes speculated that Adams exploited Trump's popularity to protect his career as the newspaper industry declined.

== Second edition ==
A second edition was published in 2024.

== See also ==
- Influencer
- Manipulation (psychology)
- Robert Cialdini
  - Influence: Science and Practice
