= Channel 2 (Posadas, Argentina) =

Canal 2
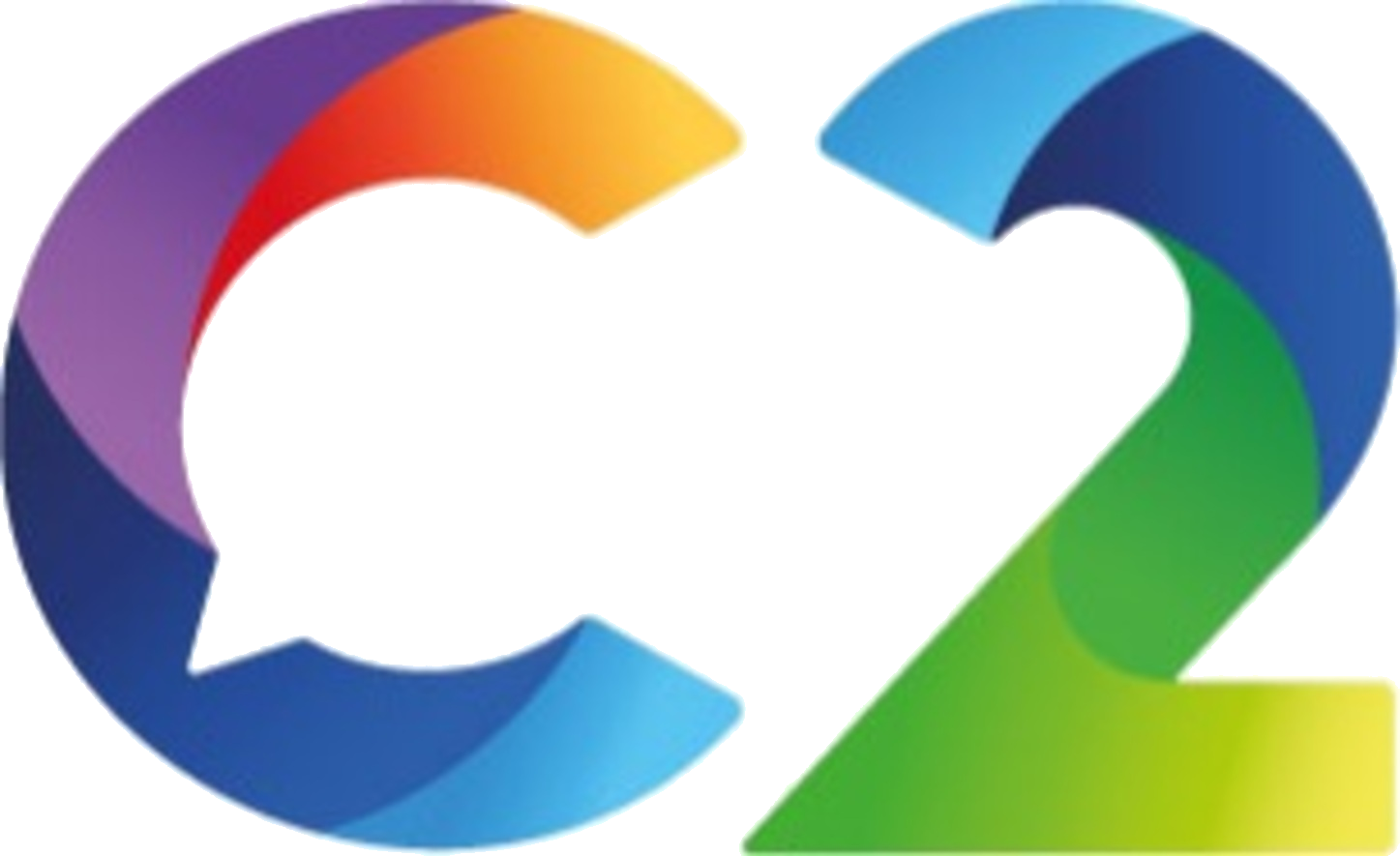
- Posadas, Misiones; Argentina
- City: (Argentina) Posadas, Misiones
- Channels: Analog: 2 (VHF); Digital: 35 (UHF)
- Branding: Canal 2

Programming
- Language: Spanish
- Affiliations: Telefe

Ownership
- Owner: La Verdad SRL; (Grupo La Verdad S.R.L.)

History
- Founded: 2007
- First air date: January 1, 2007

Technical information
- Licensing authority: ENACOM

Links
- Website: canal2misiones.com.ar

Channel 2 Posadas, is an Argentine television station broadcasting from Posadas, Misiones, to the entire province and, by extension, to border areas of Paraguay and Brazil. The station is owned by La Verdad SRL, and it has been privately affiliated with Telefe since 2011.

== History ==
Canal 2 started broadcasting on January 1, 2007. It was established the previous year by governor Carlos Rovira using a budget of millions of Argentine pesos, which was not properly disclosed due to lack of transparency.

Initially, the station relayed programs from Televisión Pública, Encuentro and Telesur.

In April 2007, petitions were made for Cablevisión Posadas to add the station; its cable slot would replace Crónica TV. The arrival was likely made after an agreement with the provincial electricity company upon the increase of the cost of the transport of the cables from 1 peso to 6.

On December 1, 2011, the station became a Telefe affiliate; while in 2019, it was added to the ARSAT-2 satellite to enable provincial coverage and digital terrestrial coverage. HD broadcasts started in mid-2022 and TDA broadcasts on July 5, 2023, on channel 35.1.

DTT coverage expanded in 2024 to Oberá (channel 19.1), Puerto Iguazú (channel 19.1) and 32.1 (Eldorado (channel 32.1).

== Programming ==
In addition to relaying Telefe's programs, it airs news service NC2 Noticias de la calle (weekdays at 13:00 and 20:00), La tele con vos (morning magazine) and La ofrenda (musical program).

== Relayers ==
Canal 2 has 11 relay stations in Misiones Province.

Misiones Province
Channel	'Location
32	Andresito
40	Apóstoles
34	Bernardo de Irigoyen
3	Campo Grande/Jardín América
32	Dos de Mayo
6	Eldorado
36	Leandro N. Alem
19	Oberá
19	Puerto Iguazú
41	San Francisco de Asís/Santa Rita
21	San Pedro
