= WAJ =

WAJ or waj can refer to:

- AirAsia Japan, Japanese low-cost airline
- Algeria Press Service, an Algerian news agency
- Waffa language, a Trans–New Guinea language spoken in Papua New Guinea, by ISO 639 code
- Water Authority of Jordan, responsible for water supply and sanitation in Jordan
- Wawoi Falls Airport, in Papua New Guinea; see List of airports by IATA airport code: W
- Windham-Ashland-Jewett Central School, a public K-12 school located in Windham, New York, U.S.
- Woman's Art Journal, a feminist art journal
