= Pandeism =

Belief that God created the universe by becoming it

Pandeism, or pan-deism, is a theological doctrine that combines aspects of pantheism with aspects of deism. Unlike classical deism, which holds that the creator deity does not interfere with the universe after its creation, pandeism holds that such an entity became the universe and ceased to exist as a separate entity. Pandeism (as it relates to deism) purports to explain why God would create a universe and then appear to abandon it, and pandeism (as it relates to pantheism) seeks to explain the origin and purpose of the universe.

Various theories suggest the coining of pandeism as early as the 1780s. One of the earliest unequivocal uses of the word with its present meaning was in 1859 with Moritz Lazarus and Heymann Steinthal.

== Definition ==
Pandeism is a hybrid blend of the root words pantheism and deism (Ancient Greek: πᾶν, romanized: pan, lit. 'all' and Latin: deus 'god'). The earliest use of pandeism appears to have been 1787, with another usage found in 1838, a first appearance in a dictionary in 1849 (in German as Pandeismus and Pandeistisch), and an 1859 usage of pandeism expressly in contrast to both pantheism and deism by philosophers and frequent collaborators Moritz Lazarus and Heymann Steinthal.

In his 1910 work Welt- und Lebensanschauungen, Hervorgegangen aus Religion, Philosophie und Naturerkenntnis ("World and Life Views, Emerging From Religion, Philosophy and Perception of Nature"), physicist and philosopher Max Bernhard Weinstein presented the broadest and most far-reaching examination of pandeism written up to that point. Weinstein noted the distinction between pantheism and pandeism, stating "even if only by a letter (d in place of th), we fundamentally differ Pandeism from Pantheism", indicating that the words, even if spelled similarly, have very different implications.

Some pantheists identify themselves as pandeists as well, to underscore that "they share with the deists the idea that God is not a personal God who desires to be worshipped". It has also been suggested that "many religions may classify themselves as pantheistic" but "fit more essentially under the description of panentheistic or pandeistic", or that "pandeism is seen as a middle path between pantheism and deism". Here it is noted as well that "some authors also distinguish 'panendeism', whereby only part of God becomes the universe".

Pandeism falls within the traditional hierarchy of monistic and nontheistic philosophies which address the nature of God. It is one of several subsets of deism: "Over time there have been other schools of thought formed under the umbrella of deism including Christian deism, belief in deistic principles coupled with the moral teachings of Jesus of Nazareth, and Pandeism, a belief that God became the entire universe and no longer exists as a separate being".

Bruner, Davenport and Norwine, alluding to Victorian scholar George Levine's suggestion that secularism can bring the "fullness" always promised by religion, observe that "for others, this 'fullness' is present in more religious-oriented pantheistic or pandeistic belief systems with, in the latter case, the inclusion of God as the ever unfolding expression of a complex universe with an identifiable beginning but no teleological direction necessarily present". They suggest that pandeism, within a general tendency of postmodernity, has the capacity to "fundamentally alter future geographies of mind and being by shifting the locus of causality from an exalted Godhead to the domain of Nature".

In the 2013 edition of their philosophy textbook, Doing Philosophy: An Introduction Through Thought Experiments, Theodore Schick and Lewis Vaughn define "pandeism" as "[t]he view that the universe is not only God but also a person". Travis Dumsday, in his 2024 Alternative Conceptions of the Spiritual, writes that the emergence of consciousness in panspiritism is what "distinguishes panspiritism from pandeism, since, according to the latter, the physical cosmos emerges (by a process of becoming) out of an ontologically prior divine conscious subject". He goes on to describe that in pandeism, "God became the universe at the big bang, and the resultant cosmos may (depending on the version of pandeism on offer) inherit some or all of His divine characteristics".

== Progression ==
=== Ancient world ===
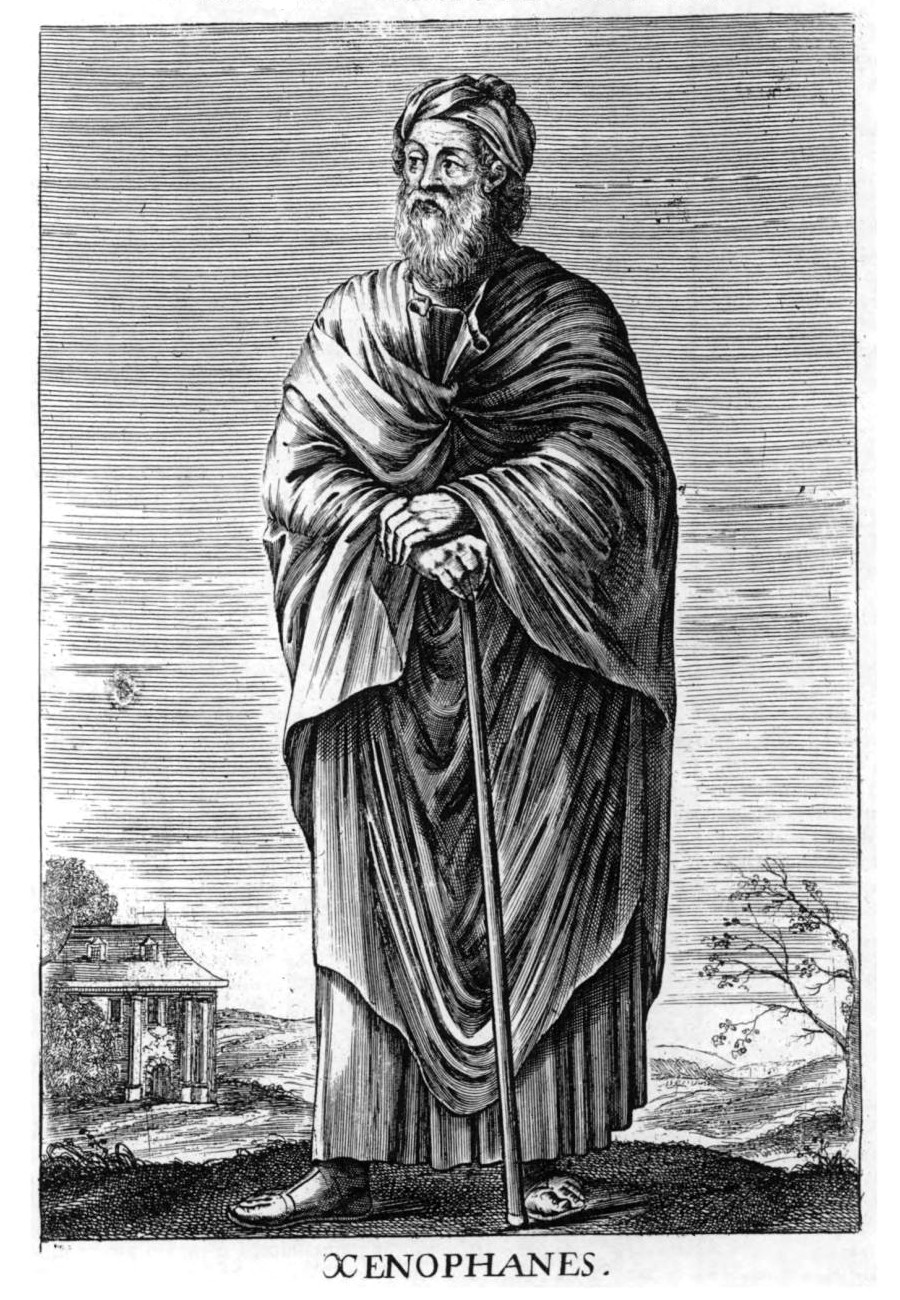
Xenophanes of Colophon was considered a pandeist by physicist and philosopher Max Bernhard Weinstein.

The earliest seeds of pandeism coincide with notions of monotheism, which generally can be traced back to the Atenism of Akhenaten, and the Babylonian-era Marduk. Weinstein thought the ancient Egyptian idea of primary matter derived from an original spirit was a form of pandeism. He also found varieties of pandeism in spiritual traditions from ancient China (especially with respect to Taoism as expressed by Lao-Tze), India (especially in the Hindu Bhagavad Gita), and among various Greek and Roman philosophers.

The 6th century BC Greek philosopher Xenophanes of Colophon has been described by some scholars as a pandeistic thinker. Weinstein wrote that Xenophanes spoke as a pandeist in stating that there was one god which "abideth ever in the selfsame place, moving not at all" and yet "sees all over, thinks all over, and hears all over". Weinstein also found elements of pandeism in the ideas of Heraclitus, the Stoics, and especially in the later students of the 'Platonic Pythagoreans' and the 'Pythagorean Platonists. He specifically identified 3rd century BC philosopher Chrysippus, who affirmed that "the universe itself is God and the universal outpouring of its soul", as a pandeist.

Religious studies professor, F. E. Peters found that "[w]hat appeared ... at the center of the Pythagorean tradition in philosophy, is another view of psyche that seems to owe little or nothing to the pan-vitalism or pan-deism that is the legacy of the Milesians". Historian of philosophy Andrew Gregory thought that, of the Milesians, "some construction using pan-, whether it be pantheism, pandeism or pankubernism, describes Anaximander reasonably well", although he questions whether Anaximander's view of the distinction between apeiron and cosmos makes these labels technically relevant at all. Gottfried Große in his 1787 interpretation of Pliny the Elder's Natural History, describes Pliny, a first-century figure, as "if not a Spinozist, then perhaps a Pandeist".

=== Middle Ages to Enlightenment ===
The philosophy of 9th century theologian Johannes Scotus Eriugena, who proposed that "God has created the world out of his own being", has been identified as a form of pandeism. Weinstein notes that Eriugena's vision of God was one which does not know what it is, and learns this through the process of existing as its creation. In his great work, De divisione naturae (also called Periphyseon, probably completed around 867 AD), Eriugena proposed that the nature of the universe is divisible into four distinct classes:

1 – that which creates and is not created;
2 – that which is created and creates;
3 – that which is created and does not create;
4 – that which neither is created nor creates.

The first stage is God as the ground or origin of all things; the second is the world of Platonic ideals or forms; the third is the wholly physical manifestation of our Universe, which "does not create"; the last is God as the final end or goal of all things, that into which the world of created things ultimately returns to completeness with the additional knowledge of having experienced this world. A contemporary statement of this idea is that: "Since God is not a being, he is therefore not intelligible... This means not only that we cannot understand him, but also that he cannot understand himself. Creation is a kind of divine effort by God to understand himself, to see himself in a mirror". French journalist Jean-Jacques Gabut agreed, writing that "a certain pantheism, or rather pandeism, emerges from his work where Neo-Platonic inspiration perfectly complements the strict Christian orthodoxy". Eriugena himself denied that he was a pantheist.

Weinstein thought that 13th-century Catholic thinker Bonaventure—who championed the Platonic doctrine that ideas do not exist in rerum natura, but as ideals exemplified by the Divine Being, according to which actual things were formed—showed strong pandeistic inclinations. Bonaventure was of the Franciscan school created by Alexander of Hales and in speaking of the possibility of creation from eternity, declared that reason can demonstrate that the world was not created ab aeterno. Of another Catholic, Nicholas of Cusa, who wrote of the enfolding of creation in God and the unfolding of the divine human mind in creation, Weinstein wrote that he was, to a certain extent, a pandeist. He held a similar view of Franciscus Mercurius van Helmont, who had written A Cabbalistical Dialogue (Latin version first, 1677, in English 1682) placing matter and spirit on a continuum, and describing matter as a "coalition" of monads.

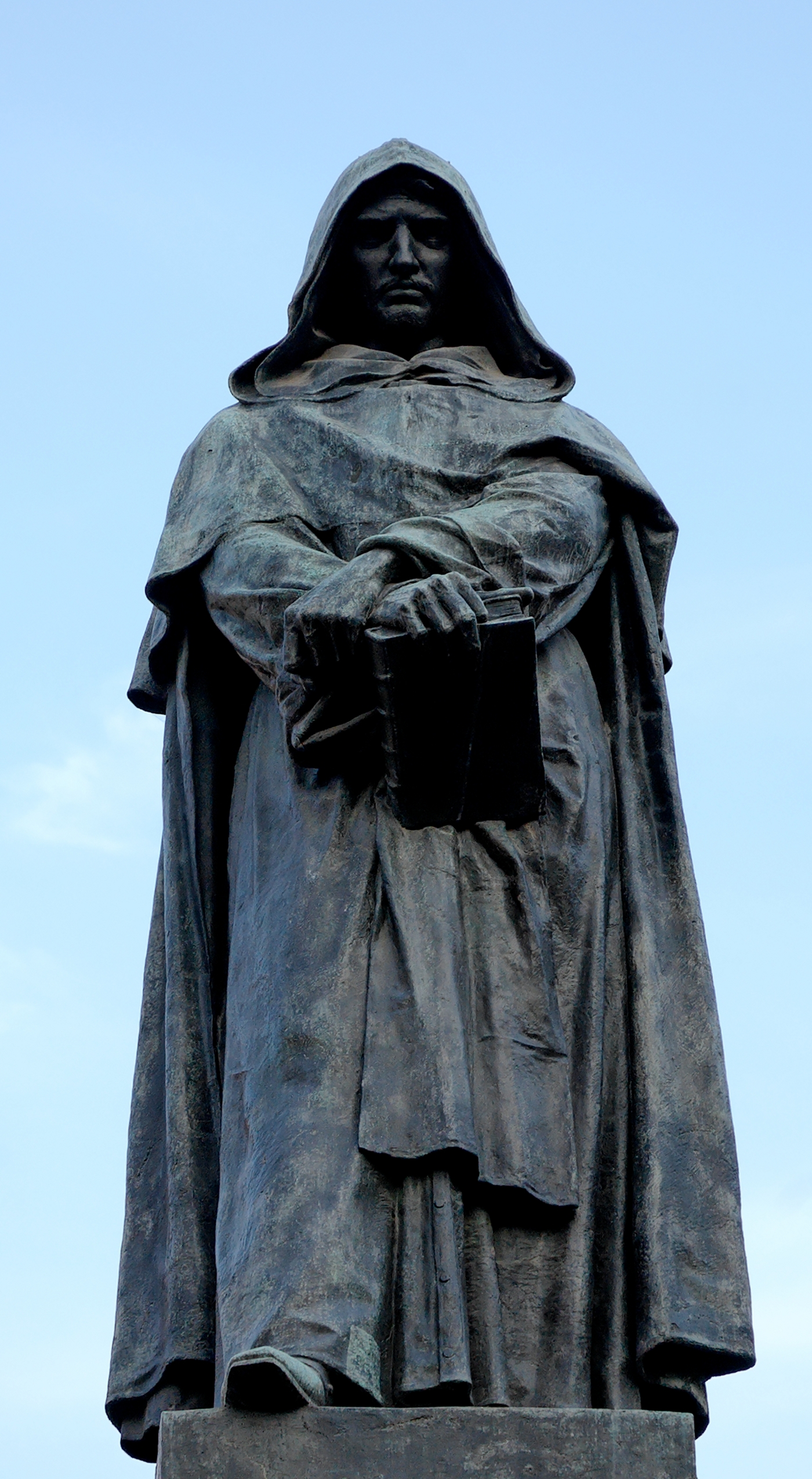
Giordano Bruno, identified by several sources as a pandeistic thinker

Several historians and theologians, including Weinstein, found that pandeism was strongly expressed in the teachings of Giordano Bruno, who envisioned a deity which had no particular relation to one part of the infinite universe more than any other, and was immanent, as present on Earth as in the Heavens, subsuming in itself the multiplicity of existence. This assessment of Bruno's theology was reiterated by others, including Discover editor Corey S. Powell, who wrote that Bruno's cosmology was "a tool for advancing an animist or Pandeist theology". The Cambridge Companion to Joseph Ratzinger notes that Joseph Ratzinger, who would later become Pope, was in particular "critical of ... [Bruno's] pandeism". Lutheran theologian Otto Kirn criticized as overbroad Weinstein's assertions that such historical philosophers as John Scotus Eriugena, Anselm of Canterbury, Nicholas of Cusa, Giordano Bruno, Moses Mendelssohn, and Gotthold Ephraim Lessing all were pandeists or leaned towards pandeism.

In Italy, Pandeism was among the beliefs condemned by Padre Filippo Nannetti di Bibulano (also known as il Filippo Nani, Padre da Lojano; 1759–1829) in volumes of his sermons published posthumously in the 1830s. Nannetti specifically criticized pandeism, declaring, "To you, fatal Pandeist! the laws that create nature are contingent and mutable, not another being in substance with forces driven by motions and developments". In 1838, an anonymous treatise, Il legato di un vecchio ai giovani della sua patria ("The Legacy of an Old Man to the Young People of his Country"), was published, in which the author, discussing the theory of religion presented by Giambattista Vico a century earlier, speculated that when man first saw meteor showers, "his robust imagination recognized the effects as a cause, then deifying natural phenomena, he became a Pandeist, an instructor of Mythology, a priest, an Augur". In the same year, phrenologist Luigi Ferrarese in Memorie Riguardanti la Dottrina Frenologica ("Thoughts Regarding the Doctrine of Phrenology") critically described Victor Cousin's philosophy as a doctrine which "locates reason outside the human person, declaring man a fragment of God, introducing a sort of spiritual pandeism, absurd for us, and injurious to the Supreme Being".

Literary critic Hayden Carruth said of 18th-century figure Alexander Pope that it was "Pope's rationalism and pandeism with which he wrote the greatest mock-epic in English literature" According to American Philosophy: An Encyclopedia, "later Unitarian Christians (such as William Ellery Channing), transcendentalists (such as Ralph Waldo Emerson and Henry David Thoreau), writers (such as Walt Whitman) and some pragmatists (such as William James) took a more pantheist or pandeist approach by rejecting views of God as separate from the world". Walt Whitman has elsewhere been deemed "a skeptic and a pandeist". Schick and Vaughn similarly associate the views of William James with pandeism. The Belgian poet Robert Vivier wrote of the pandeism to be found in the works of Nineteenth Century novelist and poet Victor Hugo. In the 19th century, poet Alfred Tennyson revealed that his "religious beliefs also defied convention, leaning towards agnosticism and pandeism". Literature professor Harold Bloom wrote of Tennyson, that towards the end of his life Tennyson "declared himself agnostic and pan-deist and at one with the great heretics Giordano Bruno and Baruch Spinoza". Charles Darwin has been described as having views that were "a good match for deism, or possibly for pandeism". Friedrich Engels has also been described by historian Tristram Hunt as having pandeistic views.

=== Post-Enlightenment philosophy ===
==== Eastern ====
Some authors have pointed to pandeism as having a presence in the cultures of Asia. In 1833, religionist Godfrey Higgins theorized in his Anacalypsis that "Pandeism was a doctrine, which had been received both by Buddhists and Brahmins". In 1896, historian Gustavo Uzielli described the world's population as influenced "by a superhuman idealism in Christianity, by an anti-human nihilism in Buddhism, and by an incipient but growing pandeism in Indian Brahmanism". The following year, the Reverend Henry Grattan Guinness wrote critically that in India, "God is everything, and everything is God, and, therefore, everything may be adored. ... Her pan-deism is a pandemonium". Twenty years earlier, the Peruvian scholar and historian Carlos Wiesse Portocarrero had written in an essay titled Philosophical Systems of India that in that country, "Metaphysics is pandeistic and degenerates into idealism". In 2019, Swiss thinker James B. Glattfelder has described the Hindu concept of lila as "akin to the concept of pandeism". German political philosopher Jürgen Hartmann argued that Hindu pandeism has contributed to friction with monotheistic Islam.

Pandeism (in Chinese, 泛自然神论) was described by Wen Chi, in a Peking University lecture, as embodying "a major feature of Chinese philosophical thought", in that "there is a harmony between man and the divine, and they are equal". Zhang Dao Kui (张道葵) of the China Three Gorges University proposed that the art of China's Three Gorges area is influenced by "a representation of the romantic essence that is created when integrating rugged simplicity with the natural beauty spoken about by pandeism". Literary critic Wang Junkang (王俊康) has written that, in Chinese folk religion as conveyed in the early novels of noted folk writer Ye Mei (叶梅), "the romantic spirit of Pandeism can be seen everywhere". Wang Junkang additionally writes of Ye Mei's descriptions of "the worship of reproduction under Pandeism, as demonstrated in romantic songs sung by village people to show the strong impulse of vitality and humanity and the beauty of wildness". It has been noted that author Shen Congwen has attributed a kind of hysteria that "afflicts those young girls who commit suicide by jumping into caves-"luodong" 落洞" to "the repressive local military culture that imposes strict sexual codes on women and to the influence of pan-deism among Miao people", since "for a nymphomaniac, jumping into a cave leads to the ultimate union with the god of the cave". Weinstein similarly found the views of 17th century Japanese Neo-Confucian philosopher Yamazaki Ansai, who espoused a cosmology of universal mutual interconnectedness, to be especially consonant with pandeism.

==== Western ====
In The Pilgrimage from Deism to Agnosticism, Moncure Daniel Conway stated that the term, "Pandeism" is "an unscholarly combination". A critique of Pandeism similar to Conway's, as an 'unsightly' combination of Greek and Latin, was made in a review of Weinstein's discussion of Pandeism. In 1905, a few years before Weinstein's extensive review was published, Ottmar Hegemann described the "New Catholicism" of Franz Mach as a form of pandeism. A 1906 editorial by a Unitarian minister in the Chattanooga Daily Times stated that Jesus, "who in exultant faith said 'I and the Father are one', was a Pandeist, a believer in the identification of the universe and all things contained therein with Deity". Towards the beginning of World War I, an article in the Yale Sheffield Monthly published by the Yale University Sheffield Scientific School commented on speculation that the war "means the death of Christianity and an era of Pandeism or perhaps even the destruction of all which we call modern civilization and culture". The following year, early 19th-century German philosopher Paul Friedrich Köhler wrote that Pantheism, Pandeism, Monism and Dualism all refer to the same God illuminated in different ways, and that whatever the label, the human soul emanates from this God.

According to literary critic Martin Lüdke, early Twentieth-Century Portuguese poet Fernando Pessoa expressed a pandeistic philosophy, especially in the writings made under the pseudonym of Alberto Caeiro. Brazilian journalist and writer Otávio de Faria, and British scholar and translator of Portuguese fiction Giovanni Pontiero, among others, identified pandeism as an influence on the writings of mid-Twentieth-Century Brazilian poet Carlos Nejar.

Pandeism was examined by theologian Charles Hartshorne, one of the chief disciples of process philosopher Alfred North Whitehead. In his process theology, an extension of Whitehead's work, Hartshorne preferred pandeism to pantheism, explaining that "it is not really the theos that is described". However, he specifically rejected pandeism early on, finding that a God who had "absolute perfection in some respects, relative perfection in all others" was "able consistently to embrace all that is positive in either deism or pandeism". Hartshorne accepted the label of panentheism for his beliefs, declaring that "panentheistic doctrine contains all of deism and pandeism except their arbitrary negations".

Calvinist scholar Rousas John Rushdoony sharply criticized the Catholic Church in his 1971 The One and the Many: Studies in the Philosophy of Order and Ultimacy, writing, "The position of Pope Paul came close to being a pan-Deism, and pan-Deism is the logical development of the virus of Hellenic thought", and further that "a sincere idealist, implicitly pan-Deist in faith, deeply concerned with the problems of the world and of time, can be a Ghibelline pope, and Dante's Ghibellines have at last triumphed". Adventist Theologian Bert B. Beach wrote in 1974 that "during the Vatican Council there was criticism from WCC Circles" to the effect that "ecumenism was being contaminated by 'pan-Deist' and syncretistic tendencies".

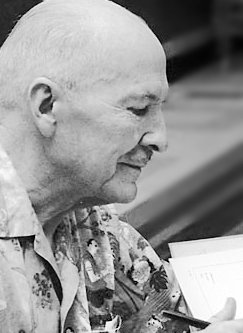
Science fiction writer Robert A. Heinlein was noted as having experimented with themes of pandeism in various of this works.

Science-fiction writer Robert A. Heinlein raised the idea of pandeism in several of his works. Literary critic Dan Schneider wrote of Heinlein's Stranger In A Strange Land that Jubal Harshaw's belief in his own free will, was one "which Mike, Jill, and the Fosterites misinterpret as a pandeistic urge, 'Thou art God!'" Heinlein himself, in the "Aphorisms of Lazarus Long" from Time Enough for Love, wrote: "God split himself into a myriad parts that he might have friends. This may not be true, but it sounds good—and is no sillier than any other theology".

In a 1990 interview with the Chicago Tribune, Los Angeles Lakers coach and sometime-spiritual author Phil Jackson, describing his religious views, said "I've always liked the concept of God being beyond anything that the human mind can conceive. I think there is a pantheistic-deistic-American Indian combination religion out there for Americans. That rings true to me". Jim Garvin, a Vietnam veteran who became a Trappist monk in the Holy Cross Abbey of Berryville, Virginia, described his spiritual position as "'pandeism' or 'pan-en-deism', something very close to the Native American concept of the all- pervading Great Spirit".

Pastor Bob Burridge of the Geneven Institute for Reformed Studies wrote that: "If God was the proximate cause of every act it would make all events to be 'God in motion'. That is nothing less than pantheism, or more exactly, pandeism". Burridge rejects this model, observing that in Christianity, "The Creator is distinct from his creation. The reality of secondary causes is what separates Christian theism from pandeism". Burridge argued that "calling God the author of sin demand[s] a pandeistic understanding of the universe effectively removing the reality of sin and moral law".

=== 21st-century developments ===
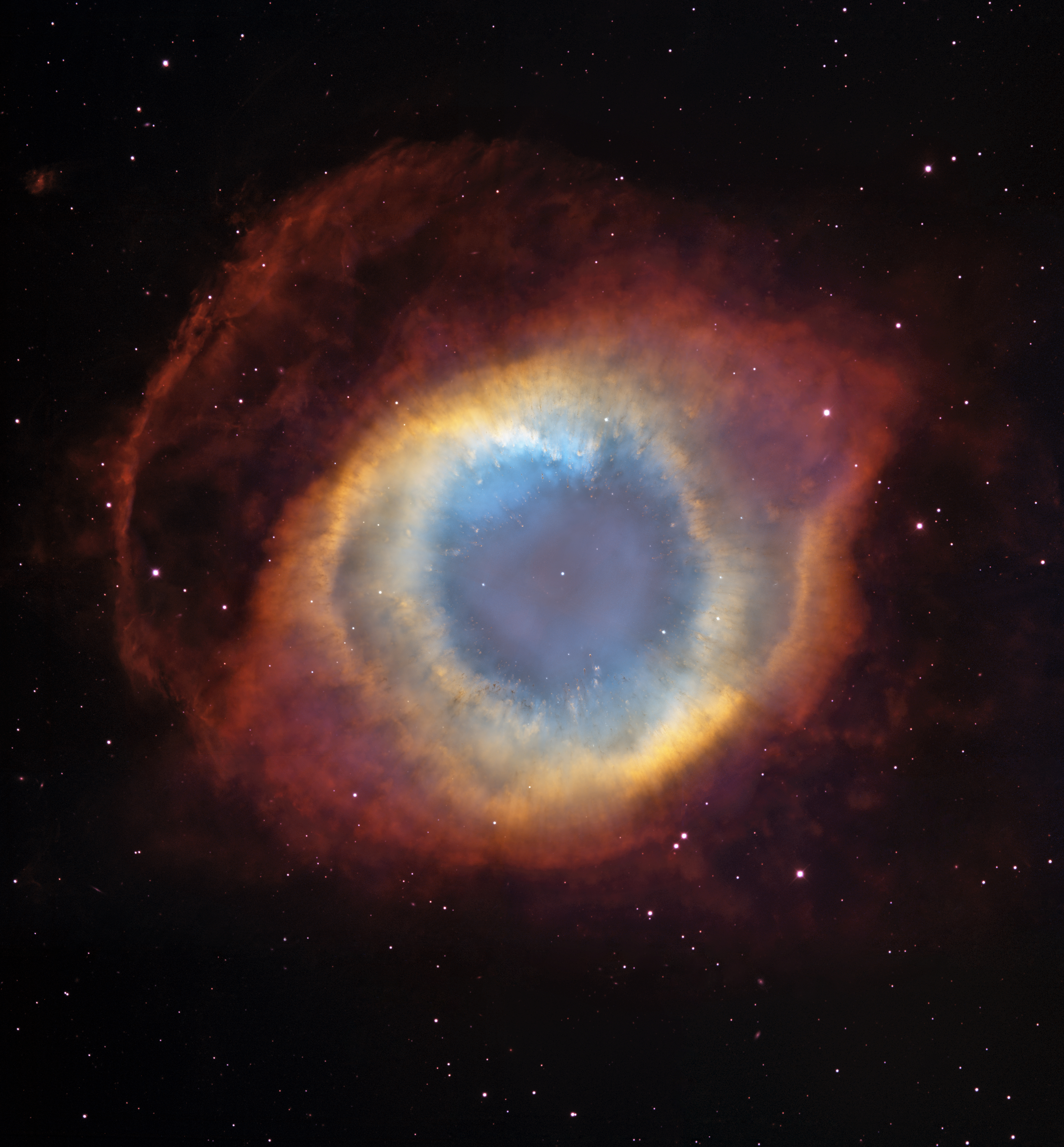
The Helix Nebula, commonly named the "Eye of God"

Author William C. Lane contends that pandeism is a logical derivation of German philosopher Gottfried Wilhelm Leibniz's proposition that ours is the best of all possible worlds. In 2010, Lane wrote:

If divine becoming were complete, God's kenosis—God's self-emptying for the sake of love—would be total. In this pandeistic view, nothing of God would remain separate and apart from what God would become. Any separate divine existence would be inconsistent with God's unreserved participation in the lives and fortunes of the actualized phenomena.

Acknowledging that American philosopher William Rowe has raised "a powerful, evidential argument against ethical theism", Lane further contended that pandeism offers an escape from the evidential argument from evil (a.k.a. the "problem of evil"):

However, it does not count against pandeism. In pandeism, God is no superintending, heavenly power, capable of hourly intervention into earthly affairs. No longer existing "above", God cannot intervene from above and cannot be blamed for failing to do so. Instead God bears all suffering, whether the fawn's or anyone else's. Even so, a skeptic might ask, "Why must there be so much suffering,? Why could not the world's design omit or modify the events that cause it?" In pandeism, the reason is clear: to remain unified, a world must convey information through transactions. Reliable conveyance requires relatively simple, uniform laws. Laws designed to skip around suffering-causing events or to alter their natural consequences (i.e., their consequences under simple laws) would need to be vastly complicated or (equivalently) to contain numerous exceptions.

Social scientist Sal Restivo similarly deems pandeism to be a means to evade the problem of evil.

Cartoonist and pundit Scott Adams has written two books on religion, God's Debris (2001), and The Religion War (2004), of which God's Debris lays out a theory of pandeism, in which God blows itself up to see what will happen, which becomes the cause of our universe. In God's Debris, Adams suggests that followers of theistic religions such as Christianity and Islam are inherently subconsciously aware that their religions are false, and that this awareness is reflected in their consistently acting like these religions, and their threats of damnation for sinners, are false. In a 2017 interview, Adams said these books would be "his ultimate legacy". In 2023, Adams announced in a pinned tweet that he had re-published the book for free for his subscribers, and would shortly publish an AI-voiced audiobook version.

In 2010 German astrophysicist and popular scientist Harald Lesch observed in a debate on the role of faith in science:

Suppose we would find the all-encompassing law of nature, we are looking for so that finally we could assure proudly, the world is built up this way and no differently—immediately it would create a new question: What is behind this law, why is the world set up just so? This leads us beyond the limits of science in the field of religion. As an expert, a physicist should respond: We do not know, we'll never know. Others would say that God authored this law, that created the universe. A Pandeist might say that the all-encompassing law is God.

Alan Dawe's 2011 book The God Franchise, though mentioning pandeism in passing as one of numerous extant theological theories, declines to adopt any "-ism" as encompassing his view, though Dawe's theory includes the human experience as being a temporarily segregated sliver of the experience of God. This aspect of the theology of pandeism (along with pantheism and panentheism) has been compared to the Biblical exhortation in Acts 17:28 that "In him we live and move and have our being", while the Wycliffe Bible Encyclopedia had in 1975 described the religion of Babylon as "clearly a type of pan-deism formed from a synthesis of Christianity and paganism". Another Christian theologian, Graham Ward, insists that "Attention to Christ and the Spirit delivers us from pantheism, pandeism, and process theology", and Catholic author Al Kresta observes:

"New Age" cosmologies reject materialism, naturalism and physicalism. They are commonly pantheistic or pandeistic. They frequently try to commandeer quantum physics and consciousness studies to illustrate their conception of the cosmos.

Also in 2011, in a study of Germany's Hesse region, German sociologist of religion and theologian Michael N. Ebertz and German television presenter and author Meinhard Schmidt-Degenhard concluded that "Six religious orientation types can be distinguished: 'Christians'—'non-Christian theists'—'Cosmotheists'—'Deists, Pandeists and Polytheists'—'Atheists'—'Others'“. Pandeism has also been described as one of the "older spiritual and religious traditions" whose elements are incorporated into the New Age movement, but also as among the handful of spiritual beliefs which are compatible with modern science. Neurologist Michael P. Remler associated pandeism with panpsychism, describing as radical the "pan-deist position that some "Consciousness" interacts with all matter". Resurgence of interest in pandeism was such that by 2022, Gorazd Andrejč and Victoria Dos Santos, in their introduction to the MDPI Religions special issue, "Religion, Science and Technology in Pantheism, Animism and Paganism", wrote: "While pantheism and its 'cousins' (panentheism, pandeism) have experienced some vibrant development in this field in recent years, modern animist and pagan perspectives have had less critical attention in the same".

In the 2020s, pandeism has been described as one of the better possible theological models to encompass humankind's relationship with a future artificial intelligence.

== Notable thinkers ==
- Bruce Parry
- Alfred, Lord Tennyson
- Max Bernhard Weinstein
- Walt Whitman
- Paul Zarzyski

== See also ==
- Advaita Vedanta
- Christianity and pandeism
- Creative Evolution, by Henri Bergson, Chapter IV
- Criticism of pandeism
- Deus otiosus
- God becomes the Universe
- God's Debris, by Scott Adams
- Ietsism
- Lila (Hinduism)
- Omnism
- Panentheism
- Panpsychism
- Tat Tvam Asi
