= Otto Kirn =

German Lutheran theologian (1857–1911)

- Born: January 23, 1857; Heslach, Stuttgart
- Died: August 18, 1911 (aged 54); Leipzig
- Education: Evangelical Seminaries of Maulbronn and Blaubeuren; University of Tübingen
- Occupation: Lutheran theologian

Otto Kirn (January 23, 1857 – August 18, 1911) was a German Lutheran theologian and university professor.

== Life ==
Kirn went through the Evangelical Seminaries of Maulbronn and Blaubeuren, where he was trained, among others, by the philosopher Karl Christian Planck. From 1875 to 1880 he studied philosophy and theology at the University of Tübingen and was then a lecturer at the Tübinger Stift from 1881 to 1884. In 1886 he earned the degree of Lic. Theol. with the work Die christliche Vollkommenheit (The Christian Perfection) and in 1889 he was finally promoted to Doctor of Philosophy and graduated with the dissertation Kants transcendentale Dialektik in ihrer Bedeutung für die Religionsphilosophie (Kant's Transcendental Dialectic in its Importance for the Philosophy of Religion). During his time as a doctoral student he worked from 1885 to 1889 in Besigheim as a Deacon.

After his doctorate Kirn turned to Basel. There he began in 1889 as a Privatdozent for New Testament and systematic theology, in 1890 extraordinary and finally in 1894 full Professor of the University of Basel in this field. Just one year later he moved to the Faculty of Theology of the University of Leipzig as a Full Professor of Systematic Theology. He was dean at the faculty in 1900/1901 and 1906/1907. He died in office.

In 1896, the University of Tübingen awarded him the honorary doctorate in theology.

== Publications (selection) ==
- Goethes Lebensweisheit in ihrem Verhältniss zum Christentum (Goethe's wisdom of life in its relation to Christianity), Leipzig 1900.
- Grundriß der evangelischen Dogmatik (Floor plan of the Protestant Dogmatics), Leipzig 1905.
- Grundriss der theologischen Ethik (Floor plan of the theological ethics), Leipzig 1906.
- Die Leipziger Theologische Fakultät in fünf Jahrhunderten (The Leipzig Theological Faculty in five centuries), Berlin 1910.
- Die sittlichen Forderungen Jesu, (The Moral Claims of Jesus), Berlin 1910.
- Review of Alfred Bertholet's Aesthetische und christliche Lebesauffassung (Aesthetic and Christian living) in Theologische Literaturzeitung, vol.35, no. 18, September 1910, p. 569.
- Weinstein, Prof. Dr. Max B., Welt- und Lebensanschauungen, Hervorgegangen aus Religion, Philosophie und Naturerkenntnis (review of Prof. Dr. Max Bernhard Weinstein's World and Life Views, Emerging From Religion, Philosophy and Nature) in Theologische Literaturzeitung (Theological Literature Journal), Volume 35, 1910.

In the latter work, Kirn criticized as overbroad Max Bernhard Weinstein's assertions that such historical philosophers as John Scotus Eriugena, Anselm of Canterbury, Nicholas of Cusa, Giordano Bruno, Moses Mendelssohn, and Gotthold Ephraim Lessing were pandeists or leaned towards pandeism.

== Literature ==
- Helmar Junghans: Kirn, Otto. In: Neue Deutsche Biographie (NDB). Volume 11, Duncker & Humblot, Berlin 1977, ISBN 3-428-00192-3 , p. 669 f. (Digitized).
