= Maddalena lunatic asylum =

Maddalena Lunatic Asylum
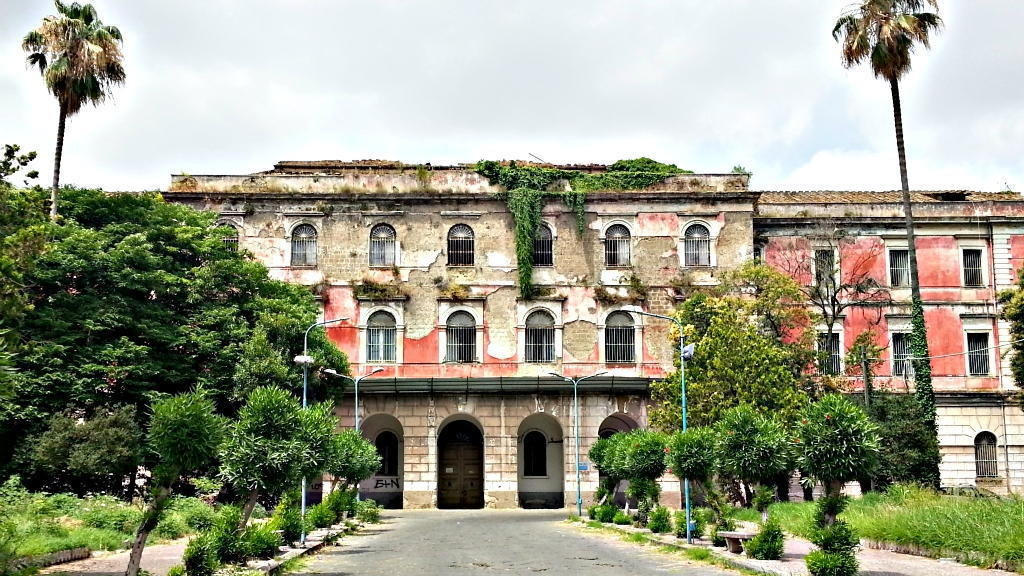
- Maddalena Aversa

Geography
- Location: Aversa, Province of Caserta, Italy
- Coordinates: 40.9735°N 14.1964°E

Organisation
- Type: Specialist

Services
- Speciality: Psychiatric hospital

History
- Opened: 1813

Links
- Lists: Hospitals in Italy

The Maddalena lunatic asylum was a famous insane asylum, established in 1813 in Aversa, near Naples, Italy. It was founded by Joachim Murat, and for a time led by the phrenologist Luigi Ferrarese. It was "a celebrated lunatic asylum," both for its size and grandeur and for being "one of the earliest to discard the old system of harsh restraint."

Between Capua and Naples, in the town of Aversa, there is an excellent lunatic asylum, called the Maddalena. This edifice, which is spacious and elegantly clean, has belonging to it a large garden and a handsome church; and that persons who are sent to this asylum may be pleased with its outward appearance, the grates of every window are shaped and painted to represent flowerpots filled with flowers. The attendance here is particularly good, and the utmost gentleness and indulgence are practiced toward the patients, each of whom pays fifteen ducats per month; for which sum they live comfortably. The Maddalena accommodates five hundred patients.

The physical facilities of the asylum were described as follows: It was divided into three distinct parts. The first was a converted former Franciscan convent, and was used to house male patients who were "affected with the different forms of lunacy, uncomplicated, however, with other nervous complaints." A second facility housed patients who, "in addition to mental derangement, were affected with epilepsy," and a third house was for female patients of all manner of diagnosis. Lady Blessington's early nineteenth-century praise for this institution in her "Idler in Italy" has been cited as contradicting Michel Foucault's thesis in Histoire de la Folie.
