= Scott Adams =

American cartoonist and author (1957–2026)

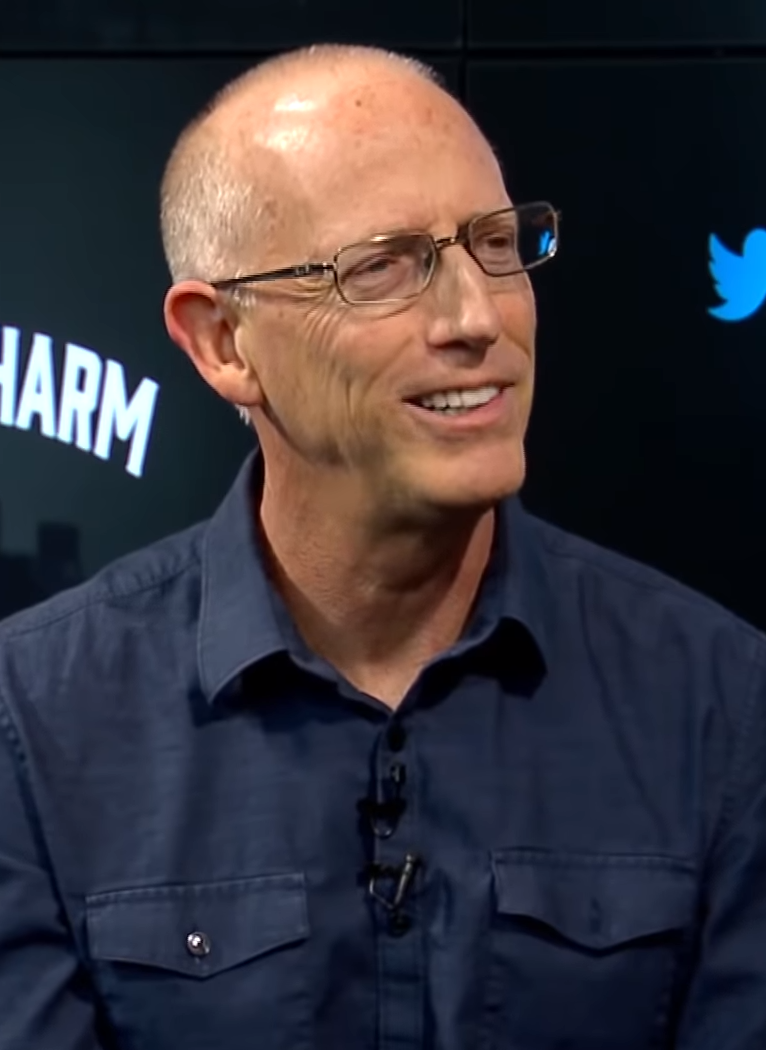
- Adams in 2017
- Born: Scott Raymond Adams; June 8, 1957; Windham, New York, U.S.
- Died: January 13, 2026 (aged 68); Pleasanton, California, U.S.
- Education: Hartwick College (BA); University of California, Berkeley (MBA)
- Occupations: Cartoonist; writer; political commentator
- Years active: 1989–2026
- Spouses: Shelly Miles (m. 2006; div. 2014); Kristina Basham (m. 2020; div. 2022)

YouTube information
- Channel: Real Coffee with Scott Adams
- Years active: 2018–2026
- Subscribers: 209,000
- Views: 78.1 million
- Last updated: January 15, 2026
- Website: scottadams.locals.com

Scott Raymond Adams (June 8, 1957 – January 13, 2026) was an American cartoonist, author, and commentator. He was famous as the creator of the Dilbert comic strip and nonfiction works of business, self-improvement, commentary, and satire.

Adams created Dilbert in 1989 and worked in corporate roles before becoming a full-time cartoonist in 1995. By the mid-1990s, Dilbert had gained national prominence in the United States and began to reach a worldwide audience, remaining popular throughout the following decades and spawning several books written by Adams. In the mid-2010s, Adams emerged as an independent commentator on events and politics.

He wrote satire about the social and psychological landscape of white-collar workers in corporations. In addition, Adams wrote books in other areas, including the pandeistic spiritual novella God's Debris (2001) and books on political and management topics, including Loserthink (2019).

In February 2023, Dilbert was dropped by numerous newspapers and its distributor, Andrews McMeel Syndication, after Adams made racist comments on his Real Coffee YouTube channel, which he defended as hyperbole. He relaunched Dilbert as a webcomic on his Locals website one month later and continued to be active on social media. Adams announced he was diagnosed with prostate cancer in May 2025 and retired from drawing that year, but stated he would continue writing Dilbert as long as he was able. He died on January 13, 2026, at the age of 68.

== Early life and education ==
Scott Raymond Adams was born on June 8, 1957, in Windham, New York, to Paul and Virginia (née Vining) Adams. He said that he was "about half German" and had English, Irish, Welsh, Scottish, and Dutch ancestry. In 2016, he said he had a small amount of Native American ancestry, but later discovered via 23andMe genetic testing that he has no detectable Native American genetic markers. He was a fan of Peanuts comics while growing up and began drawing comics at age 6. He won a drawing competition at 11.

Adams graduated from Windham-Ashland-Jewett Central School in Windham in 1975 and was the valedictorian of his class of 39 students. He earned a Bachelor of Arts in economics from Hartwick College in Oneonta, New York, in 1979. He then moved to California and worked there. In 1986, he earned a Master of Business Administration from the University of California, Berkeley. Adams took Dale Carnegie Training courses and called them "life changing".

== Career ==
=== Office worker ===
Adams worked closely with telecommunications engineers at Crocker National Bank in San Francisco between 1979 and 1986. Upon joining the organization, he first worked as a teller. After four months in which he was twice held up at gunpoint, he entered a management training program. His positions included management trainee, computer programmer, budget analyst, commercial lender, product manager, and supervisor.

He later shifted to work at Pacific Bell. Devoting time to building a new career, he woke up every day at 4 a.m. and spent time on various endeavors; cartooning proved to be the most successful of them. Adams created Dilbert during this period of personal exploration. The Dilbert name was suggested by his former boss, Mike Goodwin. Dogbert, originally named Dildog, was loosely based on his family's deceased pet beagle Lucy. His submissions of Dilbert and other comic panels to various publications, including The New Yorker and Playboy, were not published, but an inspirational letter from a fan persuaded Adams to keep trying. He worked at Pacific Bell between 1986 and June 30, 1995, and the personalities he encountered there inspired many of his Dilbert characters. In 1989, while still employed at Pacific Bell, Adams launched Dilbert with United Media. To maintain his income, he continued to draw his cartoons during the early morning hours. His first payment for Dilbert was a monthly royalty check of $368.62. Dilbert gradually became more popular. It was syndicated in 100 newspapers in 1991 and 400 by 1994. Adams attributed his success to his idea of including his email address in the panels, which resulted in feedback and suggestions from readers.

=== Full-time cartoonist and author ===
Adams's success grew, and he became a full-time cartoonist as Dilbert reached 800 newspapers. In 1996, his first business book, The Dilbert Principle, was released. It expounded on his concept of the Dilbert principle. In 1997, Adams won the National Cartoonists Society's Reuben Award for Outstanding Cartoonist and Best Newspaper Comic Strip. Logitech CEO Pierluigi Zappacosta invited Adams to impersonate a management consultant, which he did wearing a wig and false mustache. He tricked Logitech managers into adopting a mission statement that Adams described as "so impossibly complicated that it has no real content whatsoever". His writing in San Jose Mercury News West Magazine regarding the incident earned him an Orwell Award. By 2000, the comic was in 2,000 newspapers in 57 countries and 19 languages.

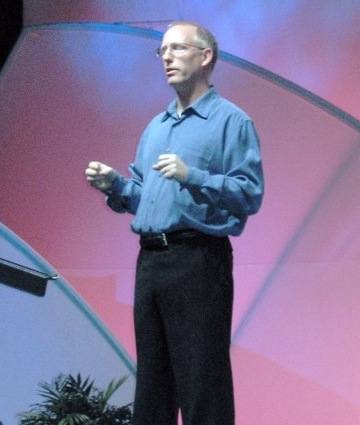
Adams in 2007

His comic strips were adapted as an animated television series, which premiered in January 1999 and ran for two seasons on UPN. Adams served as executive producer and showrunner, along with Seinfeld writer Larry Charles. The show earned a Primetime Emmy Award in 1999. Adams later said that the show had been canceled because he was white and UPN had decided to shift toward African-American viewers.

In addition to his cartoon work, Adams wrote books in various other areas, including self-improvement and religion. His book God's Debris (2001) lays out a theory of pandeism, in which God blows itself up to see what will happen, which becomes the cause of our universe. In The Religion War (2004), Adams suggests that followers of theistic religions such as Christianity and Islam are subconsciously aware that their beliefs are false, and that this awareness is reflected in their consistently acting as if these religions, and their threats of damnation for sinners, are untrue. In a 2017 interview, Adams said that his books on religion, not Dilbert, would be his ultimate legacy.

On a February 22, 2023, livestream of his Real Coffee with Scott Adams program, Adams, then 65, reacted to a poll that asked if respondents agreed that "it's okay to be white", a phrase described by the Anti-Defamation League as associated with the white supremacist movement. The poll showed 26% of black respondents disagreed with the statement and 21% were not sure. Adams, upset that nearly half did not agree, described black people as a "hate group" and said "the best advice I would give to white people is to get the hell away from black people; just get the fuck away". In response to those and other related comments, Dilbert was dropped by numerous newspapers across the country, including The New York Times (in its international print edition), Los Angeles Times, The Washington Post, and USA Today-affiliated newspapers. Andrews McMeel Syndication, the distributor of Dilbert, announced on February 27, 2023, that it was severing all ties with Adams for his racist remarks. Portfolio, his book publisher, announced it was dropping his non-Dilbert book that was scheduled for release that September. Adams defended his remarks as hyperbole and as taken out of context in reportage; he disavowed racism and asserted that nobody would disagree with what he said were his main points: do not discriminate and avoid things that look like they will put one at risk. On March 13, Adams relaunched Dilbert as Dilbert Reborn on the subscription website Locals, minus the earlier Dilbert comics.

On November 15, 2025, he announced he would no longer draw Dilbert because his right hand had focal dystonia and his left hand was semi-paralyzed, but would continue writing the strip as long as he was able to. His art director took over as the artist.

=== Real Coffee with Scott Adams ===
In 2015, Adams wrote blog posts predicting that Donald Trump had a 98 percent chance of winning the presidency based on his persuasion skills, and he started writing about Trump's persuasion techniques. His pieces on this topic grew popular, so he started writing about it regularly. Adams soon developed this as a daily video presentation called Real Coffee with Scott Adams, distributed to Periscope, YouTube, and ScottAdamsSays.com.

Real Coffee with Scott Adams featured guests such as Naval Ravikant, Ed Latimore, Dave Rubin, Erik Finman, Greg Gutfeld, Matt Gaetz, Ben Askren, Carpe Donktum, Steve Hsu, Michael Shellenberger, Carson Griffith, Shiva Ayyadurai, James Nortey, Clint Morgan, and Bjørn Lomborg. In 2018, Kanye West shared several clips on Twitter from the Coffee episode "Scott Adams tells you how Kanye showed the way to The Golden Age. With Coffee." In 2020, President Trump retweeted an episode where Adams mocked Joe Biden. Adams offered paid subscriptions for exclusive content on Locals. In 2020, Adams said: "For context, I expect my Dilbert income to largely disappear in the next year as newspapers close up forever. The coronavirus sped up that inevitable trend. Like many of you, I'm reinventing my life for a post-coronavirus world. The Locals platform is a big part of that."

=== Other ===
An advertisement for the Spicy Indian Dilberito

Adams started Scott Adams Foods, Inc. in 1999, which made the Dilberito and Protein Chef. First announced in The Dilbert Future and introduced in 1999, the Dilberito was a vegetarian microwave burrito that came in flavors of Mexican, Indian, Barbecue, and Garlic & Herb. It was sold through some health food stores. Adams's inspiration for the product was that "diet is the number one cause of health-related problems in the world. I figured I could put a dent in that problem and make some money at the same time." He aimed to create a healthy food product that also had mass appeal, a concept he called "the blue jeans of food".

A Flash game titled Dilberito was developed and published by Blam! Video Game Development in 2000 for Scott Adams Foods. The product failed to catch on in the market, leading Adams "several years and several million dollars later" to sell off his intellectual property and exit the business. Adams himself said, "[t]he mineral fortification was hard to disguise, and because of the veggie and legume content, three bites of the Dilberito made you fart so hard your intestines formed a tail." The New York Times said the burrito "could have been designed only by a food technologist or by someone who eats lunch without much thought to taste". Adams sold off his intellectual property in Scott Adams Foods when the Dilberito failed in the marketplace in 2003.

Adams was a restaurateur starting in 1997, but exited that business before 2017. Adams co-founded the service WhenHub, which has been described by Gizmodo as "similar to Cameo ... except instead of pre-recorded messages from movie stars and rappers, it offers live chats with a range of subject-matter experts". In 2019, Adams briefly received negative media attention when during the Gilroy Garlic Festival shooting on July 28, the 62-year-old cartoonist posted a tweet suggesting that witnesses download the WhenHub app and "set your price to take calls". He later apologized, saying the message was "poorly worded". As of 2024, the WhenHub website is inactive.

Adams had a cameo in "Review", a third-season episode of the TV series NewsRadio, in which Matthew Brock (played by Andy Dick) becomes an obsessed Dilbert fan. Adams is credited as "Guy in line behind Dave and Joe in first scene". Adams was a guest on podcasts including Making Sense with Sam Harris, The Tim Ferriss Show, The James Altucher Show, The Ben Shapiro Show, The Rubin Report, Real Talk with Zuby and The David Pakman Show. He appeared on Real Time with Bill Maher, Commonwealth Club of California, Fox News and Berkeley Haas. Adams was interviewed for Mike Cernovich's documentaries Silenced (2016) and Hoaxed (2019).

== Political views ==
Adams often commented on political and social matters, although he said in 2016, "I don't vote and I am not a member of a political party." As of 2008, Adams identified his views on social issues as "[leaning] libertarian, minus the crazy stuff". After endorsing Mitt Romney for the 2012 presidential election, Adams endorsed Donald Trump in the 2016 presidential election. During that election, he wrote extensively on Trump, praising his persuasion skills, and later described his support for Trump as a factor in ending his public speaking career, as well as negatively affecting his income and friendships. He also spoke against Trump's opponent Hillary Clinton, expressing concerns that Clinton's candidacy would lower the status of men in America. In 2017, Adams described his views as supporting left-wing policies he perceived as realistic.

Adams made various predictions about politics. Early in the 2016 election, Adams predicted Trump would win based on his analysis of how persuasive the candidates were. As Trump gained momentum, Adams's election analysis gained media and popular attention. Later, these predictions repeatedly featured in Politico magazine's annual list of "Worst Predictions", including that either one of Trump, Bernie Sanders, or Joe Biden would die from COVID-19 by the end of 2020, that "Republicans will be hunted" if Biden won the 2020 presidential election, and that the 2024 presidential election would be ultimately overturned in Trump's favor by the U.S. Supreme Court regardless of outcome.

After the 2022 Highland Park parade shooting, Adams, then 65, opined that society leaves parents of troubled teenage boys with only two options: to either watch people die or murder their own son. He said his comments were inspired by his own stepson, who became addicted to drugs at age 14 and later died of a fentanyl overdose. Adams was anti-masking and believed that people unvaccinated against COVID-19 "came out the best" compared to vaccinated people, which PolitiFact determined to be incorrect.

In a 2006 blog post, Adams asked if official figures of the number of deaths in the Holocaust were based on methodologically sound research. In 2023, Adams suggested the 2017 Unite the Right rally was "an American intel op against Trump". In 2020, Adams said that the Dilbert TV show was canceled because he was white and UPN had decided to focus on an African-American audience, and that he had been discriminated against. In a series of comic strips in September 2022, Dilbert parodied environmental, social, and corporate governance (ESG) strategies. Part of the plotline involved a black character who "identif[ied] as white" and the company management asking him if he could also identify as gay.

== Personal life ==
Adams married Shelly Miles aboard a yacht, the Galaxy Commodore, on July 22, 2006, when he was 49, in San Francisco Bay, in a ceremony conducted by the ship's captain. The two had met at a gym in Pleasanton, California, where Shelly was an employee and Adams was a customer. Adams was a stepfather to Shelly's two children, Savannah and Justin, the latter of whom died of a fentanyl overdose in 2018 at age 18. Adams and Shelly divorced in 2014, and Adams said the two remained friends, with Shelly moving a block away after their separation.

On Christmas Day in 2019, Adams announced on his podcast that he was engaged to Kristina Basham, and later said that they married on July 11, 2020, a month and three days after his 63rd birthday. Basham, a model and baker, had two daughters and served as a vice-president at WhenHub. On March 10, 2022, Adams, then 64, announced on his YouTube podcast that he and Basham were getting divorced.

Adams said he was trained as a hypnotist. He credited affirmations for many of his achievements, including scoring in the ninety-fourth percentile on a difficult qualification exam for business school and creating Dilbert's success. He said that the affirmations gave him focus. He described a method he used that he said gave him success: he pictured in his mind what he wanted and wrote it down 15 times a day on a piece of paper. The technique is used by Dogbert in a 1989 Dilbert strip.

Adams lived in Pleasanton, California, and traveled in the San Francisco Bay Area. He had no biological children. Shortly before his death, Adams announced his intention to convert to Christianity, despite continuing to identify as a nonbeliever. He viewed the decision in pragmatic, cost-to-benefit terms, concluding the potential benefit of eternal salvation to outweigh any downside if the belief proved to be false.

== Health and death ==
In the early 1990s, the pinky finger of Adams's right hand would spasm when he tried to draw, and he was diagnosed with focal dystonia. He said he cured himself by doing a conditioning exercise. In late 2004, when he was 47, his focal dystonia returned, which affected his ability to draw for lengthy periods. Beginning in 2014, he drew on a graphics tablet, and had subsequently switched from using his right hand to his left. He also had spasmodic dysphonia, a condition that causes the vocal cords to behave abnormally. In July 2008, aged 51, he underwent surgery to reroute the nerve connections to his vocal cords and his voice functionality improved.

Adams announced on his daily podcast Real Coffee with Scott Adams in May 2025 at the age of 67 that he was diagnosed with stage IV prostate cancer which spread to his bones. He noted that taking ivermectin and fenbendazole to treat the cancer did not work. In June, he had prepared for physician-assisted suicide through the California End of Life Option Act, and had planned to go through with it after his stepdaughter's wedding at the end of the month, as the pain was too much to handle. At this point, he began taking testosterone blocker pills which caused his pain to abate. This medication was suggested initially but Adams had declined this treatment. This medication dropped his prostate-specific antigen (PSA) levels by 90%, which he said would prolong his life by between weeks and years.

In the autumn of 2025, Adams asked Donald Trump on social media for access to the cancer drug Pluvicto due to the rapid progression of his cancer. Robert F. Kennedy Jr. replied saying "How do I reach you? The President wants to help." While undergoing radiation therapy for the cancer, he was eventually paralyzed below the waist. Adams disclosed on Real Coffee in January 2026 about his ongoing heart failure diagnosis as well as the low chances of recovering from the cancer. He died while under hospice care at his Pleasanton home on January 13, 2026, at the age of 68. Trump would post on his Truth Social platform later that day to give his condolences to his family and thanked him for his support even when facing backlash from others.

== Legacy and recognition ==
Adams received recognition for his work, including the National Cartoonists Society Reuben Award and Newspaper Comic Strip Award for 1997 for his work on Dilbert. He was listed on the Thinkers50 Ranking of the 50 most influential management thinkers, placing 31st in 2001, 27th in 2003, 12th in 2005, and 21st in 2007. He received the Orwell Award in 1998 for his participation in "Mission Impertinent" for San Jose Mercury News West Magazine.

== Publications ==
=== Dilbert compilations ===
- Always Postpone Meetings with Time-Wasting Morons (1992), ISBN 0-88687-688-5
- Shave the Whales (1994), ISBN 0-8362-1740-3
- Bring Me the Head of Willy the Mailboy! (1995), ISBN 978-0-8362-1779-7
- It's Obvious You Won't Survive by Your Wits Alone (1995) ISBN 978-0-8362-1307-2
- Still Pumped from Using the Mouse (1996) ISBN 978-0-7522-2265-3
- Fugitive from the Cubicle Police (1996) ISBN 978-0-8362-2119-0
- Casual Day Has Gone Too Far (1997) ISBN 978-0-7522-1119-0
- I'm Not Anti-Business, I'm Anti-Idiot (1998), ISBN 0-8362-5182-2
- Journey to Cubeville (1998), ISBN 978-0-8362-6745-7
- Don't Step in the Leadership (1999), ISBN 0-8362-7844-5
- Random Acts of Management (2000), ISBN 978-0-7522-7174-3
- Excuse Me While I Wag (2001), ISBN 978-0-7407-1390-3
- When Did Ignorance Become a Point of View? (2001), ISBN 0-7407-1839-8
- Another Day in Cubicle Paradise (2002), ISBN 0-7407-2194-1
- All Dressed Down and Nowhere to Go (2002), ISBN 0-7407-2931-4 (Still Pumped from Using the Mouse, Casual Day Has Gone Too Far, and I'm Not Anti-Business, I'm Anti-Idiot combined)
- When Body Language Goes Bad: A Dilbert Book (2003), ISBN 978-0-7407-3298-0
- Words You Don't Want to Hear During Your Annual Performance Review (2003), ISBN 0-7407-3805-4
- Don't Stand Where the Comet Is Assumed to Strike Oil: A Dilbert Book (2004), ISBN 978-0-7407-4539-3
- The Fluorescent Light Glistens Off Your Head (2005), ISBN 978-0-7407-5113-4
- Thriving on Vague Objectives: A Dilbert Collection (2005), ISBN 978-0-7407-5533-0
- Try Rebooting Yourself: A Dilbert Collection (2006), ISBN 978-0-7407-6190-4
- Positive Attitude: A Dilbert Collection (2007), ISBN 978-0-7407-6379-3
- This Is the Part Where You Pretend to Add Value: A Dilbert Book (2008), ISBN 0-7407-7227-9
- Dilbert 2.0: 20 Years of Dilbert (2008), ISBN 978-0-7407-7735-6
- Freedom's Just Another Word for People Finding Out You're Useless (2009), ISBN 0-7407-7815-3
- 14 Years of Loyal Service in a Fabric-Covered Box: A Dilbert Book (2009), ISBN 0-7407-7365-8
- I'm Tempted to Stop Acting Randomly (2010), ISBN 978-0-7407-7806-3
- How's That Underling Thing Working Out for You? (2011), ISBN 1-4494-0819-2
- Teamwork Means You Can't Pick the Side that's Right (2012), ISBN 978-1-4494-1018-6
- Your New Job Title Is "Accomplice" (2013), ISBN 978-1-4494-3278-2
- I Sense a Coldness to Your Mentoring (2013), ISBN 978-1-4494-2938-6
- Go Add Value Someplace Else (2014), ISBN 1-4494-4660-4
- Optimism Sounds Exhausting (2015), ISBN 978-1-4494-6300-7
- I'm No Scientist, But I Think Feng Shui Is Part of the Answer: A Dilbert Book (2016), ISBN 978-1-4494-7196-5
- Dilbert Gets Re-accommodated (2017), ISBN 978-1-4494-8913-7
- Cubicles That Make You Envy the Dead (2018), ISBN 978-1-4494-9378-3
- Dilbert Turns 30 (2019), ISBN 978-1-5248-5182-8

=== Special compilations (annotated, favorites, etc.) ===
- Build a Better Life by Stealing Office Supplies: Dogbert's Big Book of Business (1991), ISBN 0-8362-1757-8
- Dogbert's Clues for the Clueless (1993), ISBN 0-8362-1737-3
- Seven Years of Highly Defective People: Scott Adams' Guided Tour of the Evolution of Dilbert (1997), ISBN 0-8362-3668-8
- Dilbert Gives You the Business (1999), ISBN 0-7407-4071-7
- Dilbert, a Treasury of Sunday Strips, Version 00 (2000), ISBN 978-0-7407-0531-1
- What Do You Call a Sociopath in a Cubicle? Answer: A Coworker (2002), ISBN 0-7407-2663-3
- It's Not Funny If I Have to Explain It: A Dilbert Book (2004), ISBN 0-7407-4658-8
- What Would Wally Do?: A Dilbert Treasury (2006), ISBN 978-0-7407-5769-3
- Cubes and Punishment: A Dilbert Book (2007), ISBN 978-0-7407-6837-8
- Problem Identified: And You're Probably Not Part of the Solution (2010), ISBN 0-7407-8534-6
- Your Accomplishments Are Suspiciously Hard to Verify (2011), ISBN 978-1-4494-0102-3
- I Can't Remember If We're Cheap or Smart: Dilbert (2012), ISBN 1-4494-2309-4

=== Other Dilbert books ===
- Telling It Like It Isn't (1996), ISBN 0-8362-1324-6
- You Don't Need Experience If You've Got Attitude (1996), ISBN 978-0-8362-2196-1
- Access Denied: Dilbert's Quest for Love in the Nineties (1996), ISBN 978-0-7522-2421-3
- Conversations With Dogbert (1996), ISBN 978-0-7522-1313-2
- Work Is a Contact Sport (1997), ISBN 978-0-8362-2878-6
- The Boss: Nameless, Blameless and Shameless (1997), ISBN 978-0-8362-3223-3
- The Dilbert Bunch (1997), ISBN 0-7522-1314-8
- No...You'd Better Watch Out! (1997), ISBN 978-0-8362-3739-9
- Please Don't Feed the Egos: And Other Tips for Corporate Survival (1997), ISBN 0-8362-3224-0
- Random Acts of Catness (1998), ISBN 978-0-8362-5277-4
- You Can't Schedule Stupidity (1998), ISBN 978-0-8362-5632-1
- Dilbert Meeting Book: Exceeding Tech Limits (1998), ISBN 978-0-7683-2029-9
- Dilbert Book Of Days: Trapped in a Dilbert World (1998), ISBN 0-7683-2030-5
- Work—The Wally Way (1999), ISBN 0-8362-7480-6
- Alice in Blunderland (1999), ISBN 0-8362-7479-2
- Dilbert Sudoku Comic Digest: 200 Puzzles Plus 50 Classic Dilbert Cartoons (2008), ISBN 0-7407-7250-3

=== Dilbert-related business publications ===
- Dilbert Newsletter (since 1994)
- The Dilbert Principle (1996), ISBN 0-88730-858-9
- Dogbert's Top Secret Management Handbook (1996), ISBN 978-0-88730-881-9
- The Dilbert Future: Thriving on Stupidity in the 21st Century (1997), ISBN 0-88730-866-X
- The Joy of Work (1998), ISBN 0-88730-871-6
- Dilbert and the Way of the Weasel (2002), ISBN 0-06-051805-7
- Slapped Together: The Dilbert Business Anthology (2002), ISBN 0-06-018621-6 (The Dilbert Principle, The Dilbert Future, and The Joy of Work, published together in one book)
- Dilbert's Guide to the Rest of Your Life: Dispatches from Cubicleland (2007), ISBN 0-7624-2781-7

=== Non-Dilbert publications ===
- God's Debris (2001), ISBN 0-7407-4787-8
- The Religion War (2004), ISBN 0-7407-4788-6
- Stick to Drawing Comics, Monkey Brain! (2007), ISBN 978-1-59184-185-2
- How to Fail at Almost Everything and Still Win Big (2013), ISBN 978-1-59184-774-8
- Win Bigly: Persuasion in a World Where Facts Don't Matter (2017), ISBN 978-0-7352-1971-7
- Loserthink: How Untrained Brains Are Ruining America (2019), ISBN 979-8-9905316-4-2
- Reframe Your Brain: The User Interface for Happiness and Success (2023), ISBN 979-8-9885349-0-7
- Win Bigly: Persuasion in a World Where Facts Don't Matter, 2nd edition (2024), ISBN 979-8-9905316-2-8
