= The Joy of Work =

1998 nonfiction book by Scott Adams

- Author: Scott Adams
- Publication date: 1998
- ISBN: 0887308716

The Joy of Work (1998) by Scott Adams is a two-part book. The first part offers recommendations as to how office workers can find happiness at their cubicle desks and the second part is a formula for creating humor, based on the author's experience penning the Dilbert comic strip.

== Synopsis ==
The title is a comic reference to the 1972 sex manual The Joy of Sex. The first part of the book explains "how to find happiness at the expense of your co-workers", including how to deal with superiors, meetings and co-workers and how to avoid work while having fun; an entire chapter is devoted to office pranks. The second part is an analysis of humor and how to write funny material. Adams writes, "The third part of the book is made entirely out of invisible pages. If the book seems heavier than it looks, that's why."

The book includes a response to Norman Solomon, who attempted to depict Scott Adams as a proponent of downsizing in his 1997 book, The Trouble with Dilbert. People who were offended by certain Dilbert strips are also addressed, with Adams concluding that it is the "proximity" of sensitive subjects to negative concepts that causes "people who are angry for no good reason (nuts)" to take offense.
