= God's Debris =

2001 novella by Scott Adams

- Cover of the 2004 republication
- Author: Scott Adams
- Language: English
- Publisher: Andrews McMeel Publishing, LLC
- Publication date: 2001
- Publication place: United States
- ISBN: 0-7407-4787-8
- OCLC: 56622703
- LC Class: MLCS 2006/02411 (B)
- Followed by: The Religion War

God's Debris: A Thought Experiment is a 2001 novella by Dilbert creator Scott Adams. The introduction disclaims any personal views held by the author, "The opinions and philosophies expressed by the characters are not my own, except by coincidence in a few spots not worth mentioning."

God's Debris espouses a philosophy based on the idea that the simplest explanation tends to be the best. The book proposes a form of pandeism and monism, postulating that an omnipotent God annihilated Itself in the Big Bang, because an omniscient entity would already know everything possible except its own lack of existence, and existed since as the smallest units of matter and the law of probability, or "God's debris".

A 2004 sequel, The Religion War, continued the theme, and was later repackaged with the original book and an additional short story in a single volume.

== Synopsis ==
The main character, the Avatar, defines God as primordial matter (like quarks and leptons) and the law of probability. He offers recommendations on everything from an alternative theory for planetary motion to successful recipes for relationships under his system. He proposes that God is reassembling himself through the continuing formation of a collective intelligence in the form of the human race, modern examples of which include the development of the internet; this is related to the idea of the Omega Point. In the introduction, Adams describes God's Debris as a thought experiment, challenging readers to differentiate its scientifically accepted theories from "creative baloney designed to sound true" and to "[t]ry to figure out what's wrong with the simplest explanation".

=== Levels of consciousness ===
The chapter "Fifth Level" (p. 124) describes five levels of human awareness, or consciousness.

- Level 1: Consciousness at birth: pure innocence, self-awareness.
- Level 2: Awareness of others, and acceptance of authority (a belief system).
- Level 3: Awareness that some beliefs may be wrong, but not sure which ones.
- Level 4: Skepticism and adoption of the scientific method.
- Level 5: Avatar level, understanding that the human mind is a delusion-generating machine, and that science is another belief system, albeit a useful one.

== Philosophical roots ==
The book subscribes to the Lakoffian point of view, in that the mind is viewed as a "delusion generator" rather than a window to true understanding. As George Lakoff said: "Our ordinary conceptual system, in terms of which we both think and act, is fundamentally metaphorical in nature." The particular philosophy espoused has been identified as a form of pandeism, the concept that a god created the universe by becoming the universe.

== Publication ==
Given Adams' fame as the author of the Dilbert comics, publishers were wary of publishing any book by Adams without Dilbert content. The book was therefore released initially as an e-book in 2001, with comparatively small "publishing" costs. It was released in hard-cover format in 2004. In 2023, Adams announced in a pinned tweet that he had re-published the book for free for his subscribers, and would shortly publish an AI-voiced audiobook version.

== Sequel: The Religion War ==
The Religion War
- Author: Scott Adams
- Language: English
- Publisher: Andrews McMeel Publishing, LLC
- Publication date: 2004
- Publication place: United States
- ISBN: 0-7407-4788-6
- Preceded by: God's Debris

The Religion War (ISBN 0-7407-4788-6) is a 2004 sequel to God's Debris taking place right before the last chapter of that book. Adams has asserted that it is his two religion-themed novels, and not Dilbert, that "will be his ultimate legacy".

=== Plot summary ===
The delivery boy from the first book, who is now the Avatar, must stop an epic clash of civilizations between the Western world, led by Christian extremist General Horatio Cruz, and the Middle East, led by Muslim extremist Al-Zee. To accomplish this task, the Avatar decides to find the "Prime Influencer", a person who, he feels, can indirectly influence all the decisions people make by virtue of responsibility, from fashion to the election of the President. He attempts to do so by enlisting a talented and arrogant programmer at Global Information Corporation (G.I.C.) (an all-encompassing, world-wide future sort of T.I.A. created out of fear of terrorism) to analyze G.I.C.'s massive databases. Also, people's phones are, in the name of preventing terrorist communications, restricted to only calling certain contacts a person has that have been approved by the Department of Communications; this fact ultimately comes back in the book's climax.

The Avatar applies his unparalleled ability to identify developing patterns and accurately determine the most probable results of a situation to accurately predict the war plans of both Cruz and Al-Zee. He subsequently uses his ability to recognize even the vaguest patterns (which makes him seem to know more than he actually does) to bypass guards, escape interrogations, and ultimately win an audience with the warring leaders.

Ultimately, the Avatar fails to stop the coming of the war. However, at the conclusion of the book, the Prime Influencer, who turns out to be an opinionated café owner whom the Avatar had met previously by chance, launches a simple, yet catchy, phrase (If God is so smart, why do you fart?) that spreads throughout the world like a virus thanks to an advanced computer worm, named Giver-of-Data (G.o.D.), launched by the G.I.C. programmer shortly before his death, which unlocked everyone's phones, linked them to automatic translation systems, and disabled call-billing. According to the story, "Once you heard it, you could never forget it." It was this phrase that finally captured the collective imaginations of ordinary people, causing them to reevaluate the basis of their notions of a god. This ultimately led to the elimination of fundamentalist religious practices throughout the world, which, in turn, resulted in the end of the Religion War.

=== Reception ===
One review observes:

The second novella, a follow-up titled The Religion War, describes a civilizational conflict in 2040 between a violent caliphate in the Middle East and a Christian alliance in the West. The hard-nosed hero builds a wall around the jihadists and "essentially kills everybody there", Adams told me. "I have to be careful, because I'm talking about something pretty close to genocide, so I'm not saying I prefer it, I'm saying I predict it."

Another notes: "In this frenetically paced sequel to Adams' best-selling 'thought experiment', God's Debris, the smartest man in the world is on a mission to stop a cataclysmic war between Christian and Muslim forces and save civilization."

== See also ==
- Brahman
- Advaita Vedanta
- The Footprints of God, novel written by author Greg Iles.
- Eureka: A Prose Poem, work by Edgar Allan Poe.
- The Last Question, short story by author Isaac Asimov.
- God becomes the Universe
- Occam's razor
- Philipp Mainländer
