= Evangelical Seminaries of Maulbronn and Blaubeuren =

Coordinates: 49°00′05″N 8°48′46″E

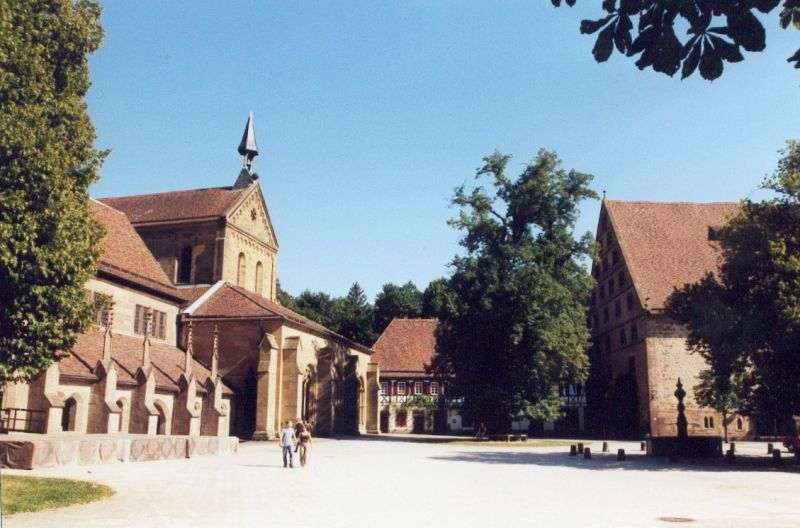
Maulbronn courtyard and church

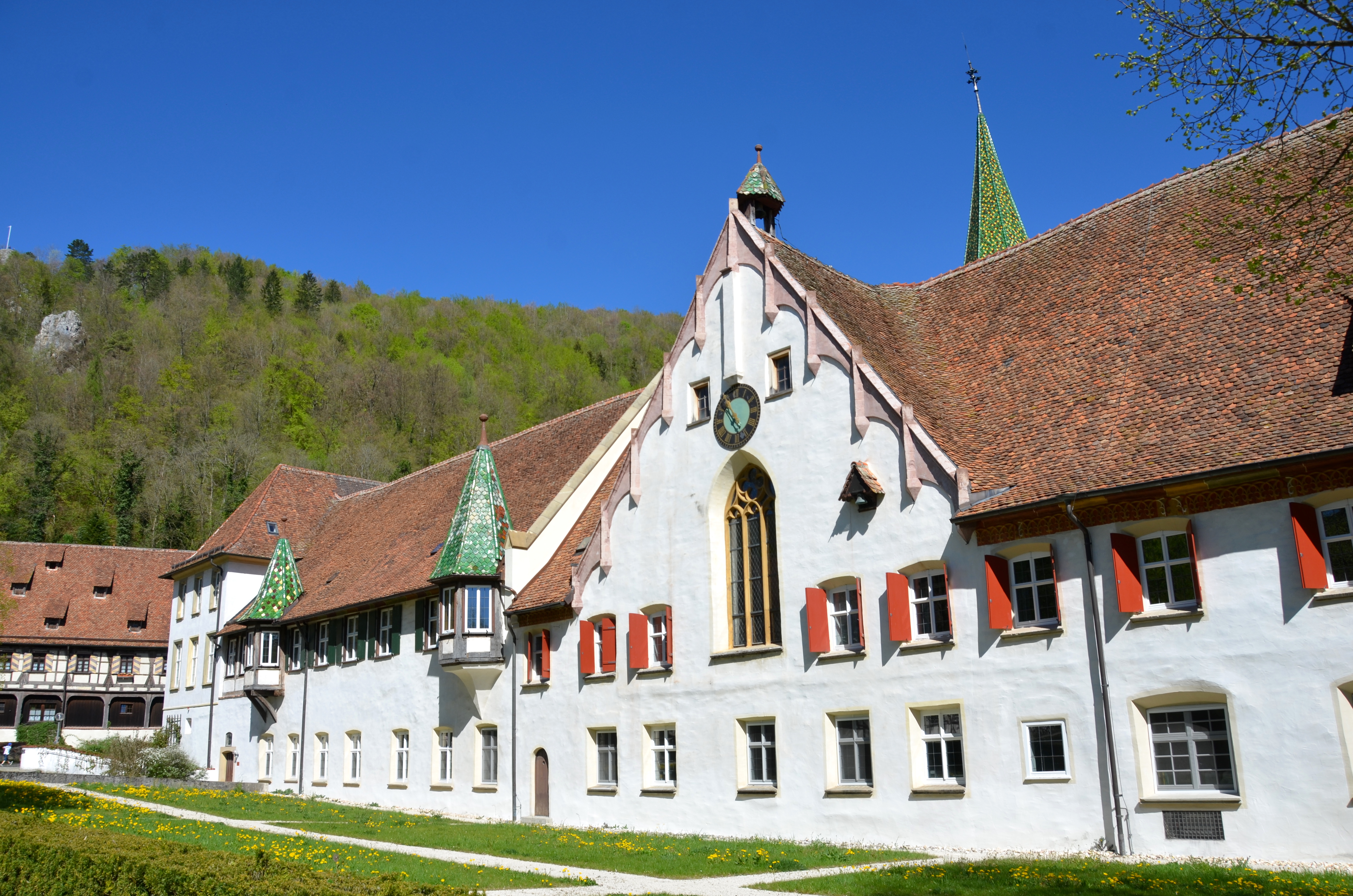
Blaubeuren Abbey, Evangelical Seminary

The Evangelical Seminaries of Maulbronn and Blaubeuren (German: Evangelischen Seminare Maulbronn und Blaubeuren) in Baden-Württemberg, Germany, are two Gymnasien (high schools) and Protestant boarding schools in the Württemberg tradition.

Until 2008, grades 9 and 10 were taught in the former Maulbronn Abbey, and Grades 11 through 13 in Blaubeuren, partly in cooperation with the Gymnasium Blaubeuren ("Blaubeuren High School"). As of 2013, the two schools exist independently of each other. While both schools share their commitment to classical (Latin, Greek and Hebrew) and modern languages, music and religious education, the Maulbronn seminary especially focuses on the European culture tradition, whereas Blaubeuren places special emphasis on internationalism and the interdisciplinary dialogue between theology and science.

The seminaries were founded as Protestant schools in 1556 by Christoph von Württemberg in order to provide a broad education for gifted boys. Since the schools first admitted girls in 1969, the seminaries have become a leading co-educational boarding school for talented pupils.

== Alumni ==
The alumni of the seminary have included:

- Georg Herwegh
- Hermann Hesse, who set part of his 1906 novel Beneath the Wheel here
- Friedrich Hölderlin
- Johannes Kepler
- Otto Kirn
- Hermann Kurz
- Eduard Mörike
- Eduard Zeller
