= Stick to Drawing Comics, Monkey Brain! =

2007 book by Scott Adams

Stick to Drawing Comics, Monkey Brain!: Cartoonist Ignores Helpful Advice
- Author: Scott Adams
- Language: English
- Publisher: Portfolio Hardcover
- Publication date: 2007
- Publication place: United States
- Pages: 368
- ISBN: 978-1-59184-185-2
- OCLC: 123818305
- Dewey Decimal: 741.5/6973 B 22
- LC Class: PN6727.A3 A3 2007

Stick to Drawing Comics, Monkey Brain!: Cartoonist Ignores Helpful Advice is a book by Scott Adams, creator of Dilbert.

The book consists of some of Adams' blog posts and entries. As there are many topics in the book, the content of the chapters jumps abruptly from one subject to another. Parts of the blog were withdrawn from the website during the writing of the book.

According to Booklist:

Taken from Adam's Dilbert blog, he offers more than 150 short pieces covering every slice of life beyond the workplace, such as tips on how not to dance like a dork, comic relief on the fears of terrorism, the not-so-subtle differences between men and women, embarrassing public-bathroom moments, appropriate uses for your own clone, and so on.
