= God becomes the universe =

Theological doctrine

The belief that God became the universe is a theological doctrine that has been developed several times historically, and holds that the creator of the universe actually became the universe. Historically, for versions of this theory where God has ceased to exist or to act as a separate and conscious entity, some have used the term pandeism, which combines aspects of pantheism and deism, to refer to such a theology. A similar concept is panentheism, which has the creator become the universe only in part, but remain in some other part transcendent to it, as well. Hindu texts like the Mandukya Upanishad speak of the undivided one which became the universe.

== Development ==
=== In mythology ===
Many ancient mythologies suggested that the world was created from the physical substance of a dead deity or a being of similar power. In Babylonian mythology, the young god Marduk slew Tiamat and created the known world from her body. Similarly, Norse mythology posited that Odin and his brothers, Vili and Vé, slew the frost giant Ymir and then created the world from his corpse. Chinese mythology of the Three Kingdoms era recounts the creation of elements of the physical world (mountains, rivers, the sun and moon, etc.) from the body of a creator called Pángǔ (盤古). Such stories did not go so far as to identify the designer of the world as being one as having used his or her own body to provide the material.

But, one such example exists in Polynesian myth, for in the islands of the Pacific, the idea of Supreme Deity manifests in divinities that Māori people call Rangi and Papa, Native Hawaiians Kāne, the Tongans and Samoans Tagaloa, and the peoples of the Society Islands call Ta'aroa. A native poetic definition of the Creator relates: "He was; Taaroa was his name; he abode in the void. No earth, no sky, no men. Taaroa calls, but nought answers; and alone existing, he became the universe. The props are Taaroa; the rocks are Taaroa; the sands are Taaroa; it is thus he himself is named."

=== Ancient philosophy ===
Religious studies professor, Francis Edward Peters traced this idea to the philosophy of the Milesians, who had also pioneered knowledge of pantheism, in his 1967 Greek Philosophical Terms: A Historical Lexicon, noting that "[w]hat appeared... at the center of the Pythagorean tradition in philosophy, is another view of psyche that seems to owe little or nothing to the pan-vitalism or pan-deism that is the legacy of the Milesians.

Milesian philosopher Anaximander in particular favored the use of rational principles to contend that everything in the world was formed of variations of a single substance (apeiron), which had been temporarily liberated from the primal state of the world. Friedrich Nietzsche, in his Philosophy in the Tragic Age of the Greeks, stated that Anaximander viewed "...all coming-to-be as though it were an illegitimate emancipation from eternal being, a wrong for which destruction is the only penance." Anaximander was among the material monists, along with Thales, who believed that everything was composed of water, Anaximenes, who believed it was air, and Heraclitus, who believed it to be fire.

Gottfried Große in his 1787 interpretation of Pliny the Elder’s Natural History, describes Pliny, a first-century figure, as a pandeist as well.

In the 9th century, Johannes Scotus Eriugena proposed in his great work, De divisione naturae (also called Periphyseon, probably completed around 867 AD), that the nature of the universe is divisible into four distinct classes:

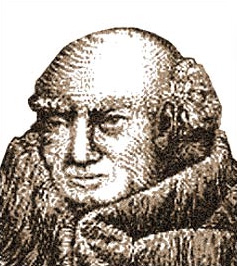
Johannes Scotus Eriugena was among the first to propose that God became the universe, and did so to learn something about itself.

1. that which creates and is not created;
2. that which is created and creates;
3. that which is created and does not create;
4. that which neither is created nor creates.

The first is God as the ground or origin of all things, the last is God as the final end or goal of all things, that into which the world of created things ultimately returns. One particularly controversial point made by Eriugena was that God was "nothing", in that God could not fall into any earthly classification. Eriugena followed the argument of Pseudo-Dionysius and from neo-Platonists such as Gaius Marius Victorinus that because God was above being, God was not a being: "So supremely perfect is the essence of the Divinity that God is incomprehensible not only to us but also to Himself. For if He knew Himself in any adequate sense He should place Himself in some category of thought, which would be to limit Himself."

Eriugena depicts God as an evolving being, developing through the four stages that he outlines. The second and third classes together compose the created universe, which is the manifestation of God, God in process, Theophania; the second being the world of Platonic ideas or forms. The third is the physical manifestation of God, having evolved through the realm of ideas and made those ideas seem to be matter, and may be pantheistic or pandeistic, depending on the interference attributed to God in the universe:

[God] enters... the realm of space and time, where the ideas become subject to multiplicity, change, imperfection, and decay. In this last stage they are no longer pure ideas but only the appearances of reality, that is phenomena. ... In the realm of space and time the ideas take on the burden of matter, which is the source of suffering, sickness, and sin. The material world, therefore, of our experience is composed of ideas clothed in matter — here Eriugena attempts a reconciliation of Platonism with Aristotelean notions. Man, too, is composed of idea and matter, soul and body. He is the culmination of the process of things from God, and with him, as we shall see, begins the process of return of all things to God.

The divine system is thus distinguished by beginning, middle and end; but these are in essence one; the difference is only the consequence of man's temporal limitations. This eternal process is viewed with finite comprehension through the form of time, forcing the application of temporal distinctions to that which is extra- or supra-temporal. Eriugena concludes this work with another controversial argument, and one that had already been scathingly rejected by Augustine of Hippo, that "[n]ot only man, however, but everything else in nature is destined to return to God." Eriugena's work was condemned by a council at Sens by Honorius III (1225), who described it as "swarming with worms of heretical perversity," and by Pope Gregory XIII in 1585. Such theories were thus suppressed for hundreds of years thence.

=== 16th century on ===
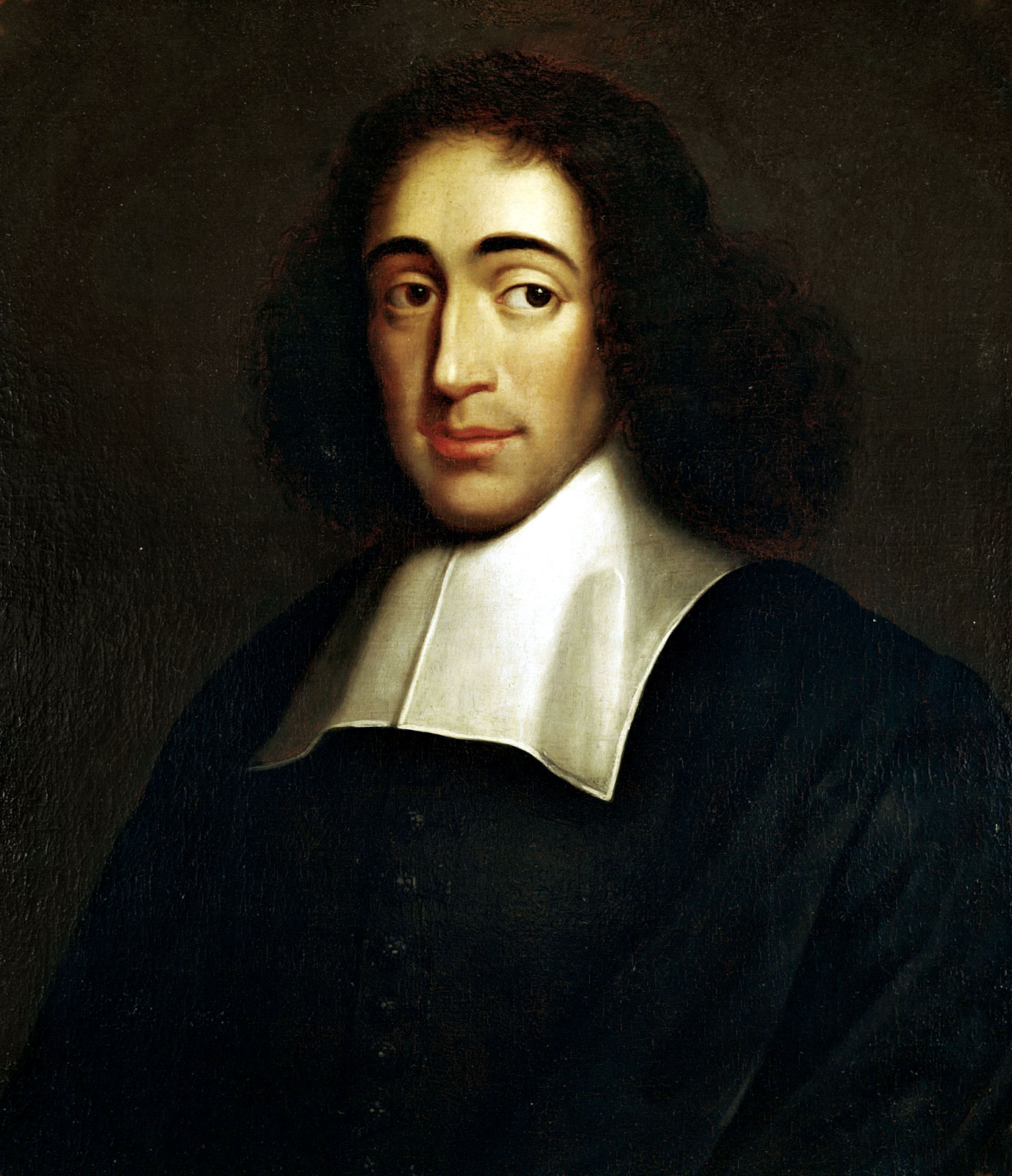
The ideas of Spinoza lay the foundations for pandeism.

Giordano Bruno conceived of a God who was immanent in nature, and for this very purpose was uninterested in human affairs (all such events being equally part of God). However, it was Baruch Spinoza in the 17th century who appears to have been the earliest to use deistic reason to arrive at the conception of a pantheistic God. Spinoza's God was deistic in the sense that it could only be proved by appeal to reason, but it was also one with the universe.

Spinoza's pantheistic focus on the universe as it already existed, was unlike Eriugena's. It did not address the possible creation of the universe from the substance of God, as Spinoza rejected the very possibility of changes in the form of matter required as a premise for such a belief.

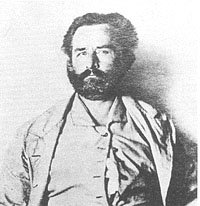
Franz Wilhelm Junghuhn was the first to articulate a pantheistic deism.

18th-century British philosopher Thomas Paine also approached this territory in his great philosophical treatise, The Age of Reason, although Paine was concentrated on the deistic aspects of his inquiry. According to the Encyclopedia of American Philosophy "Later Unitarian Christians (such as William Ellery Channing), transcendentalists (such as Ralph Waldo Emerson and Henry David Thoreau), writers (such as Walt Whitman) and some pragmatists (such as William James) took a more pantheist or pandeist approach by rejecting views of God as separate from the world." It was Dutch naturalist Franz Wilhelm Junghuhn who first specifically detailed a religious philosophy incorporating deism and pantheism, in his four volume treatise, Java, seine Gestalt, Pflanzendecke, und sein innerer Bau (Images of Light and Shadow from Java's interior) released anonymously between 1850 and 1854. Junghuhn's book was banned for a time in Austria and parts of Germany as an attack on Christianity. In 1884, theologian Sabine Baring-Gould would contend that Christianity itself demanded that the seemingly irreconcilable elements of pantheism and deism must be combined:

This world is either the idea or it is the workmanship of God. If we say that it is the idea,--then we are Pantheists, if we say that it is the work, then we are Deists... But how, it may be asked, can two such opposite theories as Pantheism and Deism be reconciled,--they mutually exclude one another? I may not be able to explain how they are conciliable, but I boldly affirm that each is simultaneously true, and that each must be true, for each is an inexorably logical conclusion, and each is a positive conclusion, and all positive conclusions must be true if Christ be the Ideal and the focus of all truths.

Within a decade after that, Andrew Martin Fairbairn similarly wrote that "both Deism and Pantheism err because they are partial; they are right in what they affirm, wrong in what they deny. It is as antitheses that they are false; but by synthesis they may be combined or dissolved into truth." Ironically, Fairbairn's criticism concluded that it was the presence of an active God that was missing from both concepts, rather than the rational explanation of God's motives and appearance of absence.

In 1838, Italian phrenologist Luigi Ferrarese in Memorie Riguardanti la Dottrina Frenologica ("Thoughts Regarding the Doctrine of Phrenology") attacked the philosophy of Victor Cousin as a doctrine which "locates reason outside the human person, declaring man a fragment of God, introducing a sort of spiritual Pandeism, absurd for us, and injurious to the Supreme Being." Cousin had often been identified as a pantheist, but it was said that he repudiated that label on the basis that unlike Spinoza, Cousin asserted that "he does not hold with Spinoza and the Eleatics that God is a pure substance, and not a cause."

Helena Petrovna Blavatsky observed this:

In the Mandukya Upanishad it is written, "As a spider throws out and retracts its web, as herbs spring up in the ground . . . so is the Universe derived from the undecaying one," Brahma, for the "Germ of unknown Darkness", is the material from which all evolves and develops, "as the web from the spider, as foam from the water," etc. This is only graphic and true, if the term Brahma, the "Creator", is derived from the root brih, to increase or expand. Brahma "expands", and becomes the Universe woven out of his own substance.

Mid-19th century German-Jewish philosopher, Philipp Mainländer theorized the world was created through "God killing himself," wherein the origin of existence can be attributed to a singularity, referred to by Mainländer as "God" in a pseudo-metaphorical sense, dispersing itself to create spatiotemporality in an attempt to elude existence, being that this singularity ("God") has an ontology of existing, and thus can only escape it through becoming entities wherein this nature is not to be found. Mainländer, inspired by Arthur Schopenhauer's will to live, theorized of the "will to death," a desire for annihilation inherent to the beings created by Mainländer's "God".

=== Developments from the 20th century to today ===
In the 1940s, process theologian Charles Hartshorne identified pandeism as one of his many models of the possible nature of God, acknowledging that a God capable of change (as Hartshorne insisted God must be) is consistent with pandeism. Hartshorne preferred pandeism to pantheism, explaining that "it is not really the theos that is described." However, he specifically rejected pandeism early on in favor of a God whose characteristics included "absolute perfection in some respects, relative perfection in all others" or "AR", writing that this theory "is able consistently to embrace all that is positive in either deism or pandeism." Hartshorne accepted the label of panentheism for his beliefs, declaring that "panentheistic doctrine contains all of deism and pandeism except their arbitrary negations."

In 2001, Scott Adams published God's Debris: A Thought Experiment, in which a fictional character puts forth a radical form of kenosis, surmising that an omnipotent God annihilated himself in the Big Bang, because God would already know everything possible except his own lack of existence, and would have to end that existence in order to complete his knowledge. Adams' protagonist asks about God, "would his omnipotence include knowing what happens after he loses his omnipotence, or would his knowledge of the future end at that point?" He proceeds from this question to the following analysis:

A God who knew the answer to that question would indeed know everything and have everything. For that reason he would be unmotivated to do anything or create anything. There would be no purpose to act in any way whatsoever. But a God who had one nagging question—what happens if I cease to exist?—might be motivated to find the answer in order to complete his knowledge. ... The fact that we exist is proof that God is motivated to act in some way. And since only the challenge of self-destruction could interest an omnipotent God, it stands to reason that we... are God's debris.

Adams' God exists now as a combination of the smallest units of energy of which the universe is made (many levels smaller than quarks), which Adams called "God Dust", and the law of probability, or "God's debris", hence the title. The protagonist further proposes that God is in the process of being restored not through some process such as the Big Crunch, but because humankind itself is becoming God.

The 1976 Simon Raven novel, The Survivors includes an exchange between characters where one observes, "God became the universe. Therefore the universe is God." while the other counters:

In becoming the universe God abdicated. He destroyed himself as God. He turned what he had been, his true self, into nullity and thereby forfeited the Godlike qualities which pertained to him. The universe which he has become is also his grave. He has no control in it or over it. God, as God, is dead.

=== Criticisms ===
Some theologians have criticised the notion of a Creator wholly becoming the universe. An example is William Walker Atkinson, in his Mastery of Being:

It will be seen that this fact of the Immutability of REALITY, when clearly conceived, must serve to confute and refute the erroneous theories of certain schools of Pantheism which hold that "God becomes the Universe by changing into the Universe." Thus it is sought to identify Nature with God, whereby, as Schopenhauer said, "you show God to the door." If God changes Himself into The Phenomenal Universe, then God is non-existent and we need not concern ourselves any more about Him, for he has committed suicide by Change. In such case there is no God, no Infinite, no Immutable, no Eternal; everything has become finite, temporal, separate, a mere union of diverse finite parts. In that case are we indeed adrift in the Ocean of Diversity. We have lost our Foundation of REALITY, and are but ever-changing "parts" of physical things governed by physical laws. Then, indeed, would be true the idea of some of the old philosophies that "there is No Being; merely a Becoming." Then would there, in truth, be nothing constant, the universe never the same for two consecutive moments, with no permanent ground of REALITY to support it. But the reason of man, the very essence of his mental being, refuses to so think of That-which-IS. In his heart of hearts he recognizes the existence of THAT-WHICH-CHANGES-NOT, THAT-WHICH-IS-ETERNAL, THAT-WHICH-IS-REALITY.
....
Moreover, the idea of the immutability of REALITY must, serve to confute the erroneous idea of certain schools of metaphysics which assert the existence of "an Evolving God"; that is, a God which increases in intelligence, nature, and being by reason of the change of the universe, which is an expression of Himself. This conception is that of a Supreme Being who is growing, developing, and increasing in efficiency, wisdom, power, and character. This is an attempt to combine the anthropomorphic deity and the pantheistic Nature-God. The conception is clearly anthropomorphic, as it seeks to attribute to God the qualities and characteristics of man. It defies every fact of Ultimate Principle of REALITY. It is extremely unphilosophical and will not stand the test of logical examination.

He claims that if God were evolving or improving, being an infinite being, it would have to be traceable back to some point of having "an infinitely undeveloped state and condition." But, this claim was made prior to the rise of scientific knowledge pinpointing the beginning of the universe in time, and connecting time with space, so that time would not exist as we know it prior to the universe existing. In Islam, a criticism is raised, wherein it is argued that "from the juristic standpoint, obliterating the distinctions between God and the universe necessarily entails that in effect there can be no Sharia, since the deontic nature of the Law presupposes the existence of someone who commands (amir) and others who are the recipients of the command (ma'mur), namely God and his subjects."

In 1996, Pastor Bob Burridge of the Genevan Institute for Reformed Studies wrote in his Survey Studies in Reformed Theology an essay on "The Decrees of God," also identifying the notion of God becoming the universe as incompatible with Christianity:

All the actions of created intelligences are not merely the actions of God. He has created a universe of beings which are said to act freely and responsibly as the proximate causes of their own moral actions. When individuals do evil things it is not God the Creator and Preserver acting. If God was the proximate cause of every act it would make all events to be "God in motion." That is nothing less than pantheism, or more exactly, pandeism.

Burridge disagrees that such is the case, decrying that "The Creator is distinct from his creation. The reality of secondary causes is what separates Christian theism from pandeism." Burridge concludes by challenging his reader to determine why "calling God the author of sin demand[s] a pandeistic understanding of the universe effectively removing the reality of sin and moral law."

== Compatibility with scientific and philosophical proofs ==
Stephen Hawking's determination that the universe (and others) needed no Creator to come about inspired the response from Deepak Chopra, interviewed by Larry King, that:

He says in the book that at least 10 to the power of 500 universes could possibly exist in super position of possibility at this level, which to me suggests an omniscient being. The only difference I have was God did not create the universe, God became the universe.

Chopra insists that Hawking's discoveries speak only to the nature of God, not to its existence.

=== The God Theory ===
Physicist Bernard Haisch has published two books expressing such a model of the universe. The first was the 2006 book entitled The God Theory, in which he writes:

I offer a genuine insight into how you can, and should, be a rational, science-believing human being and at the same time know that you are also an immortal spiritual being, a spark of God. I propose a worldview that offers a way out of the hate and fear-driven violence engulfing the planet.

Haisch published a followup in 2010, The Purpose-Guided Universe. Both books reject both atheism and traditional theistic viewpoints, favoring instead a model wherein the deity has become the universe, to share in the actualized experiences therein manifested. Haisch provides as proof of his views a combination of fine tuning and mystical experiences arguments. Haisch additionally points to the peculiar capabilities of persons with autism and like defects of the brain experiencing savant syndrome, and especially having the ability to perform complex mathematical calculations. Haisch contends that this is consistent with humans being fragments of a supreme power, with their minds acting as filters to reduce that power to a comprehensible experience, and with the savantic mind having a broken filter which allows access to the use of greater capacities.

Alan Dawe's 2011 book The God Franchise, likewise proposes the human experience as being a temporarily segregated sliver of the experience of God.

== See also ==
- Cosmic Man
- Creative Evolution, Henri Bergson, Chapter IV
- God's Debris
- Open individualism
