= Luigi Ferrarese =

Italian physician (1795–1855)

- Born: 12 December 1795; Brienza, Basilicata
- Died: 8 August 1855 (aged 59); Naples, Campania
- Scientific career
- Fields: Medicine; Phrenology

Luigi Ferrarese (12 December 1795 – 8 August 1855) was an Italian medical doctor and the leading proponent of phrenology in Italy in the nineteenth century.

== Biography ==
He was born at Brienza, in the province of Potenza, to Nicola and Antonia Contardi. He received his first education in a Piarist school in Naples, studying Italian literature, Greek and Latin. After he graduated in medicine (1817), Ferrarese began to work at the Maddalena lunatic asylum (Aversa) with the noted pioneer of psychiatry Biagio Miraglia, and gave private lessons.

He was a member of several institutions such as the Scientific Academies of Naples, Turin, Bologna, Padua and a corresponding member of the Phrenological Society of Paris. In 1848, he was elected as a deputy for the district of Potenza at the Neapolitan Parliament but, because of his liberal ideas, was constantly monitored by the Bourbon police.

Ferrarese died in 1855, stricken with typhoid fever.

== Theories ==
He published a half dozen works on phrenology (the belief that personality traits could be determined by examining the dimensions of a person's skull) between 1830 and 1838. His chief work on the subject, Memorie Risguardanti La Dottrina Frenologica (1836-8), was "one of the fundamental 19th century works in the field". His work was initially met with approval by the Church. His writings published after his 1838 opus without the necessary permission from the state ran him afoul of ecclesiastical authorities, resulting in persecution, and even imprisonment.

Among his writings, Ferrarese advocated for a government embrace of phrenology as a scientific means of conquering many social ills. An 1835 study of suicide, "Della Monomania Suicida" ("Suicidal Monomania") concluded that government regulations punishing the families of suicides were "absurd and unjust" as they failed to prevent the ill while punishing the innocent. In 1838, in the course of defending his beliefs, Ferrarese was among the earliest persons identified to expressly address and criticize Pandeism: The belief that God became the Universe and that human beings are therefore "fragments" of God. Ferrarese said the theory 'profaned the mysteries of theology'.

In March 1844, Ferrarese was visited by noted Scottish phrenologist George Combe, who had earlier read and been impressed by Ferrarese's Memorie Risguardanti La Dottrina Frenologica. At the time of his initial reading of the work, Combe had written:

Even Italy sends forth her testimony that phrenology has reached her shores. On my return from America in June last, I found awaiting me a little work entitled 'Memoirs regarding the Doctrine of Phrenology and other Sciences connected with it,' by Dr Luigi Ferrarese, Professor of Medicine in Naples, read before the Royal Academy of Sciences in that city. It was published with full permission from the royal censor of the press. The censor in his report on the work certifies that it 'is very instructive and useful, and contains nothing offensive to religion or to the rights of kings.'

On his visit to Naples, Combe reported first a difficulty in finding Ferrarese and discovered the doctor to living in obscurity. Combe described the situation:

I found him in circumstances which indicated much depression, both physical and mental. He spoke with interest of Phrenology, and said that he had projected a Phrenological Journal, but knew that he would be stopped by the Government. He wished to shew the importance of the science in insanity, criminal legislation, education, and social arrangements; but in Naples there was no outlet for knowledge. Altogether, I have never had an interview with any phrenologist, foreign or British, who excited so strong a feeling of sympathy and regret, mingled with respect for his intellectual acquirements, as did Dr Ferrarese.

On a second visit, Combe ascertained the cause of Ferrarese's depressed condition:

On 10th February 1839, he commenced a periodical, named "Il Gatto Letterato, Foglio periodico," dated in Capolago (a town in Italian Switzerland), but printed at Naples (without licence); and for a "Lettera di un Frenologo ad un Dottore degli Stati Pontifici" ("Letter from a Phrenologist to a Doctor in the Papal States"), he was called before the Santa Sede (Holy Tribunal); and afterwards, in 1840, for several other articles, he was seized and imprisoned for 28 days. He was suspended from his office of physician in ordinary to the Royal Lunatic Asylum at Aversa, and crushed to the earth by every engine of persecution which bigotry and tyranny, combined, could employ against Him.

== Works ==
- Delle malattie della mente ovvero delle diverse specie di follie: Vol.1 (1830)
- Delle malattie della mente ovvero delle diverse specie di follie: Vol.2 (1832)
- Della monomania suicida (1835)
- Memorie risguardanti la dottrina frenologica (1838)
- Opuscoli sopra svariati scientifici argomenti (1838)
- Ricerche intorno all'origine dell'istinto (1838)
- Quistioni medico-legali intorno alle diverse specie di follie (1843)
- Nuove ricerche di sublime Psicologia medico-forense (1845)
