= How to Fail at Almost Everything and Still Win Big =

Book by Scott Adams

How to Fail at Almost Everything and Still Win Big: Kind of the Story of My Life
- Hardcover, 1st edition
- Author: Scott Adams
- Language: English
- Subject: Self-Help
- Genre: Non-fiction
- Publisher: Portfolio
- Publication date: October 22, 2013
- Publication place: United States
- Media type: Print, e-book
- Pages: 247 pp
- ISBN: 978-1591847748

How to Fail at Almost Everything and Still Win Big: Kind of the Story of My Life is a 2013 nonfiction book by Scott Adams, creator of Dilbert. Adams shares many of the techniques and theories from his life which he believes can increase a person's likelihood of success.

The book has been reviewed by Forbes India and the Dallas News.

== See also ==
- Robert Cialdini
