= Carlos Wiesse Portocarrero =

Peruvian scholar and historian

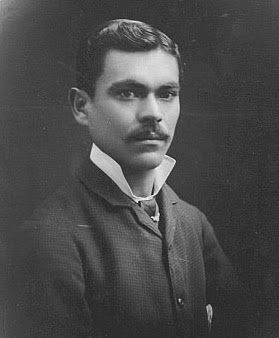
Portrait of Carlos Wiesse Portocarrero

Carlos Wiesse Portocarrero (1859–1945) was a Peruvian scholar and historian. He was born in Tacna on September 4, 1859 and died in Lima on June 17, 1945. His parents were Carlos Wiesse and Jesús Portocarrero.

== Education ==
Portocarrero started his primary education studies in the Tacna School, which was founded by his father and directed by Van Broeck. He emigrated with his family to Cocabamba in 1870 due to an epidemic of yellow fever. He completed his primary education at the Dos de Mayo School in that city. In 1871 he started secondary school in Lima at the English College, completing it at the San Marcos University. He received his Bachelor of Law in 1879.

== Career ==
In 1880 Portocarrero was nominated civil deputy to the Peruvian Legation in Ecuador. After returning to Peru in 1881 he founded the Chiclayo Institute in the city of Chiclayo in collaboration with Frederick Edulino.

== Works ==
- Apuntaciones sobre el plebiscito pactado en el artículo 3 del Tratado de Ancón, puestas en forma de exposición al árbitro designado en el protocolo Billinghurst-Latorre del 16 de abril de 1898 (English: Notes on the plebiscite pact in Article 3 of the Treaty of Ancon, in the form of an exposure to the arbitrator appointed in the Billinghurst-Latorre protocol of April 16, 1898). -- Lausana: G. Bridel Press, 1898.
- Curso de geografía (English: Geography course). -- Lima : F. and E. Rosay, 1900 (Other ed. 1913, 1922?, 1924,).
- La cuestíon de límites entre el Perú y el Brasil (English: The question of limits between Peru and Brazil). -- Lima: La Industria Press, 1904.
- Fundamentos del recurso de nulidad interpuesto contra el auto de la Iltma en el juicio que sigue con D. Felipe Pardo sobre rendición de cuentas (rectificación del peritaje) (English: Fundamentals of the appeal filed against the Iltma order - High Court of Trujillo by D. Santiago L. González at trial that followed D. Felipe Pardo on accountability (rectification of expertise). -- Lima: Torres Aguirre Press, 1906.
- Elementos de instrucción moral y cívica (English: Elements of moral and civic education). -- Lima : Libr. Francesa Científica Galland, E. Rosay, 1907 (1910, 1913, 1926).
- Extractos de sociología (English: Extracts of Sociology). -- Lima: P. Berrio, 1907(Other edition 1908).
- Historia y civilización del Perú, para las escuelas de instrucción primaria (English: History and civilization of Peru, for primary education schools). -- Lima : Libr. and Casa Edit. Galland, 1908.
- Apuntes de historia crítica del Perú, época colonial (English: Notes on the critical history of Peru, colonial period). -- Lima : E. Rosay, 1909.
- Exposición sobre el estado de la instrucción pública en el Perú, que el ministerio del ramo envía al congreso panamericano de Chile (English: Presentation on the state of public education in Peru, that the corresponding ministry sent to Pan-American Congress of Chile). -- Lima: Torres Aguirre Press, 1909.
- Los educadores españoles que han influido en la cultura intelectual del Perú emancipado (English: Spanish educators who have influenced the intellectual culture of emancipated Peru). -- Lima : Sanmartí and Cía, [1909].
- Las civilizaciones primitivas del Perú (English: Early Peruvian civilizations ). -- Lima : Tip. El Lucero, 1913.
- Derecho usual (English: Common law). -- Lima: Sanmartí, 1914.
- Geografía del Perú (English: The Geography of Peru). -- Lima: E. Rosay, 1914.
- El asunto de Tacna y Arica (English: The question of Tacna and Arica). -- Lima : Torres Aguirre, 1905 (Other ed. 1917).
- Breve noticia de la fundación y transformaciones de la Facultad de Filosofía y Letras (English: Brief news of the foundation and transformation of the Faculty of Arts). -- Lima: E. Rosay, 1918 (Other ed. 1966).
- Curso de geografía general (English: General geography course). -- Lima: Libr. Francesa Científica E. Rosay, 1920.
- Geografía del Perú, para los colegios de segunda enseñanza y escuelas especiales (English: Geography of Peru, for secondary and special schools). -- Lima : Libr. Francesa and Casa Edit. H. Rosay, 1921.
- En ciudad ajena y en tierras propias (1903-1909) (English: In a foreign city and own land). -- Lima: Libr. and Sanmarti Press, 1923.
- Biografía en anécdotas del gran mariscal don Ramón Castilla y Marquezado (English: Biography in anecdotes of the great Marshal Ramón Castilla y Marquezado). -- [Lima] : F. y E. Rosay, [1924].
- Constitución y derecho usual para los colegios de segunda enseñanza (English: Constitution and common law for secondary schools). -- Casa Edit. E. Rosay, 1924.
- Fojas cortadas de un libro de historia patria (English: Folios cut from a book of national history). -- Lima: A.J. Rivas Berrio Press, [1924].

== Sources ==
- Anuario Bibliográfico Peruano de 1945. -- Lima, 1946.
- Enciclopedia ilustrada del Perú. Tauro, Alberto—Lima: PEISA, 2001. T. 8.
