= Windham-Ashland-Jewett Central School =

School in Windham, New York, United States

Location
- 5411 State Route 23; Windham, New York 12496; United States
- Coordinates: 42°18′22″N 74°15′19″W

Information
- Type: Public
- School district: Windham-Ashland-Jewett Central School District
- NCES District ID: 3631590
- Superintendent: John Wiktorko
- NCES School ID: 363159004225
- Principal: Anthony Taibi
- Teaching staff: 37.00 (on an FTE basis)
- Grades: PK-12
- Gender: Co-ed
- Enrollment: 282 (2024-2025)
- Student to teacher ratio: 7.62
- Campus: Rural: Distant
- Colors: Blue and White
- Mascot: Warriors
- Yearbook: Wajerian
- Website: www.wajcs.org

Windham-Ashland-Jewett Central School (WAJ) is the only school in the Windham-Ashland-Jewett school district in the town of Windham, in Greene County, New York, U.S.A. It is a K-12 school, which encompasses all grades from kindergarten through 12th grade.

As of 2012, of the district/school's 411 students, 23% were classified as "poor"; 93% were white, 5% Hispanic, 1% Asian; less than 1/2 of 1% were African-American.

For the 2016-17 school year, of the 292 students, 85.3% were white, 7.6% Hispanic, 2.4% Asian; 1.4% black, and 4.1% two or more races. 28.4% of the students were eligible for free lunch, with an additional 3.8% eligible for reduced-price lunch.

The WAJ boys downhill alpine ski team were the 2013 New York State champions.

== Athletics ==
The school district offers the following sports:

- Soccer
- Cross country
- Basketball
- Alpine skiing
- Mountain biking
- Snowboarding
- Baseball
- Softball
- Tennis
- Golf

== Alumni ==
- Scott Adams, creator of the Dilbert comic strip, and the author of several nonfiction works of satire, commentary, and business.
