= Loserthink =

Non fiction book by Scott Adams

Loserthink: How Untrained Brains Are Ruining America
- First edition
- Author: Scott Adams
- Language: English
- Subject: Self-help
- Genre: Non-fiction
- Publisher: Portfolio
- Publication date: November 5, 2019
- Publication place: United States
- Media type: Print, e-book
- Pages: 256 pages
- ISBN: 979-8990531642

Loserthink: How Untrained Brains Are Ruining America is a 2019 non-fiction book by Scott Adams, creator of the Dilbert comic strip. Adams suggests that many otherwise intelligent people are trapped by unproductive ways of thinking which he terms as loserthink. The reason for this, he says, is they do not have experience across multiple domains and thus are not equipped to think more productively.

Loserthink introduces readers to the most useful thought patterns in a variety of disciplines. Adams wants to help employees identify mental barriers and how to break through them, as well as escape from their own "mental prisons".

Adams suggested two ideas for a calmer Internet, namely the "48-hour rule", where everyone should be given a grace period of a couple of days to retract any controversial statement they have made, and the "20-year rule", where everyone should be automatically forgiven for any mistakes they made more than two decades ago, with the exception of certain serious crimes.
