= Jürgen Hartmann (political scientist) =

German political scientist

Jürgen Hartmann (born 1946) is a German political scientist. Since 2011, he has been a professor of political science, especially with respect to comparative politics, at the Helmut Schmidt University in Hamburg.

== Life and work ==
Hartmann published his dissertation in 1976, titled The American President in the related field of Congress fractions: Structures, strategies and implementation problems in the relations of Presidents Kennedy, Johnson and Nixon to majority groups in Congress (1961-1973). In 1982, he wrote "Political profiles of Western European industrial society" habilitation.

At the end of 2011, he was designated as Professor Emeritus.

== Areas of research and publications ==
His research specialty is analysis in the political science sector of society, especially comparative politics. In his academic career, he has written a number of textbooks on this overarching theme. His publications deal largely with international and governmental systems of various kinds, mainly in the western hemisphere.

His latest work was written together with Udo Kempf on Heads of State in a Democracy.

In addition, he worked intensively with the History of Political Science in European-American comparison study, his case is based on the US scale. However, the reduction in the history of the German political science in the period after 1945 by Wilhelm Bleek contained therein as "problematic "in

== Literature ==
- (Ed.), Manual German Länder 1990 passim
- Politik auf den Trummern der zweiten Welt: Russland, Osteuropa und die asiatische Peripherie, 1998 ISBN 3593359774
- Staatszeremoniell, 2000, ISBN 3452244857
- Internationale Beziehungen, 2001 ISBN 3825222225
- Geschichte der Politikwissenschaft: Grundzüge der Fachentwicklung in den USA und in Europa, 2003 TB 2006 ISBN 3810037176
- Das politische System der Europäischen Union. Eine Einführung, 2009 ISBN 3593390256
