= Max Bernhard Weinstein =

German physicist and philosopher (1852–1918)

Max Bernhard Weinstein (German: [ˈvaɪnʃtaɪn]; 1 September 1852 – 25 March 1918) was a German physicist and philosopher. He is best known as an opponent of Albert Einstein's theory of relativity, and for having written a broad examination of various theological theories, including extensive discussion of pandeism.

== Biography ==
Born into a Jewish family in Kaunas]], Vilna Governorate, Imperial Russia, Weinstein translated James Clerk Maxwell's Treatise on Electricity and Magnetism into German in 1883, and taught courses on electrodynamics at the University of Berlin, where he had earned his PhD in 1881.

While teaching at the Institute of Physics in the University of Berlin, Weinstein associated with Max Planck, Emil du Bois-Reymond, Hermann von Helmholtz, Ernst Pringsheim Sr., Wilhelm Wien, Carl A. Paalzow of the Technische Hochschule in Berlin Charlottenburg, August Kundt, Werner von Siemens, theologian Adolph von Siemens, historian Theodor Mommsen, and Germanic philologist Wilhelm Scherer.

He died in Berlin.

== Criticism of Einstein's theory of relativity ==
Weinstein was among the first physicists to reject and criticize Albert Einstein's theory of relativity, contending that "general relativity had removed gravity from its earlier isolated position and made it into a "world power" controlling all laws of nature," and warning that "physics and mathematics would have to be revised." It was Weinstein's writings, and their impact driving public sentiment against Einstein's theories, which led astronomer Wilhelm Foerster to convince Einstein to write a more accessible explanation of those ideas. But, one commentator contends that Weinstein's summaries of relativistic physics were "tedious exercises in algebra."

Weinstein argued against relativity in his book Die Physik der bewegten Materie und die Relativitätstheorie, published in 1913.

== Philosophical writings ==
In addition to his work in physics, Weinstein wrote several philosophical works. Welt- und Lebensanschauungen, Hervorgegangen aus Religion, Philosophie und Naturerkenntnis ("World and Life Views, Emerging From Religion, Philosophy and Perception of Nature") (1910) examined the origins and development of a great many philosophical areas, including the broadest and most far-reaching examination of the theological theory of pandeism written up to that point. A critique reviewing Weinstein's work in this field deemed the term pandeism to be an 'unsightly' combination of Greek and Latin, though Weinstein did not coin the term, nor did he claim to have. The reviewer further criticises Weinstein's broad assertions that such historical philosophers as Scotus Erigena, Anselm of Canterbury, Nicholas of Cusa, Giordano Bruno, Mendelssohn, and Lessing all were pandeists or leaned towards pandeism.

Philosophically, Weinstein was attracted to what he called a psychical or spiritual monism, which he believed to be comparable to the pantheism of Spinoza, and wherein the essence of all phenomena could be found entirely in the mind. Though he could see no way around the eventual heat death of the Universe, Weinstein suggested that there existed a fundamental 'psychical energy,' of which a maximum-entropy world would ultimately consist. Weinstein wrote:

That would correspond to the Indians' thoughts of Brahma and Buddha's nirvana. Would we call such an end in an absolutely spiritual being death? Certainly not death, but probably a dreamless sleep from which there is no awakening.

From this premise Weinstein reasoned that the world must have both a beginning and an end, and that a supernatural force must have initiated it, and so could bring about its end as well:

The world cannot emerge by itself from the entropic death. If the world, understood as matter, substance or energy, is finite, the entropic death must occur within a finite time. But then the world, and its processes in particular, must also have begun a finite time ago. This cannot have happened by itself, ... [and] a supernatural cause must consequently have been active. If one is forced to admit such a cause in the beginning, one can also let it govern the end, so that a beginning follows the end, and so on in all eternity.

Though he rejected theistic formulations regarding such things, Weinstein found the origin of the Universe to be so problematic that he wrote: "As far as I can see, only Spinozist pantheism, among all philosophies, can lead to a satisfactory solution."

== Works ==
- Handbuch der physikalischen Maassbestimmungen. Zweiter Band. Einheiten und Dimensionen, Messungen für Längen, Massen, Volumina und Dichtigkeiten, Julius Springer, Berlin 1888
- Die philosophischen Grundlagen der Wissenschaften. Vorlesungen gehalten an der Universität Berlin …, B. G. Teubner, Leipzig und Berlin 1906
- Welt- und Lebensanschauungen hervorgegangen aus Religion, Philosophie und Naturerkenntnis, Johann Ambrosius Barth, Leipzig 1910
- Die Physik der bewegten Materie und die Relativitätstheorie, Barth, Leipzig 1913
- Kräfte und Spannungen. Das Gravitations- und Strahlenfeld, Friedr. Vieweg & Sohn, Braunschweig 1914
