= Dos de Mayo, Misiones =

Dos de Mayo (Misiones)
- Municipality and village

- Location within Misiones Province Location within Argentina
- Country: Argentina
- Province: Misiones Province

Government
  - Intendant: José Luis Garay
- Time zone: UTC−3 (ART)

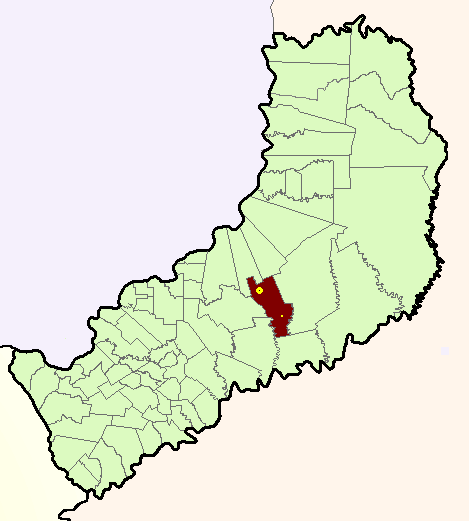
Municipio Dos de Mayo

Dos de Mayo (Misiones) is a village and municipality in Misiones Province in north-eastern Argentina.
