= USS LST-291 =

1943 LST-1-class tank landing ship

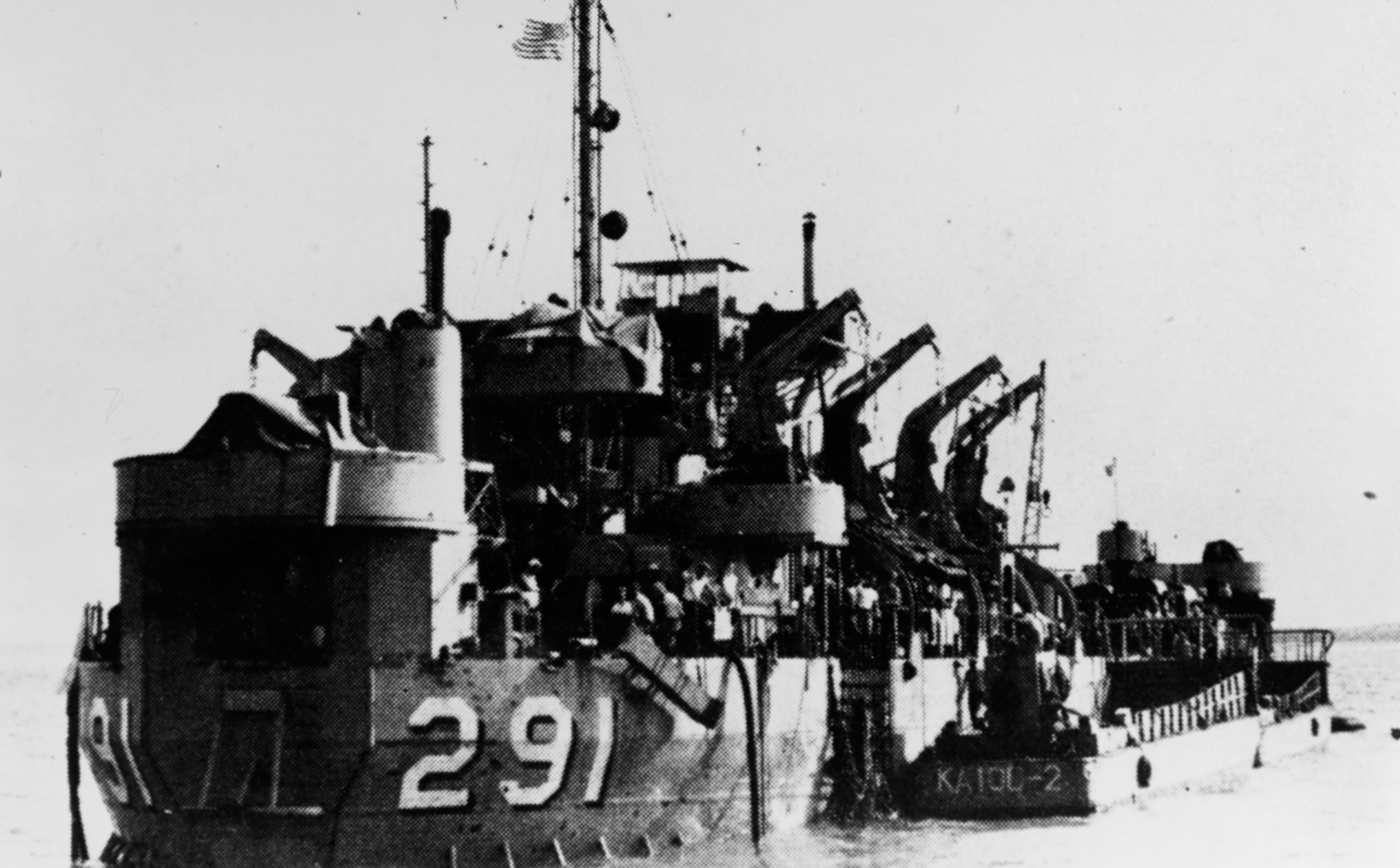
- USS LST-291 ran aground in 1954

History

United States
- Name: LST-291
- Builder: American Bridge Company, Ambridge
- Laid down: 25 September 1943
- Launched: 14 November 1943
- Stricken: 19 May 1954
- Honours and awards: 1 battle star (World War II)
- Fate: Sunk as target, July 1954

General characteristics
- Class & type: LST-1-class tank landing ship
- Displacement: 1,780 long tons (1,809 t) light; 3,880 long tons (3,942 t) full
- Length: 328 ft (100 m)
- Beam: 50 ft (15 m)
- Draft: Unloaded: Bow: 2 ft 4 in (0.71 m); Stern: 7 ft 6 in (2.29 m); Loaded : Bow: 8 ft 2 in (2.49 m); Stern: 14 ft 1 in (4.29 m)
- Propulsion: 2 General Motors 12-567 diesel engines, two shafts, twin rudders
- Speed: 12 knots (22 km/h; 14 mph)
- Boats & landing craft carried: Two to six LCVPs
- Troops: approx. 140 officers and enlisted
- Complement: 8–10 officers, 100–115 enlisted
- Armament: 5 × 40 mm gun mounts; 6 × 20 mm gun mounts; 2 × .50 cal (12.7 mm) machine guns; 4 × .30 cal (7.62 mm) machine guns

USS LST-291 was a LST-1-class tank landing ship built for the United States Navy during World War II by the American Bridge Company in Ambridge, Pennsylvania.

LST-291 was laid down on 25 September 1943 and launched 14 November 1943. During World War II, the LST-291 was assigned to the Europe-Africa-Middle East Theater, and participated in the Invasion of Normandy in June 1944.

In 1954, she ran aground on a coral reef off James Point, Eleuthera in the Bahamas. After 11 days of salvage operations which involved blasting a 1,000 foot channel through the reef, she was freed from the reef and towed back to the drydock at Jacksonville, Florida. The damage she sustained was too extensive, however, and LST-291 was decommissioned, struck from the Naval Register on 19 May 1954, and sunk as a target in July 1954.

LST-291 earned one battle star for World War II service.
