= Vanoff =

Vanoff is a surname. Notable people with the surname include:

- Felisa Vanoff (1925–2014), American dancer, choreographer, producer, and philanthropist, wife of Nick
- Nick Vanoff (1929–1991), American dancer, producer, and philanthropist
