= USS LST-283 =

LST-1-class landing ship tank

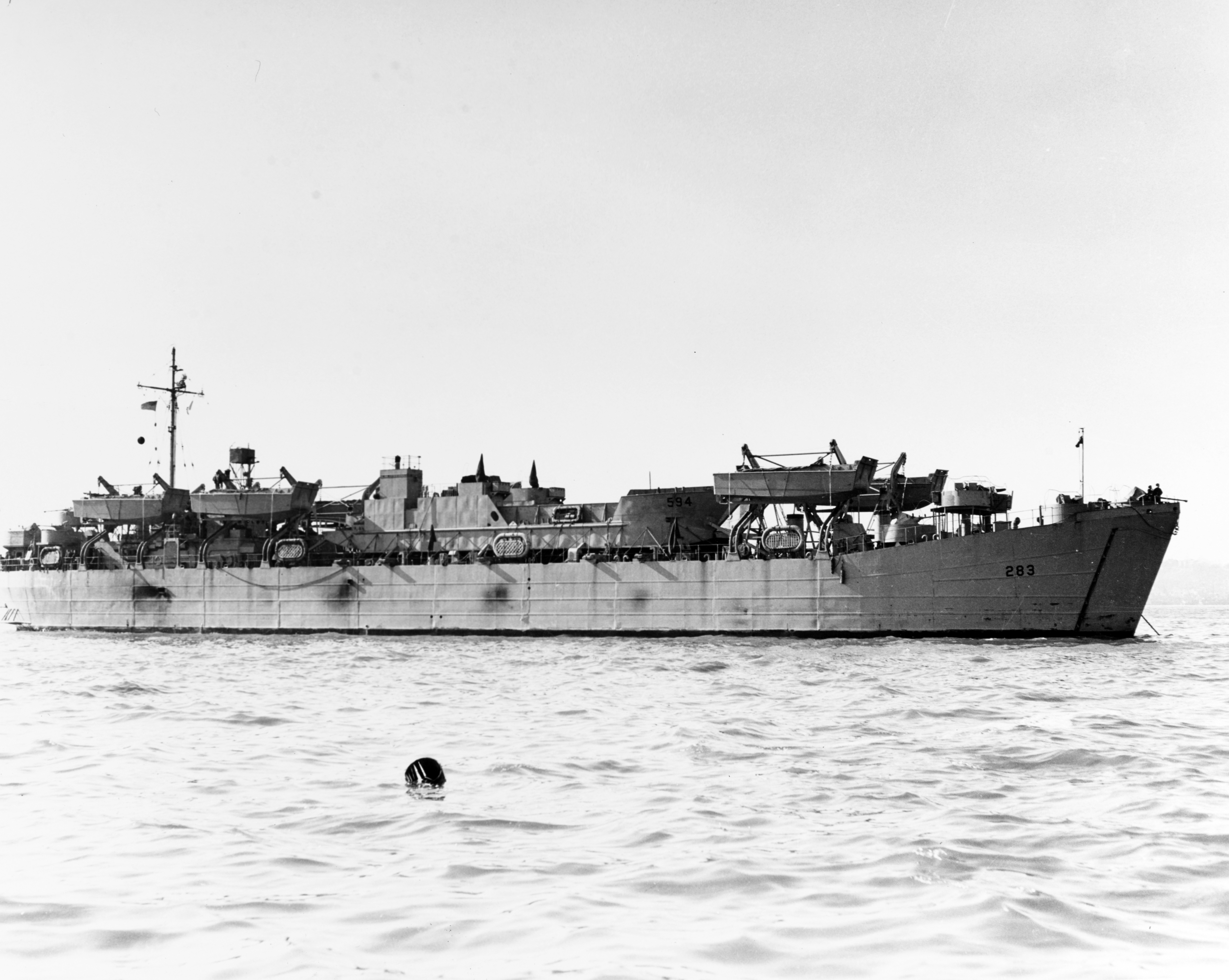
- USS LST-283 on 24 January 1944

History

United States
- Name: LST-283
- Builder: American Bridge Co., Ambridge
- Laid down: 2 August 1943
- Launched: 10 October 1943
- Sponsored by: Mrs C. W. McNamee
- Commissioned: 18 November 1943
- Decommissioned: 13 June 1946
- Stricken: 22 January 1947
- Identification: Callsign: NFLZ
- Fate: Sold to commercial service, 1947

History

Peru
- Name: Chimbote
- Namesake: Chimbote
- Acquired: 21 December 1951
- Commissioned: 21 December 1951
- Decommissioned: 1984
- Identification: Pennant number: LT-34
- Fate: Scuttled 1989/90

General characteristics
- Class & type: LST-1-class tank landing ship
- Displacement: 1,625 long tons (1,651 t) light; 4,080 long tons (4,145 t) full (sea-going draft with 1675 ton load)
- Length: 327 ft 9 in (99.90 m)
- Beam: 50 ft (15 m)
- Draft: Light: 2 ft 4 in (0.71 m) forward; 7 ft 6 in (2.29 m) aft; Sea-going: 8 ft 3 in (2.51 m) forward; 14 ft 1 in (4.29 m) aft; Landing (with 500 ton load): 3 ft 11 in (1.19 m) forward; 9 ft 10 in (3.00 m) aft
- Propulsion: 2 General Motors 12-567 900 hp (671 kW) diesel engines, two shafts, twin rudders
- Speed: 12 knots (22 km/h; 14 mph)
- Range: 24,000 nmi (44,000 km) at 9 kn (17 km/h; 10 mph)
- Boats & landing craft carried: 2 × LCVPs
- Complement: 7 officers, 104 enlisted
- Armament: 2 × twin 40 mm gun mounts; 4 × single 40 mm gun mounts; 12 × single 20 mm gun mounts

USS LST-283 was a LST-1-class tank landing ship in the United States Navy during World War II. She was later sold to the Peruvian Navy and renamed BAP Chimbote (LT-34).

== Construction and commissioning ==
LST-283 was laid down on 2 August 1943 at American Bridge Company, Ambridge, Pennsylvania. Launched on 10 October 1943 and commissioned on 18 November 1943.

=== Service in the United States Navy ===
During World War II, LST-283 was assigned to the Europe-Africa-Middle East theater. She took part in the Invasion of Normandy from 6 to 25 June 1944. She also took part in Operation Dragoon from 15 August to 13 September 1944. LST-283 was later assigned to the Asiatic-Pacific Theater, serving from 20 September to 20 November 1945. She was decommissioned on 13 June 1946 and struck from the Naval Register on 22 January 1947. On 25 March 1947, she was sold to Northrup H. Castle, Honolulu, Hawaii and renamed M/S Rawhiti.

=== Service in the Peruvian Navy ===
The Peruvian Navy purchased the ship on 21 December 1951 and renamed to BAP Chimbote (LT-34). She was later renumbered (DT-142).

She was decommissioned in 1984.

== Awards ==
LST-283 have earned the following awards:

- American Campaign Medal
- Europe-Africa-Middle East Campaign Medal (2 battle stars)
- Asiatic-Pacific Campaign Medal
- World War II Victory Medal
- Navy Occupation Service Medal (with Asia clasp)

== Sources ==
- United States. Dept. of the Treasury (1962). Treasury Decisions Under the Customs, Internal Revenue, Industrial Alcohol, Narcotic and Other Laws, Volume 97. U.S. Government Printing Office.
- Moore, Capt. John (1984). Jane's Fighting Ships 1984-85. Jane's Information Group. ISBN 978-0710607959.
- Saunders, Stephen (2009). Jane's Fighting Ships 2009-2010. Jane's Information Group. ISBN 978-0710628886.
- Fairplay International Shipping Journal Volume 222. United Kingdom: Fairplay Publishing Limited. 1967.
