= Pennsylvania House of Representatives, District 16 =

American legislative district

Pennsylvania's 16th State House of Representatives district
Representative
| Robert Matzie; D–Ambridge |
- Population (2022): 64,976

The 16th Pennsylvania House of Representatives District is in southwest Pennsylvania and has been represented by Democrat Robert Matzie since 2009.

== District profile ==
The 16th District is located in Beaver County and includes the following areas:

- Aliquippa
- Ambridge
- Baden
- Center Township
- Conway
- East Rochester
- Freedom
- Harmony Township
- Hopewell Township
- Monaca
- Rochester
- Rochester Township
- South Heights

== Representatives ==
| Representative | Party | Years | District home | Note |
Before 1969, seats were apportioned by county.
| Robert K. Hamilton | Democrat | 1969 – 1972 | | |
| Charles P. Laughlin | Democrat | 1973 – 1988 | | |
| Susan Laughlin | Democrat | 1989 – 2004 | Conway | |
| Sean M. Ramaley | Democrat | 2005 – 2008 | Economy | Vacated seat to run for Pennsylvania Senate. |
| Robert Matzie | Democrat | 2009 – present | Ambridge | Incumbent |

== Recent election results ==
PA House election, 2024: Pennsylvania House, District 16
| Party | Candidate | Votes | % |
|---|---|---|---|
| Democratic | Robert Matzie (incumbent) | 18,047 | 52.27 |
| Republican | Michael Perich | 16,477 | 47.73 |
| Total votes | | 34,524 | 100.00 |
| Democratic hold | | | |

PA House election, 2022: Pennsylvania House, District 16
| Party | Candidate | Votes | % |
|---|---|---|---|
| Democratic | Robert Matzie (incumbent) | 15,104 | 56.70 |
| Republican | Rico Elmore | 11,534 | 43.30 |
| Total votes | | 26,638 | 100.00 |
| Democratic hold | | | |

PA House election, 2020: Pennsylvania House, District 16
| Party | Candidate | Votes | % |
|---|---|---|---|
| Democratic | Robert Matzie (incumbent) | 19,101 | 56.19 |
| Republican | Rico Elmore | 14,891 | 43.81 |
| Total votes | | 33,992 | 100.00 |
| Democratic hold | | | |

PA House election, 2018: Pennsylvania House, District 16
| Party | Candidate | Votes | % |
|---|---|---|---|
| Democratic | Robert Matzie (incumbent) | Unopposed | |
| Total votes | | 18,529 | 100.00 |
| Democratic hold | | | |

PA House election, 2016: Pennsylvania House, District 16
| Party | Candidate | Votes | % |
|---|---|---|---|
| Democratic | Robert Matzie (incumbent) | Unopposed | |
| Total votes | | 24,078 | 100.00 |
| Democratic hold | | | |

PA House election, 2014: Pennsylvania House, District 16
| Party | Candidate | Votes | % |
|---|---|---|---|
| Democratic | Robert Matzie (incumbent) | Unopposed | |
| Total votes | | 13,013 | 100.00 |
| Democratic hold | | | |

PA House election, 2012: Pennsylvania House, District 16
| Party | Candidate | Votes | % |
|---|---|---|---|
| Democratic | Robert Matzie (incumbent) | 15,798 | 56.09 |
| Republican | Kathy Coder | 12,369 | 43.91 |
| Total votes | | 28,167 | 100.00 |
| Democratic hold | | | |

PA House election, 2010: Pennsylvania House, District 16
| Party | Candidate | Votes | % |
|---|---|---|---|
| Democratic | Robert Matzie (incumbent) | Unopposed | |
| Total votes | | 14,055 | 100.00 |
| Democratic hold | | | |
