= Paul Hertneky =

American journalist and author

Paul Hertneky is an American journalist and author best known for his 2016 book Rust Belt Boy: Stories of an American Childhood, about the Baby boomers he grew up with in the rust belt mill town of Ambridge, Pennsylvania, where he was once a steel worker.

He is a member of the faculty of Chatham University.

== Childhood and education ==
Hertneky was born in Pittsburgh and reared in Ambridge, Pennsylvania in a family of Czech/Slovak/Hungarian heritage. His father worked for the American Bridge Company, the company from which Ambridge takes its name.

Hertneky graduated from Ambridge Area High School in 1973, the University of Pittsburgh and Bennington College.

Hertneky and his wife, Robbie, settled in Hancock, New Hampshire, where they lived for almost 20 years.

== Career ==
Hertneky worked for a steel mill during college, then took a job at a trucking company, before moving to Massachusetts to become a journalist.

Hertneky has worked as a freelance writer and editor.

== Rust Belt Boy ==
Hertneky is the author of the 2016 Rust Belt Boy: Stories of an American Childhood.

The Pittsburgh Post-Gazette describes the essays that comprise Rust Belt Boy as a series of 26 vignettes, that, taken as a whole, "form an homage to a lost way of life" through "incantatory writing."

National Book Award finalist, Sy Montgomery calls it "An essential but overlooked portrait of America's blue collar heart" that "deserves to become a classic."

The Keene Sentinel called Rust Belt Boy "an unexpected journey of discovery, a journey of often bittersweet delights."
