= Ambridge–Aliquippa Bridge =

Bridge which crosses the Ohio River at Ambridge, Pennsylvania

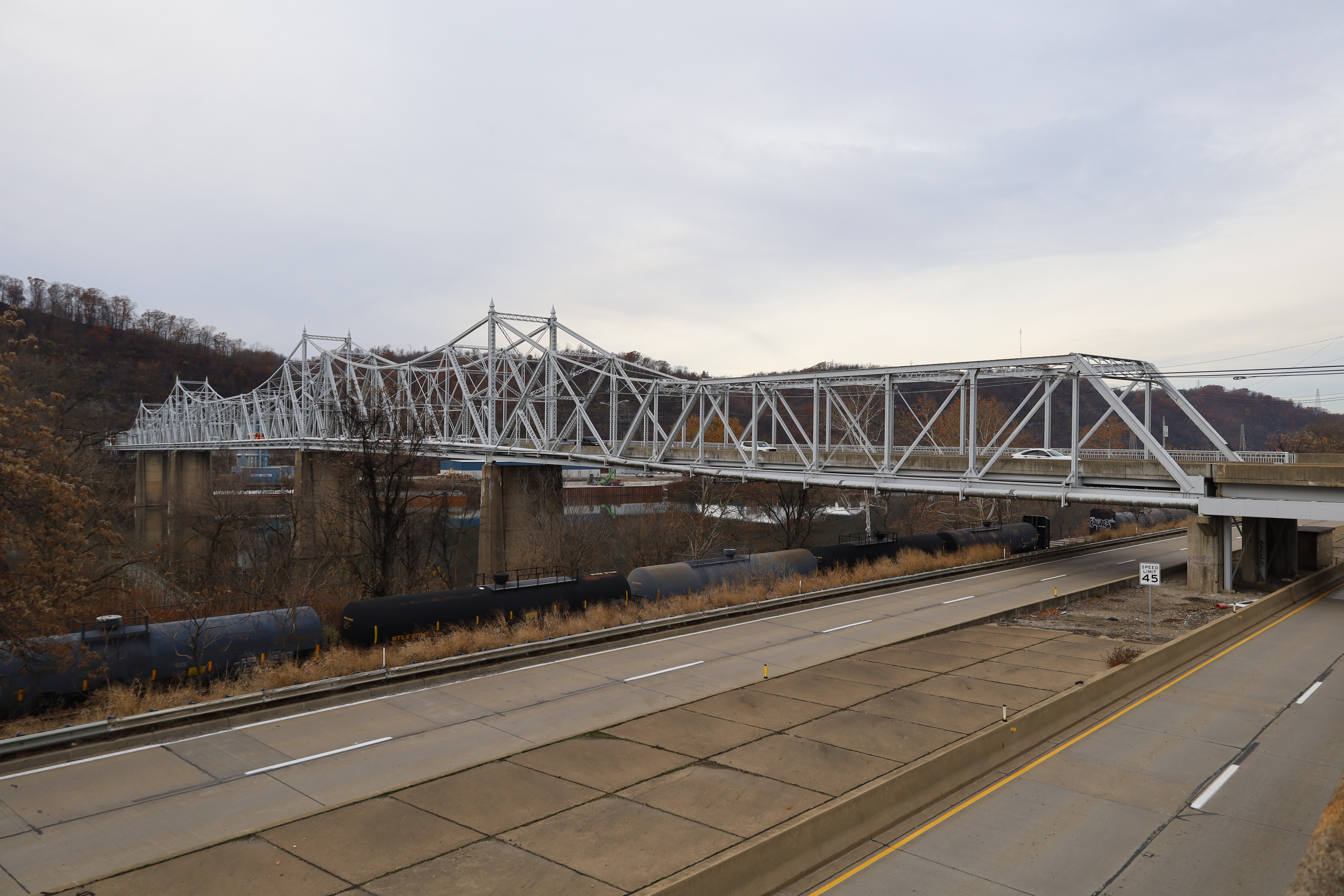
- The bridge in 2025
- Coordinates: 40°35′32″N 80°14′12″W
- Carries: 2 lanes of roadway
- Crosses: Ohio River
- Locale: Ambridge, Pennsylvania

Characteristics
- Design: Steel cantilever bridge
- Total length: 1,908 feet
- Width: 30 feet

History
- Opened: December 11, 1927

Location
- Interactive map of Ambridge–Aliquippa Bridge

The Ambridge–Aliquippa Bridge is a steel cantilever through truss bridge which crosses the Ohio River at Ambridge, Pennsylvania.

The Ambridge–Aliquippa Bridge’s cantilevered trusses are made from riveted steel, a design favored from the 1920s through the 1970s for crossings with 600 to 1,400 foot main spans. In addition to the Ohio River and two railways, the bridge crosses two main highways making the full length 1,908 feet excluding the end spans.

== History ==
=== Planning ===
Ambridge was incorporated in 1910 - named after the American Bridge Company which had significant operations along the Ohio River opposite the Jones & Laughlin Steel Company.

The need for a bridge was beyond doubt and long overdue as the towns of Ambridge and Woodlawn, which had populations in the hundreds at the turn of the 20th century, exceeded 40,000 by the late 1920s. In September 1924, the plans for a bridge over the Ohio River linking Ambridge and Woodlawn were revived from earlier ones shelved in 1917 by the outbreak of the First World War. A bond issue for $1.5 million was submitted to county voters and passed in November 1924. In January 1925 the county commissioners petitioned the court and the grand jury for authority to build the bridge and later that month made application to congress for authority to bridge the Ohio.

=== Construction ===
Dravo Contracting submitted the low bid of $144,000 to construct four piers completed on August 13, 1926 one month ahead of schedule. The steel was supplied by the Aliquippa Works for $609,000. The American Bridge Company charged $337,500. Pittsburgh and Lake Erie Railroad, which later became Conrail and CSX, paid $39,000 for the portion over its tracks. The total cost with approaches was $1.25 million - completed in record time and within estimates. It opened to the public on opened December 11, 1927.

While the American Bridge Company constructed dozens bridges throughout the US that year, the last one linking Ambridge and Woodlawn across the Ohio river was likely to have been the shortest distance hauled from factory to construction site. When the Ambridge-Woodlawn Bridge opened to the public that winter, the local paper reported the usual fanfare, commemorations, and even an “aerial bombardment”. The extreme convenience of building a bridge with one end adjacent to a steel plant and the other in the bridge company’s fabrication yard was duly noted. Local supporters claimed, “Only the paint had to be brought in”. Even the gravel and sand for the piers were excavated from the river by the local contractor, Dravo.

Thousands of bridges very similar were built across the US during that time, especially in the eastern US. Contemporaries constructed by the American Bridge Company include the Louisville Municipal Bridge in 1929 with an 820-foot main span, the Huey P. Long Bridge in New Orleans built in 1935 with a 790-foot main span, and the East Bay Bridge of the San Francisco Oakland Bay Bridge built in 1937 with a 1,400 foot main span. The first Carquinez Strait Bridge in Vallejo, CA, built in 1927, was a back-to-back 1,100 foot cantilevered truss.

=== Later history ===
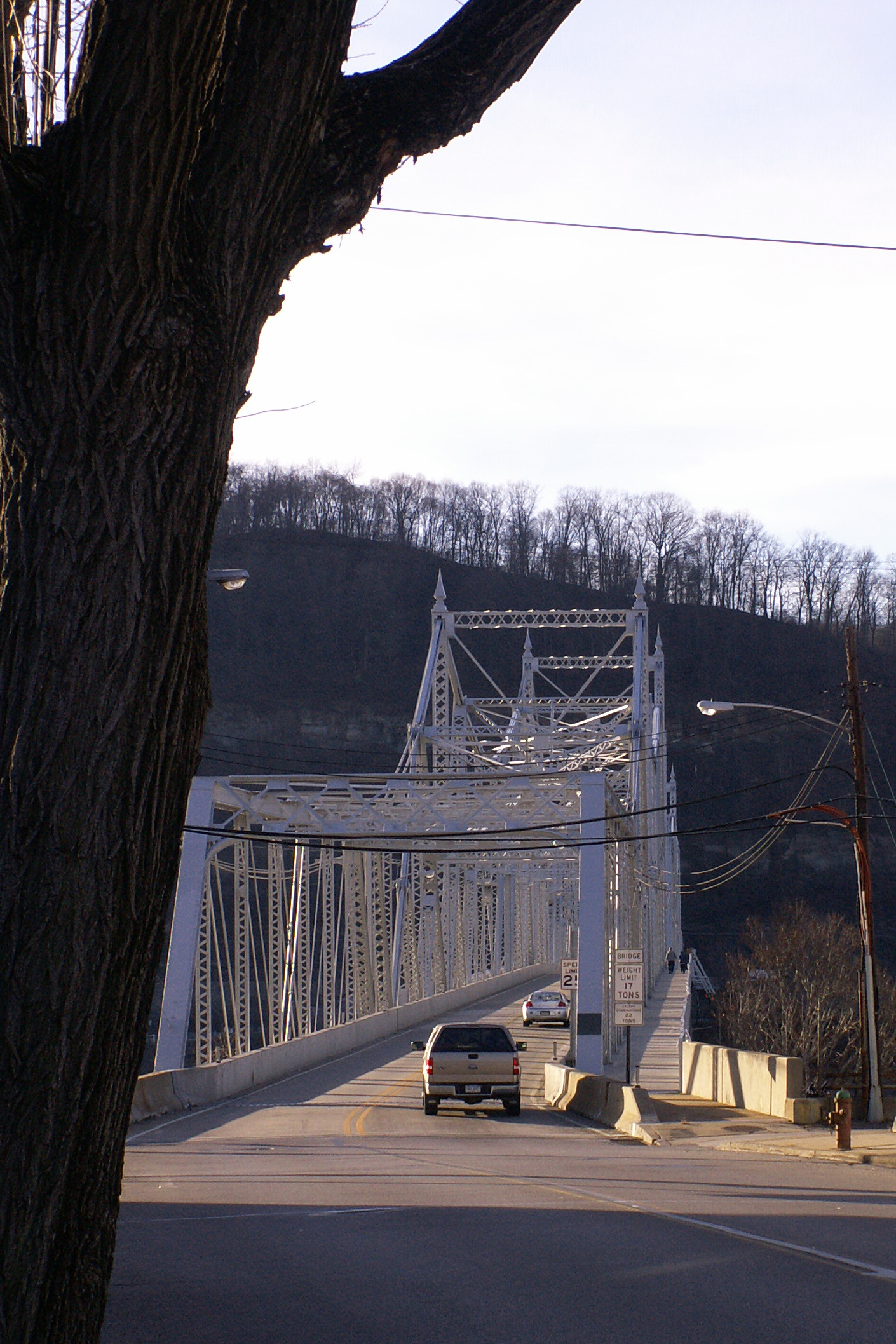
The bridge in 2014

The bridge was originally named the Ambridge-Woodlawn Bridge, but was soon renamed Ambridge-Aliquippa when Woodlawn was eclipsed by the rapid expansion of the Aliquippa Works of the Jones & Laughlin Steel Company.

The bridge was closed temporarily in November 2021 for repairs, causing extreme traffic problems for residents of the surrounding community. It reopened in December 2021 with no plans for closures in the foreseeable future.

== See also ==
- List of crossings of the Ohio River
