= Eugene Caputo =

American politician and lawyer

- Born: February 17, 1899; Italy
- Died: October 17, 1978 (aged 79); Ambridge, Pennsylvania
- Occupations: Lawyer, politician
- Spouse: Velma Lindway
- Children: Felisa Vanoff
- Relatives: Nick Vanoff (son-in-law)

Eugene A. Caputo (February 17, 1899 – October 17, 1978) was an American politician and lawyer.

== Early life ==
Eugene A. Caputo was born on February 17, 1899, in Italy. He received his bachelor's degree from University of Pittsburgh and his law degree from University of Pittsburgh Law School.

== Career ==
Caputo practiced Law in Ambridge, Pennsylvania. He served in the Pennsylvania House of Representatives from 1932 to 1938 as a Democrat. He served as a delegate to the Pennsylvania Constitutional Convention of 1967-1968.

== Personal life and death ==
Caputo married Velma Lindway, who worked as an illustrator. They had a daughter, Felisa Vanoff (1925-2014).

Caputo died in Ambridge, Pennsylvania.
