= Nita Ing =

- 殷琪
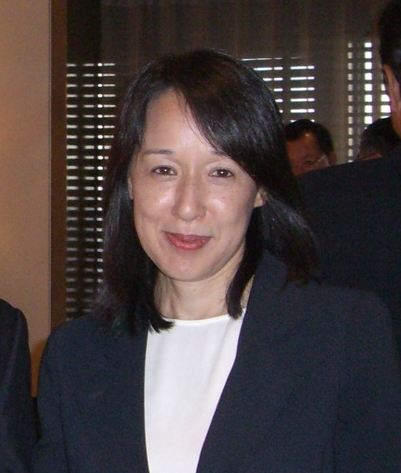
- Born: March 17, 1955 (age 71); Taipei, Taiwan
- Education: University of California, Los Angeles
- Occupations: Chairman, Continental Engineering Corporation; Chairman, Taiwan Synthetic Rubber Corporation; CEO, American Bridge Company; General Manager, Hill & Knowlton Investment Company; Director, Pacific Construction Company; Chairman, Voice of Taipei; National Policy Advisor, Office of the President of the Republic of China
- Parent(s): Chi-Hou Ing; Nancy Chang

Nita Ing (Chinese: 殷琪; born 17 March 1955) is a Taiwanese-American businesswoman who is the president of Continental Engineering Corporation and the former chairman of the board of the Taiwan High Speed Rail Corporation, the company which built a high-speed railway system from Taipei to Kaohsiung. A supporter of the Democratic Progressive Party, she had been an advisor to the former President Chen Shui-bian.

Her career as a construction magnate took place largely within Taiwan's Continental Engineering Corporation, of which she has served as the chairman of the board.

== Early life ==
Nita's hometown is Wenzhou and comes from a Wenzhounese family. Her father, Wenzhounese businessman, Chi-Hou Ing, was the founder of Continental Engineering Corporation and paternal grandfather was the former deputy minister of Ministry of Finance of Republic of China in the early 20th century.

Nita Ing was expelled from Taipei American School for "rowdy behavior" and sent to a Massachusetts boarding school in the 1970's when she was a teenager. She then majored in economics at University of California, Los Angeles (UCLA), but was expelled from the University for setting up a fire for protesting women inequality.

She was briefly married to Paul Gittleson in 1979 in Los Angeles, but divorced a few years later. Her children were from a subsequent relationship. She currently lives in Taipei, Taiwan with her two daughters, who both attend Taipei American School.

== Career ==
After graduating, Ing started a career at Continental Engineering Corporation in August 1977, eventually rising to become president of the firm. From 1998 until 2009, she was the chairperson of the Taiwan High Speed Rail Corporation. In 2010, she was appointed as the chairperson of Continental Holdings Corporation.
