= Dennis Wuycik =

American basketball player

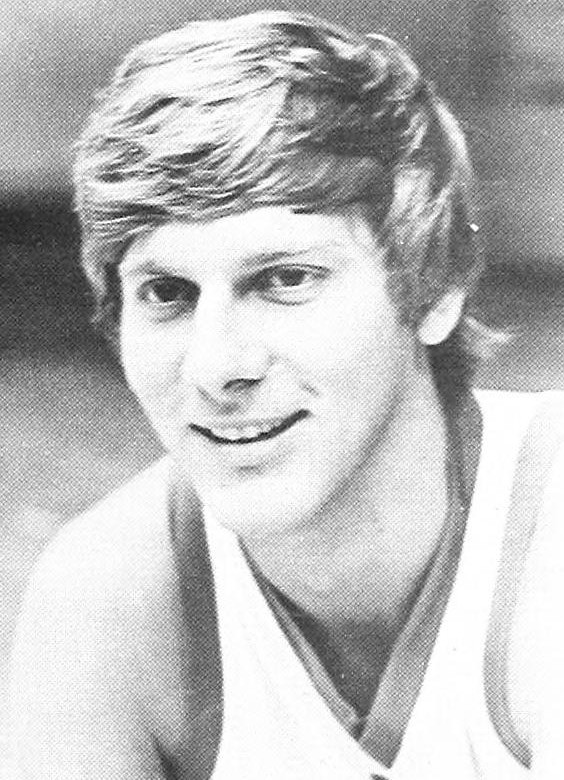

Personal information
- Born: March 29, 1950 (age 76) Ambridge, Pennsylvania, U.S.
- Listed height: 6 ft 6 in (1.98 m)
- Listed weight: 205 lb (93 kg)

Career information
- High school: Ambridge (Ambridge, Pennsylvania)
- College: North Carolina (1969–1972)
- NBA draft: 1972: 2nd round, 27th overall pick
- Drafted by: Boston Celtics
- Playing career: 1972–1975
- Position: Small forward
- Number: 44

Career history
- 1972–1975: Carolina Cougars / Spirits of St. Louis

Career highlights
- ABA All-Rookie Team (1973); Second-team All-American – NABC (1972); 2× First-team All-ACC (1971, 1972)
- Stats at Basketball Reference

Dennis Mark Wuycik (born March 29, 1950) is an American former basketball player. He was named to the 1973 ABA All-Rookie team, and averaged 4.4 points per game during his ABA career.

After Wuycik's basketball playing career ended, he started and published The Poop Sheet (later renamed ACC Sports Journal), a popular sports newsletter that initially covered North Carolina schools, but later extended to cover the entire Atlantic Coast Conference.
