= Susan Laughlin =

American politician (1932–2020)

Member of the Pennsylvania House of Representatives from the 16th district
- In office January 3, 1989 – November 30, 2004
- Preceded by: Charles P. Laughlin
- Succeeded by: Sean M. Ramaley

Personal details
- Born: March 16, 1932 Sewickley, Pennsylvania, US
- Died: June 27, 2020 (aged 88) Conway, Pennsylvania, US
- Party: Democratic
- Spouse: Widowed
- Children: 2

Susan Bogosian Laughlin (March 16, 1932 – June 27, 2020) was a Democratic member of the Pennsylvania House of Representatives.

== Formative years ==
Born in Sewickley, Pennsylvania on March 16, 1932, Susan Bogosian was a daughter of Misag and Lucie Bogosian. In 1950, she graduated from Ambridge Area High School.

She was married to former Pennsylvania House of Representatives member Charles P. Laughlin, a longtime consumer affairs advocate. He preceded her in death in 1988. They were the parents of one son and one daughter; her daughter, Sally Ann Laughlin, also preceded her in death.

== Political and public service career ==
A member of the Beaver County Democratic Women's Club, Laughlin was first elected to represent the 16th legislative district in the Pennsylvania House of Representatives in 1988, following the death of her husband, Rep. Charles Laughlin, who had died in office while representing the same district. Reelected to seven additional, consecutive terms, she did not run again after that, choosing instead to retire prior to the 2004 elections.

In 2004, she was elected as a delegate to the Democratic National Convention.

== Death and interment ==
Laughlin died at the age of eighty-eight in Conway, Pennsylvania on June 27, 2020. She was interred at the Beaver Cemetery and Mausoleum in Beaver, Pennsylvania.
