= Charles P. Laughlin =

American politician

Member of the Pennsylvania House of Representatives from the 16th district
- In office 1973–1988
- Preceded by: Robert K. Hamilton
- Succeeded by: Susan Laughlin

Personal details
- Born: November 19, 1931 Ambridge, Pennsylvania
- Died: April 10, 1988 (aged 56)
- Party: Democratic

Charles P. Laughlin was a Democratic member of the Pennsylvania House of Representatives. He was born in 1931.

He died of cancer in 1988.
