= Robert Matzie =

American politician (born 1968)

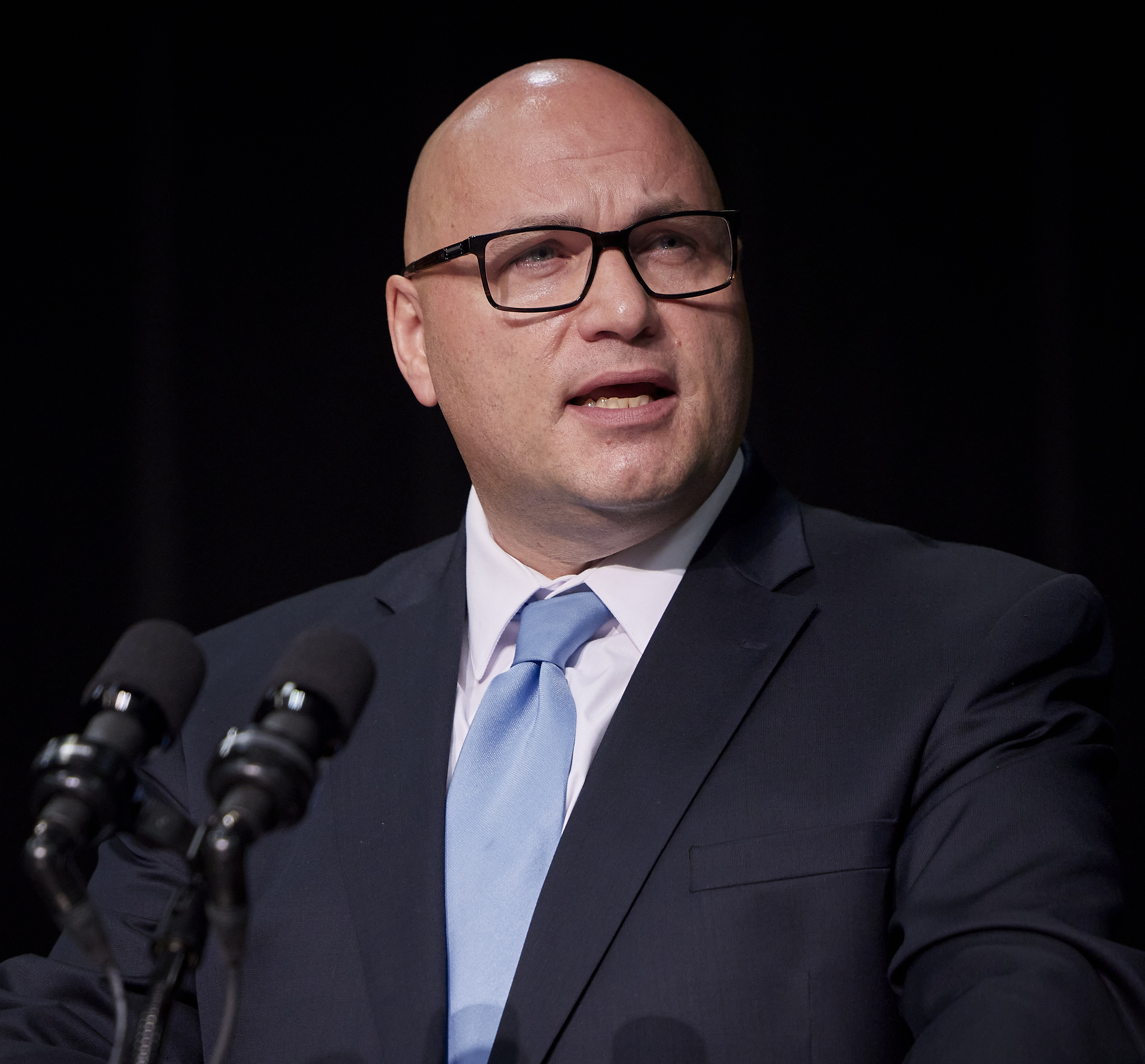
- Matzie in 2022

Member of the Pennsylvania House of Representatives from the 16th district
- Incumbent
- Assumed office January 6, 2009
- Preceded by: Sean M. Ramaley

Personal details
- Born: September 22, 1968 (age 58) Ambridge, Pennsylvania, U.S.
- Party: Democratic
- Children: Claire Matzie
- Education: Point Park University

Robert Matzie (born September 22, 1968) is a Democratic member of the Pennsylvania House of Representatives for District 16 and was elected in 2008.

== Committee assignments ==
- Committee On Ethics
- Consumer Affairs, Democratic Chair
