= Sean M. Ramaley =

American politician

Sean Michael Ramaley

Member of the Pennsylvania House of Representatives from the 16th district
- In office January 4, 2005 – November 30, 2008
- Preceded by: Susan Laughlin
- Succeeded by: Robert F. Matzie

Personal details
- Born: May 13, 1975 (age 51) Economy, Pennsylvania
- Party: Democratic
- Education: Allegheny College; University of Pittsburgh School of Law
- Occupation: Attorney

Sean Michael Ramaley (born May 13, 1975) was a Democratic member of the Pennsylvania House of Representatives for the 16th District from 2004 to 2008.

== Personal life ==
Sean Ramaley was born in Economy, Pennsylvania, and attended Quigley Catholic High School, where in sports and other activities, including baseball, basketball, soccer, bowling and scouting. His father was a mechanic for US Airways for 38 years.

Ramaley graduated from Allegheny College in 1997 and was awarded the college's "Ethical Leader of the Year Award." He moved to Ohio and served as a Research and Policy Aide for the Ohio Legislative Service Commission, focusing on state finance and budgetary matters. Ramaley returned to Pennsylvania as a professional political operative, managing political campaigns for U.S. Congress, the Pennsylvania House of Representatives, Allegheny County Council, Pennsylvania Courts of Common Pleas, and several municipal offices.

He attended the University of Pittsburgh School of Law, joining the University of Pittsburgh Law Review. After graduating in 2002, he took a position with the United States Department of Labor, where he clerked for the department's Administrative Law Judges. While at the Department of Labor, he joined the American Federation of Government Employees, Local 644. He also has maintained a private legal practice, working on corporate transactions, wills and estates.

He volunteered for the American Legion’s Boys State Program and co-founded the non-profit Keystone Leadership Development Corporation. He is on the Penn State Beaver Advisory Board and the Allegheny College Alumni Council.

== Political career ==
=== Career as State Representative ===
Ramaley won a 5-way race for the Democratic nomination for Pennsylvania's 16th legislative district, an open seat upon the retirement of Susan Laughlin. In July 2004, he took a job as a legislative staffer for the powerful Beaver County state representative, Mike Veon. He was elected to the Pennsylvania House of Representatives the November with a comfortable 20-point margin. He worked for Representative Veon until December of that year.

He was re-elected without opposition in 2006.

=== 2008 race for State Senate ===
Ramaley won the Democratic primary to succeed the retiring Gerald LaValle in the 47th senatorial district.

=== Indictment and acquittal ===
In July 2008, Ramaley was one of 12 individuals indicted by Pennsylvania Attorney General Tom Corbett as part of the 2006 Pennsylvania General Assembly bonus controversy. Ramaley was not indicted for accepting or authorizing bonuses, but on charges of taking a part-time "no-work" job in the Beaver Falls district office of state Representative Mike Veon, while running for office. After pressure from party leaders, Ramaley withdrew from the race, although he and his lawyer alleged that the charges were politically motivated.

At a jury trial, Ramaley presented evidence from former co-workers who testified that Ramaley did in fact perform work in the position. Ramaley was acquitted by a jury of all six charges against him on December 10, 2009.
