= Peter A. Angeles =

American philosopher and atheist writer

- Born: February 21, 1931; Ambridge, Pennsylvania
- Died: March 2, 2004 (aged 73)
- Occupation(s): Philosopher, writer

Peter Adam Angeles (February 21, 1931 – March 2, 2004) was an American philosopher and atheist writer.

Angeles was born in Ambridge, Pennsylvania. He obtained his BA, MS and PhD from Columbia University. He taught philosophy at the University of Western Ontario for 14 years. He taught philosophy at University of California, Santa Barbara (1968–1969) on a Canada Council Fellowship. He moved to Santa Barbara in 1970. He was Professor and Chairman of the Department of Philosophy at Santa Barbara City College (1970–1990).

In 1981, Angeles authored The Dictionary of Philosophy which was republished and revised as HarperCollins Dictionary of Philosophy in 1992. He was also the author of the Dictionary of Christian Theology (1985). Angeles was an atheist. He was the editor of Critiques of God (1976) and authored The Problem of God (1981).

Angeles died on March 2, 2004, from cancer.

== Selected publications ==
- The Possible Dream-Toward Understanding the Black Experience (1971)
- Critiques of God: Making the Case Against Belief in God (1976, 1997)
- Introduction to Sentential Logic (1976)
- The Dictionary of Philosophy (1981)
- The Problem of God: A Short Introduction (1981)
- Dictionary of Christian Theology (1985)
