= Dianne K. Prinz =

American scientist (1938–2002)

Dianne Kasnic Prinz
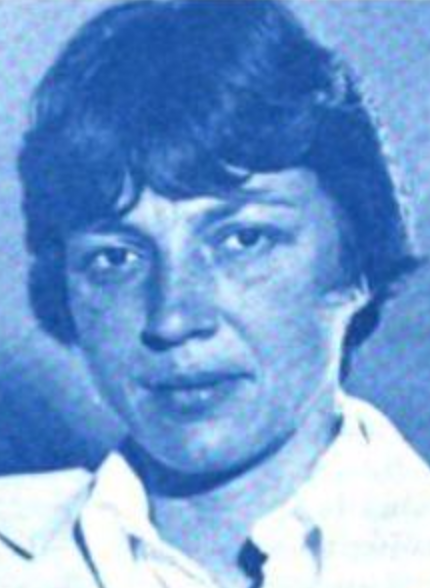
- Dianne K. Prinz, from a 1978 publication of the Federal Women's Program
- Born: Dianne Kasnic; September 29, 1938; Economy, Pennsylvania, U.S.
- Died: October 12, 2002 (aged 64); Arlington, Virginia, U.S.
- Occupations: Scientist, physicist, astronaut
- Awards: Navy Meritorious Civilian Service Award (2001)

Dianne Kasnic Prinz (September 29, 1938 – October 12, 2002) was an American scientist, a physicist with the United States Naval Research Laboratory. She trained as an astronaut, and was mission communicator for STS-51-F.

== Early life and education ==
Dianne Kasnic was born in Economy, Pennsylvania, the daughter of Joseph J. Kasnic and Anna Mae Kosyrich Kasnic. Her father was a farmer, steelworker and coal miner. "My father always appreciated scientific things, even though he only went to the seventh grade," she explained in 1978. "We had a small farm and there were lots of chemicals around so I got interested in chemistry." She graduated from Ambridge Area High School in 1956, and the University of Pittsburgh in 1960. She earned a PhD in physics at Johns Hopkins University in 1967. Her dissertation was titled "Strength-half-width Products of Self-broadened Lines in the 6.3 Micron Band of Water Vapor".

== Career ==
Prinz was a postdoctoral fellow at the University of Maryland from 1967 to 1971. In 1971, she joined the Naval Research Laboratory as a research physicist. Her title at retirement in 2000 was Head of the Solar Radiation Section, Solar Physics Branch, Space Science Division of the Naval Research Laboratory. Much of her work involved studies of solar irradiance. She was a volunteer for the Navy Community Outreach Program, speaking to students and community groups about the laboratory's work. She was a fellow of the Washington Academy of Science, and vice president of the National Capital Section of the Optical Society of America.

Prinz trained as an astronaut beginning in 1978, the first woman trained by NASA as a payload specialist. She was often mentioned as a possible "first American woman in space," but she never went into space. She was mission communicator for the Spacelab 2 mission in 1985, supporting the SUSIM-UARS.

Prinz shared in the Navy Award of Merit for Group Achievement in 1985, and the NASA Public Service Group Achievement Award in 1987. She received the Navy Meritorious Civilian Service Award in 2001.

== Publications ==
Prinz was author or co-author of dozens of scientific papers and technical reports, and published her research in journals including Science, Icarus, Optical Engineering, Journal of Applied Physics, Advances in Space Research, Astronomy & Astrophysics, Solar Physics, The Astrophysical Journal, Metrologia, Journal of Geophysical Research, and Geophysical Research Letters.

- "Observations of the O I 1304-A airglow from Ogo 4" (1971, with R. R. Meier)
- "Ogo-4 observations of the Lyman-Birge-Hopfield emission in the day airglow" (1971, with R. R. Meier)
- "High spatial resolution photographs of the sun in Lα radiation" (1973)
- "Lyman-α imagery of Comet Kohoutek" (1974, with C. B. Opalt, G. R. Carruthers, T. L. Page, and R. R. Meier)
- "Comet Kohoutek: Ultraviolet Images and Spectrograms" (1974, with C. B. Opalt, G. R. Carruthers, and R. R. Meier)
- "The Spatial Distribution of LYMAN-a on the Sun" (1974)
- "Space‐resolved spectra of laser‐produced plasmas in the XUV" (1976, with U. Feldman, G. A. Doschek, and D. J. Nagel)
- "A high precision Solar Ultraviolet Spectral Irradiance Monitor for the wavelength region 120–400 nm" (1981, with M. E. VanHoosier, J-D. F. Bartoe, Guenter Brueckner, and J. W. Cook)
- "Optical design of a near-ultraviolet coronagraph for a sounding rocket platform" (1994, with Clarence M. Korendyke and Dennis George Socker)
- "Solar ultraviolet spectral-irradiance observations from the SUSIM-UARS experiment" (1995, with G. E. Brueckner, L. E. Floyd, P. A. Lund, and M. E. VanHoosier)
- "Solar UV irradiance variation during cycles 22 and 23" (2002, with L. E. Floyd, P. C. Crane, and L. C. Herring)

== Personal life ==
Dianne Kasnic married fellow scientist Gary Prinz; they later divorced. Dianne K. Prinz died from cancer in 2002, aged 64 years, in Arlington, Virginia.
