= Don Granitz =

American football player (1928–2016)

Biographical details
- Born: August 24, 1928; Ambridge, Pennsylvania, U.S.
- Died: January 28, 2016 (aged 87); Mishawaka, Indiana, U.S.

Playing career

Football
- 1948–1951: Taylor

Coaching career (HC unless noted)

Football
- 1952–1954: Taylor

Baseball
- 1953–1955: Taylor

Administrative career (AD unless noted)
- 1971: Bethel (IN)

Head coaching record
- Overall: 10–15 (football)

Donald L. Granitz (August 24, 1928 – January 28, 2016) was a Christian missionary and an American football player and coach. He served as the head football coach at Taylor University in Upland, Indiana from 1952 to 1954. After serving as a missionary in Brazil, Granitz returned to the United States to become the athletic director at Bethel College in Mishawaka, Indiana in 1971.

== Head coaching record ==
=== Football ===
Year	Team	Overall	Conference	Standing	Bowl/playoffs
Taylor Trojans (Hoosier Conference) (1952–1954)
1952	Taylor	0–9	0–6	7th	
1953	Taylor	4–4	3–3	T–4th	
1954	Taylor	6–2	4–2	T–2nd	
Taylor:		10–15	7–11		
Total:		10–15			
