= Ed Latimore =

Retired American professional boxer and author (born 1985)

Personal information
- Other names: Black Magic
- Born: February 15, 1985 (age 41) Pittsburgh, Pennsylvania, U.S.
- Height: 6 ft (1.8 m)
- Weight: Heavyweight

Boxing career
- Reach: 76 in (193 cm)
- Stance: Orthodox

Boxing record
- Total fights: 15
- Wins: 13
- Win by KO: 7
- Losses: 1
- Draws: 1

Ed Latimore
- Education: Duquesne University, B.A. Physics
- Occupations: Author, marketer, entrepreneur
- Writing career
- Genre: non-fiction
- Notable works: Not Caring What Other People Think Is A Superpower: Insights From A Heavyweight Boxer (2017); Sober Letters To My Drunken Self (2018); Engagement Is The New Cocaine: The Art and Science Of Writing Awesomely Addictive Tweets (2018)

Edward Ashley Latimore Jr. (born February 15, 1985, in Pittsburgh, Pennsylvania) is a retired American professional boxer (13–1–1), influencer, and author. His final professional fight was December 17, 2016.

He launched his blog Mind and Fist in 2013, focusing on the difficult lessons he learned from growing up in public housing projects, overcoming alcohol and pornography addiction, and general self-improvement.

He has published two books, Not Caring What Other People Think Is a Superpower: Insights from a Heavyweight Boxer and Sober Letters to My Drunken Self, along with a writing and marketing guide for social media titled Engagement Is the New Cocaine: The Art and Science of Writing Awesomely Addictive Tweets.

He has been a guest on The James Altucher Show, The Jordan Harbinger Show, The Art of Manliness, Farnam Street, and Coffee with Scott Adams to discuss sobriety, boxing, growing up in poverty, and physics.

He has also been featured on Ryan Holiday's blog The Daily Stoic as well as in James Clear's international best seller, Atomic Habits.

== Early life ==
Latimore was born on February 15, 1985, in Pittsburgh, PA. He only saw his father a few times a year and was raised primarily by his mother. The family was poor and lived in the Hill District housing projects until they were demolished in 1995. The family then moved across town to the Northview Heights housing project where he lived until he was 18 years old.

== Amateur boxing career ==
Latimore started amateur boxing in 2007 when he was 22 years old. He won the Pennsylvania State National Golden Gloves in 2011 at the 201+ lb weight class. He also became a national amateur boxing champion by winning the National Police Athletic League boxing tournament in Toledo, Ohio at the 201+ lb weight class. He holds notable amateur victories over former IBF heavyweight champion Charles Martin and 2012 United States Olympian and two-time title challenger Dominic Breazeale.

Latimore was also a member of now deceased media mogul Michael King's All-American Heavyweights boxer development program, where he lived and trained alongside Martin and Breazeale in Carson, California.

== Professional boxing career ==
Latimore started his professional boxing career on January 26, 2013, with a 3rd-round TKO victory over 4–1 southpaw Jon Hill.

After 6 professional fights, Latimore was signed by the Jay-Z owned sports promotion company Roc Nation Sports.

Latimore's first televised fight was against Trey Lippe-Morrison, the son of late WBO Heavyweight Champion Tommy Morrison. He suffered his first career loss by a devastating first-round TKO.

Latimore fought one more time in 2016 to a draw against Willis Lockett. He spent his entire professional boxing career with trainer Tom Yankello.

In 2025 Latimore announced he would be making a return to boxing with the help of Rebel Health Alliance.

== Professional boxing record ==
15 fights	13 wins	1 loss
By knockout	7	1
By decision	5	0
By disqualification	1	0
Draws	1	

No.	Result	Record	Opponent	Type	Round, time	Date	Location
15	Draw	13–1–1	(United States) Willis Lockett	SD	6	December 17, 2016	(United States) Mountaineer Casino Ballroom, New Cumberland, West Virginia, U.S.
14	Loss	13–1	(United States) Trey Lippe-Morrison	KO	1 (6), 2:19	September 23, 2016	(United States) Buffalo Run Casino, Miami, Oklahoma, US
13	Win	13–0	(United States) Juan Goode	SD	6	July 15, 2016	(United States) Rivers Casino, Pittsburgh, Pennsylvania, U.S.
12	Win	12–0	(United States) Hassan Lee	TKO	6	April 23, 2016	(United States) Mountaineer Casino Ballroom, New Cumberland, West Virginia, U.S.
11	Win	11–0	(United States) Willis Lockett	SD	6	January 8, 2016	(United States) Royal Oak Music Theatre, Royal Oak, Michigan, U.S.
10	Win	10–0	(United States) Terrell Jamal Woods	UD	6	December 11, 2015	(United States) Wellsburg Banquet Hall, Wellsburg, West Virginia, U.S.
9	Win	9–0	(United States) John Turlington	KO	1(6) 01:51	September 6, 2015	(United States) Serbian American Cultural Center, Weirton, West Virginia, U.S.
8	Win	8–0	(United States) Robert Hawkins	UD	6	May 22, 2015	(United States) Wheeling Island Casino Racetrack, Wheeling, West Virginia, U.S.
7	Win	7–0	(United States) Brandon Spencer	UD	6	February 7, 2015	(United States) Serbian American Cultural Center, Weirton, West Virginia, U.S.
6	Win	6–0	(United States) Excell Holmes	KO	1 (4), 3:00	October 3, 2014	(United States) Mohegan Sun Casino, Uncasville, Connecticut, U.S.
5	Win	5–0	(United States) Travis Fulton	DQ	2 (4), 2:46	May 17, 2014	(United States) Mountaineer Casino Racetrack and Resort, Chester, West Virginia, U.S.
4	Win	4–0	(United States) Rubin Williams	KO	1 (4), 1:05	March 28, 2014	(United States) Serbian American Cultural Center, Weirton, West Virginia, U.S.
3	Win	3–0	(United States) Christopher White	KO	2 (4), 3:00	April 20, 2013	(United States) Serbian American Cultural Center, Weirton, West Virginia, U.S.
2	Win	2–0	(United States) Donnie Crawford	TKO	2 (4), 1:22	April 6, 2013	(United States) Mountaineer Casino Racetrack and Resort, Chester, West Virginia, U.S.
1	Win	1–0	(United States) Jon Hill	TKO	1 (4), 1:01	January 26, 2013	(United States) Serbian American Cultural Center, Weirton, West Virginia, U.S.

== Writing career ==
On February 17, 2017, Latimore released Not Caring What Anyone Thinks Is A Superpower: Insight From A Heavyweight Boxer. The book explores areas of his life that, while making major improvements, Latimore put time in to “develop the ability to shrug off your critics and not let them drag you back down to their level.”

On December 23, 2018, Latimore released Sober Letters To My Drunken Self. The book is written to help people having difficulty with the emotional struggles involved with getting control of their drinking. The book was released on the 5 year anniversary of Latimore's sobriety.

On December 25, 2018, Latimore released Engagement Is The New Cocaine: The Art And Science Of Writing Awesomely Addictive Tweets. The book teaches the benefits of using stylistic devices to bolster social media engagement. The guide has been generally well reviewed.

== Personal life ==
Latimore is a strong advocate for sobriety and overcoming pornography addiction. He's been sober since December 23, 2013. He holds a Bachelor of the Arts degree in physics from Duquesne University, which he did not attain until age 33. He's a veteran of The United States Army National Guard. He also is an avid online and over-the-board chess player, having been featured in American Chess Magazine. Latimore is in a long-term relationship. He proposed to his long-term girlfriend in 2020.

On God and religion, Latimore said: "For all intents and purposes, I carry the beliefs of a Christian or Catholic. Not only that, but I find that – all things considered equal – I tend to enjoy the company of people who have some religious beliefs rather than not."
