= Leo Nobile =

American football player (1922–2006)

No. 58
- Positions: Guard; Linebacker

Personal information
- Born: September 22, 1922; Ambridge, Pennsylvania
- Died: November 14, 2006 (aged 84); Moon Township, Pennsylvania
- Listed height: 5 ft 10 in (1.78 m)
- Listed weight: 215 lb (98 kg)

Career information
- College: Penn State

Career history
- 1947: Washington Redskins
- 1948–1949: Pittsburgh Steelers
- Stats at Pro Football Reference

Leo Anthony Nobile (September 22, 1922 – November 14, 2006) was an American football player for the Washington Redskins and Pittsburgh Steelers of the National Football League.

== Biography ==
Born in Ambridge, Pennsylvania, Nobile played college football as a guard at Pennsylvania State University. Before he graduated, he served in the United States Army during World War II as a radio operator in the Aleutian Islands. After the war, he graduated from Penn State and joined the Redskins for the 1947 season. He played both guard and linebacker for the Steelers in 1948 and 1949. Nobile gained dubious notoriety for almost drowning during a rainy-day game at Forbes Field when he was trapped under a pile of players face-down in a puddle.

From 1973 to 1989, Nobile was director of activities and athletics at Western Penitenitary near Pittsburgh, where he started a semi-pro inmate team called the "Pittsburgh Stealers."

Nobile lived in Moon Township, Pennsylvania. He died of kidney failure on November 14, 2006.
