= Robert K. Hamilton =

American politician

76th Speaker of the Pennsylvania House of Representatives

Member of the Pennsylvania House of Representatives
- In office January 5, 1965 – November 10, 1986
- Preceded by: Stuart Helm
- Succeeded by: Kenneth Lee

Member of the Pennsylvania House of Representatives

Member of the Pennsylvania House of Representatives from the 16th district
- In office January 7, 1969 – November 30, 1972
- Preceded by: District created
- Succeeded by: Charles Laughlin

Member of the Pennsylvania House of Representatives from the Beaver County district
- In office January 4, 1949 – November 30, 1968
- In office January 7, 1941 – November 30, 1946

Personal details
- Born: September 3, 1905 Roswell, New Mexico
- Died: November 10, 1986 (aged 81) Ambridge, Pennsylvania
- Party: Democratic

Robert K. Hamilton (September 3, 1905 – November 10, 1986) was a Speaker of the Pennsylvania House of Representatives.

Hamilton was first elected to the Pennsylvania House of Representatives in 1941 and served through 1946. He served another nonconsecutive tenure from 1949 until 1972 .

Hamilton was Ambridge, Beaver County, Pennsylvania.
