= Chemex Coffeemaker =

Pour-over style glass coffeemaker

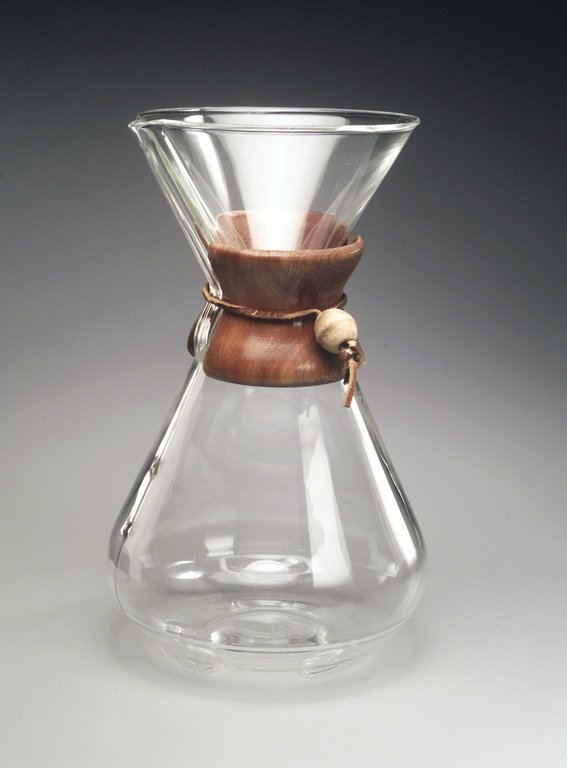
Chemex Coffeemaker; designer: Peter Schlumbohm, 1941; Brooklyn Museum.

The Chemex Coffeemaker is a manual pour-over style glass coffeemaker, invented by Peter Schlumbohm in 1941, manufactured by the Chemex Corporation in Chicopee, Massachusetts.

In 1958, designers at the Illinois Institute of Technology selected the Chemex Coffeemaker as "one of the best-designed products of modern times." It is included in the collection of the Museum of Modern Art in New York City. It has been featured in the novel From Russia with Love, in a scene where James Bond eats breakfast, the film Harper starring Paul Newman, The Mary Tyler Moore Show, and Ira Levin's Rosemary's Baby, as well as its film adaptation.

== Design ==
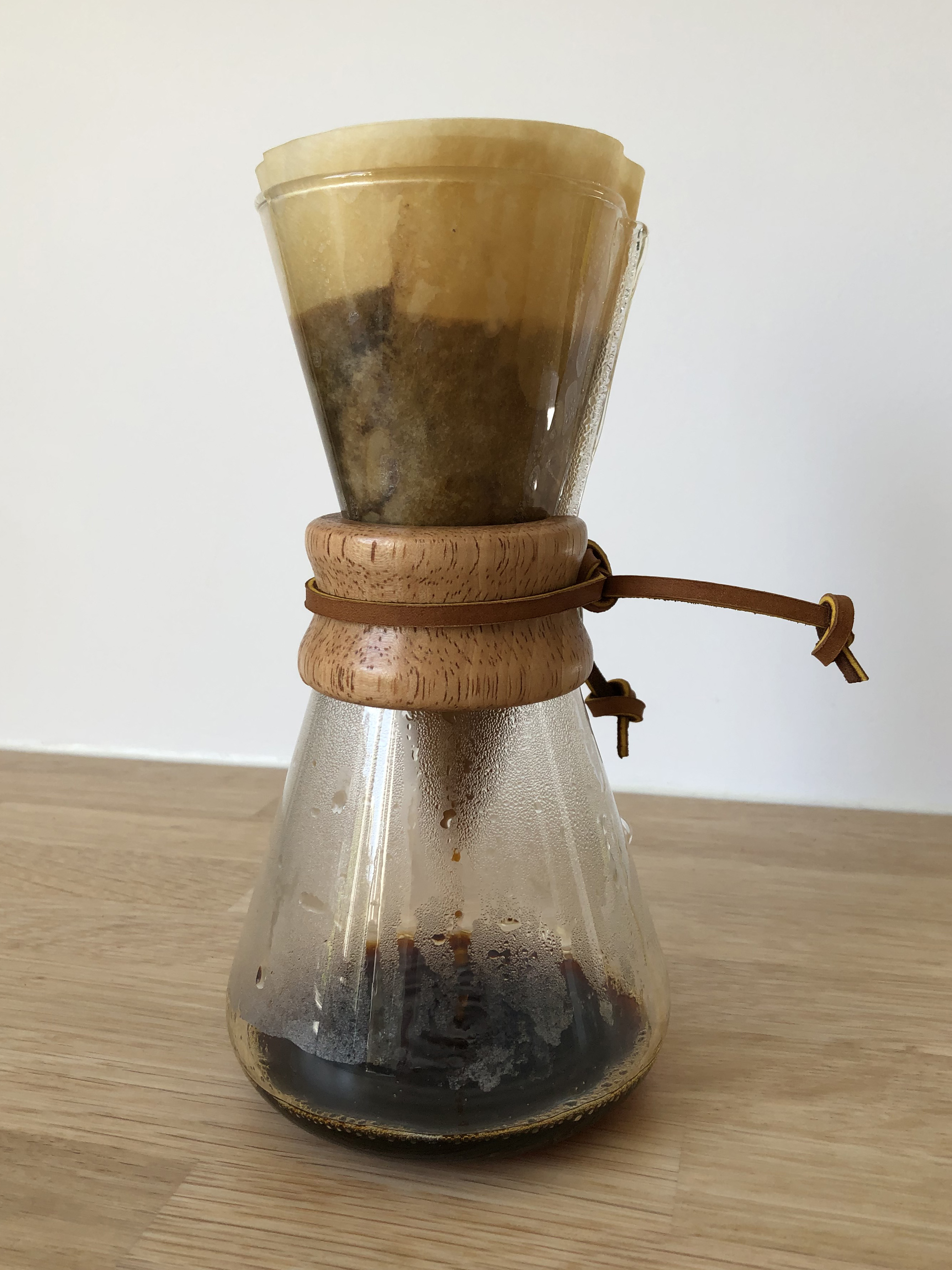
A Chemex coffeemaker brewing coffee using the typical 'half moon' filters.

The Chemex coffeemaker consists of an hourglass-shaped glass flask with a conical funnel-like neck and proprietary filters, made of bonded paper, that are thicker than the standard paper filters used for a drip coffeemaker. The thicker paper of the Chemex filters removes most of the coffee oils and makes coffee that is much "cleaner" than coffee brewed in other coffee-making systems. The thicker filter papers may also assist in removing more cafestol, a cholesterol-elevating compound found in coffee.

The most visually distinctive feature of the Chemex is the heatproof wooden collar around the neck, which allows it to be easily handled and poured when full of hot coffee. The collar is turned and then split in two to allow it to fit around the glass neck. The two pieces are held loosely in place by a tied leather thong. For a design piece that became popular post-war at a time of Modernism and precision manufacture, this juxtaposition of natural wood and the organic nature of a hand-tied knot with the laboratory nature of glassware was a distinctive feature of its appearance.

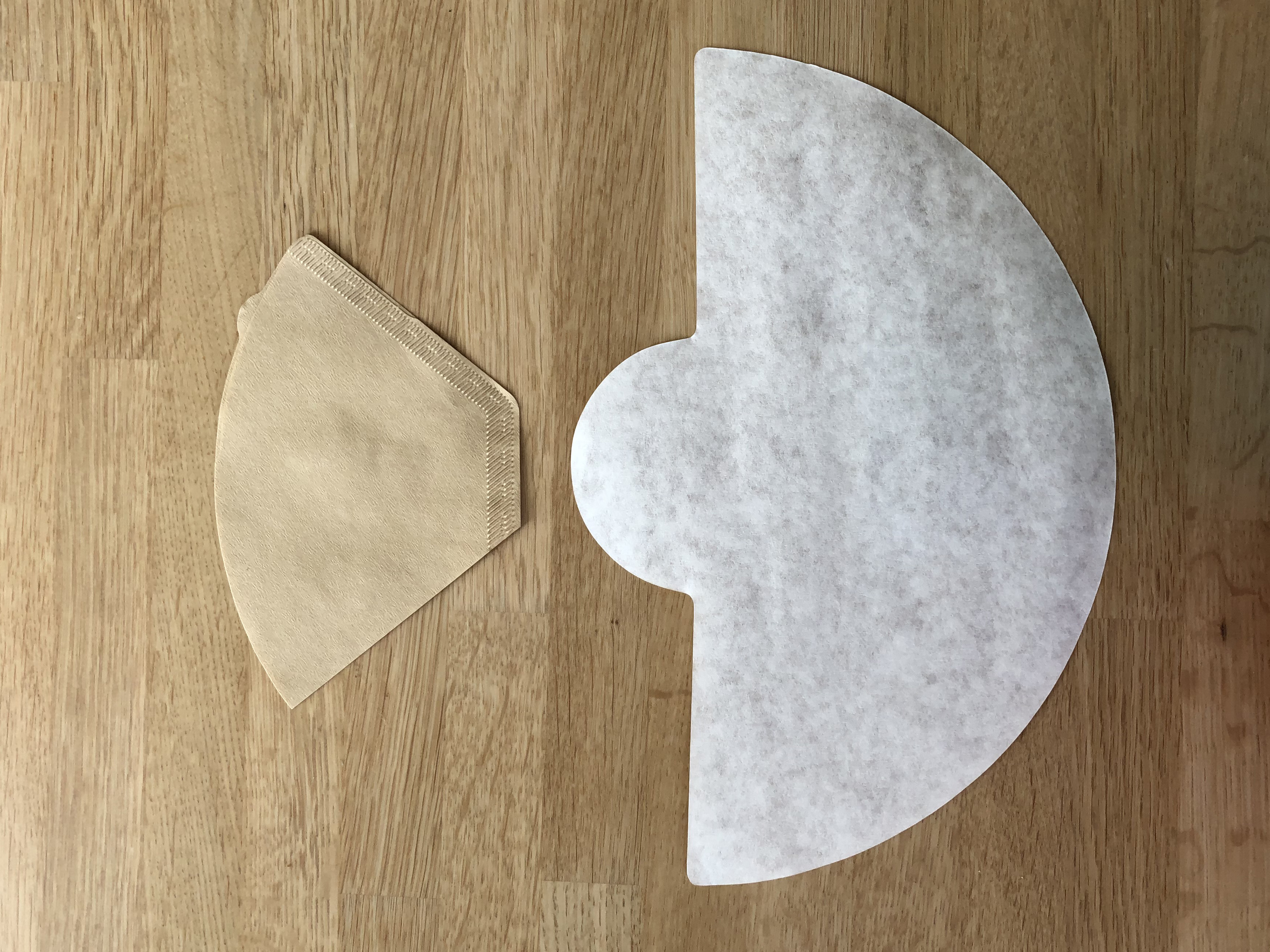
A Chemex coffeemaker "unfolded half moon" filter FP-2 (right) together with a regular #4 coffee filter (left)

== Brewing coffee ==
Coffee is brewed by first folding the paper filter into shape, placing the folded side with a printed number 3, where the pour spout is located and placing it into the neck of the flask. The Chemex filter should be rinsed with hot water to remove any paper taste. After dumping the water, ground coffee is added to the rinsed paper filter. A coarse grind resembling kosher salt is typically recommended for the brewing process. Hot water at 93–96 °C (199–205 °F) is then poured through the coffee and filter, depositing brewed coffee into the flask. There is a spout located on the top half of the brewer. This allows for easily pouring out coffee post brew and ensures airflow while brewing, avoiding vacuum sealing.

== See also ==
- Erlenmeyer flask
- Chemex filter system (FP-1, FP-2, FP-2N, FS-100, FSU-100, FC-100)
- Bodum Pour Over (a similar looking metal filter holder)
- Hario Drip Pot Woodneck (a similar looking cloth filter holder)
