= Thomas Yankello =

American boxing trainer (born 1971)

Thomas Yankello Jr. (born February 12, 1971) is an American Hall of Fame boxing trainer and a teacher of boxing through his YouTube channel, World Class Boxing Channel. Yankello is considered by many as one of the best boxing trainers in the world. He was the boxing coach of six-time, four weight class, world champion Roy Jones Jr., IBF lightweight world champion Paul Spadafora, Olympic Gold Medalist Daniyar Yeleussinov, 2 time Bronze Olympian Heavyweight Ivan Dychko, Former Olympian Calvin Brock, Light Heavyweight Atif Oberlton, IBA super featherweight world champion Monty Meza-Clay, and USBA WBA-NABA and IBC lightweight world champion Verquan Kimbrough. In 2014, Tom Yankello was inducted into the Beaver County Sports Hall of Fame, followed by inductions into the Pennsylvania Boxing Hall of Fame in 2022, the Pennsylvania Sports Hall of Fame in 2025, and the National Italian American Hall of Fame also in 2025.

Yankello served as the coach of IBF Heavyweight Title challenger Calvin Brock and WBO Cruiserweight Title challenger Brian Minto. He coached Roy Jones Jr in title defenses and most recently his bout against Iron Mike Tyson. Tom is currently the coach of the 2016 Olympic Gold Medalist Daniyar Yeleussinov, the 2012 and 2016 Heavyweight Olympian Bronze Medalist Ivan Dychko, 2018 165 lb National Golden Gloves champion Kiante Irving, 2022 and 2024 Golden Glove Champion Danny Bodish, Professional boxers Paul Palombo, Tre Craycraft, Ramil Islamov, Xavier Campbell among numerous state and national amateur champions. He was also the boxing coach of author Ed Latimore.

Yankello has gained recognition for his charity work in assisting at-risk youth through his non-profit Stay Off the Streets, Inc. organization based in his native Ambridge, PA.

== Boxing career ==
During the inception of Yankello's boxing career, he competed as an amateur and was trained by Pittsburgh-area coaches Jerry Maggio, Ray Palladini, and Carmie Price on three occasions. After enduring four shoulder surgeries between 1989 and 1991, Yankello was forced to stop competing before he got the chance to fight professionally.

After his surgeries, Yankello briefly worked as a security officer at a juvenile delinquent center and as a child care aid for disabled, developmentally-challenged children. During this time, Yankello also began to train both amateur and professional fighters.

== Boxing trainer ==
In 1991, Yankello began managing and training amateur and professional fighters at the Beaver County Boxing Club alongside other prominent boxing trainers. In 1996, he then opened his own gym, Tom Yankello's World Class Boxing. His vision was to create a boxing gym which catered to all levels of experience and ability, whether amateur or professional.

Yankello is one of the most respected minds in the sport of boxing; his most notable ward is former IBF Lightweight Champion, Paul Spadafora. Yankello was also the trainer of former IBA Super featherweight champion Monty-Meza Clay. The American boxing trainer then worked with Roy Jones Jr. during a number of fights which prompted Jones winning the UBO International Cruiserweight Title against opponent Max Alexander.

Yankello went on to be the trainer of United States 2000 Super Heavyweight Olympian Calvin Brock for 30 bouts; this included Brock winning and defending the IBA Continental America Heavyweight Title and challenging Wladimir Klitschko for the IBF Heavyweight title. Yankello is currently working with 2 time Olympian and top 15 ranked fighter of the world, Heavyweight Ivan Dychko. Yankello also trained UFC champion Cody Garbrandt when he lived in Pittsburgh, PA. Yankello trained Brian Minto for the majority of his professional career, including a victory over Axel Schulz and challenging Marco Huck for the WBO cruiserweight title.

Yankello worked as a trainer for 9-time amateur champion Verquan Kimbrough; as of now. He currently trains 2018 National Golden Glove champion Kiante Irving. He is also currently training 2 time Pennsylvania State Golden Glove Champion, Danny Bodish. Danny turned as a professional boxer in October 2024.

== Personal life ==
Tom Yankello is married to Tina (Bigante) Yankello. Together, the couple has two sons: Tommy and Rocco Yankello. Tom's brother, Mark Yankello, was heavily involved in the business side of boxing and sells commercial real estate.

== Photos ==
https://www.facebook.com/TomYankello

== YouTube Channel ==
Visit the World Class Boxing Channel at https://www.youtube.com/channel/UCFd-tIEZTYhdR3lWCQ7inyg?view_as=subscriber
