= Bob Gaona =

American football player (1931–2001)

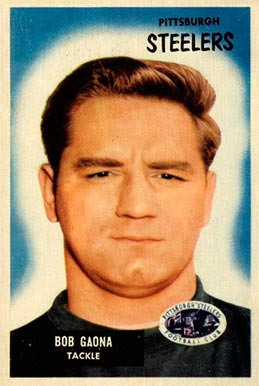
- Gaona on a 1955 Bowman football card

No. 72, 71
- Position: Offensive tackle

Personal information
- Born: January 3, 1931; Ambridge, Pennsylvania, U.S.
- Died: May 23, 2001 (aged 70); Durham, North Carolina, U.S.
- Listed height: 6 ft 3 in (1.91 m)
- Listed weight: 243 lb (110 kg)

Career information
- College: Wake Forest
- NFL draft: 1953: 5th round, 54th overall pick

Career history
- Pittsburgh Steelers (1953–1956); Philadelphia Eagles (1957)

Career NFL statistics
- Games played: 60
- Games started: 58
- Fumble recoveries: 2
- Stats at Pro Football Reference

Robert John Gaona (January 3, 1931 – May 23, 2001) was an American professional football player who played offense, defense, and special teams for three seasons for the Pittsburgh Steelers and Philadelphia Eagles.
