= Continental Engineering Corporation =

Taiwanese construction company

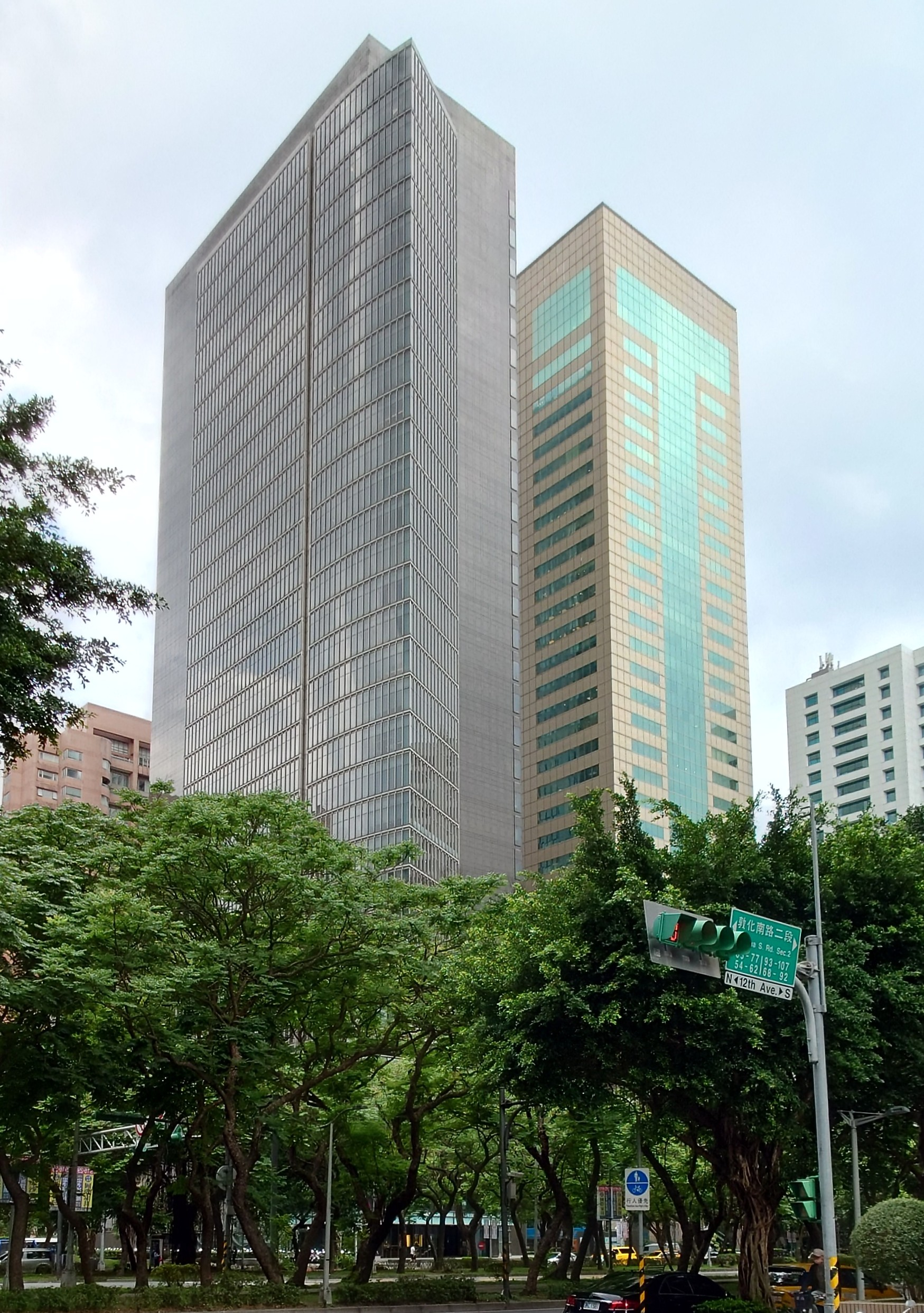
- CEC Headquarters (left)
- Native name: 大陸工程股份有限公司
- Company type: Public company
- Industry: Construction
- Predecessor: Wei Dah Corporation
- Founded: 29 December 1945; 80 years ago in Shanghai
- Founder: Glyn T. H. Ing
- Headquarters: No. 95 Dunhua Road Sec. 2 Da'an, Taipei, Taiwan
- Key people: Nita Ing (Chairperson); Simon Buttery (CEO)
- Parent: Continental Holdings Corporation
- Website: www.continental-engineering.com

Continental Engineering Corporation (CEC; Chinese: 大陸工程公司; pinyin: Dàlù Gōngchéng Gōngsī) is a large Taiwanese construction company.

== History ==
The company was originally founded by Glyn T. H. Ing in 1941 as Wei Dah Corporation in Chongqing, Sichuan. In 1945, the company was restructured to become Continental Engineering Corporation (CEC) and its headquarters was moved to Shanghai. It also set up branch offices in Nanjing and Taipei. Towards the end of Chinese Civil War, CEC moved to Taiwan in 1948. In 1986, the company underwent restructuring movement from family-run business to become a modern and professionally managed corporation. In 1994, the company became a publicly listed company on the Taiwan Stock Exchange (TWSE). In 2005, the company set up branch offices outside Taiwan in Hong Kong, India, Macau and Malaysia. In 2010, Continental Holdings Corporation (CHC) was established and publicly listed on TWSE. CEC was then delisted from the stock exchange and became a subsidiary of CHC.

CEC has successfully completed many significant infrastructure projects, including major civil construction works involving viaducts, bridges, and tunnels for highway, metro, and railway projects. The company was also one of the principal consortium investors and contractors for the US$17 billion Taiwan High Speed Rail, one of the world's largest Build, Operate, and Transfer (BOT) projects.

== Projects ==
- Taipei Grand Mosque
- Tomb of Bai Chongxi
- Shilin Official Residence of Chiang Kai-shek
- Grand Hotel (Taipei)
- United States Taiwan Defense Command barracks
- Fu Jen Catholic University Gymnasium
- Saudi Arabia Ministry of Industry and Electricity Headquarters Building
- Taiwan High Speed Rail
- Taipei Metro Banqiao Line (TRTS)
- Taipei Metro Nangang Line (TRTS)
- Taipei Metro Neihu Line (TRTS)
- Taiwan Taoyuan International Airport Access Mass Rapid Transit System
- Taoyuan International Airport Airport rail link
- Delhi metro using 4 shield TBM's
- Jaipur Metro Phase 1B using two Robbins EPB machines
- Noida- Greater Noida metro.
- Malaysia Kuala Lumpur Metro KVMRT SBK Line Package C
- Contract SSG506 - Kai Tak - Hong Kong - Station Square
- Contract CV/2013/08 - Liantang/ Heung Yuen Wai Boundary Control Point - Contract 6 - Hong Kong
- Contract DC/2012/02 - Mui Wo - Hong Kong - Upgrading of Sewage Treatment Works
- Contract DC/2009/18- Stonecutters Island - Hong Kong - HATS Tunnel
- Contract KL/2014/01 - Kai Tak - Hong Kong - Development at Former Runway.

Major Current domestic Public Sector projects (As of March 31, 2021)

Shield tunnels of Song-Hu~Da-An, Shen-Mei~Da-An 345kv Power Cable Transmission Lines Design and Build Project

Contract CQ842 “Station LG02; LG02 to LG03, and LG02 to LG01 TBM Tunnels Civil Construction”

Taipei Metropolitan Area Rapid Transit System Wanda- Zhonghe- Shulin Line District Contract (Phase I) CQ840 Project

Taipei Metropolitan Area Rapid Transit System Wanda- Zhonghe- Shulin Line District Contract (Phase I) CQ850A Project

Contract C214 - South Tainan Station Southern section of the Tainan Railway Underground Project

Contract C211 - Tainan Northern section of the Tainan Railway Underground Project

Contract E of the Guanci Po-Ai Park Public Housing Development Project

Taoyuan MRT Green Line Contract GC01 - Elevated Viaduct Civil Turnkey Project

Taipei Nangang Depot Public Housing Design and Build Project

Taoyuan MRT Green Line Contract GC03 - Elevated Viaduct Civil Turnkey Project

== Gallery of Images ==
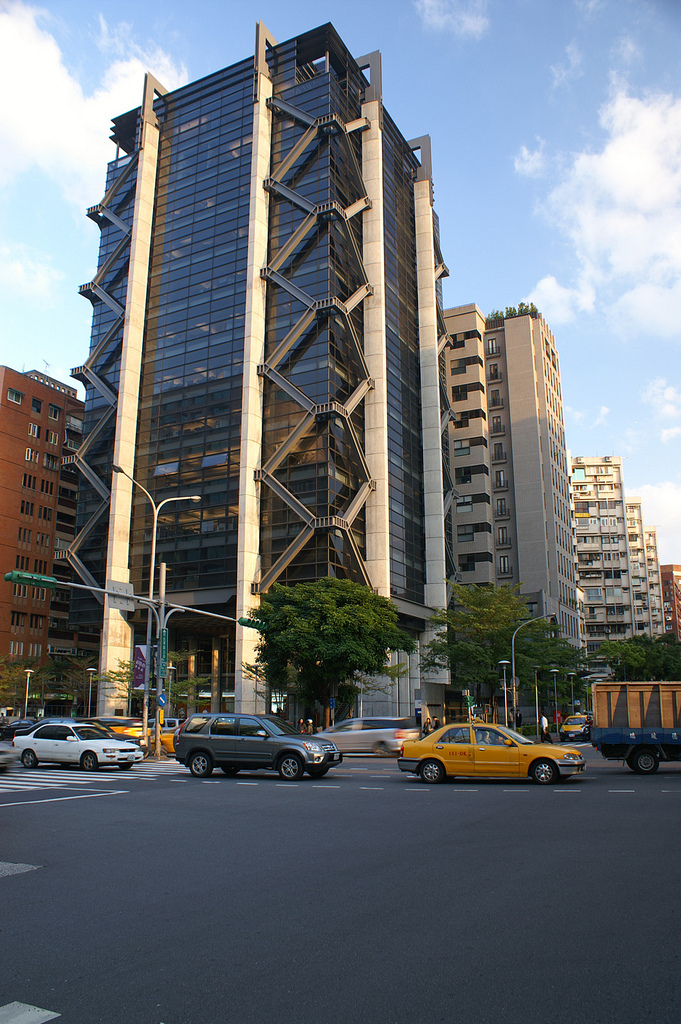
CEC Headquarters (1999-2004) in Taipei

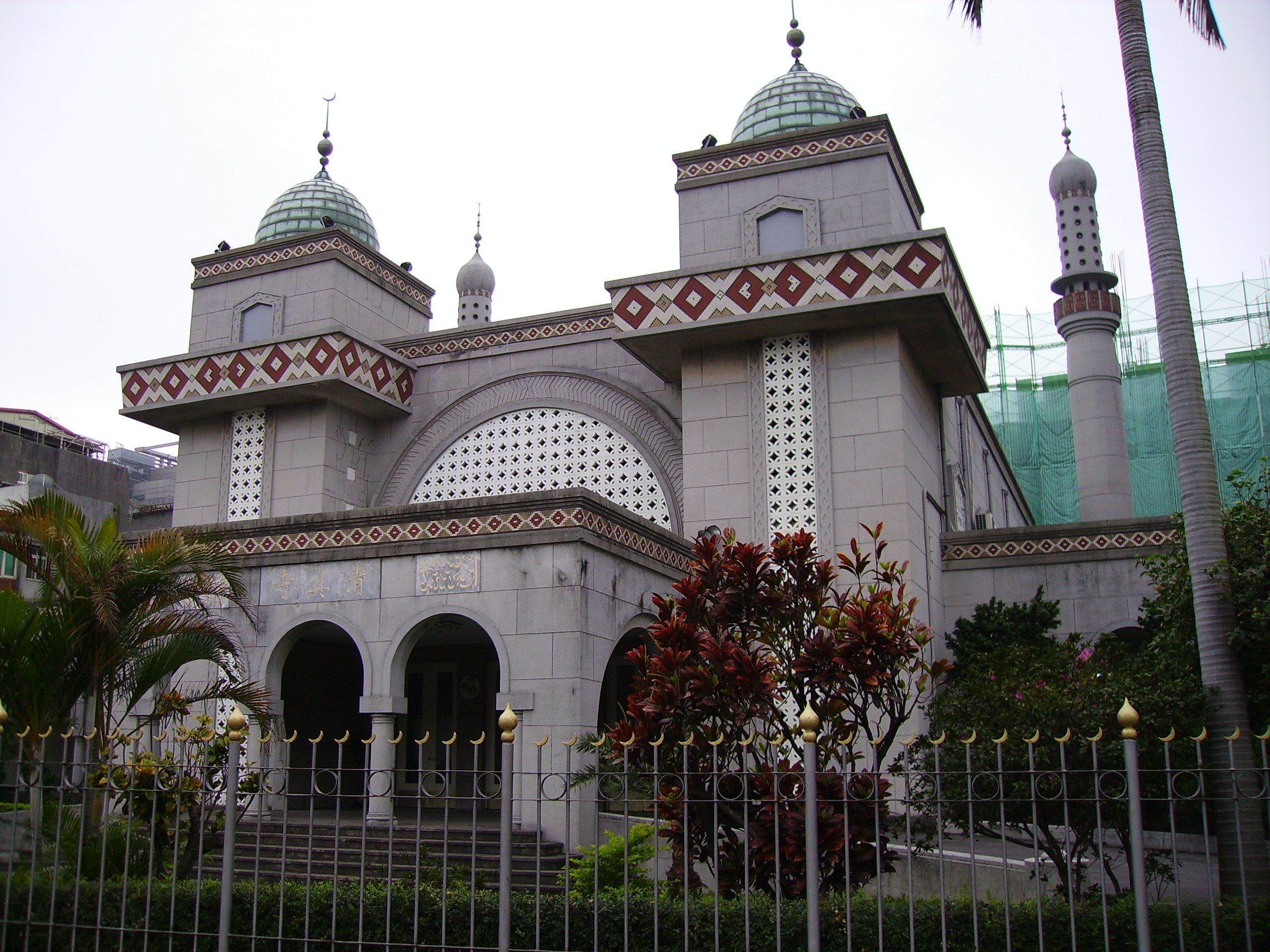
Taipei Grand Mosque in Taipei

== See also ==
- List of companies of Taiwan
- Build-operate-transfer
