= Ambridge Area High School =

Coordinates: 40.5925°N 80.2264°W

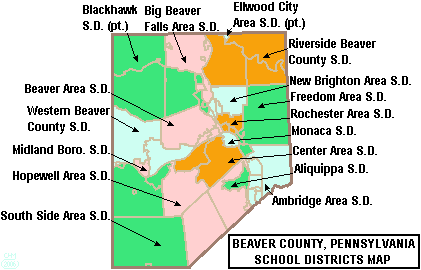

Location
- 909 Duss Avenue; Ambridge, Beaver County, Pennsylvania 15003; United States

Information
- Type: Public
- Established: 1971
- NCES District ID: 4202440
- Principal: Dr. Janice Zupsic
- Staff: 31.81 (FTE)
- Grades: 9-12
- Enrollment: 705 (2024-2025)
- Student to teacher ratio: 22.16
- Colors: Maroon and gray
- Mascot: Bridger
- Rival: Aliquippa Junior/Senior High School
- Website: www.ambridge.k12.pa.us

Ambridge High School is a midsized, suburban secondary school in Ambridge, Pennsylvania. By 2016, the school enrollment was reported as 749 pupils in grades 9th through 12th.

== Extracurriculars ==
Ambridge Area High School offers a variety of clubs, activities and sports.

=== Sports ===
The District funds:

=== Varsity ===
Boys

- Baseball - AAAA
- Basketball- AAAA
- Bowling - AAAAAA
- Cross Country - AA
- Football - AAAA
- Golf - AAA
- Soccer - AAA
- Tennis - AA
- Track and Field - AAA
- Volleyball - AA
- Wrestling - AAA

Girls

- Basketball - AAAA
- Bowling - AAAAAA
- Cross Country - AA
- Golf - AA
- Soccer (Fall) - AAA
- Softball - AAAA
- Girls' Tennis - AA
- Track and Field - AAA
- Volleyball - AAA

== Notable alumni ==
- Paul Hertneky, writer
- Susan Laughlin, politician
- John Michelosen, football player and coach
- Mike Lucci, NFL football player
- Marita Grabiak, television director
- Dianne K. Prinz, physicist, astronaut

== Notable faculty ==
- Mike Sebastian, football coach
