= Felisa Vanoff =

American dancer (1925–2014)

- Born: Phyllis Elizabeth Caputo; June 11, 1925; Ambridge, Pennsylvania, US
- Died: May 29, 2014 (aged 88); Beverly Hills, California, US
- Resting place: Sun Valley, Idaho, US
- Occupations: Dancer, choreographer, producer, philanthropist
- Spouse: Nick Vanoff
- Children: 2
- Parent(s): Eugene Caputo; Velma Lindway

Felisa Vanoff (born Phyllis Elizabeth Caputo; June 11, 1925 – May 29, 2014) was an American dancer, choreographer, producer, and philanthropist.

== Early life and education ==
Phyllis Elizabeth Caputo was born on June 11, 1925, in Ambridge, Pennsylvania. Her father, Eugene Caputo, was a Pennsylvania State Representative, and her mother, Velma Lindway, was an artist.

Shortly after she graduated from high school, she moved from Pennsylvania to Manhattan. There she lived at a boarding house and studied with Vincenzo Celli of the Ballet Russe. She then traveled to Mexico City for eighteen months of training with Jose Fernandez, learning flamenco and other Spanish dances.

== Career ==
During World War II, Vanoff performed in United Service Organizations Camp Shows in the Pacific, touring the Philippines, Korea, and Japan. By the end of the war she had earned a captaincy in the United States Army. Returning to New York City, she became the lead dancer in Charles Weidman's Dance Theatre. Later, she was featured on the Fred Waring and Billy Rose television programs.

In 1948, she became the first woman choreographer for the Hasty Pudding Theatricals, a dramatic student society at Harvard University in Cambridge, Massachusetts. The following year, she joined the New York City Opera as a lead dancer, appearing in productions like Carmen and Don Giovanni; she was also the company's assistant choreographer. In 1953, she joined the John Butler Dance Theatre where she spent two years as lead dancer, often performing alongside Glen Tetley. In 1987, she oversaw the Joffrey Ballet's recreation of Igor Stravinsky's The Rite of Spring. She won the Laurence Olivier Award for Best New Musical in 1994 for her co-produced musical City of Angels.

Other choreographic roles included the musical Carousel, which starred Bambi Linn and Rod Alexander; Sid Caesar's Your Show of Shows; and Julie Andrews: The Sound of Christmas in Salzburg. With her husband, Nick Vanoff, she also choreographed numerous Kennedy Center Honors shows.

== Philanthropy ==
With her husband, she co-founded the Vanoff Family Foundation, a philanthropic foundation headquartered in Hollywood, California, in 1984. Vanoff later worked with Gordon Davidson to set up an annual charity dinner known as Salon at the Taper, the proceeds of which went to Nick's Tix, a philanthropic organization providing access to Los Angeles Music Center concerts for low-income groups like the handicapped, the elderly, and young people.

As a member of the board of directors of the Joffrey Ballet, Vanoff was credited as a driving force in its move to Los Angeles. She also helped organize fundraising events for the Joffrey Ballet, known as "Patron Nights", with interior designer Patti Skouras. Additionally, she served on the Board of Directors of Colleagues, the Heinz Awards, and the Blue Ribbon of the Los Angeles Music Center. She took part in the Great Wagon Days Duck Race, an annual fundraising event organized by the Ketchum/Sun Valley Rotary Club in Rotary Park, a public park in Ketchum, Idaho. She also donated to the St Luke's Wood River Medical Center in Ketchum, Idaho.

Vanoff was a donor to the Sun Valley Summer Symphony, a summer festival in Sun Valley, Idaho. She was also a "Bronze Sponsor" of the National Gay and Lesbian Taskforce.

== Personal ==
She met her husband, Nick Vanoff (1929-1991), when both were dancers in the New York City Opera in the 1950s. They had two sons, Nicholas Jr. and Flavio. They resided in Beverly Hills, California, and also owned an 8,500-square-foot house in Malibu, once rented by Edgar Bronfman Jr., which she sold to Peter O'Malley in 2000. The Vanoff Black Box Theater at the Brooks School, a private boarding school in North Andover, Massachusetts from which their son Nicholas Jr. graduated in 1980, is named after her and her husband.

== Death ==
She died of cancer on May 29, 2014, at her private residence in Beverly Hills at the age of eighty-nine. She was buried in Sun Valley, Idaho, her favorite winter skiing resort.
