= Ralph Caplan =

American designer (1925–2020)

Ralph Caplan (January 4, 1925 – June 4, 2020) was an American design consultant, writer, and public speaker.

Caplan was born in Ambridge, Pennsylvania in January 1925. In 1941, he entered Earlham College for a semester, then enlisted in the Marine Corps. He was 17 years of age at the time.

After his discharge from the Marines, Caplan re-entered Earlham College, graduated, and went for his master's degree at Indiana University. He later taught at Wabash College, then moved to New York City, where he became editor of Industrial Design. He left ID to write his first book, a novel, Say Yes, which was loosely inspired by his experience at Earlham and Wabash.

Author of By Design: Why There Are No Locks on the Bathroom Doors in the Hotel Louis XIV and Other Object Lessons, Caplan also wrote about design for major design magazines and was a director emeritus of the International Design Conference in Aspen, Colorado. He is the author of The Design of Herman Miller, and was a consultant to that Michigan furniture manufacturer for more than 20 years. His book, Cracking the Whip, published in 2006, is a selection of his essays on design and its side effects.

Caplan taught design criticism at the School of Visual Arts in New York, and wrote for various print and online journals. He died in Manhattan, New York from heart failure at the age of 95 in June 2020.
