= Nick Vanoff =

American dancer, producer (1929–1991)

- Born: October 25, 1929; Vevi, Greece
- Died: March 20, 1991 (aged 61); Los Angeles, California
- Occupations: Dancer, producer, philanthropist
- Spouse: Felisa Vanoff
- Children: 2

Nick Vanoff (October 25, 1929 – March 20, 1991) was an American dancer, producer and philanthropist.

== Early life ==
Vanoff was born into a Bulgarian family in the village of Vevi, Greece, but grew up in Buffalo, New York. He served in the United States Marine Corps, and, shortly after, studied directing under Theodore Komisarjevsky in New York City.

== Career ==
Vanoff started his career as a dancer in Charles Weidman's Dance Theatre and later became a lead dancer for the New York City Opera. He was also a dancer in the Kiss Me, Kate Broadway musical.

Initially, he worked as a cue card holder on The Perry Como Show before becoming its associate producer. Vanoff co-produced The Tonight Show alongside William O. Harbach during Steve Allen's tenure as host. Additionally, he created and produced the Kennedy Center Honors. In the 1960s, he produced more than ten hours of television every week, including shows featuring Bing Crosby, Andy Williams, Don Knotts, Milton Berle and Sonny and Cher. A few decades later, in 1985, he produced the film Eleni.

Vanoff won a Tony Award for Best Musical in 1990 for his production of the Broadway musical City of Angels. Additionally, he won five Emmy Awards as a producer for: The Julie Andrews Hour in 1973, The Kennedy Center Honors in 1984, 1987 and 1989, and Julie Andrews's special, The Sound of Christmas, in 1988. In 1990, he was named Showman of the Year by the Publicists Guild of America (which later merged into the International Alliance of Theatrical Stage Employees).

Vanoff was a founding director of the Foundation for the Joffrey Ballet and served on the board of directors of the Center Theatre Group in Los Angeles.

== Personal life ==
Vanoff was married to Felisa Vanoff (1925-2014), and they had two sons, Nicholas and Flavio. They resided in Beverly Hills, California.

== Death ==
Vanoff died of cardiac arrest at the Ronald Reagan UCLA Medical Center in Los Angeles, California, at the age of 61. His funeral was held at the Church of the Good Shepherd in Beverly Hills, California.
