= Ambridge, Pennsylvania =

Borough in Pennsylvania, US

- Borough
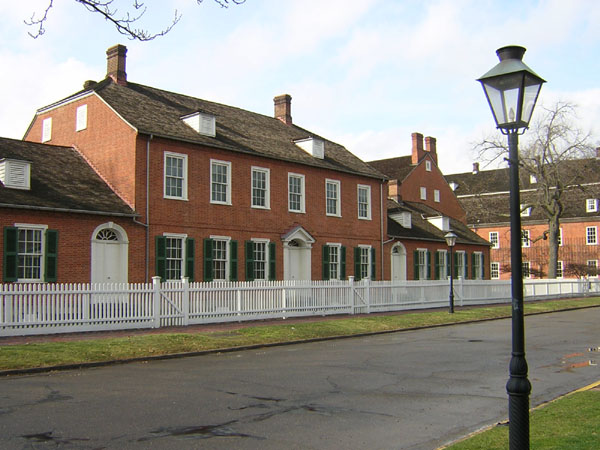
- The Rapp House in Old Economy Village
- Motto: Proud Past, Bright Future
- Interactive map of Ambridge, Pennsylvania
- Location within Pennsylvania Location within the United States
- Coordinates: 40°35′35″N 80°13′31″W
- Country: United States
- State: Pennsylvania
- County: Beaver
- Settled: 1824
- Incorporated: 1905

Government
  - Type: Borough Council
  - Mayor: Gerald “Duke” McCoy

Area
  - Total: 1.70 sq mi (4.41 km^{2})
  - Land: 1.49 sq mi (3.85 km^{2})
  - Water: 0.21 sq mi (0.55 km^{2})
- Elevation: 764 ft (233 m)

Population (2020)
  - Total: 6,972
  - Density: 4,687.9/sq mi (1,810.01/km^{2})
- Time zone: UTC-5 (Eastern (EST))
  - Summer (DST): UTC-4 (EDT)
- Zip code: 15003
- Area code: 724
- FIPS code: 42-02288
- Website: www.ambridgeboro.org

Ambridge is a borough in Beaver County, Pennsylvania, United States. Incorporated in 1905 as a company town by the American Bridge Company, Ambridge is located 16 miles (26 km) northwest of Pittsburgh along the Ohio River. The population was 6,972 at the 2020 census.

== History ==
The town is near the location of Legionville, the training camp for General "Mad" Anthony Wayne's Legion of the United States. Wayne's was the first attempt to provide basic training for regular U.S. Army recruits and Legionville was the first facility established expressly for this purpose. The Harmony Society first settled the area in the early 19th century, founding the village of "Ökonomie" or Economy in 1824. Although initially successful, accumulating significant landholdings, the sect went into decline. By the end of the 19th century, only a few Harmonists remained. The society was dissolved and its vast real estate holdings sold, much of it to the American Bridge Company, who subsequently enlarged the town and incorporated it as Ambridge in 1905.

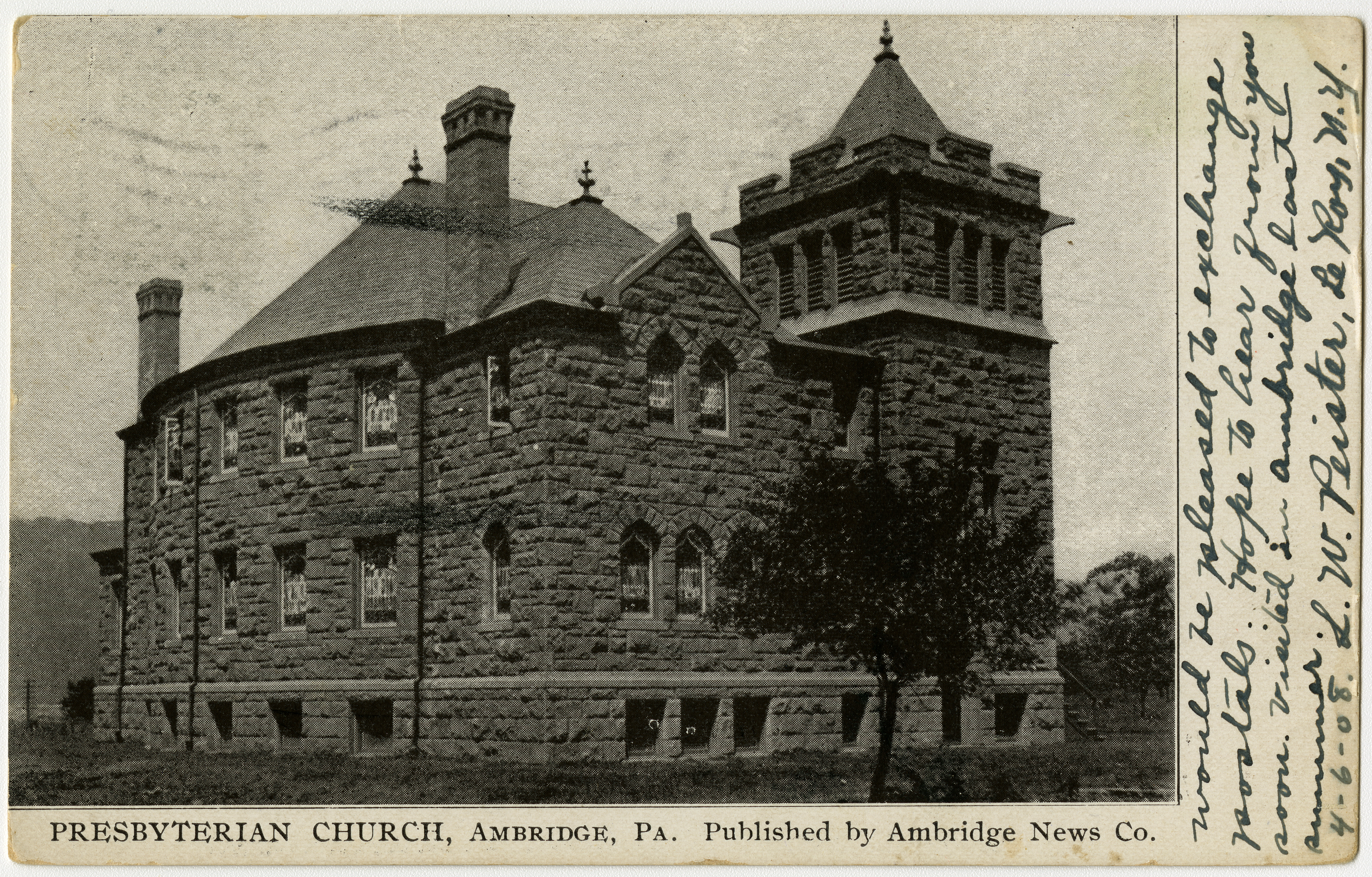
Presbyterian church in Ambridge from a pre-1923 postcard.

American Bridge attracted thousands of immigrants who came to fulfill their dreams of work, freedom, and peace. The steel mills became the focal point of the town. Most of the employees were relatives of relatives and the small town grew, with wards separating the town into ethnic sections. In addition, many of the ethnicities had their own church, club, and musical group that sought to give immigrants a familiar place to be as well as to preserve their culture. Many were from Eastern and Southern Europe including Italian, Greek, Slovak, Croatian, Ukrainian, Polish, Slovene, and Carpathian Ruthenia, to name a few.

With the growth of the steel mills, Ambridge became a worldwide leader in steel production. The borough became known for bridge building, metal molding, and the manufacture of tubes (large iron pipes). During World War II, the American Bridge Company fabricated steel for the building of LSTs (Landing Ship Tanks). The steel was then sent by rail to the adjacent American Bridge naval shipyard in Leetsdale, Pennsylvania, where the LSTs were built. The area was also home to several other steel mills like Armco, the pipe mill which manufactured oil piping, and A. M. Byers, a major iron and tool fabricator. Eventually competition by foreign steel producers began to cause the share of the steel market for U.S. manufacturers to dwindle. With the shift of steel production overseas, the American Bridge Company ended operations in Ambridge in 1983. The legacy of American Bridge can be seen today in bridges around the world.

The decline of both the steel industry and the town is chronicled in Rust Belt Boy by Ambridge native Paul Hertneky.

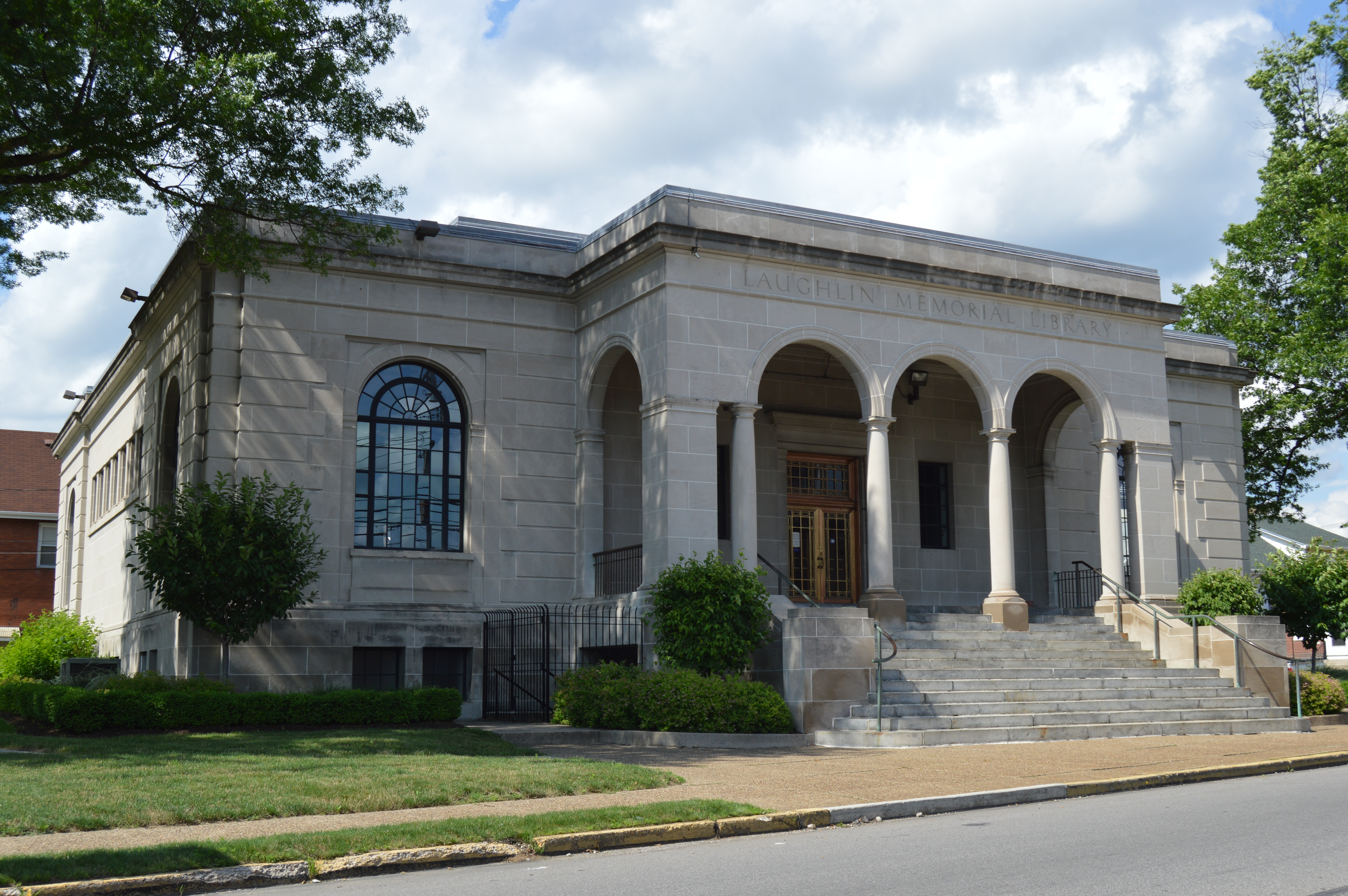
Laughlin Memorial Library

With Ambridge now over 100 years old, revitalization is beginning to occur along Merchant Street in the Downtown Commercial District. Entrepreneurs and investors have begun to renovate the Victorian facades of the commercial storefronts. Antique shops are opening in the Historic District, which is also a National Historic Landmark, and a once industrial warehouse area is being converted to condominiums, shops, and parks. In 2007 Ambridge was designated as a Preserve America Community by the White House. Convenient to Pittsburgh along the Ohio River Boulevard and just across the Ohio River from the Pittsburgh International Airport, Ambridge leaders hope it will benefit by its location and low cost of living.

== Geography ==
Ambridge is located at 40°35′35″N 80°13′31″W (40.593167, −80.225200), along the Ohio River.

According to the United States Census Bureau, the borough has a total area of 1.7 square miles (4.4 km^{2}), of which 1.5 square miles (3.9 km^{2}) is land and 0.2 square miles (0.5 km^{2}) (12.87%) is water.

=== Surrounding and adjacent neighborhoods ===
Ambridge has two land borders, including Harmony Township to the north, east and northeast, and the Allegheny County borough of Leetsdale to the southwest. The city of Aliquippa runs adjacent to Ambridge across the Ohio River to the west and is connected to the borough via Ambridge-Aliquippa Bridge.

== Demographics ==
Historical population
Census	Pop.	Note	%±
1910	5,205		—
1920	12,730		144.6%
1930	20,227		58.9%
1940	18,968		−6.2%
1950	16,429		−13.4%
1960	13,865		−15.6%
1970	11,324		−18.3%
1980	9,575		−15.4%
1990	8,133		−15.1%
2000	7,769		−4.5%
2010	7,050		−9.3%
2020	6,972		−1.1%
2021 (est.)	6,869	▼	−1.5%

As of the 2000 census, there were 7,769 people, 3,595 households, and 1,966 families residing in the borough. The population density was 5,179.3 inhabitants per square mile (1,999.7/km^{2}). There were 4,099 housing units at an average density of 2,760.9 per square mile (1,066.0/km^{2}). The racial makeup of the borough was 85.69% White, 11.38% African American, 0.08% Native American, 0.45% Asian, 0.01% Pacific Islander, 0.73% from other races, and 1.66% from two or more races. Hispanic or Latino of any race were 1.83% of the population.

There were 3,595 households, out of which 23.2% had children under the age of 18 living with them, 32.6% were married couples living together, 16.9% had a female householder with no husband present, and 45.3% were non-families. 39.8% of all households were made up of individuals, and 18.5% had someone living alone who was 65 years of age or older. The average household size was 2.14 and the average family size was 2.88.

In the borough the population was spread out, with 21.7% under the age of 18, 7.9% from 18 to 24, 27.2% from 25 to 44, 20.2% from 45 to 64, and 23.0% who were 65 years of age or older. The median age was 40 years. For every 100 females, there were 89.6 males. For every 100 females age 18 and over, there were 85.9 males.

The median income for a household in the borough was $26,263, and the median income for a family was $35,529. Males had a median income of $30,996 versus $21,455 for females. The per capita income for the borough was $15,089. About 16.4% of families and 17.8% of the population were below the poverty line, including 26.3% of those under age 18 and 14.1% of those age 65 or over.

== Arts and culture ==
Although the different ethnic groups of Ambridge have blended over time, the community continues to recognize the origins from which it came. Since 1966, Ambridge has held an annual heritage festival celebrating the borough's ethnic pride. Diversity in food, music, and entertainment continues to unite the community in remembering its origins. Organized by the Ambridge Chamber of Commerce, the three-day Nationality Days festival takes place in May and is located in the heart of the downtown Commercial District. Vendors line the center of Merchant Street as thousands of attendees – locals and tourists – enjoy Italian, Ukrainian, Greek, Polish, German, Croatian, and Slovenian cuisine. Booths are sponsored by numerous churches in Ambridge, bringing with them the recipes for their cultural dishes such as pirohy, haluski, stuffed cabbage, and borscht. Live entertainment, arts and crafts, and children's activities are also available. Thousands visit this festival daily (located on Merchant Street from 4th Street to 8th Street).

=== Old Economy Village ===
Ambridge is the home of Old Economy Village, a National Historic Landmark administered by the Pennsylvania Historical and Museum Commission. The site interprets the Harmony Society, one of America's most successful 19th century Christian communal societies. Old Economy Village also provides public education and preservation of the society's unique material culture. Founded by George Rapp, it was the third and final location of the Harmonites. Established in 1824, Old Economy - known to the Harmonites as "Ökonomie" - was founded upon German Pietism, which called for a higher level of purity within Christianity. Soon the Harmonites were not only known for their piety, but also for their production of wool, cotton, and silk. As a pioneer in the American silk industry, Economy became known as the American silk center in the 1830s and 1840s. Today, the site maintains seventeen carefully restored structures and gardens that were built between 1824 and 1830. The buildings reflect the unusual lifestyle of the organization, which, by the 1840s, was renowned for its economic success in textile production. The site also portrays the community's involvement with agricultural production, railroads, and oil. The recreated gardens encompass more than 2 acres (8,100 m^{2}), providing colorful 19th century flowers. The gardens' formal pathways, stone pavilion, and seasonal flowering hedges are among the striking features. Old Economy's buildings, grounds, library, archives, and 16,000 original artifacts are fused to create an interpretive facility for the Commonwealth.

== Education ==
Ambridge is served by the public Ambridge Area School District, which operates five schools: Economy, Highland and State Street elementary schools (grades PK–5); Ambridge Area Junior High School (grades 6–8), and Ambridge Area High School (grades 9–12). High school students may choose to attend the Beaver County Career and Technology Center for training in the construction and mechanical trades.

Ambridge is also home to Trinity School for Ministry, an evangelical seminary in the Anglican tradition.

== Notable people ==
- Richard D. Adams, U.S. Navy Admiral and first husband of actress Martha O'Driscoll
- Peter A. Angeles, philosopher and atheist writer
- George C. Axtell, United States Marine Corps general officer, World War II flying ace, and Navy Cross recipient
- Eric Burns, journalist
- Ralph Caplan, design consultant, writer, and public speaker
- Eugene Caputo, lawyer and member of the Pennsylvania House of Representatives from 1932 to 1938
- D. F. Creighton, architect, mechanical engineer, and construction manager
- Ann B. Davis, actress best known for roles in The Brady Bunch and The Bob Cummings Show
- Jerry Dennerlein, American football player for the New York Giants
- Bob Gaona, American football player for the Pittsburgh Steelers and Philadelphia Eagles
- Marita Grabiak, television director
- Matt Magnone, American youtuber
- Don Granitz, Christian missionary, American football player and coach
- Robert K. Hamilton, 76th Speaker of the Pennsylvania House of Representatives
- Paul Hertneky, journalist and author
- George Kisiday, American football player for the Buffalo Bills and Jersey City Giants
- Fred Klages, baseball pitcher for the Chicago White Sox
- Bill Koman, American football player for the Baltimore Colts, Philadelphia Eagles, and the Chicago/St. Louis Cardinals
- Charles P. Laughlin, member of the Pennsylvania House of Representatives from the 16th District
- Mike Lucci, American football player for the Cleveland Browns and Detroit Lions
- Mickey Marotti, American football coach and administrator
- Robert Matzie, member of the Pennsylvania House of Representatives from the 16th District
- Elise Mercur, architect
- John Michelosen, American football player and coach for the Pittsburgh Steelers and University of Pittsburgh
- Chuck Mrazovich, basketball player for the Anderson Packers, Indianapolis Olympians, and Wilkes-Barre Barons
- Leo Nobile, American football player for the Washington Redskins and Pittsburgh Steelers
- George Rapp, founder of the Harmony Society and Old Economy Village
- David D. Thompson, U.S. Space Force General who is currently the Vice Chief of Space Operations
- Guy Travaglio, member of the Pennsylvania House of Representatives from the 11th District
- Harry Ulinski, American football player for the Washington Redskins and Ottawa Rough Riders
- Felisa Vanoff, dancer, choreographer, producer, and philanthropist
- Dennis Wuycik, basketball player for the Carolina Cougars/Spirits of St. Louis
- Thomas Yankello, boxing trainer, YouTube content creator
- David Zubik, bishop of the Roman Catholic Diocese of Pittsburgh

== See also ==
- List of cities and towns along the Ohio River
- Old Economy Village
- Harmony Society
- Harmony, Pennsylvania
- Rock the World Youth Mission Alliance
