= American Bridge Company =

American heavy/civil construction firm

- Type: Subsidiary
- Industry: Civil Engineering
- Founded: 1900; 126 years ago
- Headquarters: Coraopolis, Pennsylvania, U.S.
- Key people: Frank Renda (CEO)
- Products: bridge building construction marine structures
- Revenue: ▲$328 million USD
- Number of employees: 500
- Parent: Southland Holdings LLC
- Website: americanbridge.net

The American Bridge Company is a heavy/civil construction firm that specializes in building and renovating bridges and other large, complex structures. Founded in 1900, the company is headquartered in Coraopolis, Pennsylvania, a suburb of Pittsburgh. The firm has built many bridges in the U.S. and elsewhere; the Historic American Engineering Record notes at least 81. American Bridge has also built or helped build the Willis Tower, the Empire State Building, the Chrysler Building, launch pads, resorts, and more. During World War II, it produced tank landing ships (LSTs) for the United States Navy. In 2020, American Bridge Company was acquired by Southland Holdings LLC.

== History ==
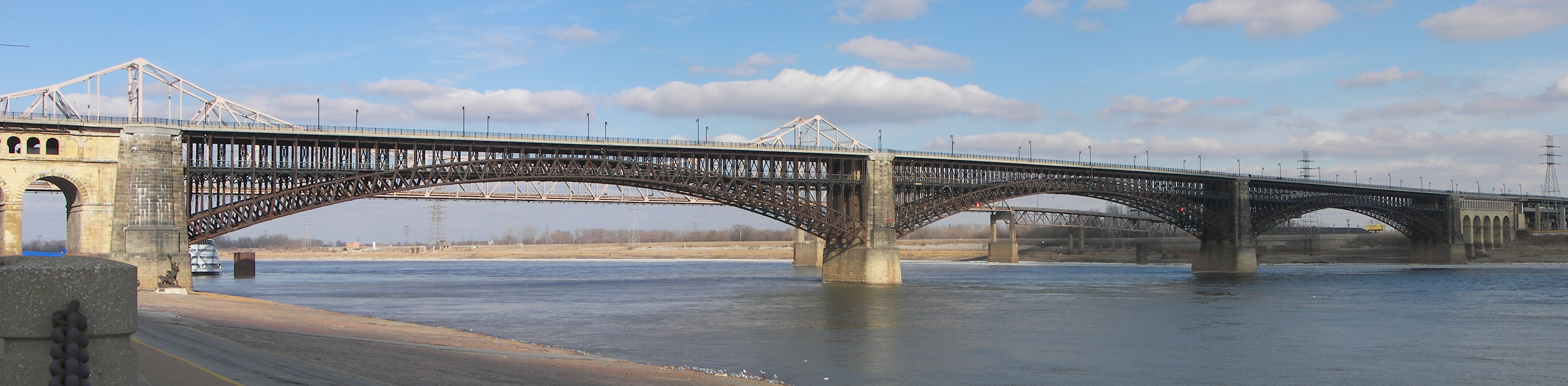
The Eads Bridge on the Mississippi River, the first major bridge built primarily of steel, was constructed by one of American Bridge Co.'s antecedents in 1874.

American Bridge Company was founded in April 1900, when J.P. Morgan & Co. led a consolidation of 28 of the largest U.S. steel fabricators and constructors. The company's roots extend to the late 1860s, when one of the consolidated firms, Keystone Bridge Company, built the Eads Bridge at St. Louis, the first steel bridge over the Mississippi River and still in use. In 1902, the company became a subsidiary of United States Steel as part of the Steel Trust consolidation.

The company pioneered the use of steel as a construction material; developing the means and methods for fabrication and construction that allowed it to be widely used in buildings, bridges, vessels, and other plate applications. It went on to do work across the nation and around the world.

During World War II, the company built warships for the U.S. Navy. In 1944, American painter Thomas Hart Benton recorded the construction and launch of LST 768, producing numerous drawings and a painting, Cut the Line.

The company went private in 1987 and was sold to Continental Engineering Corporation in 1988.

The town of Ambridge, Pennsylvania, was an American Bridge company town (thus the name "Ambridge"), and is near their current headquarters of Coraopolis, Pennsylvania. Both municipalities are on the Ohio River near Pittsburgh, with access to many steel suppliers, as well as to waterborne and rail transport, to allow shipment of components and subassemblies.

In October 2020, American Bridge Company was acquired by Southland Holdings LLC, a Grapevine, Texas-based infrastructure company, for an undisclosed amount. At the time of the purchase, Southland stated that the company would keep its name and local staff.

== Notable projects ==
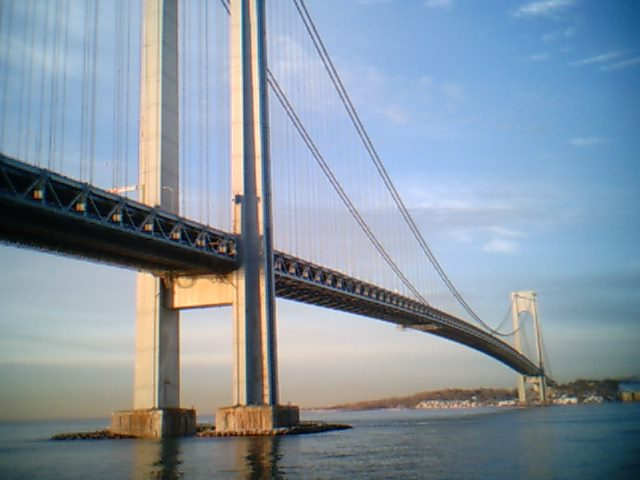
Verrazzano–Narrows Bridge, New York Harbor

This is a representative list, not an exhaustive one.

=== Bridges ===
- 1905 Puente Molcaxac, Molcaxac Puebla México, Entre Santa Cruz Huitziltepec y San Andres Miniahuapan
- 1906 CORP South Umpqua River Bridge, Myrtle Creek, Oregon
- 1908 Puente Negro, Culiacan, México
- 1910 Willow Creek Bridge, Madras, Oregon
- 1923 Francisco de Sá Bridge, Três Lagoas, Mato Grosso do Sul, Brazil
- 1926 Hercilio Luz Bridge, Florianópolis, Santa Catarina, Brazil
- 1927 Silver Bridge, Point Pleasant, West Virginia
- 1936 San Francisco–Oakland Bay Bridge, San Francisco–Oakland, California
- 1939 Exchange Street Bridge, Athol, Massachusetts
- 1950 William Cullen Bryant Viaduct, Flower Hill–Roslyn, New York
- 1957 Mackinac Bridge, Straits of Mackinac, Michigan
- 1961 Puente Hermanos Patiño, Santiago, Dominican Republic
- 1964 Verrazzano–Narrows Bridge, New York Harbor
- 1965 Rio Grande Gorge Bridge, Taos, New Mexico
- 1966 25 de Abril Bridge, Lisbon, Portugal
- 1997 Macarthur Causeway, Miami, Florida
- 2017 Genesee Arch Bridge, Letchworth State Park, Portageville, New York

Built the longest concrete segmental cable stay bridge in the United States:

- 1986 Sunshine Skyway Bridge, Tampa Bay, Florida

Built the longest suspension bridge in South America, and one of the longest in Europe:

- 1967 Orinoco Bridge, Venezuela
- 1966 April 25 Bridge, Lisbon, Portugal

Built the world's longest arch bridge on three occasions:

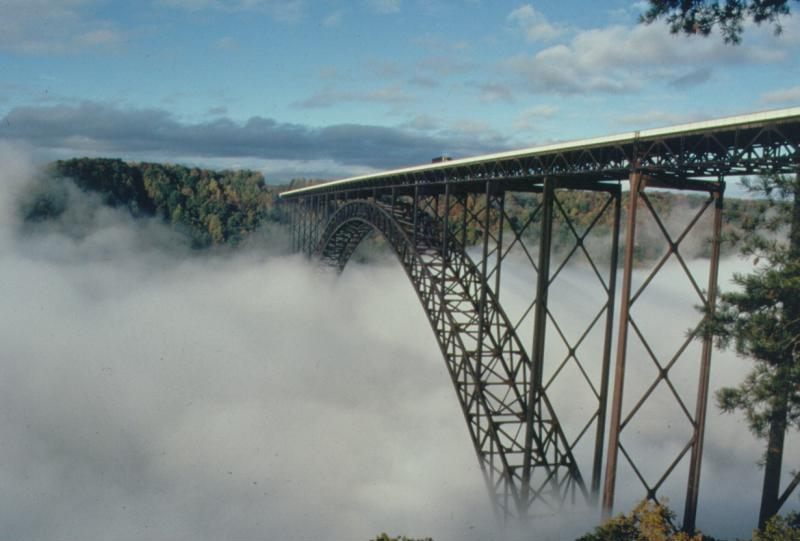
New River Gorge Bridge, West Virginia

- 1977 New River Gorge Bridge, West Virginia, 518 meters, (1,700')
- 1932 Bayonne Bridge, Staten Island–New Jersey, 504 meters (1,652')
- 1916 Hell Gate Bridge, New York City, 298 meters (978')

Built the world's longest self-supporting continuous truss bridge:

- 1966 Astoria Bridge, Oregon, 376 meters (1,232')

Renovations of existing bridges:

- 1995 Moved an existing Norfolk Southern vertical lift bridge from Florence, Alabama, to Hannibal, Missouri,
- 1998 First aerial spinning for additional main cables on a loaded, fully operational suspension bridge. April 25 Bridge in Lisbon, Portugal
- 2001 First stiffening truss replacement on a loaded, fully operational suspension bridge. Lions Gate Bridge, Vancouver, British Columbia, Canada
- 2002 Eastern span replacement of the San Francisco–Oakland Bay Bridge, in a joint venture with Fluor Corporation, American Bridge-Fluor.

=== Buildings ===
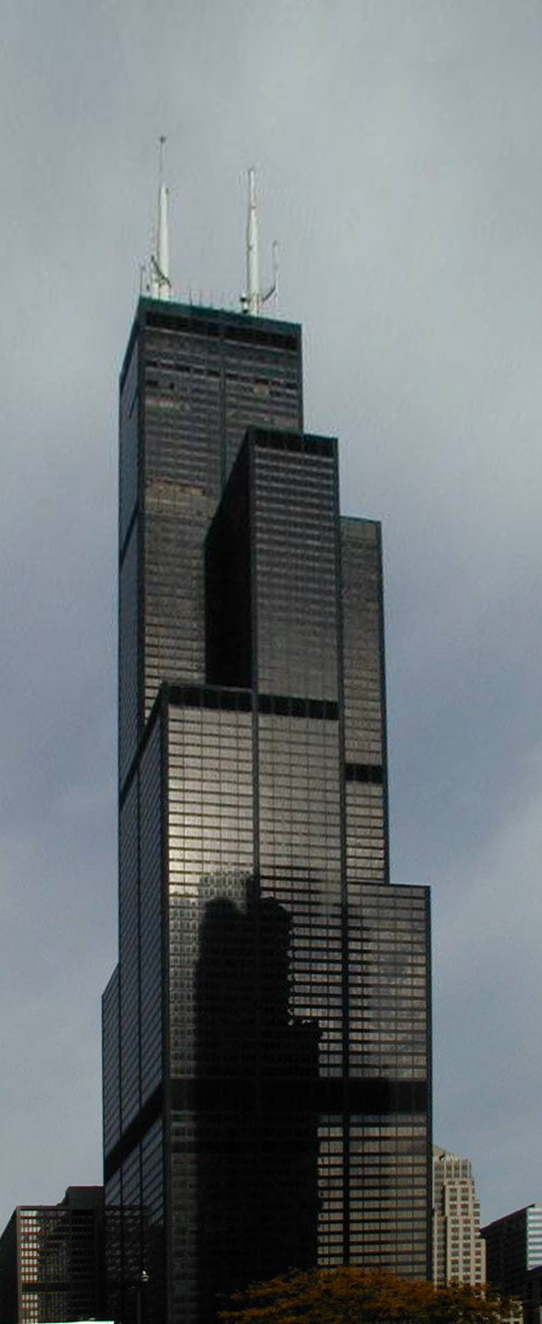
Sears Tower, Chicago, Illinois

Built the world's tallest building on numerous occasions.

- 1913 Woolworth Building, New York City
- 1930 Chrysler Building, New York City
- 1931 Empire State Building, New York City
- 1974 Sears Tower, Chicago

Built many other well-known buildings.

- 1902 Flatiron Building, New York City
- 1969 John Hancock Center, Chicago
- 1969 John Hancock Tower, Boston
- 1971 U.S. Steel Tower, Pittsburgh
- 1971 Disney's Contemporary Resort, Orlando
- 1973 Aon Center, Chicago
- 1975 Columbia Center, Seattle

Built the world's largest building by volume twice.

- 1966 Vehicle Assembly Building, Titusville
- 1967 Boeing Everett Factory, Everett

Built two large domed stadium structures.

- 1964 Houston Astrodome
- 1974 Louisiana Superdome

=== Miscellaneous ===
- Space launch complex jacking for McDonnell Douglas Astronautics (now Boeing) (1994)
- Built bottom framework for the unique, modular room units for Walt Disney Company at the Contemporary Resort in Walt Disney World (1971).
- Hammerhead Crane, 350ton Cantilever type, (Norfolk Naval Shipyard), (1940)
- Hunters Point Gantry Crane, world's largest, 460 ton capacity, (Hunters Point Naval Shipyard), (1947)
- Matterhorn Bobsleds in Disneyland, the steel structure inside the mountain, used 2,175 steel pieces.

== See also ==
- Cardwell v. American Bridge Co.
- Continental Engineering Corporation
