= Dilbert (character) =

- Dilbert character
- First appearance: April 16, 1989 in Dilbert
- Created by: Scott Adams
- Voiced by: Daniel Stern (TV series); Daniel Roberts (animated Ringtales shorts); Kelly Connell (Dilbert's Desktop Games)

In-universe information
- Species: Human
- Gender: Male
- Family: Dilmom (mother), Dadbert (father)
- Nationality: American

Dilbert is a fictional character and the main character and protagonist of the comic strip of the same name, created by Scott Adams. The character has ideas which are typically sensible and occasionally even revolutionary, but they are rarely pursued because he is relentlessly belittled powerless due to his less technically inclined and more aggressive co-workers. He is frustrated by the incompetence of his co-workers and the systematic malevolent mangaging policies of his boss referred to simply as the "Pointy-Haired Boss" and often is sarcastic and snide. He was voiced by Daniel Stern in the television show.

== Character description ==
In May 1995, the Press Enterprise called Dilbert a once-in-a-decade "angst-ridden anti-hero, a Nietzschean nebbish, an us-against-the-Universe Everyperson around whom our insecurities collect like iron shavings to a magnet". Michael Smith, a marketing professor at Temple University, called Dilbert "the Snoopy of the business world". Dilbert's unusual name was suggested to Scott Adams by a co-worker; Adams later found that the name likely came from a cartoon character, Dilbert Groundloop, an inept aviator used by the United States Navy during World War II. In an interview with The New York Times Adams said that he based Dilbert's character on someone he knew, saying: "I worked around engineers for most of my 16 years of corporate life. Dilbert is actually designed after one person in particular. Interestingly, that person is not aware that he is the model for Dilbert. I didn’t know him well and never mentioned it to him."

In December 1995, the Rochester Democrat and Chronicle noted Dilbert's "thick glasses, to deflect all attempts at eye contact", his "two pens in pocket, in case one goes bad in a crucial situation", his "oversized waistline, the result of a zero-impact exercise plan", and pants, "strategically cuffed above the ankle to remain dry in case of sudden floods". Dilbert usually has no visible mouth or eyes. In more recent strips the mouth has been drawn on occasions when Dilbert is eating, furious, nervous, or in agony. On October 10, 2013, Dilbert's mouth was drawn for the first time as he was speaking normally.

=== Necktie ===
In nearly every strip, Dilbert's tie is curved upward. Scott Adams, the creator of the Dilbert comic strip, explained the tie as a further example of Dilbert's lack of power over his environment, and there is "no sexual or satanic meaning" to it. A second explanation given by Adams in the Dilbert FAQ is that "he is just glad to see you". Adams has also hinted that the tie may be displaying an aversion to him (one series of strips had Dogbert attempt to find out: he tries having Ratbert eat one of the ties, theorizes that it has an aversion to him, and eventually gives up after a discussion with the garbageman). Additionally, in Seven Years of Highly Defective People, Adams wrote: "Many readers asked me to allow Dilbert to lose his innocence with Liz, so to speak. But I didn't see any way I could do that in a comic strip and get it past the editors. So I developed a secret sign. I told the people who receive the Dilbert newsletter that if Dilbert ever got lucky with Liz, I would draw his normally upturned necktie flat one day."

The flat-necktie strip was printed on August 9, 1994, in which Dogbert suspected that Dilbert had gotten lucky; ironically, the tie was shown flattened after Liz stated she did not believe in fornication (Dogbert wondered if Dilbert, who was acting oddly serene, had discovered religion; Dilbert said he "thought he was Unitarian"). In another strip, Dilbert met Antina, an overly masculine female coworker who caused his tie to flatten and point downward. On January 11, 2011, Dilbert was diagnosed with pon farr which caused an irresistible urge to mate. His tie was straight for the next two strips. Sometimes when Dilbert is surprised, scared, or has been beaten up, his tie goes straight.

In the strip published October 13, 2014, Dilbert announced to Dogbert that his company had a new dress code, "Business Dorky". Dilbert's white shirt and striped tie were replaced with a red polo shirt and a badge on a lanyard. Subsequent strips published Monday through Saturday show all of the company employees wearing this same outfit, with the polo shirts varying in color between blue, green, yellow, red, orange, and purple. The Sunday strips continued to show the characters in their original outfits, until November 9, 2014.

== Relationship with other characters ==
Dilbert lives with his pets, Dogbert and Ratbert, and the three dinosaurs Bob, Rex, and Dawn. Dilbert's mother appears once in a while in the comic and the animated series. She occasionally reveals herself to have surprisingly detailed knowledge about computer technology, further belittling Dilbert. Several fans have dubbed her "Dilmom", but she is only referenced as this in the TV series episode "Hunger". Dilbert's father never appears in the strip, but Dilbert met his father once in the TV show. When Dilbert returns, he tells his mom, "There's pie." He has spent his life since Christmas 1992 at a 24-hour "All-You-Can-Eat" restaurant in the mall. As Dilbert's biggest social difficulty is getting a date, creator Scott Adams published a phone number for interested parties to call, which was still connected to an answering machine in March, 1993.

== Real world impact ==
"Poor Dilbert. He's boxed in by his corporate cubicle, surrounded by clueless supervisors, assaulted by the latest, doomed management fad. And he's a hero to thousands. Somehow, the flat-topped, four-eyed, techno-head of a cartoon character is us. And mystically, he reflects what's going on in all our neurosis-filled offices."

— Edward M. Eveld, Kansas City Star

In January 1997, Dilbert appeared on the covers of five national magazines in one week. In 2000, the Montreal Gazette noted that his visage appeared in "a wide assortment of merchandising tie-ins" such as a Visa credit card and a flavor of Ben & Jerry's ice cream (Dilbert's World Totally Nuts).

== Death and resurrection ==
In a story arc spanning from September 17 to October 9, 1990, Dilbert is killed by a wild deer and Mother Nature, although he is seen alive in an unrelated September 23, 1990 strip, but is cloned back to life by the garbage man on October 5, 1990. In March 2023, after controversial comments by Adams led to newspapers dropping the comic strip, the character died before being revived by the garbage man.
