= Ice formation on aircraft =

1943 manual published by U.S. Navy

"Ice Formation on Aircraft"
- Date: January 1943
- Series: Aerology Series
- Publisher: Washington, D.C. Navy Department, Bureau of Aeronautics Training Division

Creative team
- Writers: United States Office of the Chief of Naval Operations. Aviation Training Division.

Original publication
- Language: English

Chronology
- Followed by: "Thunderstorms"

"Ice Formation on Aircraft" was the first issue in the Aerology Series produced by the Bureau of Aeronautics Training Division, Navy Department, Washington D.C.

The issue does not credit a single author or artist for the work, as the manual is meant for training purposes and was provided to Naval Aviation Cadets.

This issue of Ice Formation on Aircraft was published in 1943.

== Physical ==
The first issue of Ice Formation on Aircraft cover features an aircraft flying in a straight line under the title, which references one of the purveying points within the issue to "maintain your flying speed".

The cover is a gradient variation of blue to white. The cover also features the insignia of the naval aviators, which is a set of wings behind an anchor and a United States flag on a shield. All of the inner pages are printed in black and white and combine illustrations with instructional text. The manual also has two holes punched through it in order for it to be placed into a binder or bound in some fashion with the other manuals in the series once they were received. The manual states on the very first page that it, plus the other issues in the series, once bound together will make a “complete text on Aerology”.

== Content ==
The issue features 40 pages. Within those 40 pages there are illustrations along with technical instructions detailing the formation of ice on aircraft. Each section of the manual deals with a type of ice and its ramifications for aircraft. The illustrations for the manual feature flight patterns during different types of icy weather as well as images that depict ice build up on essential aircraft parts such as the carburetor The end of the manual features a summary section and another section entitled “Pilot counsel”. The text also features a glossary section that defines some of the terms used throughout. Unlike some of the later releases by the Bureau of Aeronautics Training Division, such as the Sense series, this series featured less of an entertainment element for the readers. Even "Taxi Sense", an issue of the Sense series made for the same audience of navy aviators featured many more humorous illustrations than "Ice Formation on Aircraft". This issue only features one cartoonish drawing without dialogue, whereas the Sense manuals contain numerous funny illustrations for the reader.

== Film adaptation ==
"Ice formation on aircraft" was made into a short film of the same name in 1960 for instructional use. The film was produced by Walt E. Disney. The animated version of the issue is available for free viewing and download at the Internet Archive. The video features some of the very same illustrations featured within the physical manual, but provides detailed animations showing the formation of ice and appropriate flight patterns when certain types of ice are encountered. The film is 48 minutes in length and in black and white. The animated film, much like the individual issue are less for entertainment and more based on the delivery of instructional training information.
