= Dilbert Groundloop =

Comic character created after Pearl Harbor Attack

Dilbert Groundloop is a comic character conceived by Capt. Austin K. Doyle, USN and Lt. Cdr. Robert Osborn, USNR shortly after the Attack on Pearl Harbor during World War II.

An early aviator, he was used in training manuals, like Taxi Sense, and training posters for the United States Navy. Dilbert was specifically shown doing things that pilots shouldn't do with the terrible and comedic consequences of his actions illustrated for the benefit of future pilots.

The Dilbert training materials received wide recognition by Navy personnel and others, due to Osborn's distinctive linear style.

== In popular culture ==
He is the namesake of the comic strip Dilbert as well as of its titular character. The name was suggested by author Adams' boss at Pacific Bell.
