= Asok (Dilbert) =

Publication information
- Publisher: United Feature Syndicate
- First appearance: March 18, 1996 in Dilbert
- Created by: Scott Adams
- Voiced by: Tom Kenny

In-story information
- Species: Human
- Place of origin: United States

Asok (/ˈɑːʃʊk/ AH-shuuk) is an Indian intern in the Dilbert comic strip. His first appearance was March 18, 1996. He is a brilliant graduate from the Indian Institute of Technology.

The character is named after a friend and co-worker of strip creator Scott Adams at Pacific Bell. "Asok" is a common Indian name, though it is usually spelled "Ashok" and pronounced "Ah-shok". Scott Adams confessed in his book Dilbert 2.0: 20 years of Dilbert that he had a coworker whose name was also Asok, with the same spelling he later used, and that he (Scott Adams) had no idea it could be spelled differently. The name is an English variation of the name of the first major emperor of India, Emperor Ashoka. Asok himself is Indian, but that fact was not mentioned until September 2003, although in the animated series 1999 episode "Holiday", Asok mentions he has family living in India. Adams says in Seven Years of Highly Defective People that this is because "I only like characters who have huge, gaping character flaws. The world is far too sensitive to let me get away with a highly flawed minority member."

Asok appears to be a fan of Indian music: in the animated episode "Art" he is shown listening enthusiastically to a female vocalist singing in Hindi.

Asok has been described as the "first Indian comic character to win hearts globally", with commentators noting that "the stereotype of the cerebral Indian has passed into popular culture".

== Relationship to office politics ==
Asok often solves difficult problems in a few keystrokes, but he is still naïve to the cruelties and politics of the business world. As a result, he often ends up being the scapegoat for his coworkers' antics. Despite many years as an intern, and performing the functions of a senior engineer, Asok has been denied permission to be a regular employee and the usage of company resources for his work, apparently because the Pointy-Haired Boss has approval to hire new senior engineers, but not interns. As he stated "If I promote you, my empire, I mean department, won't grow."

It has been mentioned that Asok once used to work from the handicapped stall of the office bathroom; he was later asked to move to a storage facility (but was only allowed an hour leave for moving by the Pointy-Haired Boss).

In recent times, Wally had become a sort of bizarre mentor to the innocent Asok, and explains his highly cynical world view to the intern. Asok is not really very close to Dilbert, but in the TV series is willing to socialize with him outside of work. Arguably Asok is probably the only character who likes Dilbert as opposed to merely tolerating him.

== Psychic abilities ==
Asok is trained to sleep only on national holidays, a trait that he allegedly carried over from his alma mater.

In addition, he was trained during his time at the Indian Institute of Technology in telekinesis, and despite being told he could not use his powers in front of the ungifted, he has used it for personal gain or for defense on occasion. Once to vaporize an obnoxious Texan and more recently to stealthily steal donuts in a meeting, remove asbestos from the office, and he chokes the Boss by tightening his necktie after the Boss is not happy that Asok invented a superconductor that would eliminate the need for oil, saying that he should have been finding vendors for ink cartridges. After an incident in 2008 where he vaporizes a coworker using the "stink-eye" he was forced to return to the IIT to be punished for his actions.

As well, he has mentioned that he is mentally superior to most people on Earth. One example is his ability to reheat his tea by holding a cup to his forehead and thinking about fire.

The Dilbert TV series offered conflicting views of Asok's athletic abilities. In the episode "The Company Picnic" Asok is shown to be unable to throw a baseball with either hand. In the episode "The Security Guard", Wally calls Asok "a woman", citing the fact he has little upper body strength (it is also mentioned that he once needed assistance to lift a computer monitor). However, Asok is also shown demonstrating impressive athletic feats as well. In the episode "The Shroud of Wally", Asok is able to hurl a briefcase several dozen yards high through the open window of a rocket and sprint away from it in only seconds to escape being engulfed in flames. Asok has also claimed to have killed a coyote with only his keys, although he later concedes that it "might have been a potato".

== Death and reincarnation ==
Scott Adams stated in a late October 2007 interview that one of the regular characters was to die soon. On December 7, 2007 the Pointy-Haired Boss announced that Asok died while on a test of a moon shuttle prototype. (Co-piloted by The Grim Reaper, the only person willing to work for free) Asok had planned to reincarnate into his clone; unfortunately Carol had reused the jar containing his DNA as a candy jar. On Saturday, December 8, Asok was reincarnated into a part human, part Snickers bar - the result of Asok's DNA being mixed in with candy. On Monday, December 10, Asok's clone was informed by Dilbert that Asok had been killed, and that he had been reincarnated into a half man, half snack. Asok used his advanced shape shifting and guided reincarnation skills (learned at the Indian Institute of Technology) to change his form into that of a regular, peanut and chocolate-free, intern. It appears that Asok has been returned to normal as far as the Dilbert strip is concerned. In fact, the January 16, 2008 episode saw Asok tell the Boss that he was going to send his report to the Board of Directors, but the Boss said that he couldn't speak to the Board because he was an intern.

On September 16, 2010, Asok indicated that he had written a book based entirely on the dumb things that the pointy-haired boss has said. Asok claims that this was legal because "under the law" only intellectual property is protected.

On October 29, 2010, the pointy-haired boss promoted Asok from intern to "limbo", the state "between the living and the damned".

== Sexual orientation ==
On February 7, 2014, Dogbert declared that Asok was gay, in protest of an Indian Supreme Court decision upholding a British era law that indulging in homosexual activity is a crime. Dogbert then concluded with, "Okay, we're done here," to which Asok replied, "Good, because I have a lot of gay stuff to do."

Earlier, on September 28, 2013, the marketing department was replaced with an evil genius who proposed using optogenetic technology to neurally rewire customers' preferences. A demonstration intended to make Asok "like gray" instead caused him to "like to be gay."
