= Dilbert's Desktop Games =

1997 video game

- Developer: Cyclops Software
- Publisher: DreamWorks Interactive
- Platform: Windows
- Release: NA: October 1997
- Genres: Puzzle, action
- Mode: Single-player

Dilbert's Desktop Games is a 1997 video game developed by Cyclops Software and published by DreamWorks Interactive for Microsoft Windows. It is a series of ten casual games and activities based on the characters of the Scott Adams comic strip Dilbert, with Adams having contributed to the creative direction of the game. The games, many being imitations of arcade games, feature Dilbert competing with or thwarting his colleagues and bosses in the office. Upon release, Dilbert's Desktop Games received a mixed reception upon release, with some critics praising it as a humorous budget title, and other critiquing its limited content and play value.

== Gameplay ==
The Techno Raiders minigame.

Dilbert's Desktop Games is embedded into the computer desktop. Gameplay consists of a collection of ten games and activities undertaken as Dilbert and supporting characters, with an overarching objective of assembling the pieces of a Game Machine by completing the seven games. Completion of the Game Machine allows players to print a certificate of merit as a "big reward of time well-wasted". Players can also press a button to quickly hide the game and save their progress.

There are seven games, with many imitating arcade games:

1. Boss Evaders is a satire of Space Invaders in which Dilbert runs across the screen, avoiding "pink slips" from his bosses, and firing back with "status reports" from behind shields taking the form of paper trays. Players earn points for targets that Dilbert hits, including 10 for hitting his executive, 20 the vice president, and 30 his boss.
2. Can-O-Matic 2 is a shooter similar to Missile Command, where Catbert can shoot his employees from a giant cannon at randomly-generated targets.
3. CEO Simulator is a business simulation game, where players build a company and its employees, managing employee morale by operating a slot machine. The game features incremental elements, with players monitoring progress that occurs in the background whilst they explore the other games in the software.
4. In Elbonian Airlines, players launch company employees into the air to hit randomly-generated targets using a giant slingshot.
5. Enduring Fools is a whack-a-mole type game that places irritating characters on the player's desktop which can be shot with Dogbert's stun gun, distorting the screen. The game has no win or lose state.
6. In Project Pass-Off, Dilbert and Zimbu compete in air hockey set on a meeting table. As Dilbert, players pass good work projects that fall onto the table into their zone, and pass bad projects onto their opponent.
7. Techno Raiders is a platformer, which requires players to vertically navigate mazelike levels of an office, collecting donuts and gadgets whilst zapping co-workers with his cell phone and avoiding secretaries. Each of the game's 120 levels must be completed to obtain a Game Machine piece.

The game also features three additional activities. The Final Word is a tool allowing players to use rubber stamps with phrases from Dilbert, such as This has long day written all over it, onto their desktop screen. Using The Jargonator, players take text input and exchanges words with corporate jargon: for instance, the phrase the project should be completed soon is converted to the undertaking should be completed real soon [and] analyses of the situation must be transformed into strategy alternatives. Intrusive Mode is a switch which, turned on, plays "irritating sounds and images" on the desktop.

== Development ==
Dilbert's Desktop Games was the first software title developed under the Dilbert license acquired by DreamWorks Interactive, and created by Cyclops Software under its Desktop Toys series of titles. Creator Scott Adams retained creative control over the project, which was developed with Santa Monica development studio Cyclops Software. The game was marketed as a casual game for the work desktop, with DreamWorks executive Jeffrey Katzenberg describing it as a "way to kill a few minutes whenever you're waiting on hold on the telephone".

== Reception ==
Reception

Review scores
Publication	Score
AllGame	4/5
GameSpot	5/10
PC Gamer (US)	24%
APC	3/5

Dilbert's Desktop Games received a mixed reception on release. Some critics found the game amusing as an outlet for time wasting at work, and felt the game was appropriately priced as a budget title. Nick Smith of Allgame wrote that the game was ideal for "quick minutes of occasional fun" as a workplace distraction although "not the kind of gaming experience which you would spend more than an hour at once". Other critics felt the game offered limited value and was a missed opportunity for the use of the Dilbert license. Hugo Foster of Gamespot considered the games "entertaining but lightweight", finding many were derivative of arcade games and their humor fell short of that in the comic strip. Describing Dilbert's Desktop Games as a "lazy cash-in", Gary Whitta of PC Gamer critiqued the lack of complexity, fun, and playtime across the games and activities, writing that "ten uninspired products bundled together just make one bigger uninspired product".

Retrospectively, GameSpot discussed the game as part of a series of satirical office-themed desktop software such as Microshaft Winblows or The Laffer Utilities. Nick Douglas of Lifehacker Australia stated the tone of Dilbert's Desktop Games matched the game's light satirical tone, and considered that CEO Simulator was the software's most effective imitation of office life.

=== Accolades ===
Dilbert's Desktop Games received the award for the Best Home Entertainment Product/Game at the 1999 3rd Golden Satellite Awards held by the International Press Academy.
