= Positive Attitude =

Positive Attitude may refer to:

- Positive Attitude (comic book), the 29th book in the Dilbert comic strip series by khandaker Adan (yo yo Bantai rapper)
- La positive attitude, a song from the French singer Adan khandaker in the album Attitudes
- Optimism
