= Dilbert (TV series) =

American animated sitcom

- Genre: Animated sitcom
- Created by: Scott Adams
- Based on: Dilbert by Scott Adams
- Developed by: Scott Adams; Larry Charles
- Voices of: Daniel Stern; Chris Elliott; Larry Miller; Gordon Hunt; Kathy Griffin; Jackie Hoffman; Jason Alexander; Tom Kenny
- Theme music composer: Danny Elfman (arranged by Steve Bartek)
- Opening theme: "The Dilbert Zone"
- Composers: Adam Cohen; Ian Dye
- Country of origin: United States
- Original language: English
- No. of seasons: 2
- No. of episodes: 30

Production
- Executive producers: Scott Adams; Larry Charles
- Producers: Jeffrey Goldstein; Ron Nelson; Ned Goldreyer; Kara Vallow
- Editor: Mark Scheib
- Running time: 22 minutes
- Production companies: Idbox; United Media; Adelaide Productions; Columbia TriStar Television

Original release
- Network: UPN
- Release: January 25, 1999 – July 25, 2000

Dilbert is an American adult animated sitcom produced by Idbox, United Media, Adelaide Productions and Columbia TriStar Television. The series aired on UPN from January 25, 1999 to July 25, 2000. The series is an adaptation of the comic strip of the same name by Scott Adams, who also served as executive producer and showrunner for the series along with former Seinfeld writer Larry Charles. The first episode was broadcast on January 25, 1999, and was UPN's highest-rated comedy series premiere at that point in the network's history; it lasted two seasons with thirty episodes and won a Primetime Emmy Award for its title sequence. Dilbert received positive critical reviews which praised its humor.

== Synopsis ==
The series follows the adventures of a middle-aged white-collar office worker, named Dilbert, who is extremely intelligent in regards to all things that fall within the boundaries of electrical engineering. Despite his intelligence he is unable to question certain processes that he believes to be inefficient, due to his lack of power within the organization. Thus, he is consistently found to be unsatisfied with the decisions that are made in his workplace, because he has many suggestions to improve the decision, yet is incapable of expressing them. Consequently, he is often found to show a pessimistic and frustrated attitude, which ultimately lands him in various comedic situations that revolve around concepts like leadership, teamwork, communication, and corporate culture.

== History ==
The first season centers on the creation of a new product, the "Gruntmaster 6000". The first three episodes involve the idea process ("The Name", "The Prototype", and "The Competition" respectively); the fourth ("Testing") involves having it survive a malevolent company tester named "Bob Bastard", and the fifth ("Elbonian Trip") is about production in the famine-stricken fourth-world country of Elbonia. The prototype is delivered to an incredibly stupid family in Squiddler's Patch, Texas, during the thirteenth and final episode of the season, "Infomercial", even though it was not tested in a lab beforehand. The family's misuse of the prototype creates a black hole that sucks Dilbert in; he instantly wakes up in the meeting seen at the start of the episode, then locks his design lab to keep the prototype from being shipped out.

The second season features seventeen episodes, bringing the total number of episodes to thirty. Unlike the first season, the episodes are not part of a larger story arc and have a different storyline for each of the episodes (with the exception of episodes 29 and 30, "Pregnancy" and "The Delivery"). Elbonia is revisited once more in "Hunger"; Dogbert still manages to scam people in "Art"; Dilbert is accused of mass murder in "The Trial"; and Wally gets his own disciples (the result of a complicated misunderstanding, the company launching a rocket for NASA, and a brainwashing seminar) in episode 16, "The Shroud of Wally".

The theme music, "The Dilbert Zone", was written by Danny Elfman. It is an abbreviated instrumental rewrite of the theme from the film Forbidden Zone, originally performed by Elfman's band, The Mystic Knights of the Oingo Boingo.

=== Conception ===
Scott Adams, the creator of Dilbert, decided to create the series for UPN because the network promised 13 episodes on air, while other networks would only consider the series against other programming options. Adams added to that "If we had gone with NBC, they would have given Dilbert a love interest with sexual tension." UPN was the sixth-ranked network at the time and picked up the show in hopes of broadening their appeal and to prove they were committed to riskier alternative shows. Adams stated about turning Dilbert into a series "It's a very freeing experience because doing the comic strip limits me to three (picture) panels with four lines or less of dialogue per issue, in the TV series, I have 21 minutes per episode to be funny. I can follow a theme from beginning to end, which will add lots of richness to the characters." Adams wanted the series to be animated because the live action version shot previously for FOX did not translate well. Adams added to that "If Dilbert's going to be at the top of the Alps, you just draw it that way and you don't have to build an Alps scene. You can also violate some laws of physics, and cause and effect. People forgive it very easily. So it's much more freeing creatively."

=== Cancellation ===
On November 22, 2006, when Adams was asked why the show was canceled, he explained:

It was on UPN, a network that few people watch. And because of some management screw-ups between the first and second seasons the time slot kept changing and we lost our viewers. We were also scheduled to follow the worst TV show ever made: Shasta McNasty. On TV, your viewership is 75% determined by how many people watched the show before yours. That killed us.

On June 28, 2020, Adams claimed on Twitter that the show was cancelled because he was white and UPN had decided to focus on an African-American audience, and that he had been discriminated against.

== Cast ==
=== Main ===
- Daniel Stern as Dilbert
- Chris Elliott as Dogbert
- Larry Miller as The Pointy-Haired Boss
- Gordon Hunt as Wally
- Kathy Griffin as Alice
- Jackie Hoffman as Dilmom
- Jim Wise as Loud Howard
- Tom Kenny as Ratbert, Asok, Dilbert's shower, additional voices
- Gary Kroeger as Additional voices
- Maurice LaMarche as The World's Smartest Garbageman, Bob the Dinosaur, additional voices
- Tress MacNeille as Carol, Lena, additional voices
- Jason Alexander as Catbert

Griffin was starring in the NBC series Suddenly Susan during the time that Dilbert was in production. Under the terms of her contract with NBC, she could not receive on-screen credit for any roles in series that aired on other networks.

=== Guest stars ===
- Stone Cold Steve Austin as Himself
- Jennifer Bransford as Ashley
- Andy Dick as Dilbert's Assistant Alfonso
- Jon Favreau as Holden Callfielder
- Gilbert Gottfried as Accounting Troll
- Tom Green as Jerrold
- Christopher Guest as The Dupey
- Buck Henry as Dadbert
- Harry Kalas as Baseball Announcer
- Wayne Knight as Path-E-Tech Security Guard
- Jay Leno as Himself
- Eugene Levy as Comp-U-Comp's Plug Guard
- Camryn Manheim as Juliet
- Mr. Moviefone as Himself
- Chazz Palminteri as Leonardo da Vinci
- Jeri Ryan as Seven of Nine Alarm Clock
- Jerry Seinfeld as Comp-U-Comp
- Billy West as Vibrating Chair Salesman, Rioting Engineer (Pilot episode only)

== Episodes ==
=== Series overview ===
Season	Episodes	Originally released	
Season	Episodes	First released	Last released
1	13	January 25, 1999	May 24, 1999
2	17	November 2, 1999	July 25, 2000

=== Season 1 (1999) ===
No. overall	No. in season	Title	Directed by	Written by	Original release date	Prod. code	Viewers (millions)
1	1	"The Name"	Seth Kearsley	Larry Charles & Scott Adams	January 25, 1999	101	6.79
Dilbert (Daniel Stern) is tasked with naming a product that hasn't even been designed yet, and the stress (brought on by a recurring nightmare) makes Dilbert think he's turning into a chicken.
2	2	"The Prototype"	Alfred Gimeno	Jeff Kahn	February 1, 1999	102	4.73
Dilbert and Alice (Kathy Griffin) must work together to stop a rival team led by the legendary "Lena" (Tress MacNeille) from stealing their ideas and presenting them to the Boss as her own.
3	3	"The Competition"	Seth Kearsley	Ned Goldreyer	February 8, 1999	103	3.69
Dilbert is fired from his job when he is suspected of being a spy for a rival company (which was a rumor cooked up by Dogbert's online newsletter) and gets hired at a company that actually treats their workers like people.
4	4	"Testing"	Chris Dozois	David Silverman & Stephen Sustarsic	February 22, 1999	104	3.13
The Gruntmaster 6000 prototype is put to the test by evil-masked test engineer Bob Bastard (Tom Kenny). Meanwhile, Dogbert (Chris Elliott) goes into space.
5	5	"Elbonian Trip"	Mike Kim	David Silverman & Stephen Sustarsic	March 1, 1999	105	2.97
Dilbert, Alice, Wally (Gordon Hunt), Dogbert, and the Pointy-Haired Boss (Larry Miller) take a business trip to Elbonia. Alice and Dilbert attempt to free the Elbonian people (Alice adopts an Elbonian baby while Dilbert introduces the workers to human rights) while Wally becomes a prophet, and Dogbert becomes a diplomat to Elbonia.
6	6	"The Takeover"	Andi Klein	Larry Charles & Scott Adams and Ned Goldreyer	February 15, 1999	106	3.9
Dilbert and Wally become majority shareholders of their company after Dogbert manipulates the stock market.
7	7	"Little People"	Barry Vodos	David Silverman & Stephen Sustarsic and Scott Adams & Larry Charles	April 5, 1999	107	3.09
Dilbert discovers that the office is inhabited by a race of former employees who have been "downsized" (literally shrunken down to size after they've been laid off) after finding all of his belongings used, the dry-erase markers disappearing, and X-rated websites on his computer.
8	8	"Tower of Babel"	Gloria Jenkins	David Silverman & Stephen Sustarsic	March 22, 1999	108	3.84
The repetitive passing-on of the same cold strain in Dilbert's office causes it to mutate and turns the coworkers into monsters. Rather than eliminate the virus, the company decides to start fresh by moving everyone to a new office, which Dilbert is tasked with designing in exchange for a new office.
9	9	"Y2K"	Jennifer Graves, Bob Hathcock, and Andi Tom	Andrew Borakove, Rachel Powell, and Scott Adams & Larry Charles	May 3, 1999	109	2.78
On the eve of the new millennium, everyone—except Dilbert—is making New Year's plans. While assuring everyone that the company is prepared for Y2K, Dilbert discovers that the computer mainframe's main processor isn't Y2K-compatible and all the company's systems will crash if it isn't fixed. Dilbert is rewarded for discovering this by being assigned to fix it, and he discovers that the system's original programmer was Wally. But have years of drudge work dulled his brain too much to be able to tackle this crucial task?
10	10	"The Knack"	Michael Goguen	Ned Goldreyer and Scott Adams & Larry Charles	April 26, 1999	110	2.68
Dilbert loses "the knack" for technology when he gets management DNA from accidentally drinking from the Boss's cup. His resulting missteps send the world back to the Dark Ages.
11	11	"Charity"	Chris Dozois	Stephen Sustarsic & David Silverman and Scott Adams & Larry Charles	May 10, 1999	111	2.95
Dilbert questions the idea of charity and is forced to be the coordinator for the "Associated Way" charity drive. Later, at the company charity carnival, Dogbert hits children in the face with baseballs.
12	12	"Holiday"	Andi Klein	Ned Goldreyer, Stephen Sustarsic & David Silverman, and Scott Adams & Larry Charles	May 17, 1999	112	2.95
Dilbert thinks there are too many time-wasting holidays; Dogbert concurrently convinces Congress to abandon all holidays in favor of a National Dogbert Day.
13	13	"The Infomercial"	Todd Frederiksen and Joe Vaux	Ned Goldreyer and Scott Adams & Larry Charles	May 24, 1999	113	2.47
The pre-production, non-lab-tested Gruntmaster 6000 is scheduled to be tested by a Texan family whose ill treatment of it threatens to destroy the world. Meanwhile, the Boss begins predicting the future while asleep after injuring his head while making a commercial for the Gruntmaster 6000.

=== Season 2 (1999–2000) ===
No. overall	No. in season	Title	Directed by	Written by	Original release date	Prod. code	Viewers (millions)
14	1	"The Gift"	Gloria Jenkins	Ned Goldreyer	November 2, 1999	201	1.56
Dilbert's mother's birthday is coming up, and in search of the perfect gift, he returns to the mall where he was abandoned by his father (voiced by Buck Henry) years ago. 7 of 9 alarm clock voiced by Jeri Ryan.
15	2	"The Trial"	Chris Dozois	Joe Wiseman & Joe Port	November 23, 1999	202	1.85
Dilbert is arrested and sent to jail after the boss frames him for a fatal traffic accident that kills multiple nobel prize winners. Once inside, he applies his knowledge of mathematics and engineering to prison life and takes over his cell block.
16	3	"The Shroud of Wally"	Andi Klein	Scott Adams	November 9, 1999	203	1.84
Dilbert has a near-death experience at a gas station, and finds that the afterlife is exactly like the office. Meanwhile, a group listening to a multi-level marketing speech become hypnotized, and through a bizarre accident caused by a crashing space shuttle and the birthday kit create a religion based on Wally. Dilbert and Dogbert manage to cover up the crash, while Wally turns away his followers with his odd habits.
17	4	"The Dupey"	Michael Goguen	Larry Charles & Scott Adams	December 7, 1999	204	2.12
Dilbert's attempts to design a Furby-style children's toy go horribly awry when the toys gain sentience and mutate into hideous but benevolent creatures that want independence.
18	5	"Art"	Linda Miller	Ned Goldreyer and Scott Adams & Larry Charles	November 16, 1999	205	1.90
Dilbert is assigned to create a digital work of art. The result, the Blue Duck, ends up appealing to the lowest common denominator of society and destroys the value and popularity of classic artworks.
19	6	"Hunger"	Craig R. Maras	Scott Adams & Larry Charles	February 1, 2000	206	2.07
Dilbert tries to end world hunger by creating a new, safe, artificial food, but it tastes so bad that even people dying of starvation refuse to eat it—until his mother (Jackie Hoffman) gets involved.
20	7	"The Security Guard"	Rick Del Carmen	Scott Adams	January 18, 2000	207	1.53
After a heated debate, Dilbert and the building's security guard (voiced by Wayne Knight) trade jobs to see who can do the other's job better. Dilbert quickly finds himself in over his head when he discovers an illegal casino being run underneath the building.
21	8	"The Merger"	Jim Hull	Story by : David Silverman & Stephen Sustarsic; Teleplay by : Larry Charles & Scott Adams	January 25, 2000	208	2.39
The Boss decides that the company needs to merge with another, and chooses a company of brain-sucking extraterrestrials.
22	9	"The Off-Site Meeting"	Seth Kearsley	Ron Nelson, Mark Steen, and Scott Adams	February 8, 2000	209	1.55
Dilbert's home is chosen as the location for an off-site meeting when a dendrophile sues his company because of their deforestation policies.
23	10	"The Assistant"	Gloria Jenkins and Declan M. Moran	Mark Steen, Ron Nelson, and Larry Charles & Scott Adams	February 15, 2000	210	1.29
To hide that there are engineering jobs elsewhere, Dilbert is unwillingly promoted to management and given an assistant (Andy Dick), sparking a showdown with the other engineers.
24	11	"Company Picnic"	Chris Dozois	David Silverman & Stephen Sustarsic and Scott Adams	July 11, 2000	211	1.21
The annual company picnic comes around and so does the softball game between Marketing and Engineering. This episode is based on Romeo and Juliet.
25	12	"The Virtual Employee"	Perry Zombalas	Ned Goldreyer and Larry Charles & Scott Adams	May 30, 2000	212	1.27
Dilbert and his co-workers find an empty cubicle and start dumping their obsolete computer equipment into it. To keep the marketing department from claiming the cubicle, they hack into the human resources database and create a profile for a fake engineer named Todd. The plan backfires when Todd is named project leader and develops a messianic reputation.
26	13	"The Return"	Mike Kunkel	Ned Goldreyer and Larry Charles & Scott Adams	February 22, 2000	213	1.94
Dilbert tries to buy a computer online but gets the wrong model, leading to an unpleasant surprise when he tries to return it to the company warehouse. Jerry Seinfeld and Eugene Levy guest-star as Comp-U-Comp and the plug guard, respectively; Jon Favreau guest-stars as Holden Callfielder.
27	14	"Ethics"	Michael Goguen	Larry Charles & Scott Adams	July 25, 2000	214	1.50
After the company employees are forced to take ethical-training classes, Dilbert is put in charge of designing a nationwide Internet voting network. His scruples are put to the test when an attractive female representative of a tobacco special-interest group tries to seduce him.
28	15	"The Fact"	Linda Miller	Ron Nelson, Mark Steen, and Larry Charles & Scott Adams	July 18, 2000	215	1.2
Dogbert becomes rich and famous by writing a best-selling book about an imaginary disease, 'Chronic Cubicle Syndrome', and Dilbert finds himself saddled with the job of devising a cure.
29	16	"Pregnancy"	Andi Klein	Larry Charles & Scott Adams	June 6, 2000	216	1.38
Ratbert accidentally sends Dilbert's model rocket into space. When it returns with samples of DNA from aliens, cows, hillbillies, engineers, and robots, it rectally impales Dilbert, impregnating him.
30	17	"The Delivery"	Craig R. Maras	Larry Charles & Scott Adams	June 13, 2000	217	1.74
Dilbert's pregnancy turns into a media circus as the various "parents" of his baby sue for custody, with Steve Austin presiding over the hearing. Austin guest-stars as himself.

== Syndication ==
Dilbert has aired on Fox Kids in different countries, and aired on Comedy Central from 2001 to 2005, and later aired on IFC from 2012 to 2013.

The series is currently available for streaming online on Tubi and The Roku Channel, as well as Amazon Prime Video and the Throwback Toons YouTube channel (managed by Sony Pictures).

== Home media ==
The DVD cover for the complete series

Columbia TriStar Home Entertainment released the complete series on DVD in Region 1 on January 27, 2004. The set included some special features including trailers and clip compilations with commentary by Scott Adams, executive producer Larry Charles, and voice actors Chris Elliott, Larry Miller, Kathy Griffin, and Gordon Hunt. The DVDs can be played on some PCs and DVD players with Region 2.

On November 8, 2013, Mill Creek Entertainment announced that it had acquired the home video rights to the series. They re-released the complete series on January 21, 2014.

== Reception ==
Dilbert was favorably received by television critics. Ray Richmond of Variety liked the show stating "it's surely the wittiest thing the netlet has ever had the good fortune to schedule, and based on the opening two installments, it has the potential to score with the same upscale auds that flocked to "The Simpsons" and transformed Fox from a wannabe to a player a decade ago." David Zurawik of The Baltimore Sun gave the show a positive review stating "sit down tonight in front of the tube with more reasonable expectations, and you will find yourself smiling, if not laughing out loud at least once or twice." Terry Kelleher of People magazine picked Dilbert for "Show of the week" and said the show featured "smart, pointed humor aimed at corporate bureaucracy, mendacity and absurdity." In 2017, James Charisma of Paste magazine ranked the show's opening sequence #13 on a list of The 75 Best TV Title Sequences of All Time.

=== Ratings ===
Dilbert's premiere episode received a 7.3 rating from the nation's biggest 44 markets, the highest of the 1998–1999 season for UPN. Across the whole country, the premiere episode received a 4.2 rating.

=== Awards ===
- Primetime Emmy: Outstanding Main Title Design – 1999

== See also ==
- Dilbert animated web shorts
