= Shark Sense =

US Navy publication

- Date: 1944
- Series: "Sense"
- Publisher: Aviation Training Division Office of the Chief of Naval Operations United States Navy

Creative team
- Artists: Robert C. Osborn

Shark Sense is a U.S. Navy publication written for aviators on how to deal with sharks if they are forced to ditch a plane into the ocean. It was published in 1944 by the Aviation Training Division in the Office of the Chief of Naval operations.

== Content ==
Shark Sense contains instructions for surviving in tropical waters. It discusses the likelihood of a shark attack and notes that science had little information on shark behavior. The manual cautioned aviators not to rely on popular information about sharks .

The manual also mentions that scientists were not sure if shark olfaction was the same as with humans.

== Illustrations ==
Shark Sense was created as a comic book in order to be entertaining while informative. The cover features an aviator scrambling in the water with a small fish nibbling on his toe. A thought bubble shows the aviator thinks a shark is attacking him. He is having trouble keeping his head above water due to panic - staying calm is one of the points in the manual.

Most of the illustrations are humorous, but the manual also contained illustrations of a more instructional nature. The instructional panels informed the aviators of body language when downed in tropical waters.

No artists or authors are explicitly credited within the manual.
