= The Last Time (film) =

- Movie poster
- Directed by: Michael Caleo
- Written by: Michael Caleo
- Produced by: Michael Caleo
- Starring: Michael Keaton; Brendan Fraser; Amber Valletta; Daniel Stern
- Cinematography: Tim Suhrstedt
- Edited by: David Finfer; Thom Noble
- Music by: Randy Edelman
- Production companies: Element Films; Lift Productions; LA Squared
- Distributed by: Destination Films (through Sony Pictures Releasing)
- Release dates: October 5, 2006 (Greece); May 18, 2007 (United States)
- Running time: 96 minutes
- Country: United States
- Language: English

The Last Time is a 2006 American independent black comedy film starring Michael Keaton, Brendan Fraser, Amber Valletta and Daniel Stern. It tells the story of a salesman and a beautiful woman who fall in love with each other and develop a relationship.

== Plot ==
Ted Riker, top salesman in the New York office of business machine company Bineview, is assigned to train callow rookie salesman Jamie Bashant, who just moved to the area with his fiancé Belisa. Jamie struggles greatly and Ted tries to help him improve, to no avail.

Ted is introduced to Belisa, who is impressed by Ted's success and confident manner. They have sex, and do their best to keep this secret from Jamie. Ted and Belisa's relationship becomes a full-blown affair and he confesses that he has a failed love in his past, which affected him very deeply, leading to a career switch from college literature professor to hard-driving star salesman. Belisa does her best to comfort him. Later that night in bed after sex, the two discover a shared interest in Oscar Wilde's novel The Picture of Dorian Gray.

Ted neglects work, causing his sales to drop and putting the company in jeopardy. However, his strengthening relationship with Belisa, who now promises to leave Jamie and marry Ted, is healing his bitterness. Jamie, showing no improvement, is fired just as Belisa breaks their engagement. He becomes suspicious that Belisa is cheating on him and nears a nervous breakdown. A concerned Belisa breaks up with Ted to take care of Jamie, planning their return to Ohio. A devastated Ted returns to work to find his manager desperate for him to make some sales. Belisa confronts Ted outside his office, telling him Jamie went back to Ohio, but she has decided to stay in New York to be with him.

The next day, Ted discovers that due to poor sales, Bineview's stock price tanked and was purchased by a competing firm. His office is being closed with dozens of personnel being fired. Despite this, Ted is happy and goes to Belisa's, which he finds empty except for evidence that Jamie and Belisa were working together to destroy his sales. Jamie and Belisa are seen at a party with the president of the competing firm. The bumbling Jamie is actually a ruthless leader of a team of double agents sent to infiltrate Bineview and target the top salesperson at each office as part of a strategy to weaken the company in preparation for this corporate takeover.

Jamie gloats about how he and Belisa were able to destroy Ted's sales performance. A disgusted Belisa leaves the party and goes to Ted's loft, but he is already gone so she goes to her home. As Ted is shown on the road to an unknown destination, she discovers a personal message from Ted in a volume of Wilde's novel The Picture of Dorian Gray, which he has left behind for her. With the knowledge that Ted knows the truth, Belisa is left broken-hearted. The movie closes with a smiling and contented Ted returning to the job he truly loves, teaching.

== Cast ==
- Michael Keaton as Ted Riker: A New York salesman and former teacher. He falls in love with and starts dating Belisa.
- Brendan Fraser as Jamie Bashant: Belisa's fiancé.
- Amber Valletta as Belisa: Jamie's attractive yet neglected fiancée who falls in love with Ted after they have sex one night. She then decides to be with Ted instead of Jamie when he reveals his true colours.
- Daniel Stern as John Whitman
- Richard Kuhlman as Arthur Crosby
- Alexis Cruz as Alvarez
- Neal McDonough as Hurly
- Michael Lerner as Leguzza
- Billy Slaughter as Intern

== Production ==
The Last Time was filmed in August 2005 in New Orleans, Louisiana, and New York City, New York, on a budget of roughly $4,000,000. The film was released in theaters in May 2007.
