= Taxi Sense =

- Date: January 1944
- Series: “Sense”
- Publisher: Aviation Training Division Office of the Chief of Naval Operations United States Navy

Creative team
- Artists: Robert C. Osborn

"Taxi Sense" was one of the many "Sense" manuals produced by the Aviation Training Division, Office of the Chief of Naval Operations, U.S. Navy for Navy Aviators. This particular manual was published in January 1944. The "Sense" manuals were published by the Aviation Training Division in order to supply the armed forces with readable training manuals. The manuals were meant to highlight common sense topics for Naval aviators. No artists or authors are credited explicitly within the manual. The training manuals were considered to be an inviting way to introduce their audience to the necessary material. The cover of the manual features a navy man holding a naval aircraft with a pilot inside, standing over a bunk. The back of the manual features a navy man with his eyes closed dreaming of a naked woman. His distraction is leading him straight into a running saw.

== Content ==
"Taxi Sense" informs the reader, presumably a Navy taxi signalman, of the importance of their position. With page headings such as, “Taxi signalman are essential- that is, GOOD [emphasis their own] taxi signalman”. Beyond the initial enforcement of the importance of the position the manual gets into the specifics of the job. There are charts of “standard aircraft taxi signals” that guide the reader. Another chart of signals informs the reader on “The proper use of lucite night signaling wands”, which includes graphics for essential motions and in some cases their corresponding day time signals.

"Taxi Sense" also includes several cartoons with jokes for the reader. In one cartoon in the beginning of the manual, the illustrator portrays a man helping a fancily adorned man into a chair and the text reads “Helping an airplane get itself parked is like helping your rich Uncle George to a seat- you are rendering an important service to a valuable object”. This illustration among others helps to note the humorous aspect of the manual. Other illustrations feature a pilot being thrown overboard and a taxi signalman twisting his arms in an odd fashion to the confusion of the pilot, claiming “But I want to be different!”.

== Illustrations ==
Though not credited as an artist, the military manual was illustrated by Robert C. Osborn. Osborn was the creator of Dilbert Groundloop, a comic about an incompetent pilot that was referenced in training posters for the U.S. Navy. Osborn was a Lieutenant Commander during the time that he illustrated the “Sense” manuals. Osborn's illustrations help enforce one of the themes of the manual, the importance of the taxi signalman, with illustrations featuring a pied piper leading a group of planes.
