= Coupe de Ville (film) =

1990 film by Joe Roth

- Theatrical release poster
- Directed by: Joe Roth
- Written by: Mike Binder
- Produced by: Larry Brezner; Paul Schiff
- Starring: Patrick Dempsey; Arye Gross; Daniel Stern; Annabeth Gish; Rita Taggart; Joseph Bologna; Alan Arkin
- Cinematography: Reynaldo Villalobos
- Edited by: Paul Hirsch
- Music by: James Newton Howard
- Production company: Morgan Creek Entertainment
- Distributed by: Universal Pictures
- Release date: March 9, 1990
- Running time: 99 minutes
- Country: United States
- Language: English
- Budget: $8-12 million
- Box office: $6 million

Coupe de Ville is a 1990 American comedy-drama film directed by Joe Roth. It stars Daniel Stern, Arye Gross, and Patrick Dempsey as three very different brothers asked by their father to drive a 1954 Cadillac convertible from Detroit to Miami.

Coupe de Ville was released by Universal Pictures on March 9, 1990. The film received negative reviews from critics and grossed $6 million.

== Plot ==
There are three Libner brothers: Marvin, the oldest, is a sergeant in the U.S. Air Force. Buddy, the middle child, is a timid dreamer. Bobby, the youngest, is a handsome rebel in reform school. As kids, they fought a lot and as adults, they barely speak to each other. In the summer of 1963, their tough and eccentric father, Fred, gives them a task: to bring a 1954 Cadillac Series 62 convertible, bought for their mother, Betty, from Detroit to Miami. As the trip goes on, the three brothers fight and begin to reconnect with each other while dealing with various problems along the way.

== Cast ==
- Patrick Dempsey as Bobby Libner
- Arye Gross as Buddy Libner
- Daniel Stern as Marvin Libner
- Annabeth Gish as Tammy
- Rita Taggart as Betty Libner
- Joseph Bologna as Uncle Phil Libner
- Alan Arkin as Fred Libner
- James Gammon as Doc Sturgeon
- John Considine as Professor Kloppner

== Production ==
Despite the film's title, the 1954 two-door Cadillac Series 62 convertible in the movie is not an early generation Coupe De Ville; in 1954, the Coupe De Ville was a hardtop coupe in the Cadillac Series 62, originally introduced in 1949. The full De Ville series (all hardtops) was introduced in 1959, while the convertible was not introduced until 1964.

A portion of the film was shot in Cape Coral, Florida. When set director Richard Villalobos needed props for the Florida segments, he connected with the CEO of Goodwill Industries of Southwest Florida to acquire props for the film, purchasing $4,000 worth of used items from the local Goodwill store.

== Reception ==
=== Box office ===
The film was a box office failure; in its opening weekend (March 9–11, 1990) it only grossed $66,871. In the end, Coupe de Ville only opened in 170 theaters and made $715,983 in the US and Canada. It grossed $6 million worldwide.

=== Critical response ===
On Rotten Tomatoes the film has an approval rating of 25% based on reviews from 8 critics.

Roger Ebert of the Chicago Sun-Times gave it 1.5 out of 4 and wrote: "There is something deadening about the kind of formula picture where you know with absolute certainty what is going to happen, and how, and why." Owen Gleiberman of Entertainment Weekly gave it grade C−.

== Home media ==
MCA/Universal Home Video released the film on VHS on August 9, 1990, with a Laserdisc release occurring one week later. The film's DVD release from Universal Studios Home Entertainment occurred on November 15, 2011, as part of the Universal Vault Series.
