= Charles Franklin Niles =

American aviator (1888-1916)

- Niles in 1913
- Born: October 6, 1888; Rochester, New York, US
- Died: June 26, 1916 (aged 27); Oshkosh, Wisconsin, US
- Cause of death: Plane crash
- Resting place: Furanceville Cemetery, Wayne County New York state
- Known for: Pioneer aviator
- Spouse: Lucille Goddard

Charles Franklin Niles (1888-1916) was an early aviator educated by Glenn Curtiss in 1913. He was the first pilot to fly around the Statue of Liberty, and served as an aviator in the Mexican Revolution.

He subsequently participated in the 1915 Panama–Pacific International Exposition. In December of 1915, he arrived in Yokohama, Japan for an aerobatic exhibition. Attendees included 100,000 spectators, representatives from the Japanese military such as Nagaoka Gaishi, and Prince Naruhiko Higashikuni.

On June 25, 1916, while flying a loop maneuver in his Moisant monoplane at the Oshkosh, Wisconsin fairgrounds a wing collapsed and he crashed. He died of his injuries the next day. A witness to the crash was cartoonist Robert Osborn.
