= Robert Osborn (satirist) =

American satiric cartoonist

Robert C. Osborn
- Born: Robert Chesley Osborn; October 26, 1904; Oshkosh, Wisconsin, U.S.
- Died: December 20, 1994 (aged 90); Salisbury, Connecticut, U.S.
- Education: Yale University
- Occupation: Cartoonist
- Employer(s): The New Republic, Fortune, Harper's, Life, Look, Esquire, The New York Times, House & Garden, U.S. Navy, Naval Aviation News
- Known for: Osborn on Conflict: 40 Brush Drawings (1984); An Osborn Festival of Phobias (1971); Mankind May Never Make It! (1968); How to Work for Peace (1948); War is No Damn Good! (1946); Dilbert: Just an Accident Looking for a Place to Happen! (1943); How to Shoot Ducks (1939)
- Spouse: Elodie Osborn

Robert Chesley Osborn (October 26, 1904 – December 20, 1994) was an American satiric cartoonist, illustrator and author.

== Pre-World War II career ==
Osborn was born October 26, 1904, in Oshkosh, Wisconsin. He witnessed a fatal aviation crash in June 1916 of Charles Franklin Niles. He entered the University of Wisconsin in 1923, then transferred to Yale in 1923. At Yale, together with Dwight Macdonald, Wilder Hobson, Geoffrey T. Hellman, and Jack Jessup, Osborn helped publish campus humor magazine The Yale Record and was accepted into Yale's Elizabethan Club.

After graduating from Yale in 1928, he studied painting in Rome and Paris, then returned to the U.S. and began teaching art and philosophy at the Hotchkiss School in Lakeville, Conn. He found breaking into the ranks of serious artists difficult, and he soon turned to caricature, sometime after suffering from a perforated ulcer while at his fifth year of teaching at The Hotchkiss School.

Osborn was in Austria in 1938, working as a tutor, when he was taken to a Hitler rally. His reaction to this event prefigured his famous disgust with mindless obedience and obeisance: "I was sickened and convinced that before us was a demon," he wrote. War seemed to him acceptable, "if that was the only way to rid the world of his evil." He attempted to join the Spanish Republicans to fight Franco, and later applied to the Royal Canadian Air Force, being turned down on both occasions because of his chronic duodenal ulcer.

== World War II ==
=== The Dilbert years ===
Dilbert: Don't Kill Your Friends, 1943

Osborn enlisted when World War II began, hoping to become a U.S. Navy pilot. However, the Navy apparently decided that he would be better employed with his hand wrapped around a pen rather than around a joystick: he was soon learning, then applying the art of "speed drawing", under the command of the photographer Edward Steichen in a special information unit in which pilot training manuals such as Shark Sense were produced. Osborn began drawing cartoons of a pilot who was hapless, arrogant, ignorant and perpetually blundering in ways that put himself and his crew at unnecessary risk. The name of this character was Dilbert Groundloop also known as "Dilbert the Pilot" and "Dilbert" was soon to become a slang term used to refer to "sailor who is a foul-up or a screwball." Scott Adams credits Osborn as an indirect source of inspiration for the main character in his own Dilbert cartoons. It is not certain how many drawings Osborn produced for Navy manuals; estimates range from 2,000 to 40,000. Osborn illustrated an estimated 2,000 educational posters for Navy pilots between 1942 and the end of the war, some of which appeared in the New York Times and Life magazine. For a while, "dilbert" became a synonym for "blunder" for Navy pilots. In 1943, Dilbert was played by actor Huntz Hall in a US Navy training film Don't Kill your Friends.

=== Grampaw Pettibone ===
During the Second World War Osborn also drew cartoons of an experienced but somewhat curmudgeonly old Navy pilot, Grampaw Pettibone. Known as the "Sage of Safety", this long-bearded ancient was created in 1943 to educate Navy pilots in safety following a series of avoidable flying mishaps. Osborn illustrated the feature in Naval Aviation News for over 51 years, from 1943 until 1994, when artist Ted Wilbur took over.

== Postwar career ==
After Osborn's stint in the Navy ended in 1946, he wrote a book called War is No Damn Good!, including a nightmarish skull-like depiction of an atomic bomb's mushroom cloud drawn only two weeks after Hiroshima, which prompted critic Steve Heller to call it "the first antiwar book of the nuclear age." The title alluded to cartoonist William Steig's caption, "People are no damn good." Osborn later produced political cartoons, ridiculing Senator Joseph McCarthy, and a number of presidents, from Lyndon Baines Johnson through Ronald Reagan. His cartoons for magazines were frequently published in The New Republic, and also appeared in Fortune, Harper's, Life, Look, Esquire, and House & Garden. He was a political activist for a number of causes, including nuclear disarmament.

== Critical reception ==
According to Osborn's New York Times obituary, over his 50-year career, Osborn's

sardonic and often savage drawings in books and magazines have arrested readers with their images of bloated power, violence and death. At the same time, he could be wittily ironic about society's pretensions, spoofing subjects like psychiatry, suburbanites and social climbing.

Osborn characterized himself as "a drawer" whose figures "seemed to come right out of my subconscious." Garry Trudeau called him "one of the very few masters of illustrative cartooning." Robert Motherwell wrote that his drawings were "so alive that they seemed to writhe on the page with an uninhibited energy .... Osborn's art is a call to responsible action."; Motherwell was among those who compared Osborn's graphic work to that of Daumier, Goya, Saul Steinberg, as well as to the sculpture of Alexander Calder, who was a friend of Osborn's.

Reviewing that show in The New York Times, Times art critic John Russell wrote of Osborn's exhibited Chaplin drawings that

Few people have a nimbler, wittier or more versatile way with pen and pencil than Robert Osborn.

== Later life ==
From 1947 until his death, Osborn lived in Salisbury, Conn. with his wife, Elodie (maiden name Courter), an artist and curator with the Museum of Modern Art. He died of bone cancer, and was survived by two sons, Nic, a naturalist and photographer, and Eliot, a musician and teacher, both of Taconic, Connecticut.

== Books written ==
- How to Shoot Ducks (1939)
- How to Shoot Quail (1939)
- How to Catch Trout (1939)
- How to Ski (1942)
- Aye, Aye, Sir! (1943)
- Dilbert: Just an Accident Looking for a Place to Happen! (1943)
- War is No Damn Good! (1946)
- How to Work for Peace (1948), with Fred Smith
- How to Play Golf (1949)
- Low & Inside (1953)
- How to Shoot Pheasant (1955)
- Osborn on Leisure (1957)
- The Vulgarians (1960)
- Dying to Smoke (1964) with Fred W. Benton, MD
- Mankind May Never Make It! (1968)
- An Osborn Festival of Phobias (1971), with Eve Wengler
- Osborn on Osborn (1982) (autobiography)
- Osborn on Conflict: 40 Brush Drawings (1984) Introduction by Robert Motherwell
- The Best of Gramps (1996) (posthumous), ed. by Association of Naval Aviation

== Books illustrated ==
- If You Want to Build a House, Elizabeth Baur Kassler (Elizabeth B. Mock), Museum of Modern Art, 1946
- Safe for Solo: What Every Young Aviator Should Know, Frederick M. Reeder, Rear Adm USN (Ret.), 1947
- Acres and Pains, S.J. Perelman, 1947
- Snobs: a guidebook to your friends, your enemies, your colleagues and yourself, Russell Lynes, 1950
- Strategy in Poker, Business and War, John McDonald, 1950. (McDonald was the ghostwriter for Alfred P. Sloan's My Years with General Motors. McDonald probably came to Sloan's attention because of this strategy book; see Alfred P. Sloan: Critical Evaluations in Business and Management, John Cunningham Wood, Michael C. Wood, p. 91)
- Is Anybody Listening? How and why U. S. Business Fumbles when it Talks with Human Beings, William H. Whyte, 1952
- The Wonderful World of Books, Alfred Stefferud, 1953
- Trial by Television and Other Encounters, Michael Whitney Straight, 1954
- The Spoor of Spooks, and Other Nonsense, Bergen Evans, 1954
- Architecturally Speaking, Eugene Raskin, 1954
- The Exurbanites, A. C. Spectorsky, 1955
- Women & Children First, Paul Steiner, 1955
- Parkinson's Law, and Other Studies in Administration, C. Northcote Parkinson, 1957
- The Insolent Chariots, John Keats, 1958
- The Decline of the American Male, editors of Look, 1958
- Subverse: Rhymes for Our Times, Marya Mannes (AKA "Sec"), 1959
- Don't Get Perconel with a Chicken, H. Allen Smith, 1959
- The Law and Profits, C. Northcote Parkinson, 1960
- I Met a Man, John Ciardi, 1961
- A Modern Demonology, Frank Getlein, 1961
- Basics: An I-Can-Read Book for Grownups, Eve Merriam, 1962
- The Everlasting Cocktail Party: A Layman's Guide to Culture Climbing, Peter Blake, 1964
- The Song of Paul Bunyan & Tony Beaver, Ennis Rees, 1964
- Great Science Riddles, Rose Wyler, 1965
- Gardens Make Me Laugh, James Rose, 1965
- Computers on Campus: A Report to the President on their Use and Management, John Caffrey, American Council on Education, 1967
- Mrs. Parkinson's Law: And Other Studies in Domestic Science, C. Northcote Parkinson, 1968
- Not So Rich as You Think, George R. Stewart, 1968
- International Conflict for Beginners, Roger Fisher, 1969 (foreword by Edward M. Kennedy)
- Missile Madness, Herbert Scoville, 1970
- The Nixon Watch, John Osborne, 1970

== Exhibitions ==
- Charles Chaplin, 1987

== Archives and collections ==
- Robert Osborn Papers. Yale Collection of American Literature, Beinecke Rare Book and Manuscript Library.
- The Library of Congress
- The Pritzker Military Museum & Library
- The Smithsonian Institution
