= Daniel Stern (actor) =

American actor, artist, director and screenwriter (born 1957)

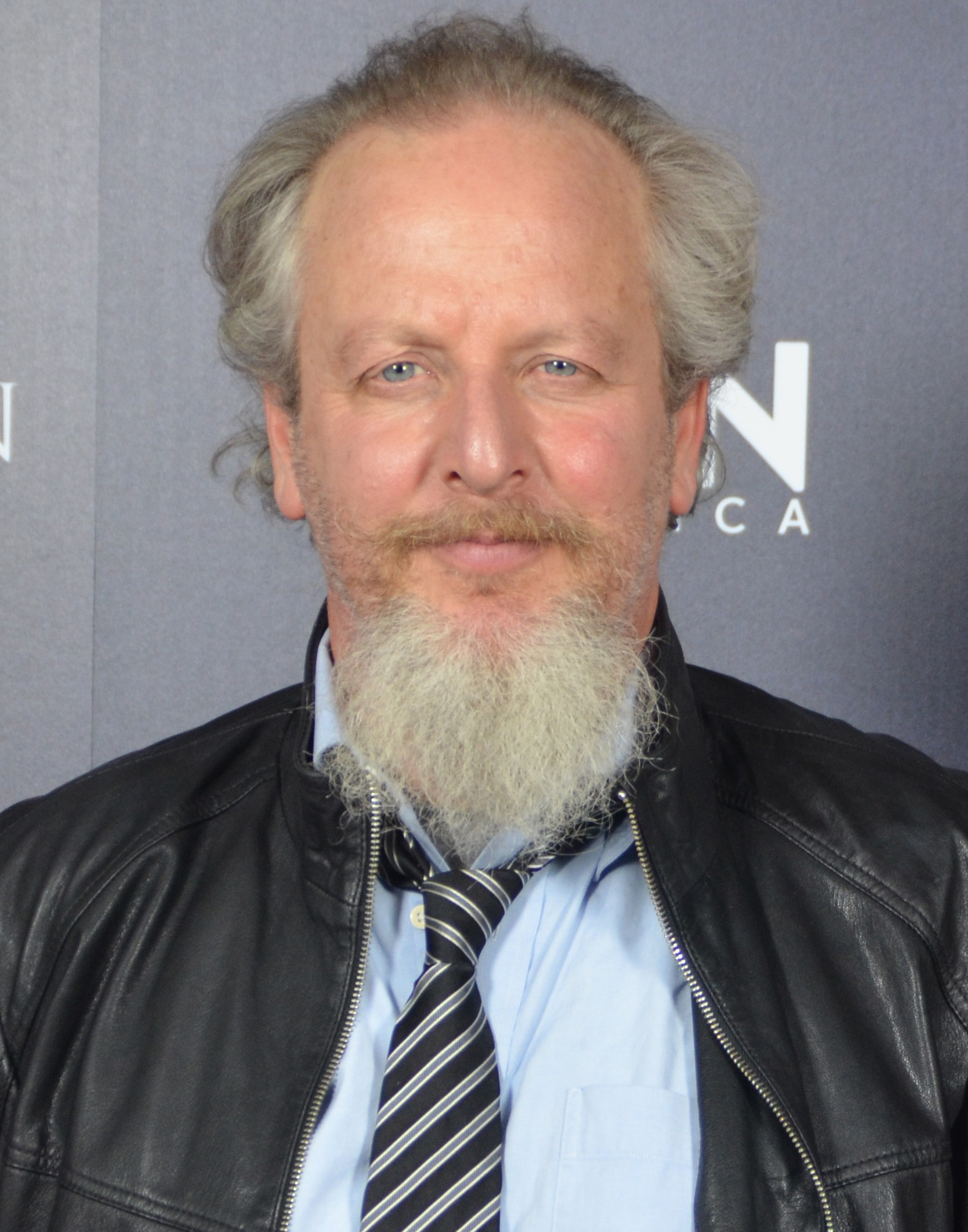
- Stern in 2014
- Born: Daniel Jacob Stern; August 28, 1957 (age 69); Bethesda, Maryland, U.S.
- Other name: Peter Mills (screenwriter name)
- Occupations: Actor; artist; director; screenwriter; cattle and citrus farmer; comedian
- Years active: 1979–present
- Spouse: Laure Mattos (m. 1980)
- Children: 3, including Henry
- Relatives: David M. Stern (brother)

Daniel Jacob Stern (born August 28, 1957) is an American actor, artist, director, comedian, and screenwriter. In film, he starred as Marv in Home Alone (1990) and Home Alone 2: Lost in New York (1992), Phil Berquist in City Slickers (1991) and City Slickers II: The Legend of Curly's Gold (1994). His other films include Breaking Away (1979), Stardust Memories (1980), Diner (1982), Blue Thunder (1983), Hannah and Her Sisters (1986), The Milagro Beanfield War (1988), Coupe de Ville (1990), and Very Bad Things (1998). He made his feature-film directorial debut with Rookie of the Year (1993).

In 2023, Stern joined the cast of the Apple TV sci-fi series For All Mankind in the leading role of Eli Hobson. His other television roles include voicing adult Kevin Arnold on The Wonder Years and Dilbert from the animated series of the same name.

== Early life ==
Daniel Jacob Stern was born on August 28, 1957, in Bethesda, Maryland to Cynthia and Leonard Stern. His father was a social worker while his mother managed a day care center. Stern is Jewish. His brother is television writer David M. Stern. During his years at Bethesda-Chevy Chase High School, Stern starred in several theater productions, including playing Chuck Baxter in Promises, Promises and Tevye in Fiddler on the Roof. He applied for a job as a lighting engineer for a Shakespeare Festival in Washington, D.C., but was hired as a walk-on in their production of The Taming of the Shrew, starring Glenn Close. Stern dropped out of high school in his senior year and soon moved to New York. After taking acting lessons at HB Studio with Austin Pendleton and Herbert Berghof, Stern began his acting career in Off Broadway and Broadway productions, including True West with Gary Sinise and How I Got That Story at Second Stage Theatre with Bob Gunton. Stern acted in numerous productions at The Public Theater, Ensemble Studio Theater, Cherry Lane Theater, and Manhattan Theater Club.

== Career ==
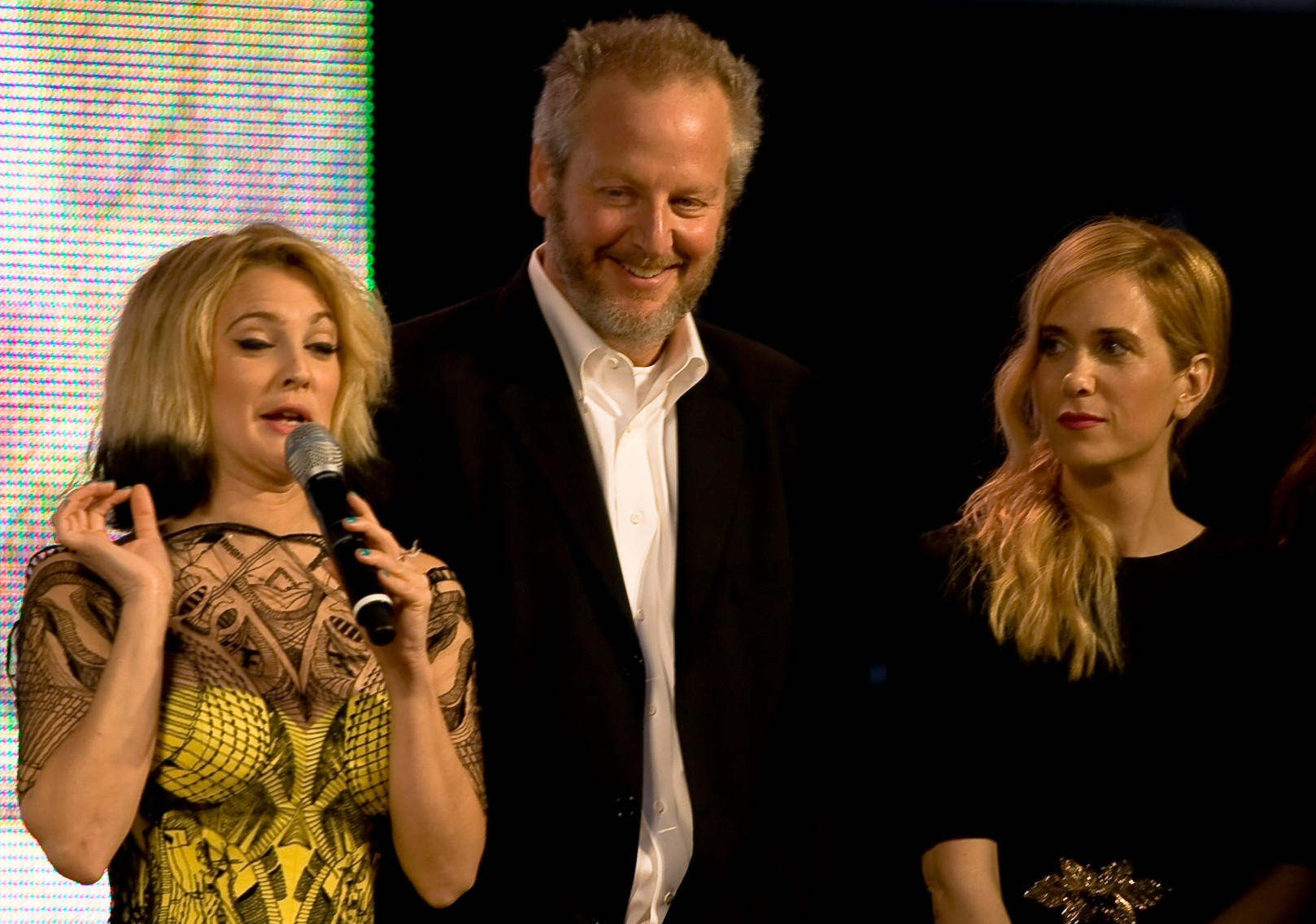
Stern with Kristen Wiig and Drew Barrymore at 2009 Toronto International Film Festival

In 1979, Stern made his film debut as Cyril in Breaking Away. The following year, Stern played a student who raised objections during Jill Clayburgh's proof of the snake lemma in the film It's My Turn. His breakthrough role as Laurence "Shrevie" Schreiber came in Barry Levinson's Diner (1982). He was the novice observer Richard Lymangood in the 1983 action thriller film Blue Thunder. Stern had another early film role in the 1984 horror film C.H.U.D., as the soup kitchen C.H.U.D. hunter. Stern appeared in two films with Woody Allen, Stardust Memories (1980) and Hannah and Her Sisters (1986). His other roles during this time included The Boss' Wife (1986), Born in East L.A. (1987), D.O.A. (1988), Coupe de Ville (1990), and My Blue Heaven (1990). He also appeared as Herbie Platt in Robert Redford's The Milagro Beanfield War (1988).

From 1988 to 1993, Stern provided the voice of the narrator on the television series The Wonder Years, which starred Fred Savage as Kevin Arnold. As narrator, Stern played the adult Kevin Arnold, remembering his youth. Stern and Savage were also featured together in Little Monsters (1989), in which Stern played the father of Savage's character.

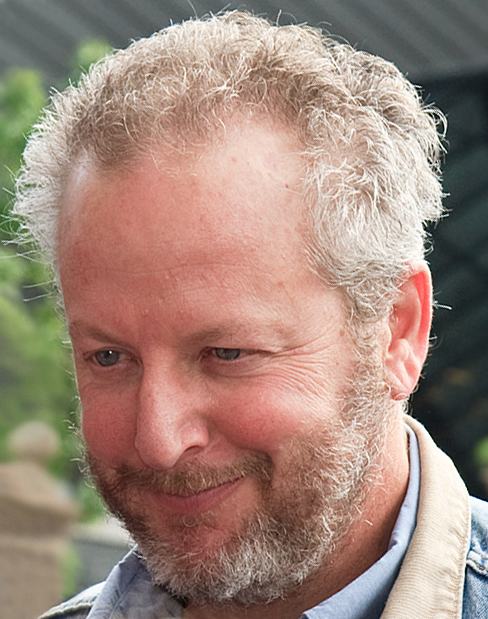
Stern at the 2009 Toronto International Film Festival

Stern has played characters in a number of comedic roles, such as Marv the burglar in the first two Home Alone films, Home Alone (1990) and Home Alone 2: Lost in New York (1992), with Joe Pesci, and Phil Berquist in City Slickers (1991) and City Slickers II: The Legend of Curly's Gold (1994). He also starred as Phil Brickma in Rookie of the Year (1993), Max in Bushwhacked (1995), and Mike in Celtic Pride (1996).

In 1998, Stern took on a more serious role in the black comedy Very Bad Things with Christian Slater, Cameron Diaz, and Jon Favreau. Stern provided the voice for the main character of the Dilbert animated television series, based on the comic strip by Scott Adams.

Stern directed several episodes of The Wonder Years, as well as the film Rookie of the Year, and in recent years directed two episodes of the television series, Manhattan. Stern created, wrote, and starred in the CBS television show Danny.

Stern wrote the off-Broadway hit Barbra's Wedding, which was produced by The Dodgers and Manhattan Theater Club. It starred John Pankow and Julie White, and ran for six months. Stern also appeared in the play at Garry Marshall's Falcon Theater.

Stern was originally offered the role of Dale Gribble in King of the Hill, but he was replaced by Johnny Hardwick when his salary agreement went low. Stern starred in Game Over, Man! (2018) as well as the Hulu original series, Shrill, as the main character’s (Aidy Bryant) father.

== Personal life ==
Stern is a cattle and citrus farmer, and also works as an artist, specializing in bronze sculpture. He has created sculptures for California public art projects in San Diego, Pasadena, Palm Desert, Temple City, Monrovia, and Agoura Hills. Stern is an artist in residence at Studio Channel Islands Art Centre in Camarillo. He has also done many private commissions, gallery exhibitions and art fairs. Stern married actress Laure Mattos in 1980, and they have three children, one of whom is California State Senator Henry Stern.

On December 10, 2025, Stern was involved in an alleged prostitution sting in Ventura County, California, and was issued a misdemeanor citation; he was not arrested or taken into custody. The charge was later dismissed.

== Filmography ==
=== Film ===
| Year | Title | Role | Notes |
|---|---|---|---|
| 1979 | Breaking Away | Cyril | |
| 1979 | Starting Over | Student 2 | |
| 1980 | A Small Circle of Friends | Crazy Kid: Draft Inductee | Credited as "Dan Stern" |
| 1980 | Stardust Memories | Actor | |
| 1980 | One-Trick Pony | Hare Krishna | |
| 1980 | It's My Turn | Cooperman | |
| 1981 | Honky Tonk Freeway | Hitchhiker | |
| 1982 | Diner | Laurence "Shrevie" Schreiber | |
| 1982 | I'm Dancing as Fast as I Can | Jim | |
| 1983 | Blue Thunder | Officer Richard Lymangood | |
| 1983 | Get Crazy | Neil Allen | |
| 1983 | Daniel | Artie Sternlicht | |
| 1984 | C.H.U.D. | A.J "The Reverend" Shepherd | Writer (uncredited) |
| 1984 | Frankenweenie | Ben Frankenstein | Short film |
| 1985 | Key Exchange | Michael Fine | |
| 1986 | Hannah and Her Sisters | "Dusty" | |
| 1986 | The Boss' Wife | Joel Keefer | |
| 1987 | Born in East L.A. | Jimmy | |
| 1988 | The Milagro Beanfield War | Herbie Platt | |
| 1988 | D.O.A. | Hal Petersham | |
| 1989 | Leviathan | Buzz "Sixpack" Parrish | |
| 1989 | Little Monsters | Glen Stevenson | |
| 1989 | Friends, Lovers, & Lunatics | Mat | |
| 1990 | Coupe de Ville | Marvin Libner | |
| 1990 | My Blue Heaven | Will Stubbs | |
| 1990 | Home Alone | Marvin "Marv" Murchins | |
| 1991 | City Slickers | Phil Berquist | |
| 1992 | Home Alone 2: Lost in New York | Marvin "Marv" Murchins | |
| 1993 | Rookie of the Year | Phil Brickma | Director |
| 1994 | City Slickers II: The Legend of Curly's Gold | Phil Berquist | |
| 1995 | Bushwhacked | Max Grabelski | Executive producer |
| 1996 | Celtic Pride | Mike O'Hara | |
| 1998 | Very Bad Things | Adam Berkow | |
| 2000 | How to Kill Your Neighbor's Dog | Guest At Costume Party | Uncredited |
| 2001 | Viva Las Nowhere | Frank Jacobs | |
| 2004 | The Last Full Measure | | Short film |
| 2006 | Bachelor Party Vegas | Hardy Hard | Direct-to-video |
| 2006 | The Last Time | John Whitman | |
| 2008 | Otis | Will Lawson | |
| 2008 | A Previous Engagement | Jack Reynolds | |
| 2009 | Whip It | Earl Cavendar | |
| 2009 | Red State Blues | Howard | Short film |
| 2010 | The Next Three Days | Meyer Fisk | |
| 2010 | Branches | The Narrator (voice) | Short film |
| 2011 | California Romanza | Uncle Pops | Short film |
| 2012 | A Christmas Story 2 | The Old Man | Direct-to-video |
| 2017 | City Slickers in Westworld | Phil Berquist | Video short |
| 2018 | Game Over, Man! | Mitch | |
| 2019 | James vs. His Future Self | Jimmy | Executive producer |
| TBA | Everything's Peachy | Jerry Schiff | Pre-production, director and writer |

=== Television ===
| Year | Title | Role | Notes |
|---|---|---|---|
| 1984 | Samson and Delilah | Micah | Television film |
| 1984 | The Ratings Game | Skip Imperali | Television film |
| 1985 | Hometown | Joey Nathan | 10 episodes |
| 1986 | Comedy Factory | Leon | Episode: "Man About Town" |
| 1988 | Weekend War | Garfield | Television film |
| 1988–1993 | The Wonder Years | Adult Kevin Arnold (voice) | Uncredited; 114 episodes |
| 1990 | The Court-Martial of Jackie Robinson | William Cline | Television film |
| 1991 | The Simpsons | The Narrator | Episode: "Three Men and a Comic Book" |
| 1997 | Gun | Harvey Hochfelder | Episode: "The Shot" |
| 1998 | Hey Arnold! | Mr. Packenham (voice) | Episode: "Tour de Pond/Teachers' Strike" |
| 1998 | Tourist Trap | George W. Piper | Television film |
| 1999 | Partners | Sam | Television film |
| 1999–2000 | Dilbert | Dilbert (voice) | 30 episodes |
| 2001 | Danny | Danny | 9 episodes |
| 2003 | Regular Joe | Joe Binder | 5 episodes; Also; Executive Producer |
| 2009 | Family Guy | The Narrator (voice) | Episode: "FOX-y Lady" |
| 2009 | Monk | Sheriff Franklin | Episode: "Mr. Monk and the UFO" |
| 2010 | Battle of the Bulbs | Bob Wallace | Television film |
| 2013 | Workaholics | Travis Rockne | Episode: "Alice Quits" |
| 2013; 2015 | Getting On | Richard James | 2 episodes |
| 2014 | House of Lies | Robert Tretorn | 2 episodes |
| 2014–2015 | Manhattan | Glen Babbit | 15 episodes |
| 2015 | Strange Calls | Gregor | Television movie |
| 2016 | Angie Tribeca | Dreyfuss | Episode: "The Coast Is Fear" |
| 2017 | Love | Marty Dobbs | Episode: "Marty Dobbs" |
| 2018 | Dan the Weatherman | Don | Television movie |
| 2019 | Shrill | Bill Easton | 8 episodes |
| 2019 | The Movies That Made Us | Himself | Episode: "Home Alone" |
| 2020 | Captain Karl's Institute for the Abnormally Bizarre | Karl "Captain Karl" Moorehouse | |
| 2023–2024 | For All Mankind | Eli Hobson | 10 episodes |

== Awards and nominations ==
| Year | Award | Category | Nominated work | Result |
|---|---|---|---|---|
| 1992 | American Comedy Awards | Funniest Supporting Actor in a Motion Picture | City Slickers | Nominated |

== Memoir ==
- Stern, Daniel (2024). Home and Alone. Simon & Schuster. ISBN 978-1-63228-121-0.
