= The Laffer Utilities =

1991 software program from Sierra On-Line

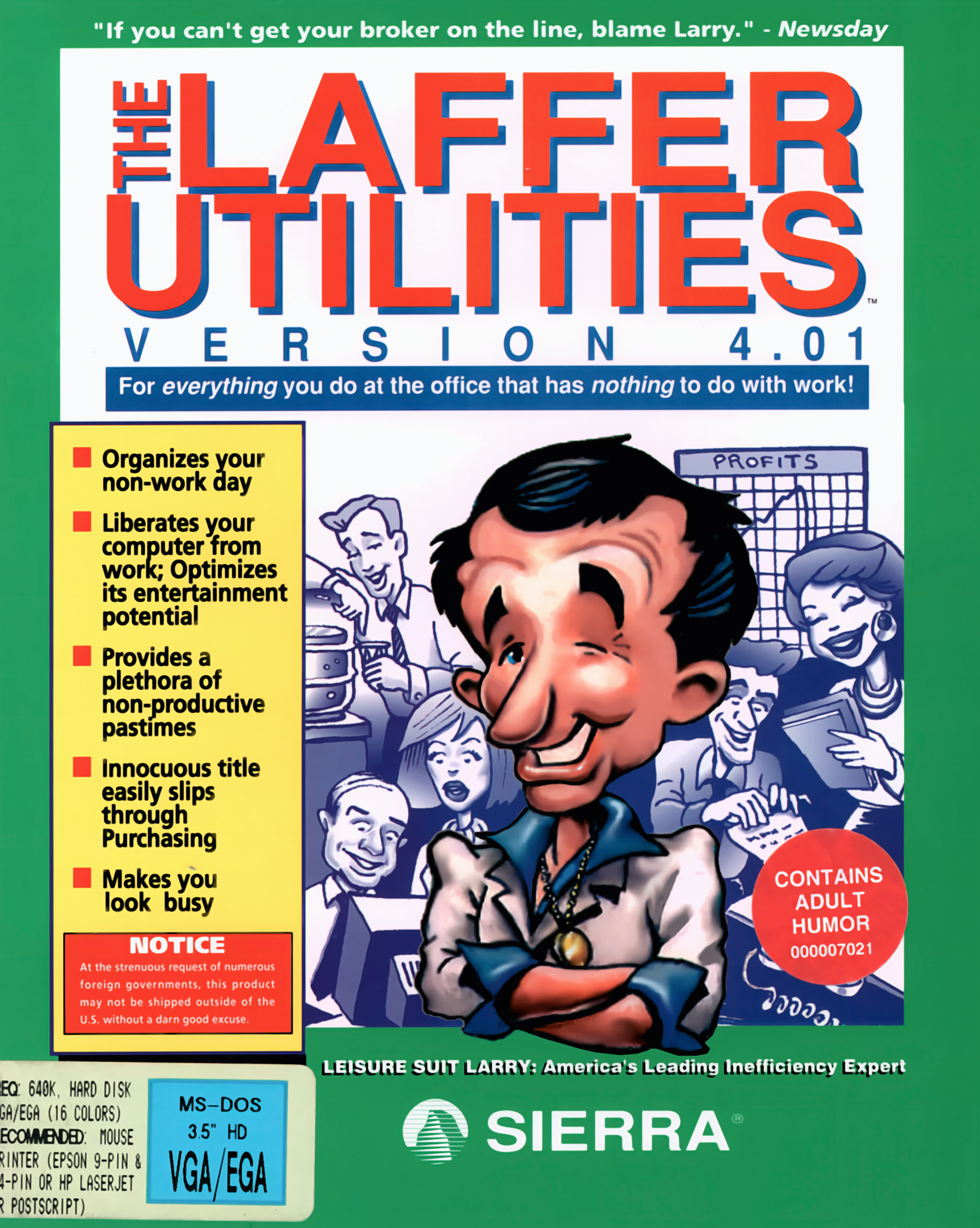
- Box cover
- Publisher: Sierra On-Line
- Designer: Al Lowe
- Platforms: MS-DOS, Windows
- Release: NA: 1991; UK: 1992
- Genre: Utility software

The Laffer Utilities is a "nonproductivity" office software program published by Sierra On-Line in 1991. It was designed by Al Lowe and is a spin-off of the adult-themed Leisure Suit Larry franchise. It parodies the Norton Utilities software suite.

The software was a commercial failure and part of Sierra's attempt to expand a successful adventure game franchise into other software categories, which also included the Crazy Nick's Software Picks compilations.

== Description ==
The Jokes utility, showing the adjustable Filthometer and Laffometer controls

The software is hosted by the Larry Laffer character, and contains 18 utilities:

1. Jokes: A database with adjustable "Filthometer" (content level) and "Laffometer" (humor level) controls
2. Whattodo: A random decision generator
3. Excuses: A random excuse generator
4. Headline: Outputs tabloid-style headlines
5. Sayings: A random "wise saying" generator
6. Horscope: A random horoscope generator
7. WDYWTGFL: Short for "Where Do You Want to Go for Lunch?", a restaurant selector with "Qualometer" (quality) and "Buckometer" (price) controls
8. Sounds: Plays sounds through the computer's internal speaker
9. Pool: Create and maintain office betting pools for various sports
10. Bracket: Outputs tournament brackets
11. Windfall: Random lottery number generator
12. Announce: Screensaver/lock screen that displays text
13. Signs: Creates and prints signs with customizable text and graphics
14. Signups: Outputs lined sign-up sheets
15. Forms: Outputs various office forms
16. Faxcover: Outputs fax cover sheets
17. Phone: Contacts database, which fed names to the other utilities for use in jokes
18. Birthday: Birthday notifier

The program also includes a boss key.

It requires an IBM PC compatible system with 640K RAM, EGA or VGA graphics, and a hard disk with 6.1 MB of disk space.

== Background ==
Creator Al Lowe's inspiration for the program was a TSR that a Sierra colleague had created to display funny sayings from Leisure Suit Larry III programmer Carlos Escobar each time a computer was restarted.

== Release ==
The first version of the software was 4.01, released for MS-DOS in the United States in 1991 during the early 1990s recession, and in the U.K. in 1992. A Windows version was released in spring 1992.

== Reception ==
Computer Gaming World called The Laffer Utilities a "well-planned leap backward for office productivity" and described the utilities as "highly entertaining 'time wasters.'" Writing in Compute!, Ralph Roberts described the software as "the first of a new breed of nonproductivity software" and praised it for bringing "chuckles and stress relief" to offices. Game Player's PC Entertainment characterized it as a "shameless set of time-wasters" with emphasis on having fun, while acknowledging it contained "several useful little programs" alongside the humorous utilities.

The Netherlands' Software Gids praised the software's visuals and utility, giving it scores of 8/10 for both and 9/10 for documentation, but criticized the Dutch pricing of ƒ149 as too high, compared to the U.S. prices ($34.95 for DOS and $39.95 for Windows). The reviewer also criticized a Dutch edition labeled as an "international version" for containing only slightly altered English. PC Joker noted the software's limited graphics and lack of sound beyond internal speaker beeping. PC Format gave the software a score of 38% and criticized it as "incredibly irritating to use" with "pretty lame" jokes and excessive disk accessing times, noting it was not suitable for home use but could be used in an office setting.

The software's packaging promoted its "innocuous title" The Laffer Utilities as one that "easily slips through Purchasing" departments. Creator Al Lowe later acknowledged that the title, although properly spoofing "Norton Utilities," was not recognized by customers as connected to the Leisure Suit Larry franchise because Larry's surname, "Laffer," was not well-known.
