= Dilbert =

American comic strip (1989–2023)

- Author: Scott Adams
- Website: scottadams.locals.com (subscription only)
- Current status/schedule: Ended
- Launch date: April 16, 1989; 37 years ago
- End date: March 26, 2023; 3 years ago (syndicated run; continued as a webcomic)
- Alternate name: Dilbert Reborn (2023–2026)
- Syndicate(s): United Feature Syndicate (United Media, 1989–June 2011) (Universal Uclick/Andrews McMeel Syndication, June 2011–March 2023)
- Publisher(s): Andrews McMeel Publishing (until March 2023); Self-distributed through Locals (2023-2026)
- Genre(s): Satire, observational comedy, surreal comedy

Dilbert is an American comic strip which was written and illustrated by Scott Adams, first published on April 16, 1989. It is known for its satirical office humor about a white-collar, micromanaged office with engineer Dilbert as the title character. It has led to dozens of books, an animated television series, a video game, and hundreds of themed merchandise items. Dilbert Future and The Joy of Work are among the best-selling books in the series. In 1997, Adams received the National Cartoonists Society Reuben Award and the Newspaper Comic Strip Award for his work. Dilbert appears online and as of 2013 was published daily in 2,000 newspapers in 65 countries and 25 languages. The series was dropped by its distributor, Andrews McMeel, in 2023 following accusations of racism against Adams, after which he relaunched the strip as a webcomic, Dilbert Reborn. Adams died in January 2026.

== Publication history ==
"Announcement of changes in company password policy". From left: the Pointy-haired Boss, Dilbert, Alice, and Wally (Pub. September 10, 2005)

Dilbert began syndication by United Feature Syndicate (a division of United Media) in April 1989.

On June 3, 2010, United Media sold its licensing arm, along with the rights to Dilbert, to Iconix Brand Group. This led to Dilbert leaving United Media. In late December 2010, it was announced that Dilbert would move to Universal Uclick (a division of Andrews McMeel Universal, known as Andrews McMeel Syndication) beginning in June 2011, where it remained until 2023.

In September 2022, Lee Enterprises ceased running the strip in what Scott Adams reported as 77 newspapers as the publisher declined to include the strip in a new comics page that was instituted throughout the company. He said that he had received complaints about Dilbert mocking the environmental, social, and corporate governance movement, but that he was not sure if that was the reason for the cancellation. The San Francisco Chronicle, owned by Hearst Media dropped Dilbert in October 2022 saying the move came after strips joked that reparations for slavery could be claimed by underperforming office workers.

In February 2023, hundreds of newspapers owned by media conglomerates including Andrews McMeel Syndication dropped the comic in response to a YouTube video published by Adams on February 22, 2023, during which he advised white people to "get the hell away from black people" following publication of a Rasmussen Reports poll which Adams said showed that African-American people collectively form a "hate group". The poll asked whether respondents agreed with the statement "It's okay to be White", a slogan associated with white supremacy. The poll found that 53% of African Americans agree with the statement "It's okay to be White", while 26% disagreed, and 21% responded they were "not sure". Gannett, including its USA Today network (including the Detroit Free Press, The Indianapolis Star, The Cincinnati Enquirer, and The Arizona Republic) also dropped the strip following Adams's comments. Such major newspapers as The Washington Post, the Los Angeles Times, The Seattle Times, The Atlanta Journal-Constitution, and The Plain Dealer all ceased to syndicate Dilbert and published editorials denouncing Adams. The Los Angeles Times also stated it had removed four Dilbert cartoons from its pages in the preceding nine months when they did not meet the newspaper's standards. In response, Adams announced that on March 16, 2023, he would launch Dilbert Reborn on the subscription website Locals, describing it as "spicier than the original".

Adams died in January 2026 from prostate cancer at the age of 68.

== Themes ==
The comic strip originally revolved around the character Dilbert and his "pet" dog Dogbert in their home. Many early plots revolved around Dilbert's engineer nature, bizarre inventions, and megalomaniacal ambitions. Later, the setting of most of the strips was changed to Dilbert's workplace and the strip began to satirize technology, workplace, and company issues. The strip's popular success is attributable to its workplace setting and themes, which are familiar to a large and appreciative audience. Adams said that switching the setting from Dilbert's home to his office was "when the strip really started to take off". The workplace location is Silicon Valley.

Dilbert portrays corporate culture as a Kafkaesque world of bureaucracy for its own sake, where office politics preclude productivity, employees' skills and efforts are not rewarded, and busy work is praised. Much of the humor involves characters making ridiculous decisions in reaction to mismanagement.

== Characters ==
=== Dilbert ===
The strip's central character, Dilbert is depicted as a technically minded engineer. Until October 2014, he was usually depicted wearing a white dress shirt, black trousers and a red-and-black striped tie that inexplicably curved upward. After October 13, 2014, his standard apparel changed to a red polo shirt with a name badge on a lanyard around his neck. He is a skilled engineer but has poor social and romantic lives.

=== Pointy-Haired Boss (PHB) ===
Dilbert's boss, known only as the Pointy-Haired Boss, is the unnamed, oblivious manager of the engineering division of Dilbert's company. Adams states that he never named him so that people can imagine him to be their boss. In earlier strips he was depicted as a stereotypical late-middle-aged balding middle manager with jowls; it was not until later that he developed his signature pointy hair and the jowls disappeared. He is hopelessly incompetent at management, and he often tries to compensate for his lack of skills with countless group therapy sessions and business strategies that rarely bear fruit. He does not understand technical issues but always tries to disguise this ineptitude, usually by using buzzwords he also does not understand. The Boss treats his employees alternately with enthusiasm or neglect; he often uses them to his own ends regardless of the consequences to them. Adams himself wrote that "he's not sadistic, just uncaring". His level of intelligence varies from near-vegetative to perceptive and clever, depending on the strip's comic needs. His utter lack of business ethics, however, is perfectly consistent. His brother is a demon named "Phil, the Prince of Insufficient Light", and according to Adams, the pointy hair is intended to remind one of devil horns.

=== Wally ===
One of the longest-serving engineers, Wally was originally a worker trying to get fired to obtain a large severance package. He hates work and avoids it whenever he can. He often carries a cup of coffee, calmly sipping from it even in the midst of chaos or office-shaking revelations. Wally is extremely cynical. He is even more socially inept than Dilbert (though far less self-aware of the fact). Like the Pointy-Haired Boss, Wally is utterly lacking in ethics and will take advantage of any situation to maximize his personal gain while doing the least possible amount of honest work. Until the change to "business dorky" wear of a polo shirt, Wally was invariably portrayed wearing a short sleeved dress shirt and tie. Adams has stated that Wally was based on a Pacific Bell coworker of his who was interested in a generous employee buy-out program—for the company's worst employees. This had the effect of causing this man—whom Adams describes as "one of the more brilliant people I've met"—to work hard at being incompetent, rude, and generally poor at his job to qualify for the buy-out program. Adams has said that this inspired the basic laziness and amorality of Wally's character. Despite these personality traits, Wally is accepted as part of Dilbert, Ted, Alice, and Asok's clique. Although his relationship with Alice is often antagonistic and Dilbert occasionally denies being his friend, their actions show at least a certain acceptance of him. For Asok, Wally serves as something of a guru of counterintuitive "wisdom". Wally exasperates Dilbert at times but is also sometimes the only other co-worker who understands Dilbert's frustrations with company idiocy and bureaucracy. While Dilbert rages at the dysfunction of the policies of the company, Wally has learned to use the dysfunction to cloak, even justify, his laziness.

=== Alice ===
One of the more competent and highest paid engineers. She is often frustrated at work because she does not get proper recognition, which she believes is because she is female. She has a quick, often violent temper, sometimes putting her "Fist of Death" to use, even with the Pointy-haired Boss. Alice is based on a woman that Adams worked with named Anita, who is described as sharing Alice's "pink suit, fluffy hair, technical proficiency, coffee obsession, and take-no-crap attitude."

=== Dogbert ===
Dilbert's anthropomorphic pet dog is the smartest dog on Earth. Dogbert is a megalomaniacal intellectual, planning to one day conquer the world. After he takes over the world, he plans to enslave all those not in Dogbert's New Ruling Class (DNRC), his elite group of followers. He actually succeeded in one storyline, but became bored with the ensuing peace, and quit. Often seen in high-ranking consultant or technical support jobs, he constantly abuses his power and fools the management of Dilbert's company, though considering the intelligence of the company's management in general and Dilbert's boss in particular, this is not very hard to do. He also enjoys pulling scams on unsuspecting and usually dull customers to steal their money. Despite Dogbert's cynical exterior, he has been known to pull his master out of some tight jams. Dogbert's nature as a pet was more emphasized during the earlier years of the strip; as the strip progressed, references to his acting like a dog became less common, although he still wags his tail when he perpetrates his scams. When an older Dilbert arrives while time-traveling from the future, he refers to Dogbert as "majesty", indicating that Dogbert will one day indeed rule the world again, and make worshipping him retroactive so he could boss around time travelers.

=== Catbert ===
Catbert is a cat who is the "evil director of human resources" in the Dilbert comic strip. He was supposed to be a one-time character but resonated with readers so well that Adams brought him back as the HR director. Catbert's origins with the company are that he was hired by Dogbert. Dogbert hired him because he wanted an H.R. Director that appeared cute while secretly downsizing employees.

=== Asok ===
A young intern, Asok works very hard but does not always get proper recognition. He is intensely intelligent but naive about corporate life; the shattering of his optimistic illusions becomes frequent comic fodder. He is Indian and graduated from the Indian Institutes of Technology (IIT). The other workers, especially the Boss, often unwittingly trample on his cultural beliefs. On the occasions when Asok mentions this, he is normally ignored. His test scores (a perfect 1600 on the old SAT) and his IQ of 240 show that he is the smartest member of the engineering team. Nonetheless, he is often called upon by the Boss to do odd jobs, and in meetings his ideas are usually left hanging. He is also seen regularly at the lunch table with Wally and Dilbert, experiencing jarring realizations of the nature of corporate life. There are a few jokes about his psychic powers, which he learned at the IIT. Yet despite his intelligence, ethics, and mystical powers, Asok sometimes takes advice from Wally in the arts of laziness, and from Dilbert in surviving the office. As of February 7, 2014, Asok is officially gay, which never affects any storylines but merely commemorates a decision by the Indian Supreme Court to uphold a British-era anti-gay law, a decision which was overturned on September 6, 2018.

=== The CEO ===
The CEO of the company is bald and has an extremely tall, somewhat pointed cranium. He is only slightly less clueless than the Pointy-Haired Boss.

=== Ted ===
An engineer who is often seen hanging out with Wally. He is referenced by name more often in older comics, but he is still seen occasionally. He has been accepted into Dilbert's clique. He has been fired and killed numerous times (for example, being pushed down a flight of stairs and becoming possessed), in which case a new Ted is apparently hired. In addition to this, he is often promoted and given benefits over the other employees. Ted has a wife and children who are referenced multiple times and seen on at least one occasion. Adams refers to him as Ted the Generic Guy, because whenever he needs to fire or kill someone he uses Ted, but slowly over time Ted has become his own character.

=== Tina ===
Also known as Tina the Tech Writer. She has a less forceful personality than Alice and often seems to get taken advantage of by the other employees.

=== Carol ===
Carol is the long-suffering secretary (she prefers the title Executive Assistant) to the Pointy-Haired Boss. Her hair style is a much smaller triangle than that of Alice. She hates her job, but once told Dilbert that spending time with her family of a husband and two children is like fighting porcupines in a salt mine, although when the job gets to be too much she is glad to get back to them.

=== Dave ===
Introduced in 2022, Dave is the strip's first black character, although he identifies as white, messing up the company's ESG and diversity scores, possibly deliberately, as it is not clear whether he is serious or not. Dave has proved controversial, with at least one newspaper chain deciding not to run the strips featuring him.

=== The Elbonians ===
Elbonia is a fictional non-specific under-developed country used when Adams wants "to involve a foreign country without hurting overseas sales". He says "People think I have some specific country in mind when I write about Elbonia, but I don't. It represents the view that Americans have of any country that doesn't have cable television—we think they all wear fur hats and wallow around waist-deep in mud". (Note: However, in a storyline from November 21–26, 2016, Dilbert visits Elbonia. The only location seen is his hotel room and a car rental, neither of which are covered in mud."Dilbert.com 2016-11-23".) The entire country wears the same clothing and hats, and all men and women have full beards. They are occasionally bitter towards their wealthier western neighbors, but are quite happy to trade with them. The whole country is covered in mud, and has limited technology.

Elbonia is located somewhere in the former Eastern Bloc: a strip dated April 2, 1990, refers to the "Tiny East European country of Elbonia." It is an extremely poor, fourth-world country that "has abandoned Communism". The national bird of Elbonia is the Frisbee.

=== Phil ===
The Pointy-Haired Boss's brother Phil. His full title is Phil, the Prince of Insufficient Light & Supreme Ruler of Heck. His job, one step down from Satan, is to punish those who commit minor sins. His 'Pitch-Spoon' is feared by those who do. He is known to 'Darn to Heck' people who do things like using cell phones in the bathroom, steal office supplies, or those who simply do something annoying. In one strip, it was mentioned that being in Heck is not as bad as being in a cubicle.

=== Ratbert ===
Ratbert is an escaped lab rat who lives in Dilbert's house. Ratbert was not originally intended to be a regular, instead being part of a series of strips featuring a lab scientist's cruel experiments. The character is often seen in strips set in Dilbert's home and is frequently a foil / co-conspirator in Dogbert's machinations.

== Legacy ==
The popularity of the comic strip within the corporate sector led to the Dilbert character being used in many business magazines and publications, including several appearances on the cover of Fortune Magazine. Many newspapers ran the comic in their business section rather than in the regular comics section—similar to the way that Doonesbury is often featured in the editorial section, due to its pointed commentary. The Dilberito, a vegetarian microwave burrito, was sold by Adams around the early 2000s.

=== Criticism and parody ===
Media analyst Norman Solomon and cartoonist Tom Tomorrow said Adams' caricatures of corporate culture seem to project empathy for white-collar workers, but the satire ultimately plays into the hands of upper corporate management itself. Solomon describes the characters of Dilbert as dysfunctional, none of whom occupies a position higher than middle management, and whose inefficiencies detract from general corporate values such as productivity and growth. Dilbert and his coworkers often find themselves baffled or victimized by the whims of managerial behavior, but they never seem to question it openly. Solomon cites the Xerox corporation's use of Dilbert strips and characters in internally distributed pamphlets:

Xerox management had recognized what more gullible Dilbert readers did not: Dilbert is an offbeat sugary substance that helps the corporate medicine go down. The Dilbert phenomenon accepts—and perversely eggs on—many negative aspects of corporate existence as unchangeable facets of human nature... As Xerox managers grasped, Dilbert speaks to some very real work experiences while simultaneously eroding inclinations to fight for better working conditions.

Adams responded in the February 2, 1998, strip and in his book The Joy of Work with a sarcastic reiteration.

In 1997, Tom Vanderbilt wrote in a similar vein in The Baffler magazine:

Labor unions haven't adopted Dilbert characters as insignia. But corporations in droves have rushed to link themselves with Dilbert. Why? Dilbert mirrors the mass media's crocodile tears for working people—and echoes the ambient noises from Wall Street.

In 1998, Bill Griffith, creator of Zippy the Pinhead, chided Dilbert for crude drawings and simplistic humor. He wrote,

Long since psychically kidnapped by the gaudy, mindlessly hyperactive world of television, (readers) no longer demand or expect comic strips to be compelling, challenging, or even interesting. Enter Cathy. And Dilbert. Sure, comics are still funny. It's just that the humor has almost no "nutritional" value. In the tiny space allotted to them, daily strips have all too successfully adapted to their new environment. In this Darwinian set-up, what thrives are simply drawn panels, minimal dialogue, and a lot of head-and-shoulder shots. Anything more complicated is deemed "too hard to read". A full, rich drawing style is a drawback. Simplicity, even crudity, rules.

Adams responded by creating two comic strips called Pippy the Ziphead, in which Dogbert creates a comic by "cramming as much artwork in [it] as possible so no one will notice there's only one joke", and it is "on the reader". Dilbert says that the strip is "nothing but a clown with a small head who says random things", and Dogbert responds that he is "maintaining [his] artistic integrity by creating a comic that no one will enjoy." In September of the same year, Griffith mocked Adams' Pippy the Ziphead with a strip of the same name drawn in a simplistic, stiff, Dilbert-like style, set in an office setting and featuring the characters Griffy and Zippy retorting, respectively, "I sense a joke was delivered", "Yes. It was. My one joke. Ha."

=== Language ===
Adams invited readers to invent words that have become popular among fans in describing their own office environments, such as induhvidual. This term is based on the American English slang expression "duh!" The conscious misspelling of individual as induhvidual is a pejorative term for people who are not in Dogbert's New Ruling Class (DNRC). Its coining is explained in Dilbert Newsletter #6. The strip has also popularized the usage of the terms cow-orker and PHB.

=== Management ===
In 1997, Adams masqueraded as a management consultant to Logitech executives (as Ray Mebert), with the cooperation of the company's vice-chairman. He acted in much the way that he portrays management consultants in the comic strip, with an arrogant manner and bizarre suggestions, such as comparing mission statements to broccoli soup. He convinced the executives to change their existing mission statement for their New Ventures Group from "provide Logitech with profitable growth and related new business areas" to "scout profitable growth opportunities in relationships, both internally and externally, in emerging, mission-inclusive markets, and explore new paradigms and then filter and communicate and evangelize the findings".

Adams worked with companies to develop "dream" products for Dilbert and company. In 2001, he collaborated with design company IDEO to come up with the "perfect cubicle", since many of the Dilbert strips make fun of the standard cubicle desk and the environment that it creates.

This project was followed in 2004 with designs for Dilbert's Ultimate House (abbreviated as DUH). An energy-efficient building was the result, designed to prevent many of the little problems that seem to creep into a normal building. For instance, to save time spent buying and decorating a Christmas tree every year, the house has a large (yet unapparent) closet adjacent to the living room where the tree can be stored from year to year.

=== Webcomics ===
In 1995, Dilbert was the first syndicated comic strip to be published for free on the Internet. Putting his email address in each Dilbert strip, Adams created a "direct channel to [his] customers", allowing him to modify the strip based on their feedback. Joe Zabel stated that Dilbert had a large influence on many of the webcomics that followed it, establishing the "nerdcore" genre as it found its audience.

In April 2008, United Media instituted an interactive feature on Dilbert.com, allowing fans to write speech bubbles. Adams has spoken positively about the change, saying, "This makes cartooning a competitive sport."

== Awards ==
Adams was named best international comic strip artist of 1995 in the Adamson Awards given by the Swedish Academy of Comic Art.

Dilbert won the National Cartoonists Society's Reuben Award in 1997, and was also named the best syndicated strip of 1997 in the Harvey Awards. In 1998, Dilbert won the Max & Moritz Prize as best international comic strip.

== Media ==
=== Comic strip compilations ===
==== Chronological ====
Title	Strips collected	Date published	Pages	ISBN	Notes
Always Postpone Meetings with Time-Wasting Morons	April 16, 1989 – October 21, 1989	October 1992	112	978-0886876883	
Shave the Whales	October 22, 1989 – August 4, 1990	April 1994	128	978-0836217407	
Bring Me the Head of Willy the Mailboy!	August 5, 1990 – May 18, 1991	March 1995	128	978-0836217797	The strip dated March 31, 1991, was not included.
It's Obvious You Won't Survive by Your Wits Alone	May 19, 1991 – December 13, 1992	August 1995	224	978-0836204155	
Still Pumped from Using the Mouse	December 14, 1992 – September 27, 1993	March 1996	128	978-0836210262	
Fugitive From the Cubicle Police	September 28, 1993 – February 4, 1995	September 1996	224	978-0836221190	
Casual Day Has Gone Too Far	February 5, 1995 – November 19, 1995	March 1997	128	978-0836228991	
I'm Not Anti-Business, I'm Anti-Idiot	November 20, 1995 – August 31, 1996	March 1998	128	978-0836251821	
Journey to Cubeville	September 1, 1996 – January 4, 1998	August 1998	224	978-0836267457	
Don't Step in the Leadership	January 12, 1998 – October 18, 1998	March 1999	128	978-0836278446	
Random Acts of Management	October 19, 1998 – July 25, 1999	March 2000	128	978-0740704536	
Excuse Me While I Wag	July 26, 1999 – April 30, 2000	April 2001	128	978-0740713903	
When Did Ignorance Become a Point of View?	May 1, 2000 – February 4, 2001	September 2001	128	978-0740718397	
Another Day in Cubicle Paradise	February 5, 2001 – November 11, 2001	March 2002	128	978-0740721946	
When Body Language Goes Bad	November 12, 2001 – August 18, 2002	March 2003	128	978-0740732980	
Words You Don't Want to Hear During Your Annual Performance Review	August 19, 2002 – May 25, 2003	October 2003	128	978-0740738050	
Don't Stand Where the Comet is Assumed to Strike Oil	May 26, 2003 – February 29, 2004	May 2004	128	978-0740745393	
The Fluorescent Light Glistens Off Your Head	March 1, 2004 – December 5, 2004	May 2005	128	978-0740751134	
Thriving on Vague Objectives	December 6, 2004 – September 11, 2005	November 2005	128	978-0740755330	
Try Rebooting Yourself	September 12, 2005 – June 18, 2006	October 2006	128	978-0740761904	
Positive Attitude	June 19, 2006 – March 25, 2007	July 2007	128	978-0740763793	
This is the Part Where You Pretend to Add Value	March 26, 2007 – January 5, 2008	May 2008	128	978-0740772276	
Freedom's Just Another Word for People Finding Out You're Useless	January 6, 2008 – October 12, 2008	April 2009	128	978-0740778155	
14 Years of Loyal Service in a Fabric-Covered Box	October 13, 2008 – July 25, 2009	October 2009	128	978-0740773655	
I'm Tempted to Stop Acting Randomly	July 26, 2009 – May 2, 2010	December 2010	128	978-0740778063	
How's That Underling Thing Working Out for You?	May 3, 2010 – February 12, 2011	November 2011	128	978-1449408190	
Teamwork Means You Can't Pick the Side that's Right	February 13, 2011 – November 20, 2011	April 2012	128	978-1449410186	
Your New Job Title Is "Accomplice"	November 21, 2011 – August 26, 2012	May 2013	128	978-1449427757	Strips from August 27, 2012, to October 7, 2012, were not collected.
I Sense a Coldness to Your Mentoring	October 8, 2012 – July 14, 2013	October 2013	128	978-1449429386	Strips from August 27, 2012, to October 7, 2012, were not collected.
Go Add Value Someplace Else	July 15, 2013 – July 20, 2014	October 2014	168	978-1449446604	
Optimism Sounds Exhausting	July 21, 2014 – August 1, 2015	November 2015	168	978-1449463007	
I'm No Scientist, But I Think Feng Shui Is Part of the Answer	August 2, 2015 – July 23, 2016	November 2016	208	978-1449471965	
Dilbert Gets Re-accommodated	July 24, 2016 – June 10, 2017	November 2017	144	978-1449484392	
Cubicles That Make You Envy the Dead	June 11, 2017 – April 29, 2018	November 2018	144	978-1449493783	
Dilbert Turns 30	April 30, 2018 – February 24, 2019	October 2019	159	978-1524851828	Features the top 50 Dilbert comics of the last decade.
Eagerly Awaiting Your Irrational Response	February 25, 2019 – January 12, 2020	October 2020	144	978-1524860714	
The Office Is a Beautiful Place When Everyone Else Works from Home	January 13, 2020 – November 29, 2020	December 2021	144	978-1524868963	
Not Remotely Working	November 30, 2020 – October 17, 2021	December 2022	144	978-1524875633	The October 18, 2021 through March 12, 2023 strips will not be published in collection by Andrews McMeel.

==== Special ====
Title	Date published	Pages	ISBN	Notes
Build a Better Life by Stealing Office Supplies: Dogbert's Big Book of Business	November 1991	112	978-0886876371	
Dogbert's Clues for the Clueless	August 1993	112	978-0836217377	
Seven Years of Highly Defective People	August 1997	256	978-0836236682	strips from 1989 to 1995 with handwritten notes by Adams
Dilbert Gives You the Business	August 1999	224	978-0740700033	collection of favorites before 1999
A Treasury of Sunday Strips: Version 00	August 2000	224	978-0740705311	color version of all Sunday strips from 1995 to 1999
What Do You Call a Sociopath in a Cubicle? Answer: A Coworker	August 2002	224	978-0740726637	compilation of strips featuring Dilbert's coworkers
It's Not Funny If I Have to Explain It	October 2004	240	978-0740746581	strips from 1997 to 2004 with more of Adams's handwritten notes
What Would Wally Do?	June 2006	224	978-0740757693	strips focused on Wally
Cubes and Punishment	November 2007	224	978-0740768378	collection of comic strips on workplace cruelty
Problem Identified: And You're Probably Not Part of the Solution	July 2010	224	978-0740785344	
Your Accomplishments Are Suspiciously Hard to Verify	August 2011	208	978-1449401023	
I Can't Remember If We're Cheap or Smart	October 2012	208	978-1449423094	

=== Business books ===
- The Dilbert Principle
- Dogbert's Top Secret Management Handbook
- The Dilbert Future
- The Joy of Work
- Dilbert and the Way of the Weasel
- Slapped Together: The Dilbert Business Anthology (The Dilbert Principle, The Dilbert Future, and The Joy of Work, published together in one book)

=== Other books ===
- Telling It Like It Isn't — 1996; ISBN 0-8362-1324-6
- You Don't Need Experience If You've Got Attitude — 1996; ISBN 0-8362-2196-6
- Access Denied: Dilbert's Quest for Love in the Nineties — 1996; ISBN 0-8362-2191-5
- Conversations With Dogbert — 1996; ISBN 0-8362-2197-4
- Work is a Contact Sport — 1997; ISBN 0-8362-2878-2
- The Boss: Nameless, Blameless and Shameless — 1997; ISBN 0-8362-3223-2
- The Dilbert Bunch — 1997; ISBN 0-8362-2879-0
- No You'd Better Watch Out — 1997
- Please Don't Feed The Egos — 1997; ISBN 0-8362-3224-0
- Random Acts of Catness — 1998; ISBN 0-8362-5277-2
- You Can't Schedule Stupidity — 1998; ISBN 0-8362-5632-8
- Dilbert Meeting Book Exceeding Tech Limits — 1998; ISBN 0-7683-2028-3
- Trapped In A Dilbert World – Book Of Days — 1998; ISBN 0-7683-2030-5
- Work—The Wally Way — 1999; ISBN 0-8362-7480-6
- Alice in Blunderland — 1999; ISBN 0-8362-7479-2
- All Dressed Down And Nowhere To Go — 2002; ISBN 0-7407-2931-4
- Dilbert's Guide to the Rest of Your Life: Dispatches from Cubicleland — 2007; ISBN 0-7624-2781-7
- Dilbert Sudoku Comic Digest: 200 Puzzles Plus 50 Classic Dilbert Cartoons — 2008; ISBN 0-7407-7250-3
- Dilbert 2.0: 20 Years of Dilbert — 2008; 576 pages, ≈6500 strips, and Adams's notes from 1989 to 2008.

=== Merchandise ===
- Corporate Shuffle by Richard Garfield — 1997; A Dilbert-branded card game similar to Wizards of the Coast's The Great Dalmuti and the drinking game President.
- The Dilberito, a vegan microwave burrito offered in four flavors: Barbecue with barbecue sauce, Garlic & Herb with sauce, Indian with mango chutney, and Mexican with salsa.
- Totally Nuts — 1998; A limited edition Ben & Jerry's ice cream flavor whose description was listed as: "Butter almond ice cream with roasted hazelnuts, praline pecans & white fudge coated almonds".
- A line of Dilbert mints that possessed the names Accomplish-mints, Appease-mints, Appoint-mints, Empower-mints, Harass-mints, Improve-mints, Invest-mints, Manage-mints, Pay-mints, Perform-mints, and Postpone-mints.
- Dilbert: the Board Game — 2006; by Hyperion Games; A Dilbert-branded board game that was named one of Games magazine's Top 100 Games
- Day-by-Day calendars featuring the comic strip are available every year.
- Dilbert: Escape From Cubeville — 2010; A Dilbert-branded board game released in the Dilbert store section of dilbert.com.

=== Unaired pilot ===
In 1997, a live-action pilot written and directed by Adams for Dilbert was produced for UPN but never aired. The pilot featured an actor who played Dilbert whom Adams described as "fit for a starring role in a romantic film" as well as an animatronic Dogbert. While the pilot was never released, the Library of Congress holds a copy.

=== Animated series ===
Dilbert was adapted into a UPN animated television series starring Daniel Stern as Dilbert, Chris Elliott as Dogbert, and Kathy Griffin as Alice. The series ran for two seasons from January 25, 1999, to July 25, 2000. The first season centered around the creation of a new product called the "Gruntmaster 6000". It was critically acclaimed and won an Emmy Award, leading to its renewal for a second season. The second season did away with the serial format and was composed entirely of standalone episodes, many of which shifted focus away from the workplace and involved absurdist plots such as Wally being mistaken for a religious leader ("The Shroud of Wally") and Dilbert being accused of mass murder ("The Trial"). The second season's two-episode finale included Dilbert getting pregnant with the child of a cow, a hillbilly, robot DNA, "several dozen engineers", an elderly billionaire, and an alien, eventually ending up in a custody battle with Stone Cold Steve Austin as the Judge.

When UPN declined to renew the series for its third season, Adams stated, "I lost my TV show for being white when UPN decided it would focus on an African-American audience." Adams wrote on Twitter in 2020. "That was the third job I lost for being white. The other two in corporate America." The four-disc DVD called Dilbert: The Complete Series was released and contains thirty episodes. The first disc contains episodes 1–7, the second disc contains episodes 8–13, the third disc contains episodes 14–21, and the fourth disc contains episodes 22–30.

=== Animated web shorts ===
On April 7, 2008, dilbert.com presented its first Dilbert animation. The new Dilbert animations are animated versions of original comic strips produced by RingTales and animated by Powerhouse Animation Studios. The animation videos run for around 30 seconds each and are added every weekday. The comic shorts have a different voice cast than the television series, with Washington-based radio personality Dan Roberts providing the voice of the title character. On December 10, 2009, the RingTales produced animations were made available as a calendar application for mobile devices.

=== Cancelled film adaptation ===
As early as 2006, Adams and United Media had been struggling to get a film adaptation of the comic strip off the ground. Adams envisioned the idea as a live-action film, with Dogbert and Catbert as animated characters. Film director Chris Columbus was in talks to direct the film in 2007, with Tariq Jalil on board as producer.

In May 2010, it was announced that a live-action Dilbert film was in development. Ken Kwapis was announced as director, fresh off the heels of He's Just Not That Into You and directing several episodes for NBC's The Office. Jahil remained as producer, with Phoenix Entertainment and Intrigue Entertainment joining the producing team.

But in December 2017, in an interview by The Mercury News, Adams said that it would be impossible to make the film after his public support of Donald Trump.

=== Video games ===
- Dilbert's Desktop Games — 1997; a video game designed for the PC.
- Young Dilbert in Hi-Tech Hijinks — 1997; A Dilbert-branded computer game aimed at teaching young children about technology.
- Dilberito — 2000; a Flash game.

=== Plop: the Hairless Elbonian ===
Plop: The Hairless Elbonian was an experimental spinoff of Dilbert, made by Scott Adams. The strip followed the life of the self-titled character who is unusual in his country for his baldness. Twenty-eight comics were published online in 2001, but the series never saw full publication. In December 2001, Adams suggested that he was still working on the project, retooling elements based on reader feedback.

The strip's installments were produced in the summer of 2001; following that, Adams was uncertain about making a comic about "people who look like the Taliban" in the wake of 9/11, so the project was shelved "probably permanently" according to Adams. Later, he mentioned that, due to receiving fewer complaints about the designs than he had expected, the series may still see the light of day.

Plop was so named because, according to Adams, that was "the first thing my mom heard when I was born three months prematurely." From strip #21, Plop starts to rename himself "Squat", after his name certificate misspells "Scott". According to the Dilbert newsletter, the behind-the-scenes reason for this name change was that Plop had been the name of Plop!, a comic book produced by DC Comics during the 1970s.

== "Drunken lemurs" case ==
In October 2007, the Catfish Bend Casino in Burlington, Iowa notified its staff that the casino would soon be closing for business. David Steward, an employee of seven years, then posted on an office bulletin board the Dilbert strip of October 26, 2007, that compared management decisions to those of "drunken lemurs". The casino called this "very offensive"; they identified him from a surveillance tape, fired him, and tried to prevent him from receiving unemployment benefits. However, an administrative law judge ruled in December 2007 that he would receive benefits, as his action was deemed as justified protest and not intentional misbehavior. Adams stated that it might be the first confirmed case of an employee being fired for posting a Dilbert cartoon. On February 20, 2008, the first of a series of Dilbert strips showed Wally being caught posting a comic strip that "compares managers to drunken lemurs". Adams later stated that fans of his work should "stick to posting Garfield strips, as no one gets fired for that".

== Guest artists ==
On February 29, 2016, Adams posted on his blog that he would be taking a six-week vacation. During that time, strips would be written by him but drawn by guest artists who work for Universal Uclick. CNN television anchorman Jake Tapper drew the strip on the week of May 23. The other guest artists were John Glynn, Eric Scott, Josh Shipley, Joel Friday, Donna Oatney and Brenna Thummler. Tapper also drew the cartoon strip the week of September 23–28, 2019.

== See also ==
- Bristow, a UK cartoon which lampooned office life
- Dilbert principle
- Peter principle, the opposite (and original basis) of the Dilbert principle
