= List of Dilbert characters =

dogbThis is a list of characters that have appeared in Scott Adams' Dilbert comic strip.

== Primary characters ==
=== Dilbert ===
The main character in the strip, Dilbert is a stereotypical technically-minded single male. Prior to October 2014, he was usually wearing a white dress shirt, black trousers and a red-and-black striped tie that inexplicably curves upward; since then, he has worn a red polo shirt with a name badge on a lanyard around his neck. Dilbert received his master's degree in electrical engineering from MIT; he understands engineering well and has good ideas, but has a poor social life. Neither attractive nor blessed with tremendous social graces, Dilbert is capable, but ignored at work and struggles with his romantic life. While he is frequently seen having dates with eligible women, his dates almost invariably end in disaster, usually in surreal and bizarre ways. Dilbert loves computers and technology and will spend much of his free time playing with such things. He had a girlfriend named Liz for a little over two years, but she started dating other men, stating that she would still date Dilbert, but date other men at the same time.

=== Pointy-haired Boss ===
The oblivious manager of Dilbert and the other engineers, and sometimes the main antagonist of the strip; his real name is never mentioned. Scott Adams states that he never named him so that people can imagine him to be their boss. First mentioned on April 20, 1989, he was depicted as a stereotypical late-middle-aged balding middle manager with jowls; it was not until October 21, 1991 that he developed his signature "pointy hair" and the jowls disappeared. He is hopelessly incompetent at management, and often tries to compensate for his lack of skills with countless group therapy sessions and business strategies that fail to bear fruit. He does not understand technical issues but always tries to disguise this, usually by using buzzwords he also does not understand. The Boss treats his employees alternately with enthusiasm or neglect; he often uses them to his own ends regardless of the consequences to them. Adams himself wrote that "He's not sadistic, just uncaring". His level of intelligence varies from near-vegetative to perceptive and clever, depending on the strip's comic needs. His utter lack of consistent business ethics, however, is perfectly consistent. His brother is a demon named "Phil, the Prince of Insufficient Light", and according to Adams, the pointy hair is intended to remind one of devil's horns.

=== Wally ===
One of the oldest engineers, Wally was originally a worker trying to get fired to obtain a large severance package. He hates work and avoids it whenever he can. He often carries a cup of coffee, calmly sipping from it even in the midst of chaos or office-shaking revelations. Wally is extremely cynical. He is even more socially inept than Dilbert (though far less self-aware of the fact), and references to his lack of personal hygiene are not uncommon. Like the Pointy-Haired Boss, Wally is utterly lacking in ethics and will take advantage of any situation to maximize his personal gain while doing the least possible amount of honest work. Squat and balding, Wally is almost invariably portrayed wearing a short sleeved dress shirt and tie. Adams has stated that Wally was based on a Pacific Bell coworker of his who was interested in a generous employee buy-out program—for the company's worst employees. This had the effect of causing this man—whom Adams describes as "one of the more brilliant people I've met"—to work hard at being incompetent, rude, and generally poor at his job to qualify for the buy-out program. Adams has said that this inspired the basic laziness and amorality of Wally's character. Despite these personality traits, Wally is accepted as part of Dilbert, Ted, Alice, and Asok's clique. Although his relationship with Alice is often antagonistic and Dilbert occasionally denies being his friend, their actions show at least a certain acceptance of him. He has openly admitted that all his good ideas are about coffee, that sometimes include sabotaging rival companies coffee so they only have decaf.

=== Alice ===
One of the more competent engineers. She is often frustrated at her work because she does not get proper recognition. She believes it is because she is female, though in reality it is likely because she has a quick, often violent temper, sometimes putting her lethal "Fist of Death" to use, even with the Pointy-Haired Boss.

=== Dogbert ===
Dilbert's anthropomorphic pet dog is the smartest dog on Earth. Dogbert is a megalomaniacal intellectual, planning to one day conquer the world. After taking over the world, he plans to enslave all those not in Dogbert's New Ruling Class, his elite group of followers. In one story line, he actually succeeded, but became bored with the ensuing peace, and quit. Often seen in high-ranking consultant or technical support jobs, he constantly abuses his power and fools the management of Dilbert's company, though considering the intelligence of the company's management in general and Dilbert's boss in particular, this is not very hard to do. He also enjoys pulling scams on unsuspecting, and usually dull customers to steal their money. However, despite Dogbert's cynical exterior, he has been known to pull his master out of some tight jams. Dogbert's nature as a pet was more emphasized during the earlier years of the strip; as the strip progressed, references to his acting like a dog became less common, although he still wags his tail when he perpetrates his scams. When an older Dilbert arrives while time-traveling from the future, he refers to Dogbert as "majesty", indicating that Dogbert will one day indeed rule the world again.

=== Asok ===
A young intern, he works very hard but does not always get proper recognition. Asok is intensely intelligent but naive about corporate life; the shattering of his optimistic illusions becomes frequent comic fodder. He is Indian, and has graduated from the Indian Institutes of Technology (IIT). The other workers, especially the boss, often unwittingly trample on his cultural beliefs. On the occasions when Asok mentions this, he is normally ignored. His test scores (a perfect 1600 on the old SAT) and his IQ of 240 show that he is the smartest member of the engineering team. Nonetheless he is often called upon by the Boss to do odd jobs, and in meetings his ideas are usually left hanging. He is also seen regularly at the lunch table with Wally and Dilbert, experiencing jarring realizations of the nature of corporate life. There are a few jokes about his psychic powers, which he learned at the IIT. Yet despite his intelligence, ethics and mystical powers, Asok sometimes takes advice from Wally in the arts of laziness, and from Dilbert in surviving the office. As of February 7, 2014, Asok is officially gay, which never impacts any storylines but merely commemorates a decision by the Indian Supreme Court to uphold an anti-gay law.

=== Ted ===
An engineer who is often seen hanging out with Wally. He is referenced by name more often in older comics, but he is still seen occasionally now. He is a friend of Dilbert and Wally, but is not seen interacting with Alice or Asok as much. He has been accepted into Dilbert's clique. He has been fired and killed numerous times (for example, being pushed down a flight of stairs and becoming possessed), so it is likely that he is rehired and brought back to life in a similar way to the other main characters who die and come back. In addition to this, he is often promoted and given benefits over the other employees. Ted has a wife and kids who are referenced multiple times and seen on at least one occasion. Scott Adams refers to him as Ted the Generic Guy because whenever Scott needs to fire or kill someone, he uses Ted, but slowly over time Ted has become his own character. Ted appears in an episode of the series "Y2K", and is mentioned in "the Little People".

== Secondary characters ==
=== Loud Howard ===
Another coworker who became a regular character in the TV series, despite appearing in just a few comic strips on April 21, 1995 and March 17, 2006, and again by popular request on October 11, 2006. Loud Howard is incapable of speaking quietly, and in the TV series his overpowering voice often breaks anything and everything around him, including people's eardrums. It has also shattered glass, caused his fillings to vibrate so hard they fall out of his teeth, slammed people against the wall and rendered his sneezes powerful enough to strip a person's flesh from their bones. He lives by an airport, which likely accounts for his loud voice.

Loud Howard made a reappearance on May 24, 2012, where he meets Topper and they both have a shouting match right outside Dilbert's cubicle.

=== Carol ===
The bitter secretary of the Pointy-Haired Boss, who hates her boss and all of her co-workers. Initially a minor character in the strip, her character grew enough in popularity over the years that Adams started creating complete storylines for her. Her character was based on all the bad experiences Adams ever had with any secretary. Several strips feature Carol menacing or attacking co-workers with a crossbow (Known as the "Secretary with a Crossbow"). Carol frequently attempts to put the Pointy-haired boss in situations where he will be killed; she states this to the boss directly on numerous occasions. She has, for example: encouraged him to buy a build-it-yourself helicopter kit; scheduled his business trips via third world countries experiencing rebel insurrections; caused him to crash his car by sending him texts marked 'crisis' so that he will answer them while driving; scheduled 'walking meetings' so that his lack of physical coordination may cause self-injury, for example by falling off a bridge, and holding a press conference stating that her boss is an infamous serial killer. Carol's two young, poorly behaved children also make appearances in the strip. She is voiced by Tress MacNeille in the animated TV series.

=== Ratbert ===
A rat formerly used as a laboratory test animal. A cheerful character and something of a nitwit though he does make the occasional brilliant observation. He usually gets all the lowest jobs but has been seen as a consultant before. He has made the pointy-haired boss fall under his consultant spell. Dilbert originally disliked Ratbert for being a rat, but Ratbert is later accepted as a member of the family. He was not originally intended as a regular character, but because of his popularity with readers he was kept.

Ratbert first appeared on July 23, 1990. He was not originally intended to be a regular, instead being part of a series of strips featuring a lab scientist's cruel experiments (Ratbert's name at this stage was XP-39C²). Ratbert soon realized that he was the subject of a hideous macaroni and cheese experiment (the scientist made him eat huge amounts of it and writes in his notebook that it causes paranoia in rats) and escaped, eventually finding a refuge in Dilbert's house. He was not initially accepted by the residents, especially Dilbert, who was highly prejudiced against rats. However, he finally allowed Ratbert to become a permanent member of the household.

Ratbert chose his name through a discussion with Dogbert. Dogbert suggested names such as 'Rodney the Rodent' and 'Vernon the Vermin'. XP-39C² suggested the name 'Bill the Rat' before finally settling on 'Ratbert'.

As a simple rat, and having been specially bred to be susceptible to peer pressure, Ratbert is very gullible and innocent, although optimistic. Sometimes his actions can become quite annoying, such as doing "rat dances". Like Dogbert, he has made inroads into business, once working as an intern, a concierge, a consultant (with an "external brain-pack" tied to his torso, which was actually a slab of liver) and vice-president of marketing (for which he was hired on the basis of his week in a dumpster at Procter & Gamble). He also became CEO after a series of strips that involved the previous CEO jumping into a volcano and the first replacement (a vampire) burning up due to daylight. Ratbert was fired for varnishing employees for use as office furniture. He received a severance package of $100 million, the corporate jet, perpetual benefits and a salary of $1 million per year.

Ratbert's biggest ambition in life is to become loved and accepted. He tries to impress those he considers his friends on various occasions, and nearly always fails miserably. Just as Dogbert protects Dilbert on numerous occasions despite his contempt for him, so do Ratbert's friends and family. Ratbert is friendly with Bob the Dinosaur, and is also good friends with Mister Garbage Man, who tries—and fails—to enlighten Ratbert on the complexities of the universe.

=== Catbert ===
The company's evil feline Human Resources director. Although he was originally just supposed to be around for a few strips, the fans named him and demanded more of him.

An unnamed cat appeared in two 1992 strips as the companion of Dilbert's "perfect romantic match"; he or she strongly resembled the later Catbert design. The real Catbert, unnamed, first appeared in a series of comic strips from September 12 to 16, 1994, when he attacked Ratbert and rebooted Dilbert's computer before Dogbert finally kicked him out of the house. Reader response asked for "more Catbert," despite the cat never having been named, and Adams decided to bring him back as the "evil director" of human resources. Catbert appeared again on March 20, 1995, when Dogbert hired Catbert to handle downsizing (a process that leads to Alice and Wally running for the new org chart and colliding so hard that they ended up wearing each other's clothes, backwards).

With the help of his "random policy generator", he comes up with sadistic, illogical, and often evil policies to force on the employees, such as permanently branding them, requiring them to schedule sick time before they actually get sick, replacing the health plan with Google, and making time spent in the bathroom count as "vacation". He also has the help of his "Life Suck 3000" (to suck the life force out of employees faster than normal), and his library of HR binders that give strategies on downsizing and hiring of morons specifically. He often works in tandem with the Pointy-Haired Boss, though on occasion he even harasses him with his policies. Catbert typically celebrates the creation of a new evil policy by purring loudly, hugging himself, doing the "evil dance" or by occasionally laughing himself fuzzy.

He often abuses workers by doing things like sending Wally home for wearing shorts, even though Wally's pants reach his ankles. He also claws up employees, once batted Dilbert's head off, hid Asok the intern in his litter box, and pulled some strings to get Wally moved to a window cubicle (so as to use Wally's head as a bed to lie on while warming himself in the sun).

Catbert's more cat-like traits include use of the litter box, purring, and lying on warm or sun-heated surfaces.

Some of his own strategies have been known to backfire on him, like the August 2007 strips where he made the employees wear brain monitoring helmets when he suspected they were thinking about pleasant stuff rather than work. Wally, naturally, was the first whose helmet went off, and when Catbert went over what he was thinking about he went metaphorically "blind", possibly with the same reaction the Pointy-haired boss afterwards had: "I was happier not knowing."

His more evil nature is also kept in with the TV series, voiced by comedian, Jason Alexander, with a notable example being his forging a confession in Dilbert's name claiming Dilbert had been responsible for pilfering dry erase markers as well as using his computer for X-rated sites (as well as completely unrelated crimes such as the Lindbergh kidnapping and the shooting of Larry Flynt), as well as publicly announcing Dilbert's "signing" of the confession with permission given to the other employees to treat Dilbert like a pariah.

=== Dilbert's mother ===
Dilbert's mother (known by fans as "Dilmom") is a homely and intelligent woman. She used to think Dilbert worked at a railroad because he is an engineer. She is often selfish and openly uncaring towards her son; in the TV series she states that, although she loves him, she does not actually like him (but she does like Dogbert). The comic often shows her and her son passive-aggressively attempting to get out of seeing each other. She has nearly the same level of technical knowledge as Dilbert, although she has him do technical work for her. She is obsessed with Scrabble and has been accused of cheating with "counterfeit vowels". (This is a reference to Scott Adams' own mother.) She is voiced by Jackie Hoffman in the TV series. Her husband has been missing for years, at a 24-hour "All-You-Can-Eat" restaurant in the local mall (he will not leave until it is all he can eat); in the animated series, she was touched by a surveillance video of him, given to her by Dilbert and Dogbert.

Dilbert's mother's name appears in the April 12, 2006 and the May 31, 2009 strips. She is also called "Dilmom" in the TV series episode "Hunger", by Dogbert and later a TV announcer.

=== Phil, the Prince of Insufficient Light ===
A parody of Satan (the "Prince of Darkness"), Phil ("Prince of Insufficient Light and Supreme Ruler of Heck") is a minor demon who punishes people for small crimes by "darning them to heck" with his "pitch-spoon". Such crimes include using copier paper for the printer, stealing a chair from another cubicle, and finishing off the last coffee from the coffee maker without making another pot. As a minor demon, Phil's punishments are annoying, rather than tormenting, such as being forced to sit at a secretary's desk and be teased by coworkers, or being forced to sit among the accountants at lunchtime and listen to their boring conversations, or, in one strip, "using the spoon" (which involved spooning with said person). Phil was eventually revealed to be the Pointy-Haired Boss's brother. Adams is inconsistent with his depictions of Phil, who sometimes has horns and sometimes does not, and sometimes carries a pitchfork rather than a spoon. Adams has stated that the inconsistency is because he sometimes forgets that Phil is not supposed to have a cape or a pitchfork. He also drank milk.

=== Bob the Dinosaur ===
A vegetarian dinosaur who tries to avoid using modern technology and seems proud of his low-tech lifestyle. He was found after Dilbert calculated that dinosaurs could not be extinct, and they therefore must be in hiding. Bob was found hidden behind the couch. Bob has a wife (Dawn) and son (Rex), who also live in Dilbert's house, but they are seen far less frequently than he is, since most of his time is spent at Dilbert's office, where his wedgie duty is constantly needed while working with incompetent co-workers, salesmen, or clients. He has also revealed that, being a dinosaur, he is of course mistaken for a COBOL programmer. Bob likes to nap and eat carrots. In the television series, he appears in the cold opening of the episode "The Little People".

=== Mister Garbage Man ===
Dilbert's garbageman is frequently described in the comic as "the world's smartest garbageman". He appears for the first time in the strip of December 5, 1989. He occasionally solves extremely complex problems for Dilbert and in various strips has developed several futuristic inventions. He once returned Dilbert from the dead by repairing the cloning device that Dilbert had thrown into the garbage. In the TV show, it is revealed that he is the only garbageman for the whole city and is able to collect for all houses through "shortcuts" (i.e. wormholes).

=== Tina ===
Tina is a technical writer who was introduced both to add more females to the cast and to satirize the technical writing profession of the late 20th century. Tina was portrayed as a frustrated feminist, always on the defensive about her skills and her value to the company. She was sometimes referred to as "Tina, the brittle technical writer." She never appears in the TV series, but she appears in some of the animated shorts.

== Elbonians ==
People from a fictional Fourth World nation, used as a parody of outsourcing. Their culture is radically different from Western culture, and their patriarchy often annoys Alice. Their country is covered in waist-deep mud which they keep wet using expensive bottled water, as revealed in one strip. The main vehicle of their national airline is essentially a giant slingshot. At one point, the French declared war on Elbonia because they tried to launch a satellite with the town slingshot, thereby flattening the French Embassy before Dilbert can intercede; Elbonia ultimately benefited from the war, because the sale of pieces of French bombs became a significant part of the national income. At another time Dogbert lobbied Switzerland to "liberate" Elbonia's oil. Dogbert once became the king of Elbonia, but Dilbert convinced him to abdicate. Elbonia was first described as an Eastern European nation that had recently overthrown communist rule. Scott Adams stated in Seven Years of Highly Defective People that Elbonia was created to allow for a foreign nation inoffensive to people outside the United States, and is based on the average American's perception of any country without cable television.

== Accounting trolls ==
Sadistic trolls from the accounting department whose bodies are 95% saliva. As Dogbert shows, their brains are so hard-wired that seeing someone wearing a baseball cap backwards causes their heads to explode (which he called "paradigm shifting without a clutch"). The trolls' accounting offices resemble a cavernous Hell. They were originally ruled by a witch who turned Dilbert into an accounting troll, but was destroyed when Dilbert, assigned to budget erasing, erased the accounting department's budget. The trolls are rarely given names, but occasionally a troll by the name Nordlaw is referenced. The first troll introduced in the comics was named Bradley. Their original name was Erv.

== Minor recurring characters ==
=== Ming ===
"Web Mistress", occasionally dates Mordac.

=== Mother Nature ===
Mother Nature, the ruler of the Earth, judges the characters (usually Dilbert) about how they treat nature.

=== Company Lawyer ===
The company's lawyer. He claims he could have been in almost any legal profession, yet still ended up there. The Pointy Haired Boss uses his bitterness to shut down any project he dislikes.

=== Mordac ===
A senior system/network administrator or manager at Dilbert's company, Mordac the Preventer of Information Services (also known as Mordac the Refuser) strives to make the use of the company's computing resources as difficult and frustrating as possible. In most cases, the ridiculous or over-the-top restrictions he introduces are explained as in line with the company's IT policy (then again, he might be the one writing that policy). In one strip he claimed to have lost the file containing his job description and that he has been "winging it" for five years. There have however been cases — for instance, when he made obscure changes to the network without testing just before allegedly leaving for a three-week vacation on a Russian submarine above the Arctic Circle — when his actions could only be explained by malice. His motives are unclear, although his demeanor suggests he simply takes pleasure using his management and technical powers to make the users of "his" systems suffer. On one occasion, he was attacked while confronting Dilbert by Catbert, as he had made Catbert's personal printer a shared device. In more recent strips he looks different. He has pointed ears and hairstyle much like a Vulcan. He appeared once with a sidekick, "Walter the Budget Man", in the "Merger" episode of the animated series. Here he was voiced by Maurice LaMarche.

=== Topper ===
A relatively frequently recurring character in the strip. Whenever anyone mentions in Topper's earshot any difficult task he or she accomplished, he barges into the conversation with a smug facial expression, exclaiming, "That's nothing!" He then proceeds to top the other's statement with his own, obviously implausible or downright ridiculous, claim (e.g. insulating his house with cheese, implanting himself with insect organs so he can spin silk, or passing a gallstone so big it became the Secretary of Labor in Clinton's administration). He seems to be genuinely offended when the others express disbelief in his purported exploits. He allegedly cannot start a conversation, as he claims that it "ruins his system."

=== Dadbert ===
An unseen character in the comic strip, although he does appear in the animated series, in which his face is hidden in a fashion similar to some of the humans from "Tom and Jerry" or Wilson from "Home Improvement". He left the family during a trip to the mall in 1992 (1979 in the TV series) in order to visit a 24-hour all-you-can-eat restaurant. He refuses to leave until he is sure he has had all he can eat.

=== Liz ===
Dilbert's girlfriend from 1994 to 1996. He met her at a soccer game, where she rebounded a ball off his head to score a goal. Liz would constantly taunt Dilbert about their comparative levels of attractiveness and his obsession with technology, though Dilbert always took such comments in stride. Adams admitted in Seven Years of Highly Defective People that "Liz never really clicked with me", and eventually had her break up with Dilbert, after she started dating other men. She is Dilbert's longest relationship.

=== The C.E.O. ===
The chief executive officer (C.E.O.) of the unnamed company that Dilbert works at has been shown to be incompetent to some level (though not as much as the pointy haired boss) and often at meetings makes a desperate attempt to seem like, as the pointy haired boss put it, "just plain folk". Since 2003, the C.E.O. has been drawn as a young bald man with a big head.

=== The Company Robot ===
The Company's Robot was bought by the pointy haired boss to replace Wally. All it was supposed to do was drink coffee and look at inappropriate Web sites, which Wally admitted was all he did. It was hacked by Dilbert and Wally to make it disgruntled, to make sure Wally kept his job. The robot has appeared on occasion since, especially when plotting for robots to take over the world.

=== Bearded suspender guy ===
An old-style computing guy who likes to reminisce about the old days, he's a UNIX user and software architect to whom both Wally and Alice have taken exception. He has appeared with white, black and brown hair, but all appearances include suspenders. He is widely rumored to be based on computer scientist and cryptographer Igor Faynberg (a Bell Labs Fellow), who admits that this may be the case, but has no memory of having met Adams.

=== Zimbu the Monkey ===
A monkey that works at Dilbert's office, who is always a better employee than Dilbert due to his tail, which enables him to be more productive by using his tail to control the mouse and his hands to type. He appears in the episode "Y2K" voiced by Tom Kenny.
