= List of philosophers associated with Balliol College, Oxford =

This is a list of philosophers associated with Balliol College, Oxford.

== Philosophers and social-political theorists ==
Image	Name	Join Date	Field of work	Comments	Refs
	Sir William Hamilton	1807	metaphysics	Professor of Logic and Metaphysics, Edinburgh; Philosophy of the Unconditioned 1829	
	Thomas Hill Green	1854	British idealism	Whyte's Professor of Moral Philosophy; Husband of Charlotte Byron Symonds who promoted women's education His teaching is considered the most potent philosophical influence in England during the last quarter of the 19th century, cited by many social liberal politicians, often Balliol alumni, such as Herbert Samuel and H. H. Asquith; Prolegomena to Ethics 1884 posthumously	
	Edward Caird	1860	British idealism	FBA, FRSE; Chair of Moral Philosophy, Glasgow; Master of Balliol brother of theologian John Caird; The Evolution of Religion 1893	
	Alfred Barratt	1862	panpsychism	Fellow, Brasenose College; Physical Ethics 1869	
	William Wallace	1864	German philosophy	Fellow of Merton College; White's Professor of Moral Philosophy; The Logic and Prolegomena of Hegel 1873; Kant 1882	
	Richard Lewis Nettleship	1865	British idealism	Fellow; The Theory of Education in Plato's Republic 1935 (43 years posthumous)	
	Bernard Bosanquet	1866	British idealism	FBA; Husband of social theorist and reformer Helen Bosanquet; The Philosophical Theory of the State 1899	
	John Cook Wilson	1867	logic	FBA, Fellow of New College; Wykeham Professor of Logic; Disputed the barbershop paradox with Lewis Carroll	
	David George Ritchie	1873	British idealism	Fellow; Professor of Logic and Metaphysics, St Andrews; Natural Rights 1895	
	Ralph Radcliffe Whitehead	1874	arts and crafts	Founded Byrdcliffe Colony New York	
	Samuel Alexander	1878	emergentist	OM, FBA; Professor of Philosophy, Manchester; Moral Order and Progress 1889	
	F. C. S. Schiller	1882	pragmatism	FBA, Fellow, Corpus Christi College, Oxford; Visiting Professor USC	
	John Alexander Smith	1883	British idealism	FBA; Waynflete Professor of Moral and Metaphysical Philosophy; Instigator of the new PPE degree	
	Robert Ranulph Marett	1885	anthropology	Rector of Exeter College	
	Harold Joachim	1886	coherence theory of truth	FBA; Wykeham Professor of Logic; The Nature of Truth 1906	
	Sir Ernest Barker	1893	political science	FBA, Principal KCL; Professor, Political Science, Cambridge	
	Sir W. D. Ross	1896	moral realism	FBA; White's Professor of Moral Philosophy; The Right and the Good	
	Sir Leon Simon	1900	Zionism	Balfour Declaration; President, Hebrew University	
	Olaf Stapledon	1905	transhumanism	expressed philosophy through Science Fiction; Last and First Men	
	Herbert James Paton	1908	German philosophy	FBA; White's Professor of Moral Philosophy brains behind the Curzon Line 1919 splitting Poland	
	John Macmurray	1913	personalism	Fellow; Grote Professor of Mind and Logic at UCL; Professor of Moral Philosophy, Edinburgh	
	Austin Marsden Farrer	1923	theology	FBA, Fellow, Trinity College, Oxford; Warden, Keble College "one of the greatest figures of 20th-century Anglicanism"	
	John Niemeyer Findlay	1924	rational mysticism	Rhodes Scholar; Professor of Philosophy, KCL/Yale/Boston	
	J. L. Austin	1929	philosophy of language	FBA, White's Professor of Moral Philosophy leading proponent of ordinary language philosophy How to Do Things with Words 1955	
	Norman O. Brown	1932	Freudo-Marxism	professor of classics at Wesleyan	
	Sir Stuart Hampshire	1933	philosophy of mind	FBA, Grote Professor of the Philosophy of Mind and Logic, UCL; Head of Philosophy, Princeton; Warden, Wadham College; Thought and Action	
	Peter Geach	1934	Philosophical logic	Hon. Fellow, Professor of Logic, Leeds married to philosopher Elizabeth Anscombe	
	R. M. Hare	1937	moral philosophy	FBA,White's Professor of Moral Philosophy; The Language of Morals 1952	
	David Pears	1939	Ludwig Wittgenstein	Professor of Philosophy, Logic and Scientific Method, LSE "one-man crusader for critical rationalism" Words and Things 1959	
	Richard Wollheim	1941	philosophy of art	Grote Professor of Mind and Logic, UCL; Art And Its Objects	
	Ernest Gellner	1943	European philosophy	FBA, Fellow, Christ Church "the only Wittgensteinian to get Wittgenstein right"	
	Sir Bernard Williams	1947	Moral philosophy	FBA, Knightbridge Professor of Philosophy, Cambridge; White's Professor of Moral Philosophy at Oxford "a good claim to be the leading British philosopher of his day" (Martin Hollis); Utilitarianism: For and Against CUP 1973	
	John Lucas	1947	philosophy of mathematics	FBA, Fellow at Merton College; Minds, Machines and Gödel 1959	
	Alan Montefiore	1948	European philosophy	Fellow; A Modern Introduction to Moral PhilosophyRoutledge 1958	
	Peter Sedgwick	1952	international socialism	PsychoPolitics 1982	
	Charles Taylor	1952	political philosophy	FRSC, Rhodes Scholar, Professor at McGill; The first president of the Oxford Campaign for Nuclear Disarmament; A Secular Age HUP 2007	
	Steven Lukes	1958	sociology	FBA, professor of politics and sociology at NYU; Power: A Radical View 3rd Ed. 2021	
	Alan Ryan	1959	political philosophy	FBA, Professor of Politics, Oxford; The Philosophy of John Stuart Mill MacMillan 1970	
	Hans Sluga	1960	German philosophy	Professor, Berkeley; The Cambridge Companion to Wittgenstein CUP 1996	
	Derek Parfit	1961	moral philosophy	Fellow of All Souls widely considered one of the most important and influential moral philosophers of the late 20th and early 21st centuries, whose first book, Reasons and Persons (OUP 1984) has been described as the most significant work of moral philosophy since the 1800s	
	Sir Neil MacCormick	1963	jurisprudence	FRS, FRSE, Fellow; Regius Chair of Public Law, Edinburgh; MEP; Law, State and Practical Reason, OUP 2011	
	Roy Bhaskar	1963	critical realism	Master; A Realist Theory of Science, Verso 1975	
	Robert D. Putnam	1963	social capital	Fulbright Fellow two-level game theoryBowling Alone	
	Sir Anthony Kenny	1964	philosophy of mind	Master; A New History of Western Philosophy OUP 2010	
	Kit Fine	1964	philosophical logic	Professor of Philosophy and Mathematics, New York; Vagueness: A Global Approach OUP 2020	
	Martin Hollis	1965	rationality	Tutor; Professor, University of East Anglia editor Ratio; Puzzler	
	Arthur Prior	1967	temporal logic	Fellow; Time and Modality, OUP 1957	
	William Newton-Smith	1967	philosophy of science	Fellow; The Rationality of Science Routledge 1981	
	David Miller	1967	social justice	Professor of Political Theory, Oxford	
	Alex Callinicos	1968	Trotskyism	The Revolutionary Ideas of Karl Marx 2012	
	Michael E. Rosen	1970	Continental philosophy	Professor of Government at Harvard	
	Joseph Raz	1972	jurisprudence	FBA, Fellow; The Concept of a Legal System: An Introduction to the Theory of a Legal System, 2nd Ed OUP 1980	
	Hilary Lawson	1973	anti-realism	TV producer Founded the Institute of Art and Ideas	
	Tom Sorell	1973	early modern philosophy, applied philosophy	Professor of Politics and Philosophy, University of Warwick Hobbes (Routledge, 1986) Scientism (Routledge, 1991) Descartes Reinvented (Cambridge University Press, 2005) Emergencies and Politics (Cambridge University Press, 2013)	
	Timothy Williamson	1974	philosophical logic	Wykeham Professor of Logic, Fellow of New College; Knowledge and Its Limits OUP 2000	
	Ewan Ferlie	1974	public sector management	professor of public services management at King's College London	
	Michael Sandel	1975	political philosophy	Rhodes Scholar, Professor of Government, Harvard; Justice: the right things to do, popular Harvard course	
	Sir Geoff Mulgan	1979	collective intelligence	Professor of Collective Intelligence, Public Policy and Social Innovation at UCL	
	Adrian William Moore	1979	metaphysics	FBA, Professor of Philosophy, Oxford; The Evolution of Modern Metaphysics: Making Sense of Things, CUP 2012	
	Stephen Macedo	1980	liberalism	Professor of Politics at Princeton	
	Ian Rumfitt	1983	philosophy of language	FBA, Fellow, All Souls; The Boundary Stones of Thought, Clarendon 2015	
	Paul W. Franks	1983	Jewish philosophy	Professor of Philosophy, Yale; All or Nothing: Skepticism, Transcendental Arguments and Systematicity in German Idealism, HUP 2005	
	Cheryl Misak	1984	pragmatism	Rhodes Scholar, FRSC; Professor of Philosophy, Toronto; Frank Ramsey: A Sheer Excess of Powers, OUP 2020	
	Stephen Mulhall	1984	German philosophy	Fellow, New College; The Great Riddle: Wittgenstein and Nonsense, Theology and Philosophy, OUP 2015	
	Robert Maximilian de Gaynesford	1986	philosophy of language	Professor of Philosophy, Reading; I: The Meaning of the First Person Term; Clarendon 2006	
	Michael Otsuka	1986	political philosophy	Professor of Philosophy, Rutgers; Libertarianism Without Inequality; OUP 2003	
	Herman Cappelen	1987	philosophy of language	Professor of Philosophy, Hong Kong; Bad Language (with Josh Dever); OUP 2019	
	John Tasioulas	1989	moral philosophy	Rhodes Scholar; Professor of Ethics and Legal Philosophy	
	Katherine Hawley	1989	metaphysics	How Things Persist 2002; How To Be Trustworthy 2020	
	Graeme Garrard	1990	political philosophy	Professor of Politics at Cardiff; The Return of the State: And Why it is Essential for our Health, Wealth and Happiness 2022	
	Raj Patel	1991	social justice	Stuffed and StarvedThe Value of Nothing	
	Alice Sullivan	1992	sociology	Professor, UCL. Advocates data on biological sex and gender identity should be recorded as distinct categories	
	Aly Kassam-Remtulla	1999	multiculturalism	Vice Provost for International Affairs, Princeton	
	Toby Ord	2003	effective altruism	Founded Giving What We Can; The Precipice: Existential Risk and the Future of Humanity	
