= Arthur Ritchie Lord =

Arthur Ritchie Lord (1880–1941) was an English philosopher in the tradition of British idealism. From 1905 he was Professor of Philosophy and History at Rhodes University College.

== Early life ==
He was born at Chudleigh on 5 February 1880, son of Robert G. Lord of Scotleigh, a medical officer in India who had retired as Deputy Surgeon-General; his father was originally from county Cork. He was educated at Blundell's School and won a scholarship to Balliol College, Oxford in 1897.

Lord graduated B.A. at Balliol in 1902 with a first class in Greats. He had studied with Edward Caird, the Master, Harold H. Joachim and John Alexander Smith of the college. He was also taught political thought by William George Pogson-Smith, an editor of Thomas Hobbes, at that point a tutor attached to St John's College.

== Academic ==
On graduating, Lord took a position as assistant to James Black Baillie at the University of Aberdeen, where he was a lecturer on political science.

At Rhodes University College at Grahamstown, Cape Province, South Africa from 1905, Lord took over some of the teaching of Arthur Stanley Kidd. His Department of Mental and Moral Science covered also psychology, for which a lecturer was eventually appointed. Students at his lectures included Ronald Fairbridge Currey, Frederick Stanley Livie-Noble, Francis Phelps and Francis Carey Slater. One who was strongly influenced was Errol Harris. The college did not fund an assistant for his teaching burden. In 1926 Lord suggested that the college could provide tutorial assistance for external students. The idea received a cool reception.

Lord corresponded with James Bryce. In poor health, he retired in 1940 and died from cancer the following year.

== Works ==
William Sweet wrote that Lord's work in ethics and political philosophy was "clearly in line" with that of T. H. Green and Bernard Bosanquet. Lord in 1911 was awarded the triennial Green Moral Philosophy Prize awarded by the University of Oxford with an essay on "The Passions" (now lost, according to Sweet). The examiners for the prize had chosen in 1910 the title "The Passions and their Importance in Morals". That title appears on an essay in Robert Morrison MacIver, Politics and Society (1969).

- The Principles of Politics: An Introduction to the Study of the Evolution of Political Ideas (1921, reprinted in 2006)
- The History of Philosophy from Descartes to Hegel (2006)
- Foundational Problems in Philosophy: Politics, Ethics, Aesthetics, and Religion (2006)

The three volumes from 2006 were edited by William Sweet and Errol Harris.

== Family ==
Lord married in 1907 Hilda Maud Waide; the couple had two sons.
