= Errol E. Harris =

American philosopher

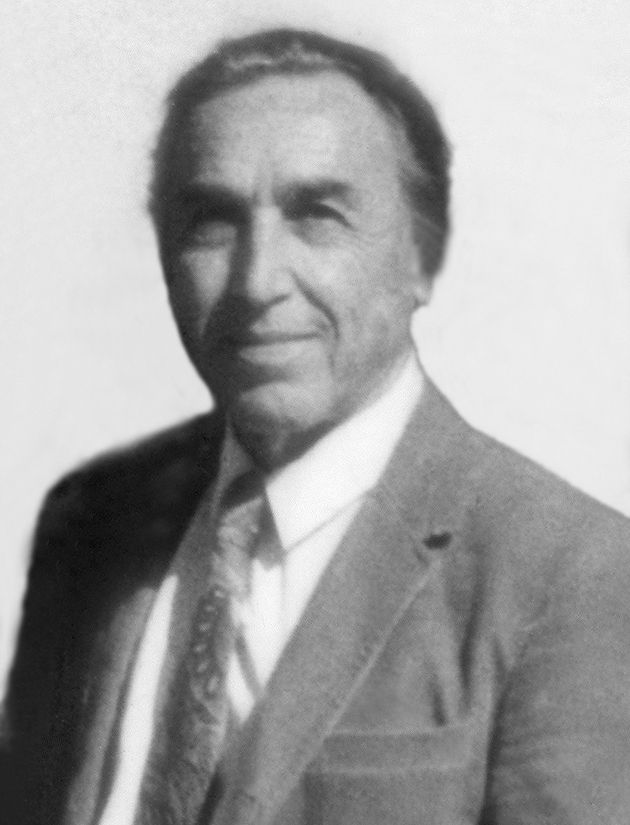
- Born: Errol Eustace Harris; 19 February 1908; Kimberley, Cape Colony (present-day South Africa)
- Died: 21 June 2009 (aged 101); Lake District, Cumbria, England

Education
- Education: Rhodes University; Magdalen College, Oxford
- Academic advisors: H. H. Joachim; John Alexander Smith

Philosophical work
- Era: 20th-century philosophy
- Region: Western philosophy
- School: British idealism
- Institutions: University of the Witwatersrand; Yale University; Connecticut College; Edinburgh University; University of Kansas; Northwestern University
- Main interests: Metaphysics, ontology, logic, epistemology, philosophy of science
- Notable ideas: Dialectical holism Criticism of empiricism

Errol Eustace Harris (19 February 1908 – 21 June 2009), sometimes cited as E. E. Harris, was an American South-African philosopher. His work focused on developing a systematic and coherent account of the logic, metaphysics, and epistemology implicit in contemporary understanding of the world. Harris held that, in conjunction with empirical science, the Western philosophical tradition, in its commitment to the ideal of reason, contains the resources necessary to accomplish this end. He celebrated his 100th birthday in 2008.

== Life ==
Errol E. Harris was born on 19 February 1908 in Kimberley, South Africa, to parents who had emigrated from Leeds, England. His father, Samuel Jack Harris, had been one of the defenders of Kimberley when he was besieged there (together with Cecil Rhodes) during the Boer War. Errol studied philosophy at Rhodes University in South Africa, where he was a student of A. R. Lord and where he obtained his B.A. and M.A., and at Magdalen College, Oxford, where he obtained a B.Litt. degree with a thesis on Samuel Alexander and Alfred North Whitehead.

He served as an education officer for the British Colonial Service, and during World War II was Chief Instructor of the Middle East Military Education College at Mt. Carmel, Palestine, with the rank of Major in the Education Corps of the British Army. He was succeeded as Chief Instructor by Huw Wheldon, later Managing Director of the BBC; another Instructor was Capt. Michael Stewart, later Foreign Secretary in Harold Wilson's government, and subsequently Baron Stewart of Fulham. Errol Harris received his D. Litt. in philosophy from the University of the Witwatersrand in 1950, where he was secretary, and then president, of the lecturers' association. He became a full professor there in 1953. He served on the executive of the South African Race Relations Board with Chief Luthuli, the Zulu paramount chief, and in this capacity came to know Oliver Tambo (Nelson Mandela's law partner, who succeeded Mandela as president of the ANC.), who advised the Board of the ANC's stand on various issues. Harris's first important philosophical work, Nature, Mind and Modern Science, appeared in 1954. In 1956 he went to the United States to lecture at Yale University and Connecticut College, where he was subsequently appointed Professor of Philosophy. This allowed his philosophical activity to prosper unimpeded and gain growing recognition.

From 1959 to 1960 he was Acting Professor of Logic and Metaphysics at Edinburgh University in Scotland, and then returned to Connecticut College. In 1962 he became Roy Roberts Distinguished Professor of Philosophy at the University of Kansas, and in 1966 Professor of Philosophy at Northwestern University, where he was later named John Evans Professor of Moral and Intellectual Philosophy and where he taught until his retirement in 1976. At the World Congress of Philosophy in Vienna in 1968, he chaired the meeting that established the International Society for Metaphysics. After retirement he taught as a visiting professor at Carleton College, Marquette, Villanova (as Distinguished Professor of Christian Philosophy) and Emory Universities and was an honorary research fellow at the Centre for Philosophy and History of Science at Boston University. He was President of the Metaphysical Society of America in 1969 (and in 1985 was awarded the Society's Paul Weiss Medal for the outstanding contribution to Metaphysics), and President of the Hegel Society of America in 1977–8. He had a home near Ambleside in the Lake District in England since 1963, taking up permanent residence there in his latter years. He died on 21 June 2009 at the age of 101.

== Philosophical work ==
During his years at Kansas and Northwestern Harris's major publications included The Foundation of Metaphysics in Science (1965) and Hypothesis and Perception: The Roots of Scientific Method (1970). He has also had an abiding historiographic interest in the metaphysics of Baruch Spinoza and G. W. F. Hegel. Spinoza's philosophy is reconstructed, interpreted, and appropriated by Harris in Salvation from Despair: A Reappraisal of Spinoza's Philosophy (1973). He argued for the cogency, truth, and timeliness of Hegel's speculative logic in An Interpretation of the Logic of Hegel (1983). In retirement his philosophical activity continued uninterrupted, giving rise to numerous articles and volumes, including Formal, Transcendental and Dialectical Thinking: Logic and Reality (1987).

=== Critique of empiricism ===
==== Epistemological and methodological criticisms of empiricism ====
Harris holds the epistemological position that philosophical empiricism was insuperably inconsistent in every version found in European thought from Locke to the twentieth-century analytic philosophers. The verification principle, upon which empiricism is grounded, is held by Harris to be intrinsically false because sense perception is devoid of immediate self-evidence, depending on an interpretative context that is a product of thinking's discursive activity. Furthermore, the verification principle is also unable to account for the empiricist epistemologist's claim to truth for his own doctrine. Empiricism's "fallacy" is that "of propounding a theory of knowledge from which, if it is true, the theorist himself must be exempt, and which, if it applies to the theorist himself, must be false". Nor is empiricism able successfully to overcome the logical antinomies infecting the inductive method, by which it usually tries to explain and justify the genesis and validity of the universal form of scientific theories. Finally, Harris argued that the hypothetico-deductive method, which some empiricists such as Sir Karl Popper employ in order to overcome the shortcomings of the inductive method, is epistemologically unfruitful, owing to its merely analytic and conjectural nature.

==== Theoretical and metaphysical criticisms of empiricism ====
Harris does not limit himself to refuting empiricism in a purely logico-immanent way, but also argues that a careful examination of the theoretical results achieved by contemporary physics, biology, and experimental psychology, as well as of the procedures of scientific enquiry, reveals that empiricism is not even in harmony with the specific orientation of contemporary science. He concludes that science supports a world-view that is relativistic, holistic, organicistic, teleological and hierarchical in character—a world-view contradicted by the unconfessed atomistic, mechanical, and pluralistic metaphysical presuppositions of formal and mathematical logic that are wrongly privileged by philosophical empiricism.

=== Philosophical historiography ===
Harris maintains that the temporal variation of different metaphysical doctrines cannot be regarded as a procession of discontinuous, subjective opinions whose validity, at best, is confined to particular epochs. On the contrary, he asserts the existence of "eternal problems in philosophy" and conceives their historical development as a unique, logically necessary, teleological process through which they progressively achieve more coherent and adequate formulations. Philosophical historiography, therefore, should not simply confine itself to registering the external philological characteristics of the doctrines under consideration without making value judgements about them. Its peculiar task is rather that of discerning in them the true from the false. In his historiographical studies, Harris gives considerable attention to Spinoza's and Hegel's metaphysics.

==== Substance and attributes in Spinoza ====
By stressing the crucial relevance of Spinoza's doctrines of the infinity of the attribute of the cogitatio, of the idea ideae and of the intellectus infinitus dei (the infinite mind of god) as an "infinite mode" of substance, Harris disputed what he saw as one-sided empiricist and materialistic interpretations of Spinoza's naturalism. He argues that Spinoza's polemic against the final causes ought to be understood as referring only to the standpoint of external teleology, and consequently that Spinoza does not exclude a valid explanation of natural processes in the light of an inner teleology. On the other hand, Harris also rejects the opposite, mystical or "acosmistic" interpretations of the relationship between substance and attributes, according to which substance would be undifferentiated and attributes would be nothing more than a contingent product of human intellect. Harris on the contrary maintains that Spinoza's theory of the scientia intuitiva clearly shows that Spinoza consistently conceives of substance's self-identity as intrinsically differentiated into a rational system of "individual essences", and moreover that Spinoza's geometric method is simply the outward dress of an inferential procedure that is similar to dialectical method.

==== Hegel's Naturphilosophie ====
Harris's interpretation of Hegel's philosophy—unlike that of most of Hegelian interpreters in the nineteenth and twentieth centuries—emphasizes the crucial role of Naturphilosophie in Hegel's metaphysics. In the wake of the many philosophical developments which affected the theoretical underpinnings of the natural sciences in the late nineteenth and early twentieth centuries, Harris outlines a "reform" of Hegel's Naturphilosophie that rejects as obsolete at least three of its main contentions: (1) that the natural sciences are nothing more than the product of the finite intellect's analytic activity; (2) that it is impossible cogently to prove the coming-to-be in natural philosophy of a unitary process of real biological evolution; and (3) that the "bad infinity" of the spatiotemporal form of inorganic nature is clear evidence of its self-contradictoriness. According to Harris, in fact, Einstein's theories of special and general relativity, as well as the contemporary cosmological theories of the "expanding universe", involve a plausible conception of the physical universe as a "finite but unbounded Whole", so that it can be safely regarded as an objective, natural embodiment of the infinitum actu, or "true infinity", which Hegel had instead confined to the subjectivity of life and spirit.

=== Harris's epistemology, metaphysics, and philosophy of mind ===
Harris advocates the possibility of knowledge of objective truth; his criticism of the naïve realism of positivistic epistemology never takes the form of subjectivism or skepticism. For him truth is the apex of a teleological process, whose more abstract and elementary forms are the theoretical perspectives worked out by the natural and human sciences, while its most concrete, fully blown aspect coincides with the self-reflective activity of metaphysical thought. The elements of his metaphysics show the acknowledged influences of Spinoza's rationalistic monism, Hegel's absolute idealism, Collingwood's logic, and Joachim's coherence theory of truth. He wrote:

"The philosophical theory demanded by the modern outlook must, accordingly, maintain five main theses: (i) that mind is immanent in all things; (ii) that reality is a whole, self-sufficient and self-maintaining, and that coherence is the test of truth of any theory about it; (iii) that the subject and object of knowledge are ultimately one – the same thing viewed from opposite (and mutually complementary) standpoints; (iv) that events and phenomena can adequately be explained only teleologically, and (v) that the ultimate principle of interpretation is, in consequence, the principle of value."

In Harris's view, the ultimate unity of the subject and object of knowledge means that reality, which is the peculiar object of metaphysical thought, is identical with logical reason, which is the self-conscious act of systematic thought that thinks of reality. For Harris only dialectical logic can grasp the essence of such an identity. By sublating into the absolute idea the very negativity of finitude, appearance and error, only dialectical logic can disclose a logical universe that is not simply an aggregate of "bloodless categories,"but is rather a fully actual, self-sufficient and self-conscious Whole. As a consequence, Harris's metaphysics, like Hegel's, finally develops into a "logic of construction" and a panentheistic theology.

== Legacy ==
In 2017, James Schofield submitted his PhD thesis to the University of Canterbury titled Dialectical Holism: The Lost Metaphysics of E. E. Harris. In this work, he argued that Harris not only anticipated but provided a metaphysical framework for unifying a range of current theories across the otherwise disparate special sciences of cosmology, systems biology, and consciousness studies. Perhaps the most important contention in this regard has been that Harris's work provides a neutral monist ontology for the philosophy of mind known as enactivism.

== Selected bibliography ==
Much of Errol Harris' own philosophical library is housed at the Centre for Idealism and the New Liberalism, the University of Hull, UK.

=== As author ===
- South African Survey (1947)
- The Survival of Political Man, A Study in the Principles of International Order (1950)
- "White" Civilization. How it is Threatened and How it can be Preserved in South Africa (1952)
- Nature, Mind, and Modern Science (1954)
- Revelation Through Reason in the Light of Science and Philosophy (1958)
- Analysis and Insight (1962)
- The Foundations of Metaphysics in Science (1965)
- Annihilation and Utopia (1966)
- Fundamentals of Philosophy (1969)
- Hypothesis and Perception (1970)
- Salvation from Despair, A Reapraisal of Spinoza's Philosophy (1973)
- Perceptual Assurance and the Reality of the World (1974)
- The Problem of Evil (1977)
- Atheism and Theism (1977)
- An Interpretation of the Logic of Hegel (1983)
- Formal, Transcendental and Dialectical Thinking (1987)
- The Reality of Time (1988)
- Cosmos and Anthropos (1991)
- Cosmos and Theos (1992)
- One World or None (1993)
- The Spirit of Hegel (1993)
- The Substance of Spinoza (1995)
- Apocalypse and Paradigm (2000)
- Earth Federation Now! (2005)
- Reflections on the Problem of Consciousness (2006)

Harris is also the author of over ninety published articles and chapters of books, the earliest of which appeared in 1936.

=== As editor and co-editor ===
- Descartes's Rules for the Direction of the Mind by Harold Joachim (reconstructed from notes taken by his students – Prof. Joachim was formerly Wykeham Professor of Logic at the University of Oxford)
- Towards Genuine Global Governance : Critical Reactions to 'Our Global Neighborhood' (co-editor with James A. Yunker)
- The History of Philosophy from Descartes to Hegel by Arthur Ritchie Lord (co-edited, with commentaries and annotations, with William Sweet)
- A Reprint Edition of 'The Principles of Politics' by Arthur Ritchie Lord, Together with a Critical Assessment (co-edited, with commentaries and annotations, with William Sweet)
- Foundational Problems in Philosophy by Arthur Ritchie Lord (co-edited, with commentaries and annotations, with William Sweet)

=== As co-translator ===
Ideas for a Philosophy of Nature by Friedrich Wilhelm Joseph von Schelling. (co-translator with Prof. Peter Heath)
