= C. A. Campbell =

Scottish philosopher (1897–1974)

Charles Arthur Campbell
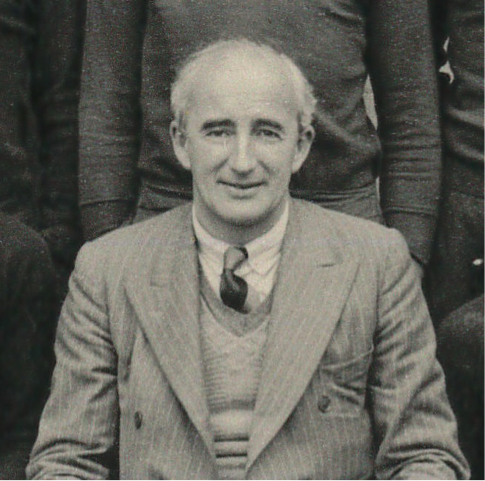
- Campbell on the rugby pitch at the University of Wales, Bangor.
- Born: 13 January 1897; Glasgow, Scotland, United Kingdom of Great Britain and Ireland
- Died: 17 March 1974 (aged 77); Callander, Perthshire, Scotland, United Kingdom

Education
- Education: D.Litt.: Balliol College, Oxford
- Doctoral advisor: Henry Jones

Philosophical work
- Era: 20th-century philosophy
- Region: Western philosophy
- School: British idealism
- Institutions: University of Glasgow, Bangor University
- Main interests: Metaphysics, ethics, rhetoric

Charles Arthur Campbell (13 January 1897 – 17 March 1974) was a Scottish metaphysical philosopher.

== Biography ==
C.A. Campbell was born in Glasgow on 3 January 1897. He attended secondary school at the Glasgow Academy and continued to the University of Glasgow where he earned a Bachelor's degree in philosophy. He then entered the Balliol College in Oxford, where would eventually achieve a Doctor of Letters. The First World War began during his time at Oxford, and he set aside his studies to serve as an officer in the British Army, with the 10th Borders Regiment.

Campbell was invalided out of the army (medically discharged) in 1917, and in 1924 he returned to the University of Glasgow as an assistant lecturer of moral philosophy, where he was given his Doctor of Letters following the 1931 publication of his first book, Scepticism and Construction. Between 1932 and 1938, he served as a professor of philosophy at the University College of North Wales in Bangor. After this, he returned to the University of Glasgow as a professor of logic and rhetoric, a title he held until 1961.

Between 1953 and 1954 Campbell gave his first Gifford Lecture at the University of St. Andrews, followed by another, which ran from 1954 to 1955. These lectures were compiled and released as his second publication, a book called On Selfhood and Godhood. In 1964, he was appointed Dean of Faculties at the University of Glasgow; a position he resigned from in 1966. In 1967 he released his third and final publication, entitled In Defense of Freewill. Campbell died in Callender, Perthshire, on 17 March 1974.

== Philosophical work ==
Campbell was generally associated with the philosophical school of British Idealism, his philosophy having been strongly influenced by the writing of F.H. Bradley, one of British Idealism's pioneering figures. Unlike Bradley, Campbell supported the concept of free will, and this side of his work, most clearly outlined in his final book In Defence of Free Will, remains well circulated. Despite the lasting popularity of these findings, Campbell himself seems to have considered his writing on the topic of human cognition and its relationship to a 'suprarational', non-physical reality to be of equal importance; work which set the stage for his subsequent discussion of the will. It is on these former topics which he presented a pair of Gifford Lectures later compiled as the book On Selfhood and Godhood.

=== Campbell's view of the self ===
Campbell was a metaphysical pluralist who believed the world to be made up of many independently real things. This was an important way in which his work diverged from the teachings of Bradley, whose philosophy is generally regarded as a version of monism. Monism is a predominantly fatalist doctrine which does not tend to treat individual motivation as anything more than an illusion, claiming that everything – including our sense of self and an environment we perceive to be external – exists as part of a single supreme being. Bradley and many other idealist philosophers call this supreme being the 'absolute'. While Campbell believed in a form of the absolute he called the 'suprarational,' he did not agree that each part of this greater whole was directly conjoined to every other in a way which disallowed independent movement. This deviation allowed Campbell to embrace the concept of free will later in his career, a step Bradley refused to take based on his belief in the interconnectedness of all things. Campbell expresses the ideas which support this stance most clearly in the Gifford Lecture later published as On Selfhood and Godhood, which begins in a study of human cognition.

In On Selfhood and Godhood, Campbell gave a description of the self as an innate feature of human beings. He used two different terms to explain a feeling of individuality seemingly persistent to all humans: the 'substantival self' and the character. Campbell discussed the substantival self as something core to each person which determines their actions prior to the engagement of rational thought. This view echoes Aristotle's description of the soul as an indivisible kind of non-physical substance, as found in his Categories. To Campbell, the substantival self is the part of us that remains stable in the face of change, allowing us to remain the same as other less fundamental features are altered. The part of us that can be altered is what Campbell refers to as our character, which can also be roughly thought of as our personality.

Through the substantival self's experience of the world, we develop manners of being which can be referred to in universal terms: one can be kind, for example, though this can change over time if they are treated in a way which encourages them to be more callous in their social interactions. These habits develop through experience and form the character, which grants us the ability to influence an environment defined by the common values that determine the state of natural things. Someone who can be kind has more mobility in the social world, for example, just as a rounder rock will roll faster down a hill than a more angular one of similar size.

=== Campbell's view of the self as a metaphysical entity ===
Campbell's view that we develop the characters which grant us influence in the world through engagement with it resembles David Hume's (a famously anti-metaphysical philosopher) claim that the self is nothing more than a 'bundle of perceptions', or ways of understanding and interacting with the world derived solely from sensory experience. Revealed in this similarity, however, is a key contradiction between the work of Campbell and Hume. Hume considered one's experience of having a character composed as a bundle of perceptions to be the only thing responsible for our feeling of individuality. Without some internal locus for experiences, the self becomes something of an illusion, or at the very least a collection of accidental qualities determined from outside the individual. While such a character would be unique to an individual as something determined circumstantially – having occurred in a specific time and place – Hume's view of the self eschews any discussion of the individual as unique in their own right, before they are determined by quantifiable experience.

Campbell supported his belief in the substantival self by calling it absurd to suggest – as Hume did – that the character is formed solely by our experience of the world as provided by sensory perception, with no input from any kind of pre-rational self. This, he argued, is fundamentally counterintuitive, as perception is generally understood to be an act whereby a perceiver perceives something, and must begin with them directing their attention towards the object of their perception. To imply that our characters are entirely determined by our experiences implies that our minds are wholly passive in the process of cognition, and that the objects of our perception are somehow acting on us so as to appear as concepts in our minds. Campbell made the comparison between Hume's view that the mind is passive and Plato's theory of the forms, which claims that the world is made up of non-physical values called forms, which accumulate as perceivable objects seemingly of their own volition. This is the kind of agency sense datum would need to have were the mind passive, and the comparison to Plato is piercing because Plato's philosophy is considered one of the earliest metaphysical doctrines, stating that the forms exist as non-physical determinants of the perceivable world. Discussion of non-physical entities is the kind of thought Hume made a strong habit of rejecting.

Believing that it was patently illogical to assume that the sense datum responsible for our development of character could plant themselves in our consciousness from the outside, Campbell supported his view of the substantival self by claiming that it plays an active role necessary to our cognition. He thought that its role was to discern between things, and that without this internal capacity to make distinctions between the objects of our perception, we would be overwhelmed by raw sensory input. If one cannot recognise a difference between colours, they all look the same, for example. The same is true for shapes, scale, speed, and so on. Our consciousness and our ability to form conceptual understandings of the world seemingly relies on our ability to make judgements between things, and Campbell referred to this explanation as the 'judgement theory of cognition' (the concept of judgement as a trait indicative of an innate human feature had also been discussed by idealist philosophers prior to Campbell, including Bradley). The source of this ability would have to be itself uninfluenced by external circumstances and so could not have come from outside of us, making it a non-materially determined metaphysical entity.

=== Campbell's view of the self in relation to an absolute reality ===
While Campbell did not ascribe to Bradley's belief in an absolute reality which determines the course of all physical and non-physical activity, he did maintain a belief in a form of the absolute he called the 'suprarational': an objective non-physical reality which is the ultimate subject of our cognition, and which contains the ordering principles (time, shape, etc.) we access in order to understand and manipulate our material environment. He believed that we have access to these principles because the indivisible substantival self exists as a will, or volition, of the being responsible for creating them.

Campbell refers to this being as God, though he believed that because the creator of the world would have to be a pure self, with no physical component, no collection of universal concepts designed to facilitate an understanding of the physical world (such as language) would be sufficient to describe it. This is because the creator of these principles would have to transcend all difference, existing outside a world defined by contradictory values which can be mentally conceptualised and are therefore accessible to rational thought.

=== Campbell's defence of free will ===
Campbell's belief in a being determinate of everything accessible to our rational thought might cause his philosophy to appear monistic (see above), although unlike many followers of F.H. Bradley, he maintained a view that humans possess agency—a trait definable as the ability to determine one's own actions independently of their natural environment, and without direct influence from a supreme being. This is a view Campbell maintained despite believing that our ability to conceptualise and alter things in the physical world exists because the substantival self is a volition of a supreme being. This view that our innate faculties for self-expression come about because our selves are reflections of the absolute also features in Bradley's idealism, however, Bradley called free will a "lingering chimera", because his belief in the total interconnectedness of all things would make impossible any deviation from the plan of a supreme being responsible for creating them. In making a decision, one would either be influenced by desires of the character, as formed through interaction with a physical world created by a supreme being, or would be more directly empowered by the supreme being to overcome these baser desires.

Campbell disagreed with Bradley's brand of metaphysical determinism, referring to two categories of causation: 'agent' and 'event' causation. Event causation is the only kind of causation accepted by Bradley, and refers to any situation where one's actions are defined by a pre-determined causal chain. If one person stumbles into another, for example, and that person pushes a third in an attempt to recover, that second person cannot reasonably be said to have chosen to push the third person. Bradley's philosophy is determinist because it suggests that everything we do occurs this way; that the course of all action is already determined according to the will of an absolute being. Even if a person believes that they are pushing someone intentionally, Bradley would suggest that the force of that intention was provided by the absolute. Campbell however, believed that one person could choose actions of their own accord, using a capacity for independent thought resulting in movement, or agent causation. Campbell believed that we have the freedom to make moral decisions, and that when we resist other reasons to act, and instead act according to a sense of duty, we are exercising this faculty for agent causation which Bradley only considered available to a supreme being.

This resistance of physically determined temptation comes as a result of what Campbell called an 'effort of will,' whereby we prioritise a moral impulse of the self over desires of the character, which are often far stronger and provide what he calls as a 'path of least resistance' for the resulting action. He believed that it was entirely up to us when we engaged in this effort, and that we can refer to our experience of having done so as introspective evidence that we were, at those times, legitimately torn between two options and made the choice to engage in an effort of will and carry out the morally righteous action when we could have very easily done otherwise.

== Publications ==
- Campbell, C.A. Scepticism and Construction. George Allen & Unwin LTD, 1931.
- Campbell, C.A. On Selfhood and Godhood. George Allen & Unwin LTD, 1957.
- Campbell, C.A. In Defence of Free Will. George Allen & Unwin LTD, 1967.
