= MacLehose =

MacLehose may refer to:

== People ==
- Agnes Maclehose (1758–1841), "Clarinda", Scottish poet and socialite
- Christopher MacLehose (born 1940), British publisher
- Murray MacLehose, Baron MacLehose of Beoch (1917–2000), British diplomat, Governor of Hong Kong

== Other ==
- James MacLehose and Sons, a 19th-century Scottish printer and publisher
- MacLehose Medical Rehabilitation Centre, a hospital in Hong Kong
- MacLehose Press, an imprint of London-based publisher Quercus
- MacLehose Trail, a 100-kilometre (62 mi) hiking trail in Hong Kong
