= John Alexander Smith =

British idealist philosopher (1863–1939)

- Born: 21 April 1863; Dingwall, Scotland
- Died: 19 December 1939 (aged 76); Oxford, England

Education
- Education: University of Edinburgh; Balliol College, Oxford
- Academic advisors: Edward Caird; R. L. Nettleship

Philosophical work
- Era: 19th-century philosophy
- Region: Western philosophy
- School: British idealism
- Institutions: University of Oxford
- Notable students: Errol E. Harris; Herbert James Paton
- Main interests: Ethics
- Notable ideas: Spiritual interpretation of history

John Alexander Smith (21 April 1863 – 19 December 1939) was a British idealist philosopher, who was the Jowett Lecturer of philosophy at Balliol College, Oxford from 1896 to 1910, and Waynflete Professor of Moral and Metaphysical Philosophy, carrying a Fellowship at Magdalen College in the same university, from 1910 to 1935.

== Life and work ==
Smith was educated at Inverness Academy, the Edinburgh Collegiate School, Edinburgh University (where he was Ferguson classical scholar in 1884), and at Balliol College, Oxford, to which he was admitted as Warner exhibitioner and honorary scholar in Hilary term 1884. His most visible accomplishments were his work with William David Ross on a 12-volume translation of Aristotle, and his Gifford Lectures for 1929–1931 on the Heritage of Idealism, which were never published.

The 'Moral' tag in his Professorial title disappeared with R. G. Collingwood's appointment in 1935. Smith expressed some unease about the combination of 'moral' and 'metaphysical' in his inaugural lecture Knowing and Acting: The framer of the Chair's regulations, he remarks, describes the Professor's duties 'in a way which rather sets a problem than furnishes guidance. The Professor, he says, 'shall lecture and give instruction on the principles and history of Mental Philosophy, and on its connexion with Ethics.' He distinguishes two great departments of philosophical thought — so recognizedly different as already to be assigned for separate treatment to two other Professors in the University — and he enjoins that they shall be afresh discussed in their connexion with one another, yet with respect to their distinction. It can scarcely be his meaning that his Professor should attempt the invidious task of harmonising the possibly divergent accounts given of Logic by the Wykeham Professor and of Ethics by Whyte's Professor, of performing in public the higher synthesis of his colleagues' several contributions to philosophic truth, or — less arrogantly — of indicating or reinforcing their latent consonance. Such a task, had it been required or suggested, I could not have undertaken.'

Smith interpreted the requirements of his professorship as metaphysical, though he is often referred to as simply a Professor of Moral Philosophy as in Alastair Horne's biography of Harold Macmillan (1894–1986): '... he [Macmillan] recalled the words with which his Professor of Moral Philosophy, J.A. Smith, had opened a lecture course in 1914: 'Nothing that you will learn in the course of your studies will be of the slightest possible use to you in after life – save only this – if you work hard and diligently you should be able to detect when a man is talking rot, and that, in my view, is the main, if not the sole, purpose of education.

Smith's early and perhaps predominant interests were literary and philological, as he makes clear in Contemporary British Philosophy, Second Series, ed. J.H. Muirhead, London: George Allen & Unwin, 1925:228. At the turn of the twentieth century he espoused a form of realism but by the time of his appointment to the Waynflete Professorship had come strongly under the sway of the Italian philosopher, Benedetto Croce (1866–1952). The philosophy of Giovanni Gentile (1875–1944) later exerted a powerful influence.

== Creation of PPE ==
Smith played an innovative part in the institution of the Philosophy, Politics and Economics (PPE) degree at the University of Oxford.

'In 1910, [Gilbert] Murray had ... to preside over a committee to discuss the possibility of instituting a new final 'schools' to cover part of the Greats [Literae Humaniores] ground. The main proponent of the innovation was J.A. Smith, the idiosyncratic and combative Waynflete Professor of Philosophy. He argued with Murray over 'Greats without Greek', i.e. not for a reform of the Greats school but for the institution of a new Greekless final course for philosophy students). Why should all students wanting to study philosophy have to do so within the classical framework? Plato and Aristotle in good translations should give the aspiring philosopher all that he needed - why should he have to bother with often very difficult language? 'Greats without Greek' would reduce the upper-class flavour of Oxford by opening a respectable philosophy school to students who did not come from the great Greek-teaching public schools. There was heat on either side of the debate, not perhaps greatly reduced by Smith, who wrote to Murray, 'except in opinion, I am sure we do not differ'

The plans for a new school, interrupted by the 1914-18 war and much internal wrangling before and after, finally led in 1920 to the establishment of the Final Honour School of Philosophy, Politics and Economics

Smith's role in the emergence of the final scheme, which extended beyond his original idea, is not clear but he evidently felt free to philosophise on economics, one of the new school's components. Lionel (Lord) Robbins, a lecturer in economics at New College in the mid-1920s, was not impressed. In his Autobiography he reflected ruefully that discussions of Modern Greats:

'... tended to be swamped by the then ruling school of philosophers, a race of men who were all too apt to assume that their own discipline gave them spiritual jurisdiction over all, or nearly all, others, regardless of their degree or relevant technical qualification - to hear, for instance, J.A. Smith, Waynflete Professor of Moral Philosophy (sic) pontificating on the methodology of economics, with which his acquaintance was zero, was to gain new conceptions of human absurdity.

Robbins had a point. In Sir Roy Harrod's The Prof, London: Macmillan, 1959: 18–21, there is a sharply observed if unsympathetic account of Smith's contribution to a debate on relativity theory with F.A. Lindemann, then Dr Lee's Professor of Experimental Philosophy [Physics] at Oxford, shortly after the First World War. Smith endeavoured to prove that the theory was false.

== Biographies ==
There is a good account of Smith's life and career in Sir David Ross' entry in the Dictionary of National Biography, 1931–40 (Oxford: OUP). See also Mabbott, J.D. Oxford Memories. Thornton, 1986, p. 74; and Ayer, A.J. Part of My Life. Collins, 1977, pp. 77, 144, 152. A.N. Wilson's biography of C.S. Lewis, a colleague of Smith's at Magdalen, makes reference to Smith (Wilson, A.N C.S. Lewis: A Life. Collins, 1990, p. 102) as does Lewis' voluminous published correspondence. For personal glimpses: Buchan, John Memory Hold-the-Door. Hodder & Stoughton, 1940, p. 49; Jones, L.E An Edwardian Youth, Macmillan, 1956; Scott, D. A.D. Lindsay. Basil Blackwell, 1971: 41, 43, 45, 51, 52, 113; Barker, Sir Ernest Age and Youth. Oxford University Press,1953, p. 319; Matheson, P.E. The Life of Hastings Rashdall. Oxford University Press, 1928, pp. 127, 221; Jones, Sir Henry & Muirhead, J.H. The Life and Philosophy of Edward Caird. Thoemmes, 1991, pp. 156–7; Joliffe, J. Raymond Asquith: Life and Letters. Collins, 1980, p. 90.

A different side of Smith's personality from that experienced by Lionel Robbins was seen by A.D. Lindsay (Master of Balliol 1924-49):

'On Saturday night I was in J.A.. Smith's room playing bridge with him and Cyril Bailey ... and an undergraduate whose name I didn't catch but who looked very nice and beautiful - there-and-back flannel collar with a gold safety-pin - that sort of thing. A head appears around the door. J.A. says, "Well?" "Oh I just looked in to see if you were doing anything" - and five more beautiful young men stroll in and lie about in chairs or prepare drinks for the whole party, making genial remarks on everyone's play and called the venerable J.A. "J.A."'.

For philosophical assessments, see Coates, A. A Sceptical Examination of Contemporary British Philosophy. Brentano's, 1929, pp. 163–87; and Patrick, James The Magdalen Metaphysicals. Mercer University Press, pp. 47–75. In Sir Roy Harrod's The Prof, London: Macmillan, 1959: 18–21, there is a sharply observed if unsympathetic account of Smith's contribution to a debate on relativity theory with F.A. Lindemann, then Dr Lee's Professor in Experimental Philosophy [Physics] at Oxford, shortly after the First World War.

== Cultural references ==
Smith was the subject of a clerihew which acquired some currency at Oxford:

"J. A. Smith

Said Christianity was a myth;
When he grew calmer

They sent for Mr Palmer."

The reference to 'Mr Palmer' is to the Reverend Edwin Palmer (1824–95), Corpus Professor Latin at Oxford, 1870–95; formerly Fellow of Balliol College.

== Publications ==
- Knowing and acting: an inaugural lecture delivered before the University of Oxford, 26th November 1910 (1st ed.), Oxford: Oxford University Press, 1910, Wikidata Q26233775
- 'Introduction' to The Ethics of Aristotle, tr. D. P. Chase, London : J.M. Dent & Sons, 1911, vii-xxviii. Erratum : on xiii, 13 lines from bottom 'man' should read 'main'.
- 'On Feeling', Proceedings of the Aristotelian Society, XIV, 1913–14, 49–75.
- 'General Relative Clauses in Greek', The Classical Review, 31, 1917, 69–71.
- 'Progress as an Ideal of Action', Progress and History, ed. F.S. Marvin, London: Oxford University Press, 1921, 295-314.
- 'Progress in Philosophy', Progress and History, ed. F.S. Marvin, London: Oxford University Press, 1921, 273-294.
- 'The Contribution of Greece and Rome', The Unity of Western Civilization, 2nd. ed., ed. F.S. Marvin, London: Oxford University Press, 1922, 69-90.
- Review of T.L. Heath, A History of Greek Mathematics, The Classical Review, 37, 1923, 69–71.
- The Nature of Art, Oxford, 1924.
- 'Philosophy As the Development of the Notion and Reality of Self-Consciousness', Contemporary British Philosophy: Second Series, ed. J.H. Muirhead, London: George Allen & Unwin, 1925, 227–244.
- Foreword, Syed Zafarul Hasan, Realism, Cambridge, 1928. On Hasan
- 'Artificial Languages', Society for Pure English, Tract XXXIV, Oxford, 1930, 469–77.
- Translation of Aristotle, de Anima. W.D. Ross ed.The Works of Aristotle III. Oxford University Press, 1931.

=== Attributed authorship ===
- Wanted ! A New School at Oxford, Oxford, 1909. Robert Currie tentatively attributes to Smith this pamphlet, which proposes 'a modern-side Greats, based on philosophy' similar to the event of the school of Philosophy, Politics and Economics (PPE) founded in 1920. See Currie, R. 'The Arts and Social Studies, 1914–1939', The History of the University of Oxford, v. VIII, The Twentieth Century, ed. Harrison, B. Clarendon Press, 1995, 112.

=== Archive material ===
A small quantity of Smith's papers is held at Balliol College, Oxford; the main body is archived at Magdalen College, Oxford.
