= Harold H. Joachim =

British idealist philosopher (1868–1938)

Harold H. Joachim FBA
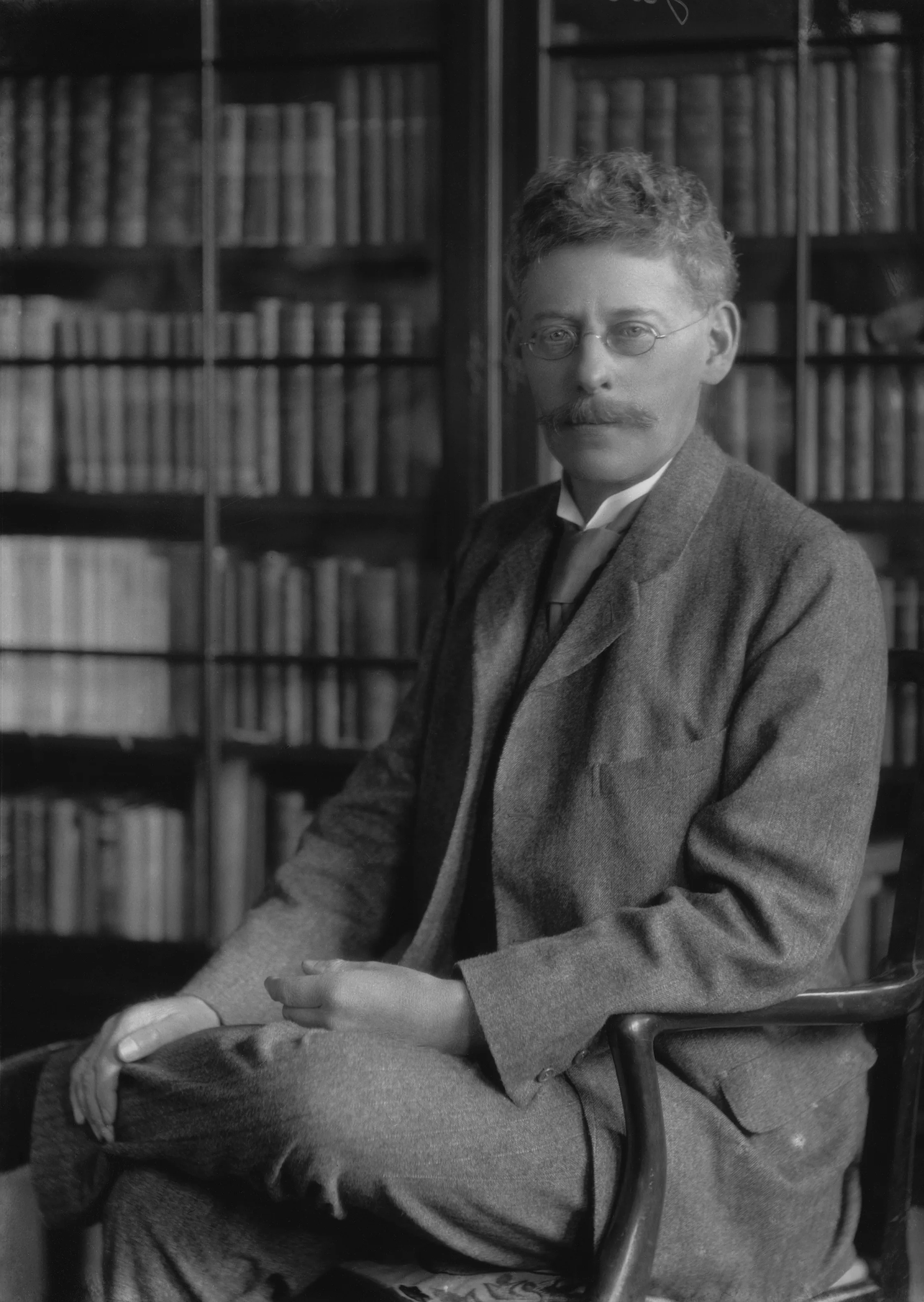
- Joachim in 1927
- Born: Harold Henry Joachim; 28 May 1868; London, England
- Died: 30 July 1938 (aged 70); Croyde, Devon, England

Education
- Education: Balliol College, Oxford
- Academic advisor: R. L. Nettleship

Philosophical work
- Era: 19th-century philosophy
- Region: Western philosophy
- School: British idealism
- Institutions: University of St Andrews; Merton College, Oxford
- Notable students: J. L. Austin; Brand Blanshard; T. S. Eliot; Errol E. Harris
- Main interests: Epistemology
- Notable ideas: Coherence theory of truth

Harold Henry Joachim (/ˈdʒoʊəkɪm/; 28 May 1868 – 30 July 1938) was a British idealist philosopher. A disciple of Francis Herbert Bradley, whose posthumous papers he edited, Joachim is now identified with the later days of the British idealist movement. He is generally credited with the definitive formulation of the coherence theory of truth, in his book The Nature of Truth (1906). He was also a scholar of Aristotle and Spinoza.

== Life ==
Harold Henry Joachim was born in London, the son of a wool merchant who had come to England as a young man from Hungary. He was educated at Harrow School and Balliol College, Oxford, where he was a pupil of R. L. Nettleship. He was elected to a Prize Fellowship at Merton College in 1890, and in 1892 became a philosophy lecturer at the University of St Andrews. Returning to Oxford in 1894, he was lecturer at Balliol until becoming a Fellow and Tutor at Merton in 1897. In 1907 he married his first cousin, a daughter of the violinist Joseph Joachim. He became Wykeham Professor of Logic of the University of Oxford from 1919, succeeding the realist John Cook Wilson, and occupied the chair until his death. Whilst at Oxford he taught the American poet T.S. Eliot. Joachim was a nephew of the great 19th Century violinist Joseph Joachim, and was himself a talented amateur violinist.

== Legacy ==
The coherence theory is nowadays viewed as part of a class of theories called robust or inflationary accounts of truth. In this class, it is a rival to the correspondence and the pragmatist theories. Both Bertrand Russell, arguing for the former, and William James, arguing for the latter, cited Joachim's text as a paradigm of what they thought was wrong about the coherence theory.

== Works ==
- Study of the Ethics of Spinoza (Ethica Ordine Geometrico Demonstrata) (1901)
- The Nature of Truth (1906)
- Aristotle's De lineis insecabilibus (1908) translator
- The Platonic Distinction Between 'True' and 'False' Pleasures and Pains article in Philosophical Review September 1911, Volume XX, pages 471 to 497
- Immediate Experience and Mediation (1919)
- Aristotle on Coming-To-Be & Passing-Away (De Generatione et Corruptione) (1922; reprinted 1999)
- Logical Studies (1948)
- Aristotle: The Nicomachean Ethics: A Commentary, edited by D A Rees (1951)
- Descartes's Rules for the Direction of the Mind (1957), edited from notes by John Austin and Errol Harris

He was probably involved, if uncredited, in the editing of Bradley's collected works, including the Collected Essays with Bradley's sister Marian de Glehn, and Ethical Studies.
