= George Paxton Young =

Canadian philosopher (1818–1889)

- Born: 9 November 1818; Berwick-upon-Tweed, England
- Died: 26 February 1889 (aged 70); Toronto, Canada

Education
- Education: University of Edinburgh

Philosophical work
- Era: Contemporary philosophy
- Region: Western philosophy
- School: Canadian idealism
- Institutions: University of Toronto
- Main interests: Boolean algebra, quintic equations, Abelian functions

George Paxton Young (9 November 1818 – 26 February 1889) was a Canadian philosopher and professor of logic, metaphysics and ethics at the University of Toronto. He studied the quintic polynomial equation and in 1888 described how to solve a solvable quintic equation, without providing an explicit formula.

== George Paxton Young Memorial Prize ==
The Department of Philosophy at the University of Toronto grants the George Paxton Young Memorial Prize annually to students who read a refereed philosophy paper at an international, national or regional philosophy conference.
