= Canadian idealism =

Philosophical tradition

Canadian idealism is a Canadian philosophical tradition that stemmed from British idealism.

== History ==
=== People ===
The early idealists include George Paxton Young (1818–1889) who began teaching at Knox College in 1851, Samuel Dyde (1862–1947), and John Watson (1847–1939) who began teaching at Queen's University in 1872. In the early 20th century, one finds Rupert Lodge (1886–1961), from the University of Manitoba, John Macdonald (1888–1972), from the University of Alberta, and Jacob Gould Schurman (1854–1942), born in Prince Edward Island, and who taught at Acadia, Dalhousie, and Cornell universities. More recent idealists include the philosophers George Grant (1918–1988), Leslie Armour (1931–2014), and Charles Taylor (born 1931). James Doull (1918–2001) also developed Hegelian idealist tenets among Canadians including a philosophy of history and freedom.

=== Impact ===
==== Religion ====
In addition to the impact of idealism on Canadian political philosophy, there was a significant influence on religion in Canada, and a number of the figures who advocated for and were involved in the creation of the United Church of Canada, such as S.W. Dyde, T.B. Kilpatrick, and John Watson were followers of idealist philosophy.

==== Politics ====
Upon reading Canadian Idealism and the Philosophy of Freedom, former Leader of the Opposition, and former leader of the New Democratic Party, Jack Layton has described how much it influenced his thinking.

== Pillars ==
There are three pillars to this philosophy.

The first pillar is the response to the materialism of the Enlightenment. Idealists argue that the scientific reason of the Enlightenment artificially suppresses a significant dimension of human experience; that is, the cultural framework and historically inherited ideas with which we make sense of the world around us. Idealists hold that knowledge and reason are socially cultivated, not only with our contemporaries but also with our history.

The second pillar is the philosophy of history. For idealists, philosophy includes a study of history. To reflect on what we currently believe we must understand the historical dialogue and the conflict of ideas that has brought us to this point. A wide range of subjects from economic rights to the notion of the family come into consideration, but the central question of idealists is how to reconcile civic unity (or the common good) with individual freedom.

The third pillar is the formulation of a philosophy of freedom. The concept of culturally embedded knowledge and the historical approach to philosophy set the groundwork for idea of freedom as something that is achieved through a commitment to the community rather than in opposition to it, as is the case with the contract theory of Thomas Hobbes and John Locke for whom freedom is the absence of external interference with our choices (negative liberty). Freedom for the idealists is achieved through the ethical life of our community, not despite it. By participating in our society, engaging in dialogues with others about our proper ends, and giving and receiving the recognition of others that we are free, we cultivate the elements that make us self-governing (or autonomous) individuals, and hence truly free (positive liberty).

== See also ==
- C. B. Macpherson (a philosopher influenced by Canadian idealism)
