= Henry Jones (philosopher) =

Welsh philosopher and academic (1852–1922)

Sir Henry Jones
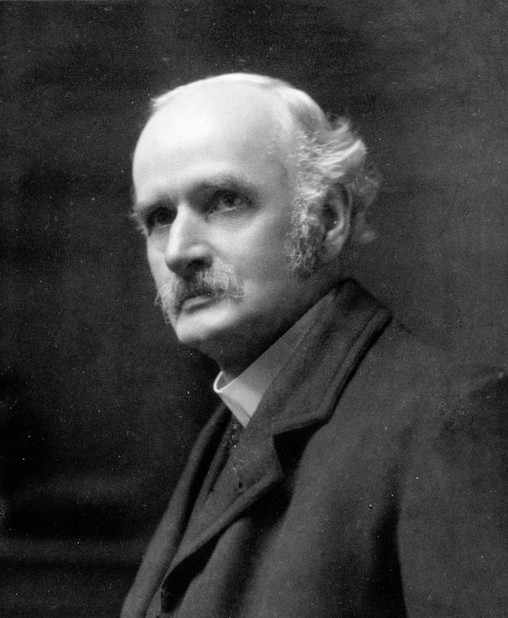
- Born: 30 November 1852; Llangernyw, Denbighshire, Wales, UK
- Died: 4 February 1922 (aged 69)

Education
- Education: University of Glasgow

Philosophical work
- Era: 19th-century philosophy
- Region: Western philosophy
- School: British idealism
- Institutions: University College, Aberystwyth University College of North Wales, Bangor University of Glasgow
- Main interests: Political philosophy

Sir Henry Jones, CH, FBA (30 November 1852 – 4 February 1922) was a Welsh philosopher and academic.

== Biography ==
Jones was born in Llangernyw, Denbighshire, now in Conwy County Borough, the son of a shoemaker. After working as an apprentice to his father, he studied at Bangor Normal College and became a teacher at Brynamman. Having decided to enter the Presbyterian ministry, he went to the University of Glasgow on a scholarship. After graduating, he obtained a fellowship, and went on to study at Oxford and in Germany. In 1882 he married Annie Walker, a Scotswoman, and later returned to live in Scotland.

Jones was appointed a lecturer at the University College, Aberystwyth, in 1882, before becoming a professor at the University College of North Wales, Bangor in 1884. In 1894, he became Professor of Moral Philosophy at the University of Glasgow, where he remained until 1922.

A Liberal and a friend of David Lloyd George, he was instrumental in the passing of the Welsh Intermediate Education Act 1889, and worked for the establishment of the University of Wales and the introduction of a penny rate for education.

He was knighted in 1912 and was appointed Member of the Order of the Companions of Honour in 1922, shortly before his death.

The Sir Henry Jones Memorial Prize (for moral philosophy), founded in 1934, is awarded annually in October.

== Family ==
By his wife Annie, Jones had two daughters and four sons. A son and daughter died in youth. All their three surviving children fought in the First World War, the youngest of whom, Lieutenant Arthur Meredydd Jones, MC, was killed on active service in France. Another son, Captain James Walker Jones, DSO, spent much of his career in Burma. A third son, Lieutenant Elias Henry Jones, also served in Burma and became notorious for his escape from a Turkish prisoner of war camp in 1918.

== Philosophy ==
Jones supported philosophical idealism. His philosophy has been described by Daniel Davies as "essentially Caird's version of Hegelian idealism".

== Works ==
- Browning as a Philosophical and Religious Teacher (1891)
- A Critical Account of the Philosophy of Lotze (1895)
- The Immortality of the Soul in the Poems of Tennyson and Browning the Essex Hall Lecture for 1905 (1907) also online as a PDF file from the Unitarians UK website
- Idealism as a Practical Creed (1909)
- The Working Faith of the Social Reformer: and other essays (1910)
- Social Powers: three popular lectures on the environment, the press and the pulpit (1913)
- The Principles of Citizenship (1919)
- The Life and Philosophy of Edward Caird joint author with J H Muirhead (1921)
- A Faith that Enquires Gifford Lectures (1922)
- Old Memories: An Autobiography edited by Thomas Jones (1923)
- Essays on Literature and Education edited by H J W Hetherington (undated but perhaps 1924).

See also The Life and Letters of Sir Henry Jones by H J W Hetherington (1925) - further information online as a PDF file from Cardiff University website
