= Herbert James Paton =

Scottish philosopher

Herbert James Paton FBA FSA Scot
- Born: 30 March 1887; Abernethy, Scotland
- Died: 2 August 1969 (aged 82); Perth and Kinross, Scotland

Education
- Education: University of Glasgow; Balliol College, Oxford
- Academic advisor: John Alexander Smith

Philosophical work
- Era: 19th-century philosophy
- Region: Western philosophy
- School: British idealism
- Institutions: University of Oxford; University of Glasgow
- Notable students: R. M. Hare
- Main interests: Ethics
- Notable ideas: Truth as existing only for a thinking mind

Herbert James Paton (30 March 1887 – 2 August 1969), usually cited as H. J. Paton, was a Scottish philosopher who taught at various university institutions, including Glasgow and Oxford. He worked in British intelligence during the two world wars and played a diplomatic role on behalf of Poland at the 1919 Versailles conference. In 1968, the year before his death, he published The Claim of Scotland, a plea for a greater general understanding of the constitutional position of his own native country.

== Early life and education ==
Paton was born in Abernethy. He was the son of the Reverend William Macalister Paton and Jean Robertson Millar. He was educated at the High School of Glasgow, the University of Glasgow, and Balliol College, Oxford. At Oxford he gained a First in Classical Moderations, in 1909, and a First in Literae Humaniores ('Greats', a combination of philosophy and ancient history) in 1911.

== Service in the wars ==
During the First World War Paton served in the Admiralty's Intelligence Division, 1914–1919, and became an expert on Polish affairs in which capacity he attended the Versailles conference in 1919. At the Peace Conference he was the brains behind the Curzon Line. Drawn across eastern Poland, the line marked to the west of it what Lord Curzon, the British Foreign Secretary, would guarantee as Poland for the Poles. It was breached by the German-Russian Steel Pact of 28 September 1939, that prevented Russians from assisting Poland.

During the Second World War Paton did government work in the Foreign Research and Press Service (after 1943 the Foreign Office Research Department), 1939–44. He was also a member of the executive committee of the League of Nations Union, 1939–48.

== Academic career ==
From 1911 to 1927 Paton was a fellow and praelector in classics and philosophy at Queen's College, and dean of the college, 1917–22. In 1920 he served as Junior Proctor at Oxford. He spent a sabbatical year in the United States of America, 1926–26, where he was Laura Spelman Rockefeller Research Fellow, University of California. There he wrote his first philosophy book, The Good Will. The year after his return to Oxford he resigned his Queen's Fellowship to take up the post of Professor of Logic and Rhetoric at the University of Glasgow, 1927–37. He returned to Oxford as White's Professor of Moral Philosophy (1937–52), a post which carried with it a Fellowship at Corpus Christi College. He retired from Oxford in 1952 as professor emeritus but was a visiting professor to the University of Toronto in 1955.

Paton was a notable Kantian scholar; in this he abandoned his earlier attraction to the idealist philosophy of Benedetto Croce (1866–1952). His works of Kantian commentary included Kant's Metaphysic of Experience (1936), The Categorical Imperative (1947), and The Moral Law (a translation of Kant's Grundlegung zur Metaphysik der Sitten [Foundations of the Metaphysics of Morals], 1785] (1947). Paton delivered the Gifford Lectures at the University of St Andrews, 1949–50; the lectures were published as The Modern Predicament (1955).

== Cultural politics ==
In his final years Paton published The Claim of Scotland (1968), a considered dissection of national sensitivities between Scotland and England under the Treaty of Union, in which he articulated a robust yet peaceable call for a greater general understanding of Scotland's sovereign rights. The book cites in particular the period in the early 1950s when parliament in London effectively ignored the Scottish Covenant of 1949.

== Personal life ==
Paton married twice, the first time in 1936 to Mary Sheila (d. 1959), daughter of Henry Paul Todd-Naylor. His second marriage was with Sarah Irene (d. 1964), daughter of Professor William Macneile Dixon. He died on August 2, 1969, in Perth and Kinross.

A short philosophical autobiography appears in Contemporary British Philosophy (1956).
