= George F. McLean =

American professor of philosophy (1929 – 2016)

George Francis McLean (June 29, 1929 - September 6, 2016) was a Professor Emeritus at the School of Philosophy of The Catholic University of America (CUA), Washington, D.C., and Director of its Centre for the Study of Culture and Values (CSCV).

He lectured internationally, promoting global philosophical dialogue and cooperation. Likewise, he invited scholars from many countries to participate in seminars in Washington, D.C.

He served as founding President of The Council for Research in Values and Philosophy (RVP) and general editor of its 300 volume publication series, "Cultural Heritage and Contemporary Change".

Professor McLean believed that many philosophical traditions, cultures, and schools seek the truth. His metaphor for this is that these are many roads that converge in “the holy mountain.”

== Works ==
Published in The Council for Research in Values and Philosophy (RVP) series: "Cultural Heritage and Contemporary Change"

Series I. Culture and Values

I.1 Research on Culture and Values: Intersection of Universities, Churches and Nations; George F. McLean, ed. ISBN 0-8191-7353-3 (paper); 081917352-5 (cloth)

I.3 Reading Philosophy for the XXIst Century; George F. McLean, ed. ISBN 0-8191-7415-7 (paper); 0819174149 (cloth)

I.16 Civil Society and Social Reconstruction; George F. McLean, ed. ISBN 1-56518-086-0 (paper)

I.17 Ways to God, Personal and Social, at the Turn of the Millennia: The Iqbal Lectures, Lahore; George F. McLean. ISBN 1-56518-123-9 (paper)

I.20 Faith, Reason and Philosophy: Lectures at The al-Azhar, Qom, Tehran, Lahore and Beijing; Appendix: The Encyclical Letter: Fides et Ratio; George F. McLean. ISBN 1-56518-130-1 (paper)

I.21 Religion and the Cooperation between Civilizations: Islamic and Christian Cultures in a Global Horizon; George F. McLean. ISBN 1-56518-152-2 (paper)

I.22 Freedom, Cultural Traditions and Progress: Philosophy in Civil Society and Nation Building, Tashkent Lectures, 1999; George F. McLean. ISBN 1-56518-151-4 (paper)

I.29 Persons, Peoples and Cultures in a Global Age: Metaphysical Bases for Peace between Civilizations; George F. McLean. ISBN 1-56518-187-5 (paper)

I.37 Beyond Modernity: The Recovery of Person and Community in Global Times: Lectures in China and Vietnam; George F. McLean. ISBN 978-1-56518-257-8 (paper)

I.38 Religion and Culture; George F. McLean. ISBN 978-1-56518-256-1 (paper)

I.40 Unity and Harmony, Love and Compassion in Global Times; George F. McLean. ISBN 978-1-56518-259-2 (paper)

Series IIA. Islam

IIA.17 Hermeneutics, Faith, and Relations between Cultures: Lectures in Qom, Iran; George F. McLean. ISBN 1-56518-191-3 (paper)

Series III. Asia

III.5 Tradition, Harmony and Transcendence; George F. McLean. ISBN 1-56518-031-3 (paper); 156518030-5 (cloth)

III.19 God and the Discovery of Man: Classical and Contemporary Approaches: Lectures in Wuhan, China; George F. McLean. ISBN 1-56518-189-1 (paper)

IIIB.7 Hermeneutics, Tradition and Contemporary Change: Lectures In Chennai/Madras, India: Indian Philosophical Studies, VII; George F. McLean. ISBN 1-56518-188-3 (paper). 2004

IIIB.8 Plenitude and Participation: The Life of God in Man: Lectures in Chennai/Madras, India; George F. McLean. ISBN 1-56518-199-9 (paper)

IIID.2 Hermeneutics for a Global Age: Lectures in Shanghai and Hanoi; George F. McLean. ISBN 1-56518-190-5 (paper).

== Works on McLean ==
Books Dedicated to Professor George F. McLean on the occasion of his 75th birthday

- To the Mountain: Essays in Honour of Professor George F. McLean; edited by William Sweet and Hu Yeping; Fu Jen Catholic University Press, Taipei, Taiwan; 2004.
- Diversity and Dialogue: Culture and Values in the Age of Globalization: Essays in Honour of Prof. George F. McLean; edited by Andrew Blasco and Plamen Makariev; Minerva, Sofia, Bulgaria; 2004.
- Philosophical Traditions and Contemporary World: Russia-West-East; edited by Nur S. Kirabaev and Yuriy M. Pochta; People's Friendship University of Russia, Moscow, Russia; 2004.
- Prajna Vihara: Journal of Philosophy and Religion (Vol.5 No.1 January–June 2004); Assumption University of Thailand, Bangkok, Thailand; 2004.
- Cultural Heritage and the Future of China; edited by Gan Chensong, Zou Shipeng and Hu Yeping; Jiangxi People's Press, Nanchang, China; 2004.

Books dedicated to Professor George F. McLean on his 80th birthday

- Asian Philosophy in the Making: Essays in Honor of George Francis McLean; edited by Tran Van Doan; Encyclopedia Publishing House, Hanoi, Vietnam; 2009.
- Islam, Cultural Transformation and the Re-emergence of Falsafah: Studies Honoring Professor George Fransic McLean on His Eightieth Birthday; edited with an Introduction by Karim Douglas Crow; Iranian Institute of Philosophy, Tehran, Iran; 2009.
- Philosophy in Times of Social Crisis: Integrity and Dialogue: Essays in Honor of George F. McLean; edited by Plamen Makariev, Andrew Blasko and Dariusz Dobrzanski; Minerva, Sofia, Bulgaria; 2009.
- Christianity, Culture and the Contemporary World: Challenges and New Paradigms: Reflections of International Catholic Thinkers in Honor of George Francis McLean on the Occasion of His 80th Birthday; edited by Edward J. Alam; Notre Dame University, Louaize, Lebanon, 2009.
- 50 Years Anniversary of the Institute of Philosophy, Shanghai Academy of Social Sciences; Shanghai Academy of Social Sciences; Shanghai, China, 2009.
