= William Sweet =

Canadian philosopher (born 1955)

William Sweet FRAS FRHistS FRSC
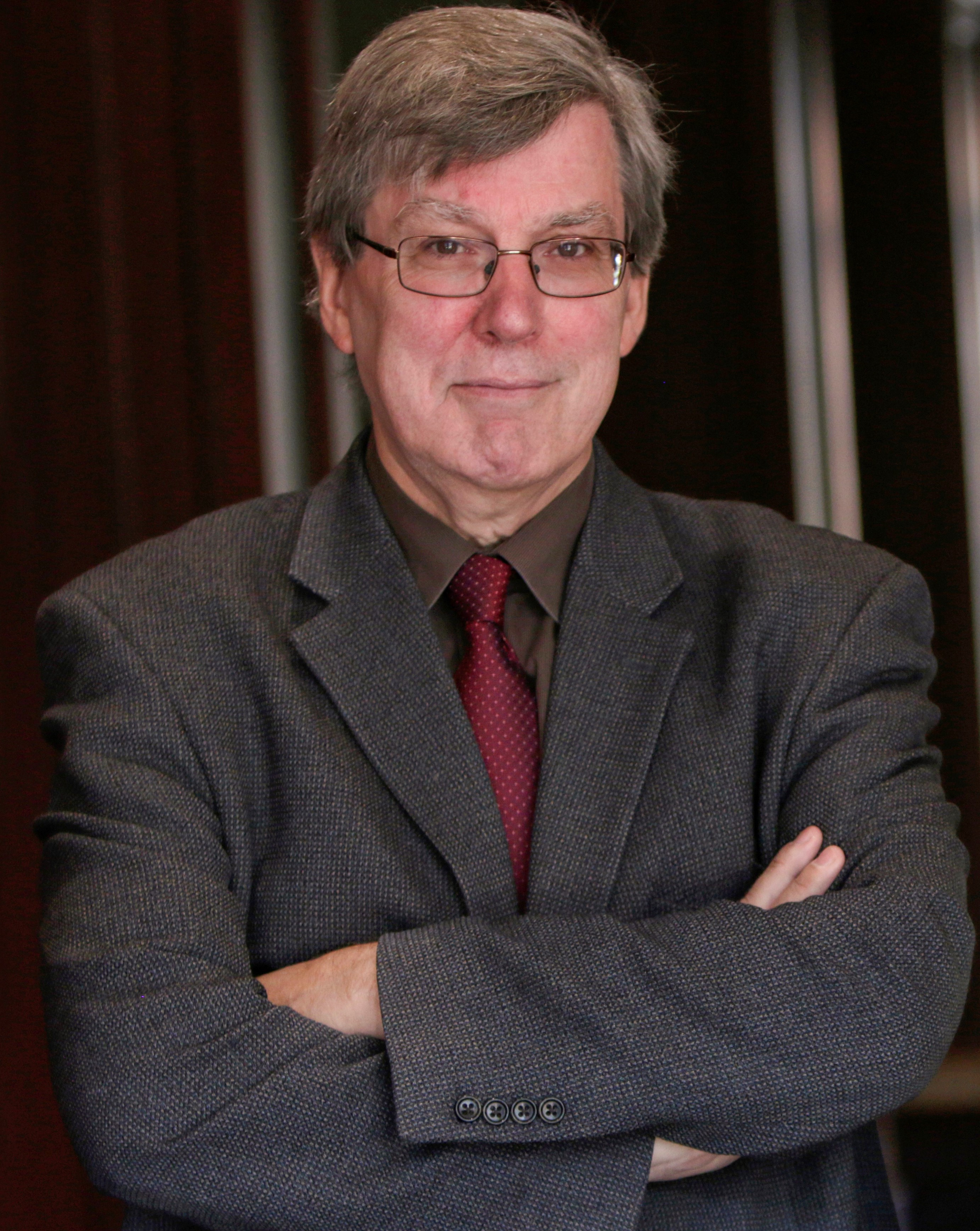
- Born: 1955 (age 70–71); Edmonton, Alberta, Canada
- Occupations: Philosopher and University Professor

William Sweet FRAS FRHistS FRSC (born 1955) is a Canadian philosopher, and a past president of the Canadian Philosophical Association and of the Canadian Theological Society.

== Biography ==
Sweet was born in St. Albert near Edmonton, Alberta, Canada, and studied political science, theology, and philosophy in Canada, South Africa, France, and Germany. He completed a DEA in political science at the Sorbonne at the Université de Paris (with Luc Ferry), a PhD in philosophy at the University of Ottawa, a DTh in systematic theology at the University of South Africa in Pretoria, and a D.Ph. at the Université Saint-Paul. He also studied at Carleton University, the University of Manitoba, the Humboldt-Universität zu Berlin, and the Centre Sèvres (Faculté de Théologie de la Compagnie de Jésus, Paris). He was elected a Fellow of the Royal Historical Society in 2014, and a Fellow of the Royal Society of Canada in 2017. In November 2021, he was elected a permanent member of the Institut international de philosophie.

Sweet specializes in political philosophy (particularly on issues of human rights); the philosophy of religion (e.g., the influence of science and technology on religion and, broadly, epistemology of religion); philosophical and systematic theology; the relation of culture and tradition to philosophical thinking (particularly, comparative Asian and Western philosophy); late 19th and early 20th century Anglo-American Philosophy (particularly, the origins of analytic philosophy and British Idealism); ethical theories and applied ethics (especially, cross-cultural ethics); and the philosophy of Jacques Maritain.

== Academic positions ==
Sweet is Professor of Philosophy and Director of the Centre for Philosophy, Theology, and Cultural Traditions at St Francis Xavier University. He has been also a member of the Faculty of Graduate and Postdoctoral Studies at the University of Ottawa, and serves as an adjunct professor in the graduate programmes of Saint Paul University and of the Collège dominicain de philosophie et de théologie in Ottawa, Canada. Sweet was Professor of Philosophy and Professor of Religious Studies at St Thomas University in Fredericton, New Brunswick, where he served as the Vice President (Academic) from 2007 to 2008. He has also been a visiting professor at the John Paul II Catholic University of Lublin, Poland, Soochow University, Taipei, Fu Jen University, Taipei, and the Dharmaram Vidya Kshetram and the University of Pune, in India.

== Contributions ==
Much of Sweet's work is in the history of modern philosophy, although he uses this as a resource and a vehicle to address contemporary issues in political philosophy, applied ethics, and the philosophy of religion. His early essays as well as his first book focused on the political philosophy of British idealist philosophers of the late 19th and early 20th century, but he has published a number of papers and translations on the personalist tradition in French philosophy, particularly that of Jacques Maritain. Recent research focuses on philosophical debates in the 20th century in South Africa and India, and the phenomenon of the migration of philosophical texts and traditions across cultures.

The focus of several of Sweet's articles and books in political philosophy is the theme of rights and obligations. Much of this has been historical – providing substantial and novel reassessments of British idealists such as Bernard Bosanquet but also of Maritain (who, Sweet argues, converge on a number of significant points). Sweet's view is that these traditions provide a basis for a liberal, but non-individualistic, political philosophy. He gives a brief account of a positive theory of idealist ethics in his Introductory essay to his edited volume on The Moral, Social, and Political Philosophy of the British Idealists (2009) and he defends a broadly Maritainian view of dignity and human rights in a number of recent essays.

Sweet's contributions to the philosophy of religion and philosophical theology are developed over two single authored, one co-authored, and several edited books. Sweet was a student of D.Z. Phillips, and much of his work has been on the epistemology of religion and the nature of religious belief. Sweet argues that much of the debate in the Anglo-American traditions concerning the relation of faith and reason is based on assumptions concerning the meaning and truth of religious beliefs – assumptions which he traces to the early 17th century. Sweet argues that these accounts misrepresent or misunderstand what religious belief is, and that a more accurate account of religious belief (which requires recognizing both the descriptive and expressive character of religious beliefs), and a broadly coherentist theory of truth can be used to address a number of contemporary issues in the philosophy of religion, such as the relation of religion and science.

Sweet travels extensively, and regularly lectures or teaches in East Asia, India, and Western Europe. He has been a major contributor to the international programmes of the Council for Research in Values and Philosophy and of the World Union of Catholic Philosophical Associations and the Istituto Internazionale Jacques Maritain (of which he is Presidente d'onore). He has published a number of books on intercultural philosophy, and was one of the drafters of the 2024 Barletta Declaration

He is the editor of Philosophy, Culture, and Traditions, Etudes maritainiennes/Maritain Studies (1994–2006, 2019 -), and an Editor of Collingwood and British Idealism Studies. He has also been editor of Bradley Studies (2005).

His work has been published in Castilian, Chinese, English, French, Gallego, German, Italian, Persian, Polish, and Vietnamese.

== Major publications ==
- Before and After Democracy, (Leuven, Belgium: Peeters, 2023).
- Philosophy Re-Engaging Cultures and Ways of Life, (with George F. McLean) (Washington, DC, 2022).
- Care of Self and Meaning of Life, (with Cristal Huang) (Washington, DC, 2015).
- What is Intercultural Philosophy?, (Washington, DC: CRVP, 2015).
- Cultural Clash and Religion, (Washington, DC: CRVP, 2014)
- Ideas Under Fire, (with Jonathan Lavery and Louis Groarke) (Fairleigh Dickenson University Press, 2013)
- Philosophy Emerging from Culture, (with Wonbin Park, George F. McLean, and Olivia Blanchette) (CRVP, 2013)
- Migrating Texts and Traditions, (University of Ottawa Press, 2012).
- Responses to the Enlightenment. An Exchange on Foundations, Faith, and Community. (with Hendrik Hart) (Rodopi, 2012)
- Intercultural Dialogue and Human Rights, with Luigi Bonanate and Roberto Papini (CRVP Press, 2011).
- Biographical Encyclopedia of British Idealism (Continuum 2010)
- The Moral, Social and Political Philosophy of the British Idealists (Imprint Academic 2009)
- Rethinking the Role of Philosophy in the Global Age (ed., with Pham Van Duc) (2009)
- The Dialogue of Cultural Traditions (ed., with Tomonobu Imamichi, G.F. McLean, et alii) (2008)
- Religion and the Challenges of Science 92007/2018) [ed. with Richard Feist].
- Bernard Bosanquet and the Legacy of British Idealism (University of Toronto Press, 2007)
- Edition of the Works of Arthur Ritchie Lord (with Errol E. Harris), 3 vols. (with introductions and critical biographies) (2006)
- Philosophy of Religion [Vol. 8, Proceedings of the XXI World Congress of Philosophy, 2003] (2006)
- Approaches to Metaphysics (Kluwer/Springer, 2004)
- Edition of Early Responses to British Idealism, 3 vols. (Bristol: Thoemmes, 2004) [ed. with Carol A. Keene and C. Tyler]
- The Philosophy of History: a re-examination (Ashgate, 2004)
- "To the Mountain": essays in honour of Professor George F. McLean, [ed. with Hu Yeping]
- Religion, Science, and Non-Science (2003)
- Religious Belief: The Contemporary Debate (2003)
- Philosophical Theory and the Universal Declaration of Human Rights (2003)
- Edition of Bernard Bosanquet: Essays in Philosophy and Social Policy, (1883–1922), 3 vols. (with introductions and critical bibliographies) (2003)
- Philosophy, Culture and Pluralism (2002)
- Idealism, Metaphysics, and Community (2001)
- British Idealism and Aesthetics (2001)
- Edition of Bernard Bosanquet's The Philosophical Theory of the State and Related Essays (2001) [ed., with Gerald F. Gaus]
- Edition of Natural Law: reflections on theory and practice, by Jacques Maritain (2001; corrected edition, 2003)
- The Bases of Ethics (2000)
- The Collected Works of Bernard Bosanquet, 20 vols. (with introductions and critical bibliographies) (1999)
- Idealism and Rights: The Social Ontology of Human Rights in the Political Thought of Bernard Bosanquet (1997; paperback 2005).
