= Michael Otsuka =

American philosopher

- Born: Michael H. Otsuka; 1964 (age 61–62); Palo Alto, California, U.S.

Education
- Education: Yale University (BA); Balliol College, Oxford (BPhil, DPhil)
- Thesis: Equality, Neutrality, and Prejudice: A Critique of Dworkin's Liberalism (1989)
- Doctoral advisor: G. A. Cohen

Philosophical work
- Era: Contemporary philosophy
- Region: Western philosophy
- School: Analytic philosophy, left-libertarianism
- Institutions: University of Colorado Boulder; University of California, Los Angeles; University College London; London School of Economics; Rutgers University
- Main interests: Political philosophy, ethics
- Notable works: Libertarianism Without Inequality (2003)
- Notable ideas: Equal opportunity left-libertarianism

Michael H. Otsuka (born 1964) is an American political philosopher and Professor in the Department of Philosophy at Rutgers University known for his work on left-libertarianism. As of 2020, Otsuka politically identifies as a social democrat.

== Career ==
Otsuka earned his Doctor of Philosophy degree in politics from Balliol College, Oxford, under the direction of G. A. Cohen, on a Marshall Scholarship, after graduating from Yale University with a bachelor's degree in political science summa cum laude in 1986.

Prior to moving to the London School of Economics in 2013, Otsuka was Professor of Philosophy at University College London, where he had taught since 1998, and, before that taught at UCLA and the University of Colorado. He joined Rutgers University in September 2022.

== Philosophical work ==
Otsuka has written extensively in political philosophy on topics such as equality and left-libertarianism. Otsuka is a proponent of actual-consent forms of government, in opposition to the mainstream of political theory which has thought such systems to be unworkable. He has also published articles in normative ethics on the morality of harming and saving from harm.

Otsuka also defends what is known as "equal opportunity left-libertarianism", which interprets

the Lockean proviso requiring that one leave enough for others to have an opportunity for well-being that is at least as good as the opportunity for well-being that one obtained in using or appropriating natural resources. Individuals who leave less than this are required to pay the full competitive value of their excess share to those deprived of their fair share.

One of Otsuka's most influential articles—cited and critiqued by Jeff McMahan in his own work The Ethics of Killing—is "Killing the Innocent in Self-Defense" (Philosophy & Public Affairs, 1994) In this article, Otsuka develops what he calls the Moral Equivalence Thesis, according to which Innocent Threat (e.g., the body of Falling Person is about to kill you by crushing you to death but who was thrown off the top of a building by an evil Villain) is on a moral par with Bystander, or one who is not at all responsible for whatever endangers your life. Imagine a javelin is heading toward you and will kill you unless you pull Bystander into its path so it kills Bystander instead. Because it would be morally impermissible to kill Bystander in this way, it would also be morally impermissible for you to kill Falling Person by, say, vaporizing him with a ray gun. Further, it is morally impermissible to kill an Innocent Aggressor, or someone who endangers your life because of her intention to kill you but whose actions are beyond her control. Imagine someone who has been hypnotized and whose aim is to kill you. It is wrong to kill Innocent Aggressor because he is on a moral par with Innocent Threat, who is on a par with Bystander. So, it is wrong to kill Innocent Aggressor because he is on a par, morally, with Bystander.

Otsuka has also written on pensions and argues that collective forms of risk pooling are superior to individual defined contribution accounts because they maximize expected benefits and smooth risks across time and space through fair terms of social cooperation. He argues that we need not appeal to egalitarianism to justify the collective, multi-generational, society-wide provision of age pensions. Instead, he contends that reciprocity and rational efficiency provide compelling reasons to believe that mutual cooperation is in the ex-ante best interests of every individual.

== Bibliography ==
- Libertarianism Without Inequality (2003)
- How to Pool Risks Across Generations: The Case for Collective Pensions (2023)
