= Libertarianism Without Inequality =

2003 book by Michael Otsuka

Libertarianism without inequality
- Author: Michael Otsuka
- Language: English
- Subject: Libertarianism
- Publisher: Oxford University Press
- Publication date: 3 July 2003
- Publication place: United Kingdom
- Pages: 168
- ISBN: 978-0-19-924395-2

Libertarianism Without Inequality is a book written in 2003 by Michael Otsuka, and published by Oxford University Press.

== Synopsis ==
The book is written in three parts with part one being dedicated to self-ownership and "world ownership." Part two dwells on the rights of self-defense and the right to punish those who transgress against the natural rights of others. Part three deals with the political aspects and other types of libertarianism.

== Reception ==
Ian Carter has said, "In this important contribution to rights theory, the deontology of punishment, and the problem of political obligation, Michael Otsuka argues against the belief, prevalent on both the left and the right of the political spectrum, that the fundamental principles of libertarianism conflict with the ideal of economic equality. This allows him to defend “libertarianism without inequality” – a radical and provocative normative construction that is both more egalitarian and more libertarian than mainstream (left-of-centre) liberal egalitarianism."

Rothbardian intellectual historian David Gordon has said, "Michael Otsuka endeavors to combine two fundamental principles of political philosophy, usually considered polar opposites. In my view, his ingenious attempt does not succeed; but his failure has much to teach us." Timothy Hinton has said the book is a notable contribution to political philosophy.

== See also ==
- Left-libertarianism
