= James Lindsay (theologian) =

Scottish minister, theologian and writer

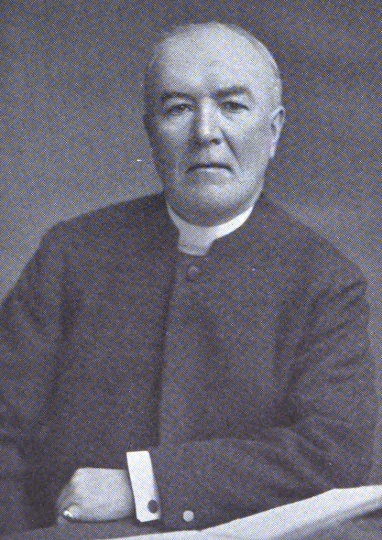
- Born: 1852; Ayrshire
- Died: 25 March 1923 (aged 70–71); Annick Lodge
- Occupations: Minister, theologian

James Lindsay FRSE FGS (1852 – 25 March 1923) was a Scottish minister, theologian and writer.

== Life ==
He was born in Ayrshire in 1852, where his father, John Cowan Lindsay, was headmaster of Kilmarnock Grammar School, where he was later educated. He studied divinity at Glasgow University, graduating MA in 1878. In 1889 he was elected a fellow of the Royal Society of Edinburgh. His proposers were William Thomson, Lord Kelvin, John Gray McKendrick, James Thomson Bottomley, and Sir James David Marwick. He gained a doctorate (DD) in 1899.

In 1908, aged 56, he married a widow, Margaret R. Barclay-Shaw (née Cook). He died at Annick Lodge in Ayrshire on 25 March 1923.

== Theistic idealism ==
Lindsay outlined a theistic idealism in his works starting with Studies in European Philosophy in 1909 and most notably A Philosophical System of Theistic Idealism, published in 1917.

== Selected publications ==
- The Significance of the Old Testament for Modern Theology (1896)
- The Teaching Function of the Modern Pulpit (1897)
- Recent Advances in Theistic Philosophy of Religion (1897)
- Canada: its Commerce, its Colleges and its Churches (1900)
- Studies in European Philosophy (1909)
- The Fundamental Problems of Metaphysics (1910)
- A Philosophical System of Theistic Idealism (1917)
- Seven Theistic Philosophers (1920)
- Autobiography of Rev James Lindsay DD (1924) posthumously published by his wife
