= James MacLehose and Sons =

Scottish company

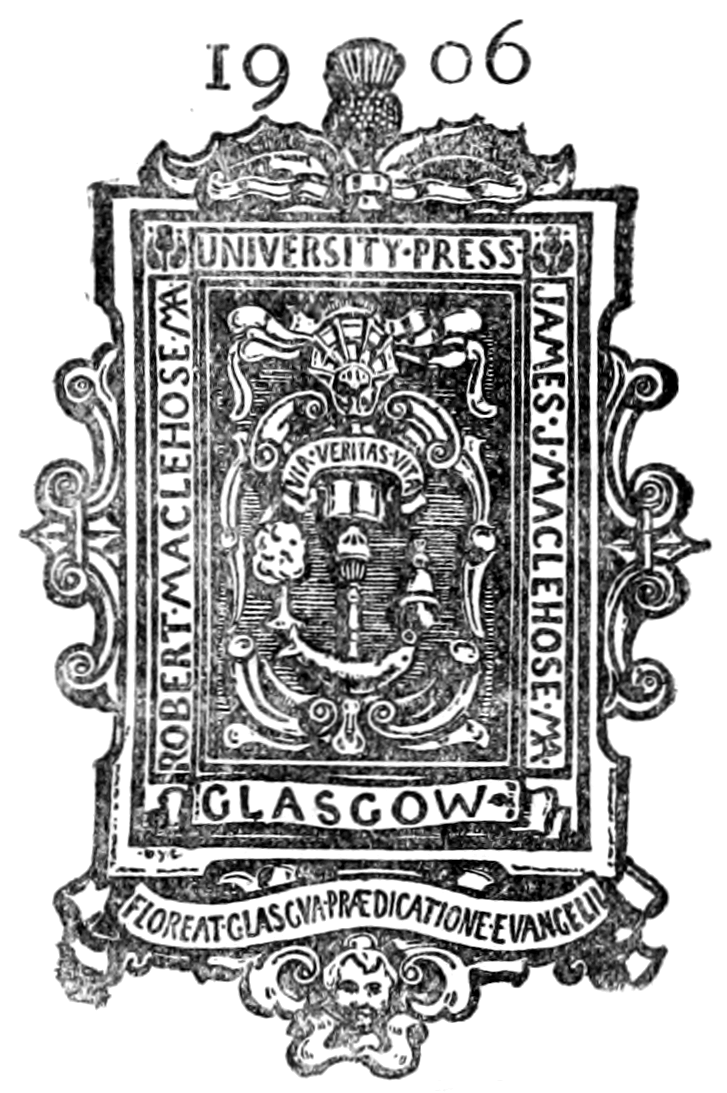
- Type: Private
- Industry: Publishing; bookselling; printing
- Founded: 1838; 188 years ago
- Founder: James MacLehose and Robert MacLehose
- Defunct: 1982
- Fate: Liquidated
- Headquarters: Glasgow, Scotland

James MacLehose and Sons was a bookseller, publisher, and printer in Glasgow in the 19th century.

== History ==
Started as independent businesses by James J. MacLehose and his brother, Robert MacLehose, the MacLehose family was active in the Glasgow book business in various ways through the 19th century.

The business was associated with Glasgow University and published many University Press titles. A collection of books were deposited at Glasgow University and are now in shelfmark "MacLehose", and family and business records and manuscripts are in the special collections with call number "Sp Coll MS Gen 1594".

The businesses operated variously under the names James MacLehose, Robert MacLehose, the MacLehose firm, James MacLehose and Sons, Robert MacLehose and Company, Robert MacLehose and Company, Limited, MacLehose, Jackson & Co., Jackson, Wylie & Co. (no relation to John Wiley & Sons), and the MacLehose group.

As a result of over expansion, the firm was liquidated in 1982.
