= Edward Caird =

Scottish philosopher (1835–1908)

Edward Caird FRSE FBA
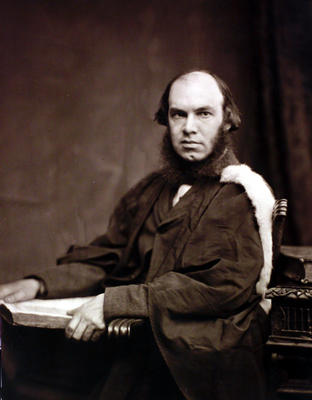
- Caird while a professor at the University of Glasgow
- Born: 23 March 1835; Greenock, Scotland
- Died: 1 November 1908 (aged 73); Oxford, England
- Relatives: John Caird (brother)

Education
- Education: University of Glasgow; Balliol College, Oxford
- Academic advisor: Benjamin Jowett

Philosophical work
- Era: 19th-century philosophy
- Region: Western philosophy
- School: British idealism
- Institutions: Merton College, Oxford
- Notable students: John Alexander Smith
- Main interests: Philosophy of religion
- Notable ideas: The relation of evolutionary theory to the development of thought and culture

Edward Caird (/kɛərd/; 23 March 1835 – 1 November 1908) was a Scottish philosopher. He was a holder of LLD, DCL, and DLitt.

== Life ==
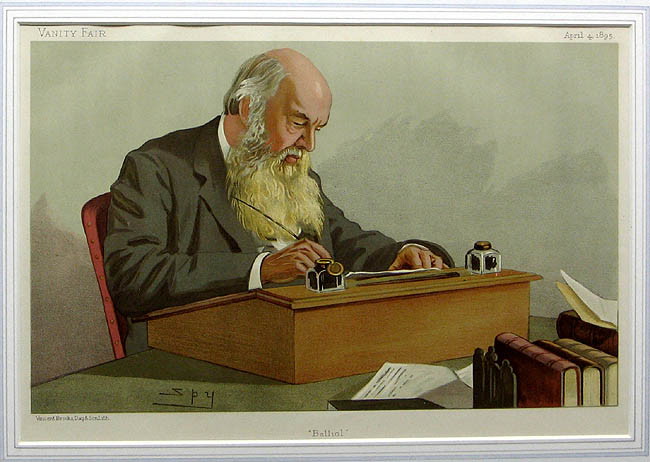
Caird as caricatured by Spy (Leslie Ward) in Vanity Fair, April 1895.

The younger brother of the theologian John Caird, he was the son of engineer John Caird, the proprietor of Caird & Company, born at Greenock in Renfrewshire, and educated at Greenock Academy, the University of Glasgow, and Balliol College, Oxford (B.A. 1863). He was a Fellow and Tutor of Merton College, Oxford from 1864 to 1866.

In 1866, he was appointed to the Chair of Moral Philosophy at Glasgow, which he held until 1893. In that year he became Master of Balliol College, from which he retired in 1907. In 1894 he was made an Honorary Fellow of Merton College.

He was elected an Honorary Fellow of the Royal Society of Edinburgh in 1900.

In May 1902 he was at Carnavon to receive the honorary degree D.Litt. (Doctor of Letters) from the University of Wales during the ceremony to install the Prince of Wales (later King George V) as Chancellor of that university.

He was a founder member of the Glasgow and West of Scotland Association for Women's Suffrage, alongside his wife, Caroline.

The philosopher John Watson was among his pupils at the University of Glasgow.

He died in Oxford on 1 November 1908 and was buried there in St Sepulchres Cemetery.

Caird was a Hegelian idealist and was an important contributor to the British idealist movement.

== Family ==
He married Caroline Frances Wylie in 1867. They had no children.

== Works ==
=== Books ===
- The Collected Works of Edward Caird, 12 volumes, ed. Colin Tyler, Bristol: Thoemmes Press, 1999
- A Critical Account of the Philosophy of Kant, with an Historical Introduction, Glasgow: J. Maclehose, 1877
- Hegel, Philadelphia: J. B. Lippincott and Co.; Edinburgh: W. Blackwood and Sons, 1883
- The Social Philosophy and Religion of Comte, Glasgow: J. Maclehose and Sons, 1885; New York: Macmillan, 1885
- The Critical Philosophy of Immanuel Kant, Glasgow: J. Maclehose and Sons, 1889; New York: Macmillan, 1889 (2 volumes) Volume 1 Volume 2 second edition 1909
- Essays on Literature and Philosophy, Glasgow: J. Maclehose and Sons, 1892 (2 volumes) Volume 1 Volume 2
- The Evolution of Religion, Glasgow: James Maclehose and Sons, 1893; New York: Macmillan, 1893 (Gifford Lectures 1890–92; I, II)
- The Evolution of Theology in the Greek Philosophers, Glasgow: J. Maclehose and Sons, 1904 (Gifford Lectures, 1900–02; I, II)
- Lay sermons and addresses, delivered in the Hall of Balliol College, Oxford (1907)

=== Pamphlets ===
- The Problem of Philosophy at the Present Time: an Introductory Address Delivered to the Philosophical Society of the University of Edinburgh, Glasgow, James Maclehose & Sons, 1881
- The Moral Aspect of the Economical Problem: Presidential Address to the Ethical Society, London, Swan Sonnenschein, Lowrey & Co., 1888
- Address on Plato's Republic as the Earliest Educational Treatise, Bangor: Jarvis & Foster, 1894
- Individualism and Socialism, Being the Inaugural Address to the Civic Society of Glasgow (1897)
- Idealism and the Theory of Knowledge, London: Henry Frowde, 1903

Academic offices
| Preceded by Benjamin Jowett | Master of Balliol College, Oxford; 1893–1907 | Succeeded by James Leigh Strachan-Davidson |
