= Coherence theory of truth =

Theory of truth based on coherence

In epistemology, the coherence theory of truth is a family of philosophical theories that characterize truth as a property of whole systems of propositions that can be ascribed to individual propositions only derivatively according to their coherence with the whole. While modern coherence theorists hold that there are many possible systems to which the determination of truth may be based upon coherence, others, particularly those with strong religious beliefs, hold that the truth only applies to a single absolute system. In general, truth requires a proper fit of elements within the whole system. Very often, though, coherence is taken to imply something more than simple formal coherence. For example, the coherence of the underlying set of concepts is considered to be a critical factor in judging validity for the whole system. In other words, the set of base concepts in a universe of discourse must first be seen to form an intelligible paradigm before many theorists will consider that the coherence theory of truth is applicable.

== History ==
In modern philosophy, the coherence theory of truth was defended by Baruch Spinoza, Immanuel Kant, Johann Gottlieb Fichte, Karl Wilhelm Friedrich Schlegel, Georg Wilhelm Friedrich Hegel and Harold Henry Joachim (who is credited with the definitive formulation of the theory). However, Spinoza and Kant have also been interpreted as defenders of the correspondence theory of truth. In contemporary philosophy, several epistemologists have significantly contributed to and defended the theory, primarily Brand Blanshard (who gave the earliest characterization of the theory in contemporary times) and Nicholas Rescher.

== Varieties ==
According to one view, the coherence theory of truth regards truth as coherence within some specified set of sentences, propositions or beliefs. It is the "theory of knowledge which maintains that truth is a property primarily applicable to any extensive body of consistent propositions, and derivatively applicable to any one proposition in such a system by virtue of its part in the system". Ideas like this are a part of the philosophical perspective known as confirmation holism. Coherence theories of truth claim that coherence and consistency are important features of a theoretical system, and that these properties are sufficient to its truth. To state it in the reverse, that "truth" exists only within a system, and doesn't exist outside of a system.

According to another version by H. H. Joachim (the philosopher credited with the definitive formulation of the theory, in his book The Nature of Truth, published in 1906), truth is a systematic coherence that involves more than logical consistency. In this view, a proposition is true to the extent that it is a necessary constituent of a systematically coherent whole. Others of this school of thought, for example, Brand Blanshard, hold that this whole must be so interdependent that every element in it necessitates and even entails every other element. Exponents of this view infer that the most complete truth is a property solely of a unique coherent system, called the absolute, and that humanly knowable propositions and systems have a degree of truth that is proportionate to how fully they approximate this ideal.

== Criticism ==
Perhaps the best-known objection to a coherence theory of truth is Bertrand Russell's. He maintained that since both a belief and its negation will, individually, cohere with at least one set of beliefs, this means that contradictory beliefs can be shown to be true according to coherence theory, and therefore that the theory cannot work. However, what most coherence theorists are concerned with is not all possible beliefs, but the set of beliefs that people actually hold. The main problem for a coherence theory of truth, then, is how to specify just this particular set, given that the truth of which beliefs are actually held can only be determined by means of coherence.

== See also ==
- Coherence theory of justification
- Confirmation holism
- Bayesian epistemology
