= R. L. Nettleship =

English philosopher (1846–1892)

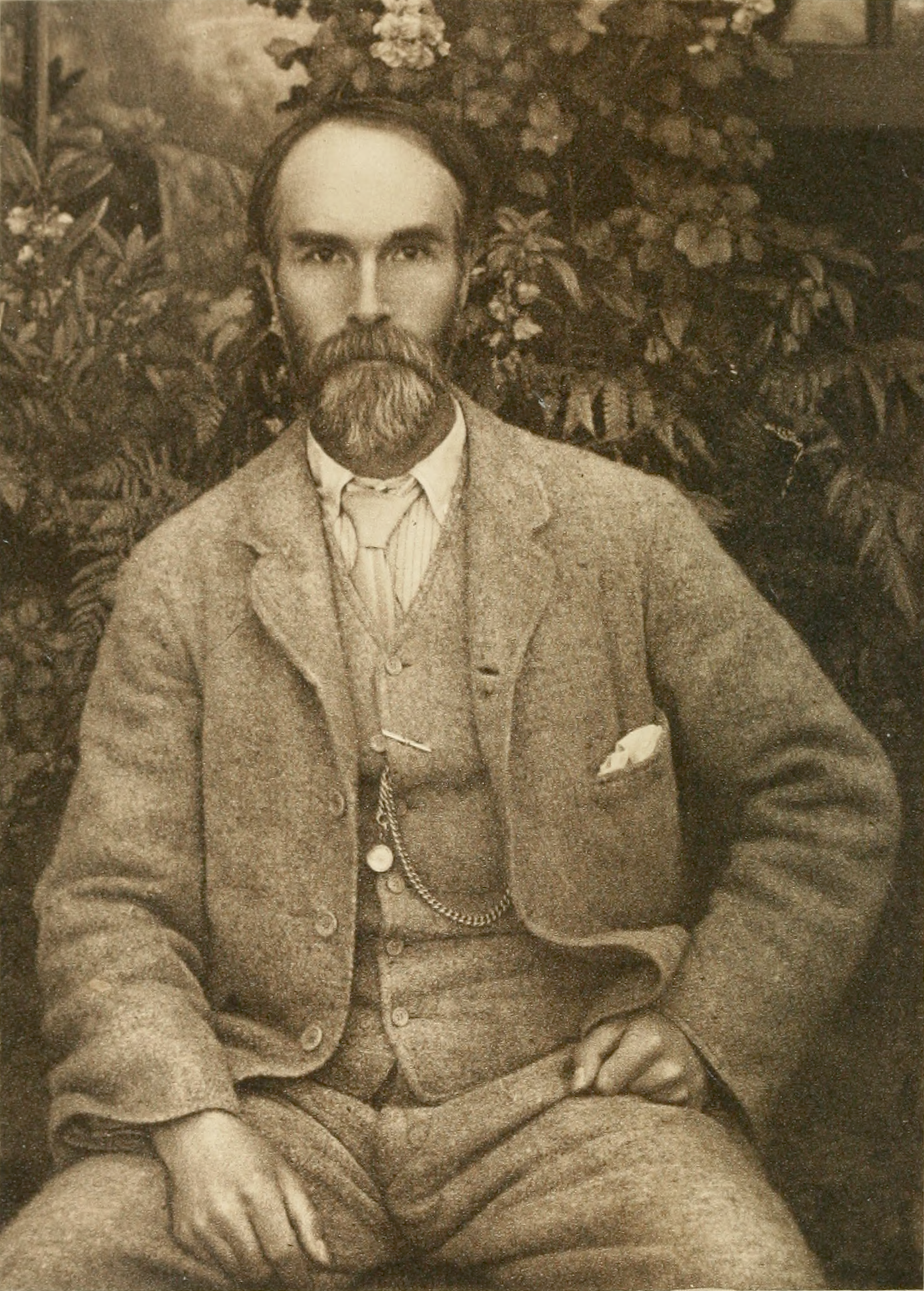
- Nettleship in 1889
- Born: Richard Lewis Nettleship; 17 December 1846; Kettering, Northamptonshire, England
- Died: 25 August 1892 (aged 45); Mont Blanc

Education
- Education: Uppingham School; Balliol College, Oxford

Philosophical work
- School: British idealism
- Institutions: Balliol College, Oxford

Richard Lewis Nettleship (17 December 1846 – 25 August 1892) was an English philosopher, born in Kettering.

== Life ==
The youngest brother of Henry Nettleship, he was educated at Uppingham and Balliol College, Oxford, where he held a scholarship. He won the Hertford scholarship, the Ireland, the Gaisford Prize for Greek verse, a Craven scholarship and the Arnold prize, but took only a second class in literae humaniores.

Nettleship became fellow and tutor of his college and succeeded to the work of T. H. Green, whose writings he edited with a memoir. He was fond of music and outdoor sports, and rowed in his college boat.

He died on 25 August 1892, from the effects of exposure on Mont Blanc, and was buried at Chamonix.

== Work ==
Nettleship left an unfinished work on Plato, part of which was published after his death, together with his lectures on logic and some essays. His long essay The Theory of Education in the Republic of Plato was published in Hellenica.

His thought was shaped by British idealism, embodying elements of Hegelianism but also, in its account of the Platonic Forms (eidē or ideai), markedly influenced by a particular reading of the Kantian categories. Many saw him as a model and example of philosophical honest and persistent philosophical inquiry. This did not prevent the undergraduates of Balliol from a gentle parody in the 1880 Masque of Balliol:

Roughly, so to say, you know,
I am N-TTL-SH-P or so;
You are gated after Hall,
That's all. I mean that's nearly all.

The inchoateness of Nettleship's philosophical thinking is more apparent in the Philosophical Remains than in the separate volume of lectures on Plato's Republic. From that volume a definite view of the aims, limits and scope of Plato's text emerges clearly. Few historians of philosophy would now accept, however, Nettleship's view of the analogy of the Line (509e-511c, 534a) as involving throughout a temporal progression.

== Selected bibliography ==
- Lectures on the Republic of Plato (2nd ed.). London: Macmillan & Co. 1955.
- The Theory of Education in Plato's Republic. Oxford: Clarendon Press. 1935.

== See also ==
- British idealism
