= British idealism =

Philosophical movement

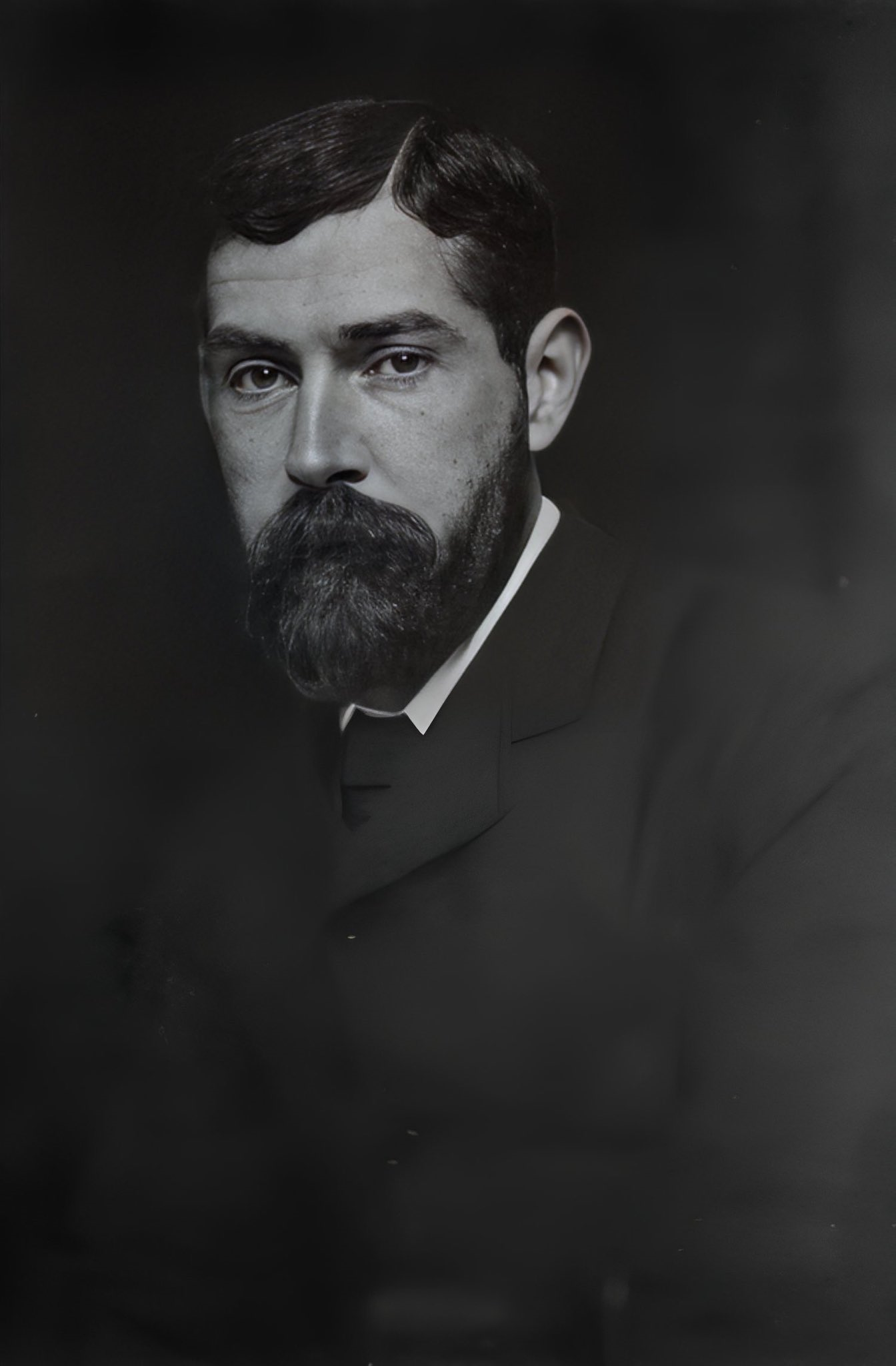
F. H. Bradley, the most famous British idealist

A subset of absolute idealism, British idealism was a philosophical movement that was influential in Britain from the mid-nineteenth century to the early twentieth century. The leading figures in the movement were T. H. Green (1836–1882), F. H. Bradley (1846–1924), and Bernard Bosanquet (1848–1923). They were succeeded by the second generation of J. H. Muirhead (1855–1940), J. M. E. McTaggart (1866–1925), H. H. Joachim (1868–1938), A. E. Taylor (1869–1945), and R. G. Collingwood (1889–1943). The last major figure in the tradition was G. R. G. Mure (1893–1979). Doctrines of early British idealism provoked the Cambridge philosophers G. E. Moore and Bertrand Russell to develop the philosophical methodology that gave rise to a new philosophical tradition, analytic philosophy.

== Overview ==
British idealism was generally marked by several broad tendencies: a belief in an Absolute (a single all-encompassing reality that in some sense formed a coherent and all-inclusive system); the assignment of a high place to reason as both the faculty by which the Absolute's structure is grasped and as that structure itself; and a fundamental unwillingness to accept a dichotomy between thought and object, reality consisting of thought-and-object together in a strongly coherent unity.

British idealism largely developed from the German idealist movement—particularly such philosophers as Immanuel Kant and G. W. F. Hegel, who were characterised by Green, among others, as the salvation of British philosophy after the alleged demise of empiricism. Thomas Carlyle did much to bring awareness of German idealism to the English-speaking world, and his own contributions were also highly influential on British idealism. The movement was a reaction against the thinking of John Locke, David Hume, John Stuart Mill, Henry Sidgwick, and other empiricists and utilitarians.

Up until the early 1860s accurate translations of Hegel's works were not available in Britain. However, this situation changed in 1865 with the publication of James Hutchison Stirling's book The Secret of Hegel, which is believed to have won significant converts in Britain.

British idealism was influenced by Hegel at least in broad outline, and undeniably adopted some of Hegel's terminology and doctrines. Examples include not only the aforementioned Absolute, but also a doctrine of internal relations, a coherence theory of truth, and a concept of a concrete universal. Some commentators have also pointed to a sort of dialectical structure in e.g. some of the writings of Bradley. But few of the British idealists adopted Hegel's philosophy wholesale, and his most significant writings on logic seem to have found no purchase whatsoever in their thought. On the other hand, G. R. G. Mure was "a deep student of Hegel" who "was committed to Hegel's 'central ontological thesis' all his life."

On its political side, the British idealists were largely concerned to refute what they regarded as a brittle and "atomistic" form of individualism, as espoused by e.g. Herbert Spencer, but also the utilitarianism of J.S. Mill and the 'socialism' of the Fabian Socialism such as Sidney and Beatrice Webb. On the idealist view, humans are fundamentally social beings in a manner and to a degree not adequately recognized by Spencer and his followers, yet individual initiative and 'self-realisation' are also central to their accounts. The British Idealists did not, however, reify the State in the manner that Hegel allegedly did; Green in particular spoke of the individual as the sole locus of value and contended that the State's existence was justified only insofar as it contributed to the realization of value in the lives of individual persons. Figures, such as Green and Bosanquet were active in social reform, as well.

The hold of British idealism in the United Kingdom weakened when Bertrand Russell and G. E. Moore, who were educated in the British idealist tradition, turned against it. In the late 1950s G. R. G. Mure, in his Retreat From Truth (Oxford 1958), criticized Russell, Ludwig Wittgenstein, and aspects of analytic philosophy from an idealist point of view.

British idealism was influential not only in Britain, but in philosophy throughout the British Empire as well as in East Asia. Philosophers such as Alfred Hoernlé in South Africa, John Watson in Canada, Sarvepalli Radhakrishnan in India and Yang Changji in China, drew on idealist metaphysics and political philosophy in developing their own idealist views. British idealism's influence in the United States was somewhat limited. The early thought of Josiah Royce had something of a neo-Hegelian cast, as did that of a handful of his less famous contemporaries. The American rationalist Brand Blanshard was strongly influenced by Bradley, Bosanquet, and Green (and other British philosophers). Even this limited influence, though, petered out through the latter half of the twentieth century. However, from the 1990s on, there has been a significant revival in interest in these ideas, as evidenced by, for instance, by the founding of the Michael Oakeshott Association, and renewed attention to the work of Collingwood, Green, and Bosanquet.

== British idealists ==
- F. H. Bradley
- J. M. E. McTaggart
- Bernard Bosanquet
- T. H. Green
- Edward Caird
- John Caird
- Henry Jones
- John Stuart Mackenzie
- J. H. Muirhead
- William Ritchie Sorley
- H. H. Joachim
- R. B. Haldane, 1st Viscount Haldane
- G. F. Stout
- James Ward
- A. E. Taylor
- Andrew Seth Pringle-Pattison
- Norman Kemp Smith
- Sir James Black Baillie
- May Sinclair
- R. L. Nettleship
- W. R. Boyce Gibson
- John Alexander Smith
- H. J. Paton
- James Hutchison Stirling
- Alexander Campbell Fraser
- William Wallace
- Robert Adamson
- R. G. Collingwood
- H. Wildon Carr
- Michael Oakeshott
- William Temple
- C. A. Campbell
- David George Ritchie
- James Lindsay
- A. C. Ewing
- Hastings Rashdall
- Timothy Sprigge

== See also ==
- British philosophy
- Canadian idealism
- Ideal utilitarianism
- Pluralistic idealism

== References and further reading ==
- William Sweet, ed., Biographical Encyclopedia of British Idealism, London; New York: Continuum, 2010.
- W. J. Mander, British Idealism: A History, New York, Oxford University Press, 2011.
- Colin Tyler, "'All history is the history of thought': competing British idealist historiographies." British Journal for the History of Philosophy 28.3 (2020): 573-593; focus on T.H. Green, Edward Caird, and F.H. Bradley.
- Sorley, William Ritchie. 1920. A History of English Philosophy.
  - An idiosyncratic account of English-language philosophy with an emphasis on idealism, later republished as A History of British Philosophy to 1900. online
- 'British Absolute Idealism: From Green to Bradley', in Jeremy Dunham, Iain Hamilton Grant and Sean Watson (eds), Idealism Durham: Acumen, 2011.
