= T. H. Green =

English philosopher (1836–1882)

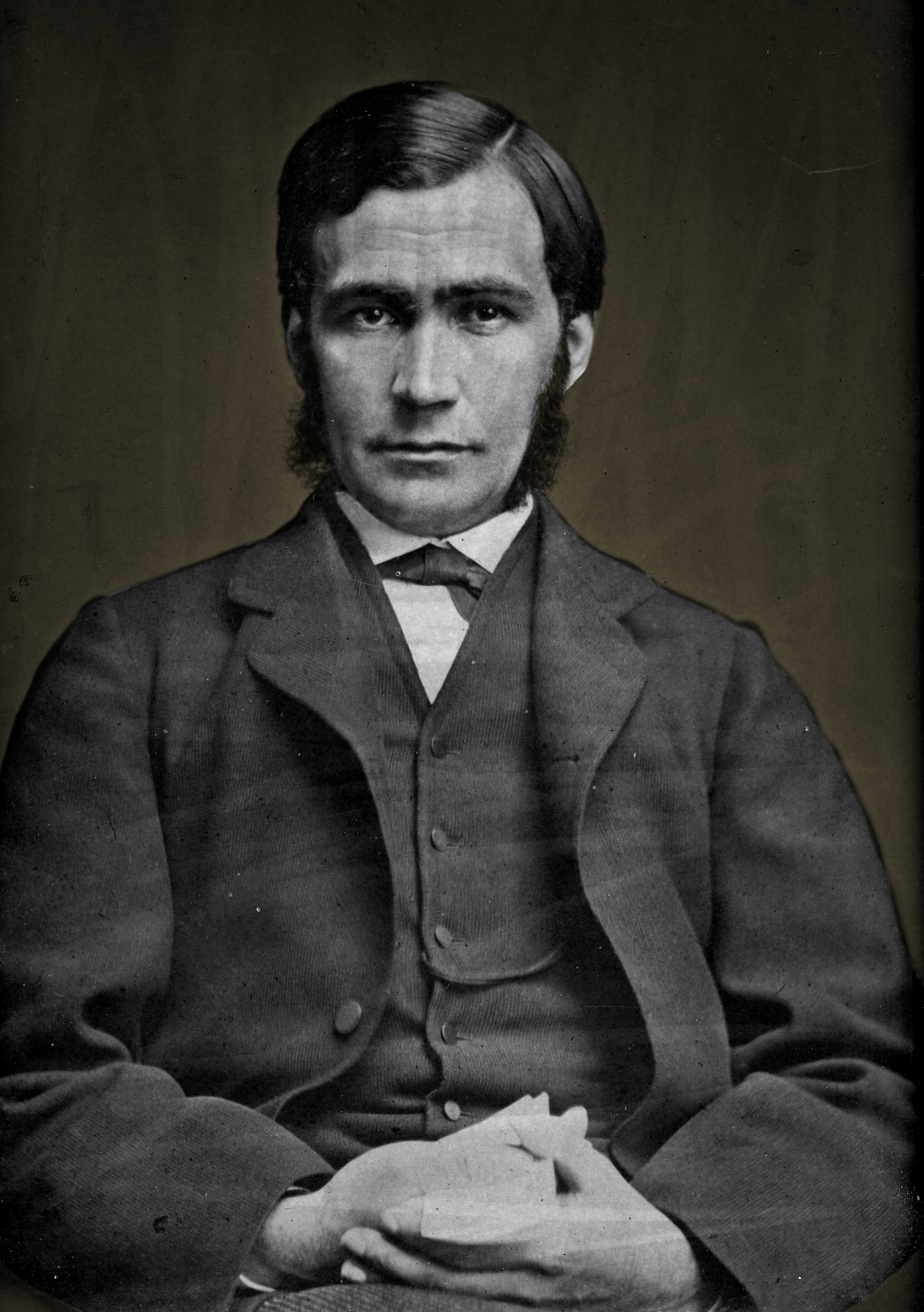
- Born: Thomas Hill Green; 7 April 1836; Birkin, England
- Died: 26 March 1882 (aged 45); Oxford, England
- Political party: Liberal
- Spouse: Charlotte Byron Green (m. 1871)

Education
- Education: Balliol College, Oxford
- Academic advisor: Benjamin Jowett

Philosophical work
- Era: 19th-century philosophy
- Region: Western philosophy
- School: British idealism; classical radicalism
- Institutions: Balliol College, Oxford
- Notable students: Bernard Bosanquet; F. H. Bradley; J. Cook Wilson; R. L. Nettleship; Hastings Rashdall
- Main interests: Metaphysics, epistemology, ethics, political philosophy
- Notable ideas: Social liberalism

Thomas Hill Green (7 April 1836 – 26 March 1882), known as T. H. Green, was an English philosopher, political radical and temperance reformer, and a member of the British idealism movement. Like all the British idealists, Green was influenced by the metaphysical historicism of G. W. F. Hegel. He was one of the thinkers behind the philosophy of social liberalism.

== Life ==
Green was born on 7 April 1836 at Birkin, in the West Riding of Yorkshire, England, where his father was rector. On his paternal side, he was descended from Oliver Cromwell. His education was conducted entirely at home until, at the age of 14, he entered Rugby, where he remained for five years.

In 1855, he became an undergraduate member of Balliol College, Oxford, and was elected fellow in 1860. He began a life of teaching (mainly philosophical) in the university—first as college tutor, and later, from 1878 until his death, as Whyte's Professor of Moral Philosophy.

The lectures he delivered as professor form the substance of his two most important works, viz., the Prolegomena to Ethics and the Lectures on the Principles of Political Obligation, which contain the whole of his positive constructive teaching. These works were not published until after his death, but Green's views were previously known indirectly through the Introduction to the standard edition of David Hume's works by Green and T. H. Grose, fellow of Queen's College, in which the doctrine of the "English" or "empirical" philosophy was exhaustively examined.

In 1871 he married Charlotte Byron Symonds who was known as a promoter of women's education. In 1879, Green sat on the committee formed to create an Oxford women's college "in which no distinction will be made between students on the ground of their belonging to different religious denominations." Green and his wife's work resulted in the founding of Somerville Hall (later Somerville College).

Green was involved in local politics for many years, through the university, temperance societies and the local Oxford Liberal association. During the passage of the Second Reform Act, he campaigned for the franchise to be extended to all men living in boroughs even if they did not own real property. In that sense, Green's position was more radical than that of most other Advanced Liberals, including William Ewart Gladstone.

It was in the context of his Liberal Party activities that in 1881, Green gave what became one of his most famous statements of his liberal political philosophy, the "Lecture on Liberal Legislation and Freedom of Contract". At this time, he was also lecturing on religion, epistemology, ethics, and political philosophy.

Most of his major works were published posthumously, including his lay sermons on Faith and The Witness of God, the essay "On the Different Senses of 'Freedom' as Applied to Will and the Moral Progress of Man", Prolegomena to Ethics, Lectures on the Principles of Political Obligation, and the "Lecture on Liberal Legislation and Freedom of Contract".

Green died of blood poisoning at the age of 45 on 26 March 1882. In addition to friends from his academic life, approximately 2,000 local townspeople attended his funeral.

He helped to found the City of Oxford High School for Boys.

== Thought ==
Hume's empiricism and biological evolution (including Herbert Spencer) were chief features in English thought during the third quarter of the 19th century. Green represents primarily the reaction against such doctrines. Green argued that when these doctrines were carried to their logical conclusion, they not only "rendered all philosophy futile", but were fatal to practical life. By reducing the human mind to a series of unrelated atomic sensations, these related teachings destroyed the possibility of knowledge, he argued. These teachings were especially important for Green to refute because they had underpinned the conception of mind that was held by the nascent science of psychology. Green tried to deflate the pretensions of psychologists who had claimed that their young field would provide a scientific replacement for traditional epistemology and metaphysics.

Green further objected that such empiricists represented a person as a "being who is simply the result of natural forces", and thereby made conduct, or any theory of conduct, meaningless; for life in any human, intelligible sense implies a personal self that (1) knows what to do, and (2) has power to do it. Green was thus driven, not theoretically, but as a practical necessity, to raise again the whole question of humankind in relation to nature. When (he held) we have discovered what a person in themselves are, and what their relation to their environment is, we shall then know their function—what they are fitted to do. In the light of this knowledge, we shall be able to formulate the moral code, which, in turn, will serve as a criterion of actual civic and social institutions. These form, naturally and necessarily, the objective expression of moral ideas, and it is in some civic or social whole that the moral ideal must finally take concrete shape.

=== What is man? ===
To ask "What is man?" is to ask "What is experience?" for experience means that of which I am conscious. The facts of consciousness are the only facts that, to begin with, we are justified in asserting to exist. On the other hand, they are valid evidence for whatever is necessary to their own explanation, i.e. for whatever is logically involved in them. Now the most striking characteristic of humans, that in fact which marks them specially, as contrasted with other animals, is self-consciousness. The simplest mental act into which we can analyse the operations of the human mind—the act of sense-perception—is never merely a change, physical or psychical, but is the consciousness of a change.

Human experience consists, not of processes in an animal organism, but of these processes recognised as such. That which we perceive is from the outset an apprehended fact—that is to say, it cannot be analysed into isolated elements (so-called sensations) which, as such, are not constituents of consciousness at all, but exist from the first as a synthesis of relations in a consciousness which keeps distinct the "self" and the various elements of the "object," though holding all together in the unity of the act of perception. In other words, the whole mental structure we call knowledge consists, in its simplest equally with its most complex constituents, of the "work of the mind." Locke and Hume held that the work of the mind was eo ipso [by that very act] unreal because it was "made by" humans and not "given to" humans. It thus represented a subjective creation, not an objective fact. But this consequence follows only upon the assumption that the work of the mind is arbitrary, an assumption shown to be unjustified by the results of exact science, with the distinction, universally recognised, which such science draws between truth and falsehood, between the real and "mere ideas." This (obviously valid) distinction logically involves the consequence that the object, or content, of knowledge, viz., reality, is an intelligible ideal reality, a system of thought relations, a spiritual cosmos. How is the existence of this ideal whole to be accounted for? Only by the existence of some "principle which renders all relations possible and is itself determined by none of them"; an eternal self-consciousness which knows in whole what we know in part. To God the world is, to humans the world becomes. Human experience is God gradually made manifest.

=== Moral philosophy ===
Carrying on the same method into the area of moral philosophy, Green argued that ethics applies to the conditions of social life—that investigation into human nature which metaphysics began. The faculty employed in this further investigation is no "separate moral faculty", but that same reason which is the source of all our knowledge—ethical and other.

Self-reflection gradually reveals to us human capacity, human function, with, consequently, human responsibility. It brings out into clear consciousness certain potentialities in the realisation of which human's true good must consist. As the result of this analysis, combined with an investigation into the surroundings humans live in, a "content"—a moral code—becomes gradually evolved. Personal good is perceived to be realisable only by making real and actual the conceptions thus arrived at. So long as these remain potential or ideal, they form the motive of action; motive consisting always in the idea of some "end" or "good" that humans present to themselves as an end in the attainment of which he would be satisfied; that is, in the realisation of which he would find his true self.

The determination to realise the self in some definite way constitutes an "act of will", which, as thus constituted, is neither arbitrary nor externally determined. For the motive which may be said to be its cause lies in the person himself, and the identification of the self with such a motive is a self-determination, which is at once both rational and free. The "freedom of man" is constituted, not by a supposed ability to do anything he may choose, but in the power to identify himself with that true good that reason reveals to him as his true good.

This good consists in the realisation of personal character; hence the final good, i.e. the moral ideal, as a whole, can be realised only in some society of persons who, while remaining ends to themselves in the sense that their individuality is not lost but rendered more perfect, find this perfection attainable only when the separate individualities are integrated as part of a social whole.

Society is as necessary to form persons as persons are to constitute society. Social union is the indispensable condition of the development of the special capacities of its individual members. Human self-perfection cannot be gained in isolation; it is attainable only in inter-relation with fellow-citizens in the social community.

The law of our being, so revealed, involves in its turn civic or political duties. Moral goodness cannot be limited to, still less constituted by, the cultivation of self-regarding virtues, but consists in the attempt to realise in practice that moral ideal that self-analysis has revealed to us as our ideal. From this fact arises the ground of political obligation, because the institutions of political or civic life are the concrete embodiment of moral ideas in terms of our day and generation. But, since society exists only for the proper development of Persons, we have a criterion by which to test these institutions—namely, do they, or do they not, contribute to the development of moral character in the individual citizens?

It is obvious that the final moral ideal is not realised in any body of civic institutions actually existing, but the same analysis that demonstrates this deficiency points out the direction that a true development will take.

Hence arises the conception of rights and duties that should be maintained by law, as opposed to those actually maintained; with the further consequence that it may become occasionally a moral duty to rebel against the state in the interest of the state itself—that is, in order better to subserve that end or function that constitutes the raison d'être of the state. There exists a "general will" that is a desire for a common good that cannot be easily reconciled as there is an antagonism between the "common good" and the "private good": such as: "... interest in the common good, in some of its various forms, is necessary to produce that good, and to neutralise or render useful other desires and interests". Its basis is can be conceived as coercive authority imposed upon the citizens from without or it can be seen as a necessary restriction of individual liberty in light of a social contract, but this consists in the spiritual recognition or metaphysics, on the part of the citizens, of what constitutes their true nature, some conceptions and complicating factors are elaborating questions concerning: "Will, not force, is the basis of the state.", "Citizen Rights Against the State", "Private Rights. The Right to Life and Liberty", "The Right of the State Over the Individual in War", "The Right of the State to Punish", "The Right of the State to Promote Morality ", "The Right of the State in Regard to Property", and "The Right of the State in Regard to the Family".

=== Philosophy of state action ===
Green believed that the state should foster and protect the social, political and economic environments in which individuals will have the best chance of acting according to their consciences. But the state must be careful when deciding which liberties to curtail and in which ways to curtail them. Over-enthusiastic or clumsy state intervention could easily close down opportunities for conscientious action thereby stifling the moral development of the individual. The state should intervene only where there is a clear, proven and strong tendency of a liberty to enslave the individual. Even when such a hazard had been identified, Green tended to favour action by the affected community itself rather than national state action itself—local councils and municipal authorities tended to produce measures that were more imaginative and better suited to the daily reality of a social problem. Hence he favoured the "local option" where local people decided on the issuing of liquor licences in their area, through their town councils.

Green stressed the need for specific solutions to be tailored to fit specific problems. He stressed that there are no eternal solutions, no timeless division of responsibilities between national and local governmental units. The distribution of responsibilities should be guided by the imperative to enable as many individuals as possible to exercise their conscientious wills in particular contingent circumstances, as only in this way was it possible to foster individual self-realisation in the long-run. Deciding on the distribution of responsibilities was more a matter for practical politics than for ethical or political philosophy. Experience may show that the local and municipal levels are unable to control the harmful influences of, say, the brewery industry. When it did show this, the national state should take responsibility for this area of public policy.

Green argued that the ultimate power to decide on the allocation of such tasks should rest with the national state (in Britain, for instance, embodied in Parliament). The national state itself is legitimate for Green to the extent that it upholds a system of rights and obligations that is most likely to foster individual self-realisation. Yet, the most appropriate structure of this system is determined neither by purely political calculation nor by philosophical speculation. It is more accurate to say that it arose from the underlying conceptual and normative structure of one's particular society.

=== Influence of Green's thought ===
Green's teaching was, directly and indirectly, the most potent philosophical influence in England during the last quarter of the 19th century, while his enthusiasm for a common citizenship, and his personal example in practical municipal life, inspired much of the effort made in the years succeeding his death to bring the universities more into touch with the people, and to break down the rigour of class distinctions. His ideas spread to the University of St Andrews through the influence of David George Ritchie, a former student of his, who eventually helped found the Aristotelian Society. John Dewey wrote a number of early essays on Green's thought, including Self-Realization as the Moral Ideal.

Green was directly cited by many social liberal politicians, such as Herbert Samuel and H. H. Asquith, as an influence on their thought. It is no coincidence that these politicians were educated at Balliol College, Oxford. Roy Hattersley called for Green's work to be applied to the problems of 21st century Britain.

== Works and commentary ==
Green's most important treatise—the Prolegomena to Ethics, practically complete in manuscript at his death—was published in the year following, under the editorship of A. C. Bradley (4th ed., 1899). Shortly afterwards, R. L. Nettleship's standard edition of his Works (exclusive of the Prolegomena) appeared in three volumes:

1. Reprints of Green's criticism of Hume, Spencer, G. H. Lewes
2. Lectures on Kant, on Logic, on the Principles of Political Obligation
3. Miscellanies, preceded by a full Memoir by the Editor.

The Principles of Political Obligation was afterwards published in separate form. A criticism of neo-Hegelianism can be found in Andrew Seth, Hegelianism and Personality (1887).

The book Hume and Locke, Apollo Editions, New York, 1968 (reprint of Thomas Y. Crowell Company edition) contains Green's "Introductions to Hume's Treatise of Human Nature" and also Green's "Introduction to the Moral Part of Hume's Treatise"

== See also ==
- Consent of the governed
- Liberalism in the United Kingdom
