= 19th-century philosophy =

In the 19th century the philosophers of the 18th-century Enlightenment began to have a dramatic effect on subsequent developments in philosophy. In particular, the works of Immanuel Kant gave rise to a new generation of German philosophers and began to see wider recognition internationally. Also, in a reaction to the Enlightenment, a movement called Romanticism began to develop towards the end of the 18th century. Key ideas that sparked changes in philosophy were the fast progress of science, including evolution, most notably postulated by Charles Darwin, Alfred Russel Wallace and Jean-Baptiste Lamarck, and theories regarding what is today called emergent order, such as the free market of Adam Smith within nation states, or the Marxist approach concerning class warfare between the ruling class and the working class developed by Karl Marx and Friedrich Engels. Pressures for egalitarianism, and more rapid change culminated in a period of revolution and turbulence that would see philosophy change as well.

== Brief historical outline ==
With the tumultuous years of 1789–1815, European culture was transformed by revolution, war and disruption. By ending many of the social and cultural props of the previous century, the stage was set for dramatic economic and political change. European philosophy reflected on, participated in, and drove, many of these changes.

=== Influences from the late Enlightenment ===
The last third of the 18th century produced a host of ideas and works which would both systematize previous philosophy, and present a deep challenge to the basis of how philosophy had been systematized. Immanuel Kant is a name that most would mention as being among the most important of influences, as is Jean-Jacques Rousseau. While both of these philosophers were products of the 18th century and its assumptions, they pressed at the boundaries. In trying to explain the nature of the state and government, Rousseau would challenge the basis of government with his declaration that "Man is born free, but is everywhere in chains". Kant, while attempting to preserve axiomic skepticism, was forced to argue that we do not see true reality, nor do we speak of it. All we know of reality is appearances. Since all we can see of reality is appearances, which are subject to certain necessary and subjective forms of perceptions, Kant postulates the idea of an unknowable (while at the same time limiting our use of science and the principle of causality to the appearances). Hegel's distinction between the unknowable and the circumstantially unknown can be seen as the beginnings of Hegel's rational system of the universe.

Yet another philosopher of the late Enlightenment that was influential in the 19th century was Pierre-Simon Laplace (1749–1827), whose formulation of nomological determinism is famous up to this day.

== Philosophical schools and tendencies ==
This is a partial list of schools of 19th-century philosophy (also known as late modern philosophy).

=== German idealism ===
One of the first philosophers to attempt to grapple with Kant's philosophy was Johann Gottlieb Fichte, whose development of Kantian metaphysics became a source of inspiration for the Romantics. In Wissenschaftslehre, Fichte argues that the self posits itself and is a self-producing and changing process.

Friedrich Wilhelm Joseph Schelling, a student of Fichte, continued to develop many of the same ideas and was also assimilated by the Romantics as something of an official philosopher for their movement. But it was another of Fichte's students, and former roommate of Schelling, who would rise to become the most prominent of the post-Kantian idealists: Georg Wilhelm Friedrich Hegel. His work revealed the increasing importance of historical thinking in German thought.

Arthur Schopenhauer, rejecting Hegel and also materialism, called for a return to Kantian transcendentalism, at the same time adopting atheism and determinism, amongst others. His secular thought became more popular in Europe in the second half of the 19th century, which coincided with the advents of Darwinism, positivism, Marxism and philological analysis of the Bible.

In the second half of the 19th century, an even more orthodox return to Kantian thought was espoused by a number of Neo-Kantian philosophers based in two main locations: the Marburg School and the Baden School. This trend of thought survived into the beginning of the next century, influencing 20th-century philosophical movements such as neopositivism and phenomenology.

One of the most famous opponents of idealism in the first half of the German 19th century was Ludwig Feuerbach, who advocated materialism and atheism.

=== Utilitarianism ===
Utilitarianism is a consequentialist approach to normative ethics that holds morally right actions are those that promote the most human happiness. Jeremy Bentham, who created his version of the theory in 1829, and John Stuart Mill who made his in 1861 are considered the founders of utilitarianism, though the basic concept predates either of the two philosophers. Utilitarianism remains as one of the more appealing and compelling approaches to normative ethics.

=== Marxism ===
Developed by Karl Marx and Friedrich Engels in the mid-to-late-19th century, Marxism is a sociopolitical and economic view based on the philosophy of dialectical materialism, which opposes idealism in favour of the materialist viewpoint. Marx analysed history itself as the progression of dialectics in the form of class struggle. From this it is argued that "the history of all hitherto existing society is the history of class struggles." According to Marx, this began with the phase of primitive communism (hunter-gatherer society), after which the Neolithic Revolution gave way to slave societies, progressing into the feudal society, and then into his present era of the Industrial Revolution, after which he held that the next step was for the proletariat to overthrow the owners of industry and establish a socialist society, which would further develop into a communist society, in which class distinctions, money, and the state would have withered from existence entirely.

Marxism had a profound influence on the history of the 20th century.

=== Existentialism ===
Existentialism as a philosophical movement is properly a 20th-century movement, but its major antecedents, Søren Kierkegaard and Friedrich Nietzsche wrote long before the rise of existentialism. In the 1840s, academic philosophy in Europe, following Hegel, was almost completely divorced from the concerns of individual human life, in favour of pursuing abstract metaphysical systems. Kierkegaard sought to reintroduce to philosophy, in the spirit of Socrates: subjectivity, commitment, faith, and passion, all of which are a part of the human condition.

Like Kierkegaard, Nietzsche saw the moral values of 19th-century Europe disintegrating into nihilism (Kierkegaard called it the levelling process). Nietzsche attempted to undermine traditional moral values by exposing its foundations. To that end, he distinguished between master and slave moralities, and claimed that man must turn from the meekness and humility of Europe's slave-morality.

Both philosophers are precursors to existentialism, among other ideas, for their importance on the "great man" against the age. Kierkegaard wrote of 19th-century Europe, "Each age has its own characteristic depravity. Ours is perhaps not pleasure or indulgence or sensuality, but rather a dissolute pantheistic contempt for the individual man."

=== Positivism ===
Auguste Comte, the self-professed founder of modern sociology, put forward the view that the rigorous ordering of confirmable observations alone ought to constitute the realm of human knowledge. He had hoped to order the sciences in increasing degrees of complexity from mathematics, astronomy, physics, chemistry, biology, and a new discipline called "sociology", which is the study of the "dynamics and statics of society".

=== Pragmatism ===
The American philosophers Charles Sanders Peirce and William James developed the pragmatist philosophy in the late 19th century. This school of thought holds that the value of an idea is based upon its practicability or utility rather than the extent to which it reflects reality.

=== British idealism ===
The twilight years of the 19th century in Britain saw the rise of British idealism, a revival of interest in the works of Immanuel Kant and Georg Wilhelm Friedrich Hegel, and a reaction against British Empiricism and Utilitarianism. The movement was partly kickstarted by James Hutchison Stirling's two-volume work The Secret of Hegel which helped facilitate the study of Hegel in England and introduced some elements that became characteristic of the British Idealist interpretation of Hegel. Besides incorporating varying portions of the philosophies of Kant and Hegel, many British Idealists also took ideas from earlier thinkers such as Aristotle and Plato. T. H. Green, F. H. Bradley, and Bernard Bosanquet are considered some of the major thinkers of British idealism.

=== Transcendentalism ===
Transcendentalism was rooted in Immanuel Kant's transcendence and German idealism, led by Ralph Waldo Emerson and Henry David Thoreau, who encountered German ideas through their readings of Samuel Taylor Coleridge and Thomas Carlyle. The main belief was in an ideal spiritual state that 'transcends' the physical and empirical and is only realized through the individual's intuition, rather than through the doctrines of established religions.

=== Social Darwinism ===
"Social Darwinism" refers to theories that apply the evolutionary concept of natural selection to human society in fields such as sociology, economics, and politics. Two major thinkers of this movement were Herbert Spencer and Francis Galton.

=== Ontologism ===
Ontologism is an ideological system, favored by many Catholic philosophers, which asserts that God and Divine ideas are the first object of our intelligence and the intuition of God the first act of our intellectual knowledge. Nicolas Malebranche was a source for many philosophers of Ontologism. In 1861, the Holy Office condemned Ontologism as unsafe for teaching (tuto tradi non-possunt). Two major thinkers of this movement are Vincenzo Gioberti and Antonio Rosmini.

== See also ==
- List of philosophers born in the nineteenth century
- List of centuries in philosophy
- Materialism controversy
