= James Mallory =

James Mallory may refer to:

- James Mallory (jurist) (1916–2003), Canadian jurist and constitutional expert
- J. P. Mallory (born 1945), archaeologist and linguistic comparativist
- James Mallory (coach) (1918–2001), American football coach and baseball player
- James Mallory (author), co-author, with Mercedes Lackey, of the Obsidian Mountain trilogy
