= Guy Laforest =

Canadian political scientist (born 1955)

Guy Laforest FRSC
- Born: 16 March 1955 (age 71); Quebec City, Quebec, Canada
- Political party: Action démocratique du Québec

Academic background
- Education: Université Laval; McGill University
- Thesis: Les sciences humaines modernes (1986)
- Academic advisors: Charles Taylor; James Tully
- Influences: Daniel Latouche; James Mallory

Academic work
- Discipline: Political science
- Sub-discipline: Political theory
- Institutions: University of Calgary; Université Laval

Guy Laforest (born 1955) is a Canadian political scientist and former director general of the École nationale d'administration publique. Previous to that he was director of the department of political science at the Université Laval, where he taught for more than 29 years. He was educated at Université Laval and McGill University. A former member of the University of Calgary's political science department, Laforest is the author of numerous publications on Canadian public policy. He has previously served as president of the Canadian Federation for the Humanities and Social Sciences.

Laforest was born in Quebec City, Quebec.

He supported the Quebec sovereignty option in the 1995 referendum and was featured on a nightly Téléjournal panel, debating then–University of Montreal political science professor Stéphane Dion. From 2002 to 2004, he served as President of the Action démocratique du Québec and ran as the party candidate in 2003 for the district of Louis-Hébert, finishing third with 24 per cent of the vote. Liberal candidate Sam Hamad won the election with 45 per cent of the vote.

== Publications ==
Laforest's publications include:

- De la prudence, 1993
- Reconciling the Solitudes, 1993
- Trudeau et la fin du rêve canadien, 1995
- Sortir de l'impasse: Vers la réconciliation, 1998
- Charles Taylor et l'interprétation de l'identité moderne, 1998

Party political offices
Preceded by Isabelle Marquis	President of Action démocratique du Québec; 2002–2004	Succeeded by Yvon Picotte
