= Charles Taylor (philosopher) =

Canadian philosopher (born 1931)

Charles Taylor CC GOQ FRSC FBA
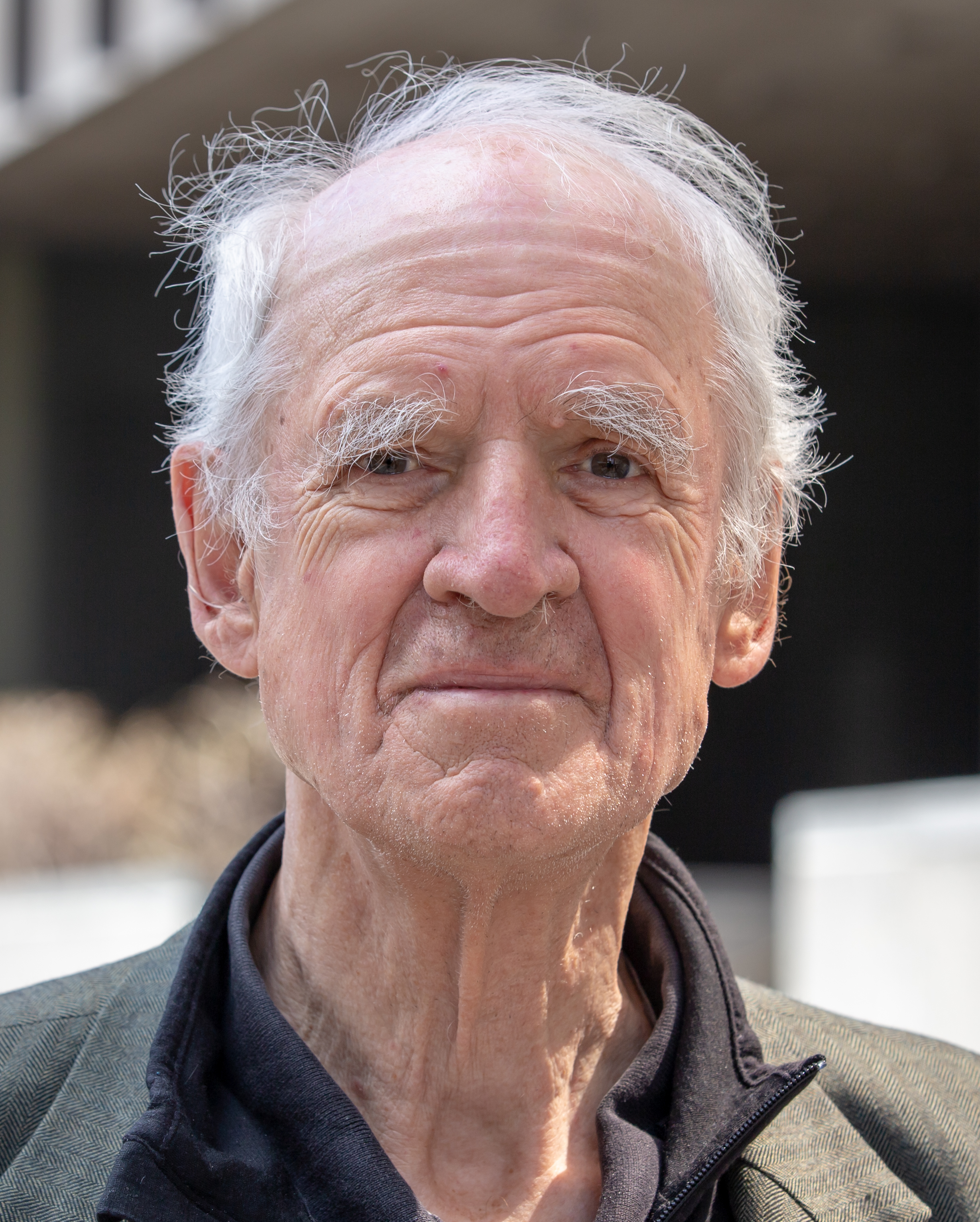
- Taylor in 2019
- Born: Charles Margrave Taylor; November 5, 1931 (age 95); Montreal, Quebec, Canada
- Spouses: Alba Romer Taylor (m. 1956; died 1990); Aube Billard (m. 1995)
- Children: 5
- Relatives: Gretta Chambers (sister); Egan Chambers (brother-in-law)
- Awards: Templeton Prize (2007); Kyoto Prize (2008); Kluge Prize (2015); Berggruen Prize (2016)

Education
- Education: McGill University (BA); Balliol College, Oxford (BA, DPhil)
- Thesis: Explanation in Social Science (1961)
- Doctoral advisor: Isaiah Berlin

Philosophical work
- Era: Contemporary philosophy
- Region: Western philosophy • Canadian philosophy
- School: Analytic philosophy (early); continental philosophy (hermeneutics) (late); communitarianism; Hegelianism
- Institutions: All Souls College, Oxford; McGill University; Northwestern University
- Doctoral students: Ruth Abbey; Frederick C. Beiser; Michael E. Rosen; Michael J. Sandel
- Notable students: Richard Kearney; Guy Laforest; Daniel Weinstock
- Main interests: Social philosophy; political philosophy; cosmopolitanism; secularity; religion; modernity
- Notable works: Sources of the Self (1989); The Malaise of Modernity (1991); "The Politics of Recognition" (1992); A Secular Age (2007)
- Notable ideas: Communitarian critique of liberalism; critique of naturalism and formalist epistemology; engaged hermeneutics

Charles Margrave Taylor (born November 5, 1931) is a Canadian philosopher and professor emeritus at McGill University best known for his contributions to political philosophy, the philosophy of social science, the history of philosophy, and intellectual history. A devout Catholic philosopher, his work has earned him the Kyoto Prize, the Templeton Prize, the Berggruen Prize for Philosophy, and the John W. Kluge Prize.

In 2007, Taylor served with Gérard Bouchard on the Bouchard–Taylor Commission on reasonable accommodation with regard to cultural differences in the province of Quebec. He has also made contributions to moral philosophy, epistemology, hermeneutics, aesthetics, the philosophy of mind, the philosophy of language, and the philosophy of action.

== Early life and education ==
Charles Margrave Taylor was born in Montreal, Quebec, on November 5, 1931, to a Roman Catholic Francophone mother and a Protestant Anglophone father by whom he was raised bilingually. His father, Walter Margrave Taylor, was a steel magnate originally from Toronto while his mother, Simone Marguerite Beaubien, was a dressmaker. His sister was Gretta Chambers.

Taylor attended Selwyn House School from 1939 to 1946, followed by Trinity College School from 1946 to 1949, and began his undergraduate education at McGill University where he received a Bachelor of Arts (BA) degree in history in 1952. He continued his studies at the University of Oxford, first as a Rhodes Scholar at Balliol College, receiving a BA degree with first-class honours in philosophy, politics and economics in 1955, and then as a postgraduate student, receiving a Doctor of Philosophy degree in 1961 under the supervision of Sir Isaiah Berlin.

As an undergraduate student, Taylor started one of the first campaigns to ban thermonuclear weapons in the United Kingdom in 1956, serving as the first president of the Oxford Campaign for Nuclear Disarmament. Recent research has explored Taylor's engagement with socialist politics during this time.

== Career ==
Taylor succeeded John Plamenatz as Chichele Professor of Social and Political Theory at the University of Oxford and became a fellow of All Souls College.

For many years, both before and after Oxford, he was Professor of Political Science and Philosophy at McGill University in Montreal, where he is now professor emeritus. Taylor was also a Board of Trustees Professor of Law and Philosophy at Northwestern University in Evanston, Illinois, for several years after his retirement from McGill.

In 1986, Taylor was elected a foreign honorary member of the American Academy of Arts and Sciences. In 1991, Taylor was appointed to the Conseil de la langue française in the province of Quebec, at which point he critiqued Quebec's commercial sign laws. In 1995, he was made a Companion of the Order of Canada. In 2000, he was made a Grand Officer of the National Order of Quebec.

In 2007, Taylor and Gérard Bouchard were appointed to head a one-year commission of inquiry into what would constitute reasonable accommodation for minority cultures in his home province of Quebec.

== Views ==
Despite his extensive and diverse philosophical oeuvre, Taylor famously calls himself a "monomaniac," concerned with only one fundamental aspiration: to develop a convincing philosophical anthropology.

Taylor's philosophical background, especially his writings on Georg Wilhelm Friedrich Hegel, Ludwig Wittgenstein, Martin Heidegger, and Maurice Merleau-Ponty, is important to his views. Taylor rejects naturalism and formalist epistemology. He is part of an influential intellectual tradition of Canadian idealism that includes John Watson, George Paxton Young, C. B. Macpherson, and George Grant.

In his essay "To Follow a Rule," Taylor explores why people can fail to follow rules, and what kind of knowledge it is that allows a person to successfully follow a rule, such as the arrow on a sign. The intellectualist tradition presupposes that to follow directions, we must know a set of propositions and premises about how to follow directions.

Taylor argues that Wittgenstein's solution is that all interpretation of rules draws upon a tacit background. This background is not more rules or premises, but what Wittgenstein calls "forms of life." More specifically, Wittgenstein says in the Philosophical Investigations that "Obeying a rule is a practice." Taylor situates the interpretation of rules within the practices that are incorporated into our bodies in the form of habits, dispositions and tendencies.

Following Heidegger, Merleau-Ponty, Hans-Georg Gadamer, Michael Polanyi, and Wittgenstein, Taylor argues that it is mistaken to presuppose that our understanding of the world is primarily mediated by representations. It is only against an unarticulated background that representations can make sense to us. On occasion we do follow rules by explicitly representing them to ourselves, but Taylor reminds us that rules do not contain the principles of their own application: application requires that we draw on an unarticulated understanding or "sense of things" — the background.

== Critique of naturalism ==
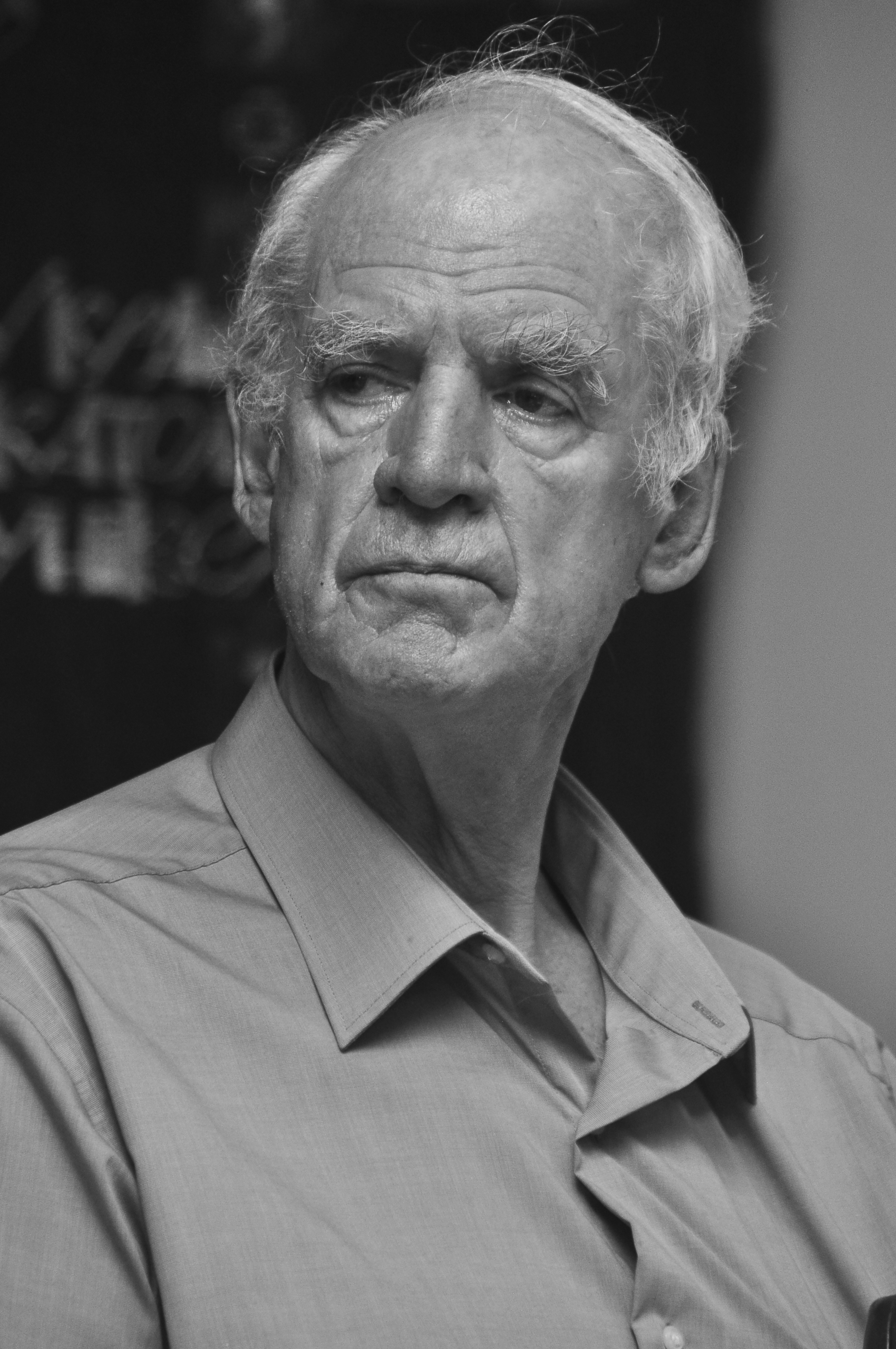
Taylor in 2012

Taylor defines naturalism as a family of various, often quite diverse theories that all hold "the ambition to model the study of man on the natural sciences." Philosophically, naturalism was largely popularized and defended by the unity of science movement that was advanced by logical positivist philosophy. In many ways, Taylor's early philosophy springs from a critical reaction against the logical positivism and naturalism that was ascendant in Oxford while he was a student.

Initially, much of Taylor's philosophical work consisted of careful conceptual critiques of various naturalist research programs. This began with his 1964 dissertation The Explanation of Behaviour, which was a detailed and systematic criticism of the behaviourist psychology of B. F. Skinner that was highly influential at mid-century.

From there, Taylor also spread his critique to other disciplines. The essay "Interpretation and the Sciences of Man" was published in 1972 as a critique of the political science of the behavioural revolution advanced by giants of the field like David Easton, Robert Dahl, Gabriel Almond, and Sydney Verba. In an essay entitled "The Significance of Significance: The Case for Cognitive Psychology", Taylor criticized the naturalism he saw distorting the major research program that had replaced B. F. Skinner's behaviourism.

But Taylor also detected naturalism in fields where it was not immediately apparent. For example, in 1978's "Language and Human Nature" he found naturalist distortions in various modern "designative" theories of language, while in Sources of the Self (1989) he found both naturalist error and the deep moral, motivational sources for this outlook in various individualist and utilitarian conceptions of selfhood.

== Hermeneutics ==
Concurrent to Taylor's critique of naturalism was his development of an alternative. Indeed, Taylor's mature philosophy begins when as a doctoral student at Oxford he turned away, disappointed, from analytic philosophy in search of other philosophical resources which he found in French and German modern hermeneutics and phenomenology.

The hermeneutic tradition develops a view of human understanding and cognition as centred on the decipherment of meanings (as opposed to, say, foundational theories of brute verification or an apodictic rationalism). Taylor's own philosophical outlook can broadly and fairly be characterized as hermeneutic and has been called engaged hermeneutics. This is clear in his championing of the works of major figures within the hermeneutic tradition such as Wilhelm Dilthey, Heidegger, Merleau-Ponty, and Gadamer. It is also evident in his own original contributions to hermeneutic and interpretive theory.

== Communitarian critique of liberalism ==
Taylor (as well as Alasdair MacIntyre, Michael Walzer, and Michael Sandel) is associated with a communitarian critique of liberal theory's understanding of the "self". Communitarians emphasize the importance of social institutions in the development of individual meaning and identity.

In his 1991 Massey Lecture The Malaise of Modernity, Taylor argued that political theorists—from John Locke and Thomas Hobbes to John Rawls and Ronald Dworkin—have neglected the way in which individuals arise within the context supplied by societies. A more realistic understanding of the "self" recognizes the social background against which life choices gain importance and meaning.

== Philosophy and sociology of religion ==
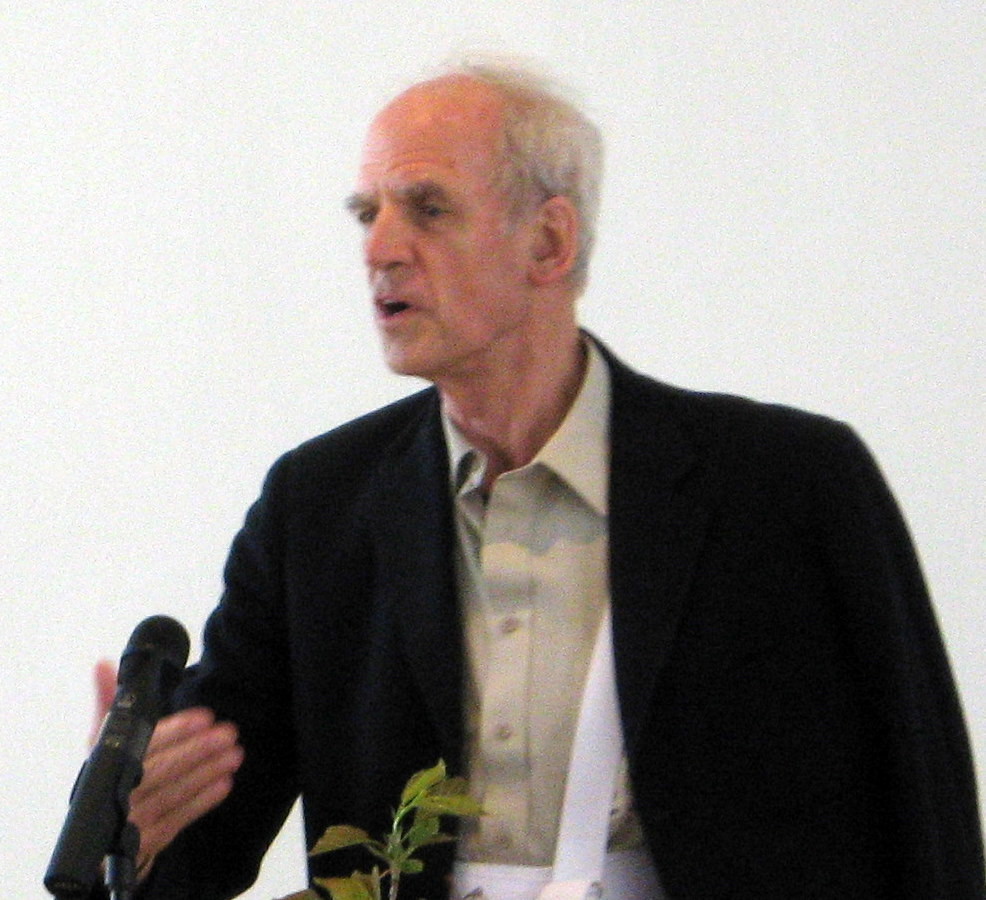
Taylor giving a lecture in 2007

Taylor's later work has turned to the philosophy of religion, as evident in several pieces, including the lecture "A Catholic Modernity" and the short monograph "Varieties of Religion Today: William James Revisited".

Taylor's most significant contribution in this field to date is his book A Secular Age which argues against the secularization thesis of Max Weber, Steve Bruce, and others. In rough form, the secularization thesis holds that as modernity (a bundle of phenomena including science, technology, and rational forms of authority) progresses, religion gradually diminishes in influence. Taylor begins from the fact that the modern world has not seen the disappearance of religion but rather its diversification and in many places its growth. He then develops a complex alternative notion of what secularization actually means given that the secularization thesis has not been borne out. In the process, Taylor also greatly deepens his account of moral, political, and spiritual modernity that he had begun in Sources of the Self.

== Politics ==
Taylor was a candidate for the social democratic New Democratic Party (NDP) in Mount Royal on three occasions in the 1960s, beginning with the 1962 federal election when he came in third behind Liberal Alan MacNaughton. He improved his standing in 1963, coming in second. Most famously, he also lost in the 1965 election to newcomer and future prime minister, Pierre Trudeau. This campaign garnered national attention. Taylor's fourth and final attempt to enter the House of Commons of Canada was in the 1968 federal election, when he came in second as an NDP candidate in the riding of Dollard. In 1994 he coedited a paper on human rights with Vitit Muntarbhorn in Thailand.

Taylor served as a vice president of the federal NDP (beginning c. 1965) and was president of its Quebec section.

In 2010, Taylor stated that multiculturalism was a work in progress that faced challenges. He identified tackling Islamophobia in Canada as the next challenge.

In his 2020 book Reconstructing Democracy he, together with Patrizia Nanz and Madeleine Beaubien Taylor, uses local examples to describe how democracies in transformation might be revitalized by involving citizenship.

In 2026, Taylor endorsed Avi Lewis in that year's federal NDP leadership race.

== Awards ==
In 1997, Taylor was awarded the Hegel Prize. In 2003, he was awarded the Social Sciences and Humanities Research Council's Gold Medal for Achievement in Research, which had been the council's highest honour. He was awarded the 2007 Templeton Prize for progress towards research or discoveries about spiritual realities, which included a cash award of US$1.5 million.

In June 2008, Taylor was awarded the Kyoto Prize in the arts and philosophy category. The Kyoto Prize is sometimes referred to as the Japanese Nobel. In 2015, he was awarded the John W. Kluge Prize for Achievement in the Study of Humanity, a prize he shared with philosopher Jürgen Habermas. In 2016, he was awarded the inaugural $1-million Berggruen Prize for being "a thinker whose ideas are of broad significance for shaping human self-understanding and the advancement of humanity".

== Interlocutors ==
- Himani Bannerji: "Charles Taylor's Politics of Recognition: A Critique" (2000)
- Richard Rorty
- Bernard Williams
- Alasdair MacIntyre: critique of liberalism
- Will Kymlicka
- Martha Nussbaum
- Kwame Appiah
- Hubert Dreyfus: co-author
- Quentin Skinner
- Talal Asad
- Marcel Gauchet
- Arjun Appadurai: on the imaginary
- Paul Berman
- William E. Connolly
- Robert Bellah: on Taylor's A Secular Age
- John Milbank
- Stuart Hall
- Catherine Pickstock
- James Tully: on Taylor on "Deep Diversity"
- Jürgen Habermas: shared Kluge prize

== Published works ==
=== Books ===
- The Explanation of Behaviour. Routledge Kegan Paul. 1964.
- The Pattern of Politics. Toronto: McClelland and Stewart. 1970.
- Erklärung und Interpretation in den Wissenschaften vom Menschen (in German). Frankfurt: Suhrkamp. 1975.
- Hegel. Cambridge, England: Cambridge University Press. 1975.
- Hegel and Modern Society. Cambridge, England: Cambridge University Press. 1979.
- Social Theory as Practice. Delhi: Oxford University Press. 1983. (Note: Reprinted in Taylor's Philosophical Papers series.)
- Human Agency and Language. Philosophical Papers. Vol. 1. Cambridge, England: Cambridge University Press. 1985.
- Philosophy and the Human Sciences. Philosophical Papers. Vol. 2. Cambridge, England: Cambridge University Press. 1985.
- Sources of the Self: The Making of Modern Identity. Cambridge, Massachusetts: Harvard University Press. 1989.
- The Malaise of Modernity. Concord, Ontario: House of Anansi Press. 1991. (Note: The published version of Taylor's Massey Lectures. Republished in the US in 1992 as The Ethics of Authenticity.)
- The Ethics of Authenticity. Harvard University Press. 1991.
- Multiculturalism and "The Politics of Recognition". Edited by Gutmann, Amy. Princeton, New Jersey: Princeton University Press. 1992. (Note: Republished in 1994 with additional commentaries as Multiculturalism: Examining The Politics of Recognition.)
- Rapprocher les solitudes: écrits sur le fédéralisme et le nationalisme au Canada [Reconciling the Solitudes: Writings on Canadian Federalism and Nationalism] (in French). Edited by Laforest, Guy. Sainte-Foy, Quebec: Les Presses de l'Université Laval. 1992.
  - English translation: Reconciling the Solitudes: Essays on Canadian Federalism and Nationalism. Edited by Laforest, Guy. Montreal: McGill-Queen's University Press. 1993.
- Road to Democracy: Human Rights and Human Development in Thailand. With Muntarbhorn, Vitit. Montreal: International Centre for Human Rights and Democratic Development. 1994.
- Philosophical Arguments. Cambridge, Massachusetts: Harvard University Press. 1995.
- Identitet, Frihet och Gemenskap: Politisk-Filosofiska Texter (in Swedish). Edited by Grimen, Harald. Gothenburg, Sweden: Daidalos. 1995.
- De politieke Cultuur van de Moderniteit (in Dutch). The Hague, Netherlands: Kok Agora. 1996.
- La liberté des modernes (in French). Translated by de Lara, Philippe. Paris: Presses Universitaires de France. 1997.
- A Catholic Modernity? Edited by Heft, James L. New York: Oxford University Press. 1999.
- Prizivanje gradjanskog drustva [Invoking Civil Society] (in Serbo-Croatian). Edited by Savic, Obrad.
- Wieviel Gemeinschaft braucht die Demokratie? Aufsätze zur politische Philosophie (in German). Frankfurt: Suhrkamp. 2002.
- Varieties of Religion Today: William James Revisited. Cambridge, Massachusetts: Harvard University Press. 2002.
- Modern Social Imaginaries. Durham, North Carolina: Duke University Press. 2004.
- A Secular Age. Cambridge, Massachusetts: Belknap Press of Harvard University Press. 2007.
- Laïcité et liberté de conscience (in French). With Maclure, Jocelyn. Montreal: Boréal. 2010.
  - English translation: Secularism and Freedom of Conscience. With Maclure, Jocelyn. Translated by Todd, Jane Marie. Cambridge, Massachusetts: Harvard University Press. 2011.
- Dilemmas and Connections: Selected Essays. Cambridge, Massachusetts: Belknap Press of Harvard University Press. 2011.
- Church and People: Disjunctions in a Secular Age. Edited with Casanova, José; McLean, George F. Washington: Council for Research in Values and Philosophy. 2012.
- Democracia Republicana / Republican Democracy. Edited by Cristi, Renato; Tranjan, J. Ricardo. Santiago: LOM Ediciones. 2012.
- Boundaries of Toleration. Edited with Stepan, Alfred C. New York: Columbia University Press. 2014.
- Incanto e Disincanto. Secolarità e Laicità in Occidente (in Italian). Edited and translated by Costa, Paolo. Bologna, Italy: EDB. 2014.
- La Democrazia e i Suoi Dilemmi (in Italian). Edited and translated by Costa, Paolo. Parma, Italy: Diabasis. 2014.
- Les avenues de la foi : Entretiens avec Jonathan Guilbault (in French). Montreal: Novalis. 2015.
  - English translation: Avenues of Faith: Conversations with Jonathan Guilbault. Translated by Shalter, Yanette. Waco, Texas: Baylor University Press. 2020.
- Retrieving Realism. With Dreyfus, Hubert. Cambridge, Massachusetts: Harvard University Press. 2015.
- The Language Animal: The Full Shape of the Human Linguistic Capacity. Cambridge, Massachusetts: Belknap Press of Harvard University Press. 2016.
- Reconstructing Democracy. How Citizens Are Building from the Ground Up. With Nanz, Patrizia; Beaubien Taylor, Madeleine. Cambridge, Massachusetts: Harvard University Press. 2020
- Cosmic Connections: Poetry in the Age of Disenchantment. Cambridge, Massachusetts: Belknap Press of Harvard University Press. 2024.

=== Selected book chapters ===
- Taylor, Charles (1982). "The Diversity of Goods". In Sen, Amartya; Williams, Bernard (eds.). Utilitarianism and Beyond. Cambridge: Cambridge University Press. pp. 129–144. ISBN 9780511611964.

== See also ==
- List of Canadian philosophers
- List of Catholic philosophers and theologians
- List of people from Montreal

== Notes ==
Academic offices
Preceded by John Plamenatz	Chichele Professor of Social and Political Theory; 1976–1981	Succeeded by G. A. Cohen
Preceded by Richard Lewontin	Massey Lecturer; 1991	Succeeded by Robert Heilbroner
Preceded by G. A. Cohen	Tanner Lecturer on Human Values at Stanford University; 1991–1992	Succeeded by Thomas E. Hill
Preceded by Holmes Rolston III	Gifford Lecturer at the University of Edinburgh; 1998–1999	Succeeded by David Tracy
Preceded by David Fergusson	Gifford Lecturer at the University of Glasgow; 2009	Succeeded by Gianni Vattimo
Preceded by Margaret Atwood	Beatty Lecturer; 2017	Succeeded by Roxane Gay
Awards
Preceded by Alice Munro	Molson Prize; 1991; With: Denys Arcand	Succeeded by Douglas Cardinal
Preceded by Jean-Jacques Nattiez	Molson Prize; 1991; With: Denys Arcand	Succeeded by Fernand Dumont
Preceded by Bruce Trigger	Prix Léon-Gérin; 1992	Succeeded by Gérard Bouchard
Preceded by J. Bryan Hehir	Marianist Award for Intellectual Contributions; 1996	Succeeded by Gustavo Gutiérrez
New award	SSHRC Gold Medal for Achievement in Research; 2003	Succeeded by Alex Michalos
Preceded by John D. Barrow	Templeton Prize; 2007	Succeeded by Michał Heller
Preceded by Pina Bausch	Kyoto Prize in Arts and Philosophy; 2008	Succeeded by Pierre Boulez
Preceded by Fernando Henrique Cardoso	Kluge Prize; 2015; With: Jürgen Habermas	Succeeded by Drew Gilpin Faust
New award	Berggruen Prize; 2016	Succeeded by The Baroness O'Neill of Bengarve
Preceded by Anita Desai	Blue Metropolis; International Literary Grand Prize; 2019	Succeeded by Annie Proulx
Preceded by Mario Botta	Ratzinger Prize; 2019; With: Paul Béré	Succeeded by Jean-Luc Marion
Preceded by Marianne Schlosser	Ratzinger Prize; 2019; With: Paul Béré	Succeeded by Tracey Rowland
