= Arlene Fiore =

American atmospheric chemist

Arlene M. Fiore
- Other name: Arlene Fiore Field
- Education: Ph.D in Earth and Planetary Sciences, Harvard University, 2003
- Awards: American Geophysical Union James B. Macelwane Medal, December 2011. Presidential Early Career Award for Scientists and Engineers (PECASE), July 2006. American Geophysical Union James R. Holton Junior Scientist Award, December 2005.
- Scientific career
- Fields: Air quality Climate change and variability Atmospheric chemistry
- Workplaces: Columbia University
- Thesis: Linking regional air pollution with global chemistry and climate: The role of background ozone (2002)
- Website: https://atmoschem.ldeo.columbia.edu/

Arlene M. Fiore is an atmospheric chemist whose research focuses on issues surrounding air quality and climate change.

== Education ==
In 1997 Arlene M. Fiore graduated Harvard College magna cum laude with an A.B. in Environmental Geoscience. She continued her education at Harvard University, graduating in 2003 with a Ph.D. in Earth and Planetary Sciences. Her thesis was titled "Linking regional air pollution with global chemistry and climate: The role of background ozone." In this dissertation, Fiore discusses the importance of background ozone in connecting local air quality with global climate and chemistry, concluding that pollution enhances background ozone and leads to greater climate warming.

== Career and research ==
As an undergraduate at Harvard University, Fiore worked on ozone smog for her honors thesis. As a graduate student at Harvard, Fiore worked with the Harvard Atmospheric Chemistry Modeling Group. Before becoming a professor, Fiore continued her research at the Atmospheric and Ocean Sciences Program at Princeton University, the Geophysical Fluid Dynamics Laboratory, and the National Center for Atmospheric Research. In 2011, Fiore started as a professor in the Department of Earth and Environmental Sciences and Lamont–Doherty Earth Observatory of Columbia University in Palisades, NY. She became a full professor in 2016. In her time at Columbia, she taught a variety of classes, including Introduction to Atmospheric Chemistry, Insights into Climate and Carbon Cycling from Simple Models, Dust in the Earth System, and Atmosphere Tutorial: Chemistry. In 2021 Fiore moved to Massachusetts Institute of Technology when she was named the first Peter H. Stone and Paola Malanotte Stone Professor in Earth, Atmospheric and Planetary Sciences.

Her fields of interest are air quality, climate change and variability, and atmospheric chemistry. She studies connections between the biosphere and the atmosphere, changes and patterns in atmospheric composition, and the relationship between climate and chemistry.

In addition to being a professor and researcher, Fiore participates in a numerous of professional activities. Since 2016 she has been the Principal Investigator with the NASA Health and Air Quality Applied Sciences Team. She has also been a member of the Board on Atmospheric Sciences and Climate of the National Academy of Sciences, the American Meteorological Society Statement on Atmospheric Ozone, the Steering Committee for NYSERDA-sponsored NESCAUM Workshop on New York City Metropolitan Area Energy and Air Quality Data Gaps, and the Steering Committee's IGAC/SPARC Chemistry-Climate Modeling Initiative since 2014, 2017, 2017, and 2013 respectively.

== Awards and honors ==
In December 2005, Fiore won the American Geophysical Union James R. Holton Junior Scientist Award for the research she conducted in the two years after earning her Ph.D. In July 2006, she earned the Presidential Early Career Award for Scientists and Engineers (PECASE). In December 2011, the American Geophysical Union awarded Fiore with the James B. Macelwane Medal, for her work in the geophysical sciences as an early career scientist. As specified by the Geophysical Union website, she met the criteria for the award with her high number of publications on atmospheric chemistry which aided to the scientific community's understanding of ozone pollution impacts. Since 2012, Fiore has received two grants from the United States Environmental Protection Agency to study U.S. air pollution and climate warming.

== Selected publications ==
Fiore has co-authored nearly 100 peer-reviewed publications, but the most highly cited are:

- Bey, Isabelle; Jacob, Daniel J.; Yantosca, Robert M.; Logan, Jennifer A.; Field, Brendan D.; Fiore, Arlene M.; Li, Qinbin; Liu, Honguy Y.; Mickley, Loretta J.; Schultz, Martin G. (2001). "Global modeling of tropospheric chemistry with assimilated meteorology: Model description and evaluation". Journal of Geophysical Research: Atmospheres. 106 (D19): 23073–23095. Bibcode:2001JGR...10623073B. doi:10.1029/2001JD000807.
- Dentener, F.; Drevet, J.; Lamarque, J. F.; Bey, I.; Eickhout, B.; Fiore, A. M.; Hauglustaine, D.; Horowitz, L. W.; Krol, M.; Kulshrestha, U. C.; Lawrence, M.; Galy-Lacaux, C.; Rast, S.; Shindell, D.; Stevenson, D.; Van Noije, T.; Atherton, C.; Bell, N.; Bergman, D.; Butler, T.; Cofala, J.; Collins, B.; Doherty, R.; Ellingsen, K.; Galloway, J.; Gauss, M.; Montanaro, V.; Müller, J. F.; Pitari, G.; et al. (2006). "Nitrogen and sulfur deposition on regional and global scales: A multimodel evaluation" (PDF). Global Biogeochemical Cycles. 20 (4): n/a. Bibcode:2006GBioC..20.4003D. doi:10.1029/2005GB002672. S2CID 839759.
- Kirtman, B; Power, SB; Adedoyin, AJ; Boer, GJ; Bojariu, R; Camilloni, I; Doblas-Reyes, F; Fiore, AM (2013). "Chapter 11 - Near-term climate change: Projections and predictability". Climate Change 2013: The Physical Science Basis. IPCC Working Group I Contribution to AR5. Cambridge: Cambridge University Press.
- Stevenson, D. S.; Dentener, F. J.; Schultz, M. G.; Ellingsen, K.; Van Noije, T. P. C.; Wild, O.; Zeng, G.; Amann, M.; Atherton, C. S.; Bell, N.; Bergmann, D. J.; Bey, I.; Butler, T.; Cofala, J.; Collins, W. J.; Derwent, R. G.; Doherty, R. M.; Drevet, J.; Eskes, H. J.; Fiore, A. M.; Gauss, M.; Hauglustaine, D. A.; Horowitz, L. W.; Isaksen, I. S. A.; Krol, M. C.; Lamarque, J.-F.; Lawrence, M. G.; Montanaro, V.; Müller, J.-F.; et al. (2006). "Multimodel ensemble simulations of present-day and near-future tropospheric ozone" (PDF). Journal of Geophysical Research. 111 (D8): D08301. Bibcode:2006JGRD..111.8301S. doi:10.1029/2005JD006338.
- Fiore, Arlene M. (2002). "Background ozone over the United States in summer: Origin, trend, and contribution to pollution episodes" (PDF). Journal of Geophysical Research. 107 (D15): 4275. Bibcode:2002JGRD..107.4275F. doi:10.1029/2001JD000982. S2CID 5377137.

== Public engagement ==
In 2002, Arlene Fiore cofounded Earth Science Women's Network (ESWN). Members of this organization lead workshops about career development and equality in the workplace for female students and professionals.
