= A Secular Age =

2007 book by Charles Taylor

- Author: Charles Taylor
- Language: English
- Subject: Social philosophy
- Publisher: Harvard University Press
- Publication date: 2007
- Media type: Print
- Pages: 874
- ISBN: 978-0-674-02676-6

A Secular Age is a book written by the philosopher Charles Taylor which was published in 2007 by Harvard University Press on the basis of Taylor's earlier Gifford Lectures (Edinburgh 1998–99). The noted sociologist Robert Bellah has referred to A Secular Age as "one of the most important books to be written in my lifetime."

== Background and overview ==
In recent years, secularity has become an important topic in the humanities and social sciences. Although there continue to be important disagreements among scholars, many begin with the premise that secularism is not simply the absence of religion, but rather an intellectual and political category that itself needs to be understood as a historical construction. In this book, Taylor looks at the change in Western society from a condition in which it was almost impossible not to believe in God, to one in which believing in God is simply one option of many. He argues against the view that secularity in society is caused by the rise of science and reason. He argues that this view is far too simplistic and does not explain why people would abandon their faith. Taylor starts with a description of the Middle Ages and presents the changes to bring about the modern secular age. The Middle Ages were a time of enchantment. People believed in God, angels, demons, witches, the Church's sacraments, relics, and sacred places. Each of these types of things had mysterious, real effects on individuals and society. The early Middle Ages were content to have two speeds for people's spiritual development. The clergy and a few others were at the faster, more intense speed. Everyone else was only expected to plod along at a slower spiritual speed. The High Middle Ages had a strong focus on bringing everyone along to a higher realm of spirituality and life.

Up until a few hundred years ago, the common viewpoint of the North Atlantic world was basically Christian. Most people could not even consider a viewpoint without God. The culture has changed so that multiple viewpoints are now conceivable to most people. This change is accomplished through three major facets of Deism: one, an anthropocentric shift in now conceiving of Nature as primarily for people; two, the idea that God relates to us primarily through an impersonal order that He established; and three, the idea that religion is to be understood from Nature by reason alone. Deism is considered the major intermediate step between the previous age of belief in God and the modern secular age. Three modes of secularity are distinguished: one, secularized public spaces; two, the decline of belief and practice; and three, cultural conditions where unbelief in religion is a viable option. This text focuses on secularity three.

In his previous work, Sources of the Self: The Making of Modern Identity, Taylor focused on the developments which led to the identity of modern individuals in the West. This work focuses on the developments which led to modern social structures. The content of Sources of the Self is complementary to A Secular Age. Taylor discussed the political implications of A Secular Age in an interview with The Utopian.

== Outline ==
=== Preface/Introduction ===
In his book, Taylor explores the concept of 'secularization' in the modern West and its relationship to religion, examining the different kinds of lived experiences involved in understanding one's life as a believer or unbeliever. He emphasizes that belief and unbelief are not rival theories, but different ways of experiencing life, and that both are reflective and contextualized. For believers, fullness is found in God, while for unbelievers, it is found in reason, nature, or inner depths. In the middle condition, daily activities between these extremes, meaning is created.

=== Part I: The Work of Reform ===
Taylor rejects the "subtraction" theory of secularization: that religion has been 'subtracted' (ie removed) from society. Rather, he argues that a movement of Reform in Christianity, which aimed to raise everyone up to the highest levels of religious devotion and practice, caused the move to secularization. This led to a disciplinary society that started to take action against rowdiness and indiscipline. The success of the project encouraged an anthropocentrism that opened the gates for a godless humanism. Taylor sees "three important forms of social self-understanding": the economy, the public sphere, and the practices and outlooks of democratic self-rule. Both the economy and the public sphere are conceived as existing independent of the political power.

=== Part II: The Turning Point ===
The program of Reform created a distance between humans and God, leading to the rise of exclusive humanism and a move away from traditional religion. The changing understanding of God in recent centuries is more complicated than just a move to an indifferent universe, and the motive force behind the Enlightenment's use of reason and science was reformed Christianity. The new epistemic predicament led to a shift towards exploring impersonal orders with disengaged reason and forming societies under the normative provisions of the Modern Moral Order, which represents a significant change in horizon.

=== Part III: The Nova Effect ===
Taylor outlines three stages of this shift: first, a move away from Christianity; second, a period of diversification that resulted in the rejection of humanism; and third, a move toward a culture of "authenticity" and "expressive individualism." Taylor notes that the secular age creates cross pressures, leading to the loss of heroism and a feeling of malaise. The belief in an impersonal universe arose from the advances in science and the new cosmic concept that promoted a materialist view of the world. Taylor also examines the impact of art and the emergence of a creative art that needs to establish its own reference points. He argues that this art creates a space for the spiritual and the deep for the unbeliever. Finally, Taylor notes the emergence of a new secular morality that places an emphasis on humanism, altruism, and duty, which created a rebellion among the younger generation at the end of the 19th century. This movement was shattered in World War I. Many went into the war celebrating the opportunity for "heroism and dedication" only to be "sent wholesale to death in a long, mechanized slaughter." (p. 417)

=== Part IV: Narratives of Secularization ===
==== The Age of Mobilization ====
Taylor challenges the notion of secularization by proposing an age of mobilization from 1800 to 1960 where religion evolved and recruited people on a large scale. The new forms of religion organized and inspired intense loyalty among people, and churches played a central role in people's lives. In France, the Church organized lay people in new bodies (e.g. Catholic Action), while in the Anglophone world, denominations like Methodists helped people cope with the market economy.

==== The Age of Authenticity ====
The modern West underwent a cultural revolution in the 1960s, ending the age of mobilization and replacing it with a culture of "authenticity" and "expressive" individualism.

This affects the social imaginary. To the "horizontal" notion of "the economy, the public sphere, and the sovereign people" (p. 481) is added a space of fashion, a culture of mutual display. The modern moral order of mutual benefit has been strengthened, mutual respect requires that "we shouldn't criticize each other's 'values'" (p. 484), in particular on sexual matters. Since "my" religious life or practice is my personal choice, my "link to the sacred" may not be embedded in "nation" or "church". This is a continuation of the Romantic move away from reason towards a "subtler language" (Shelley) to understand individual "spiritual insight/feeling." "Only accept what rings true to your own inner Self." (p. 489) This has "undermined the link between Christian faith and civilizational order." (p. 492)

The revolution in sexual behavior has broken the culture of moralism that dominated the last half millennium. Despite this, churches' codes and values are still out of touch with modern society's acceptance of sexuality, fluid gender roles, and identity issues.

==== Religion Today ====
Today, the "neo-Durkheimian embedding of religion in a state" (p. 505) and a "close interweaving of religion, life-style and patriotism" (p. 506) has been called into question. People are asking, like Peggy Lee, "Is that all there is?" They are heirs of the expressive revolution, "seeking a kind of unity and wholeness of the self... of the body and its pleasures... The stress is on unity, integrity, holism, individuality." (p. 507) This is often termed "spirituality" as opposed to "organized religion."

This has caused a breaking down of barriers between religious groups but also a decline in active practice and a loosening of commitment to orthodox dogmas. A move from an Age of Mobilization to an Age of Authenticity, it is a "retreat of Christendom". Fewer people will be "kept within a faith by some strong political or group identity," (p. 514) although a core (vast in the United States) will remain in neo-Durkheimian identities, with its potential for manipulation by such as "Milosevic, and the BJP." (p. 515)

Assuming that "the human aspiration to religion will [not] flag" (p. 515), spiritual practice will extend beyond ordinary church practice to involve meditation, charitable work, study groups, pilgrimage, special prayer, etc. It will be "unhooked" from the paleo-Durkheimian sacralized society, the neo-Durkheimian national identity, or center of "civilizational order", but still collective. "One develops a religious life." (p. 518)

While religious life continues, many people retain a nominal tie with the church, particularly in Western Europe. This "penumbra" seems to have diminished since 1960. More people stand outside belief, and no longer participate in rites of passage like church baptism and marriage. Yet people respond to, e.g. in France the 1500th anniversary of the baptism of Clovis, or in Sweden the loss of a trans-Baltic ferry. Religion "remains powerful in memory; but also as a kind of reserve fund of spiritual force or consolation." (p. 522)

This distancing is not experienced in the United States. This may be (1) because immigrants used church membership as a way to establish themselves: "Go to the church of your choice, but go." (p. 524) Or (2) it may be the difficulty that the secular elite has in imposing its "social imaginary" on the rest of society vis-a-vis hierarchical Europe. Also (3) the U.S. never had an ancien régime, so there has never been a reaction against the state church. Next (4) the groups in the U.S. have reacted strongly against the post-1960s culture, unlike Europe. A majority of Americans remain happy in "one Nation under God". There are fewer skeletons in the family closet, and "it is easier to be unreservedly confident in your own rightness when you are the hegemonic power." (p. 528) Finally (5) the U.S. has provided experimental models of post-Durkheimian religion at least for a century.

After summarizing his argument, Taylor looks to the future, which might follow the slow reemergence of religion in Russia in people raised in the "wasteland" of militant atheism, but suddenly grabbed by God, or it might follow the "spiritual but not religious" phenomenon in the West. "In any case, we are just at the beginning of a new age of religious searching, whose outcome no one can foresee."

=== Part V: Conditions of Belief ===
We live in an immanent frame. That is the consequence of the story Taylor has told, in disenchantment and the creation of the buffered self and the inner self, the invention of privacy and intimacy, the disciplined self, individualism. Then Reform, the breakup of the cosmic order and higher time in secular, making the best of clock time as a limited resource. The immanent frame can be open, allowing for the possibility of the transcendent, or closed. Taylor argues that both arguments are "spin" and "involve a step beyond available reasons into the realm of anticipatory confidence" (p. 551) or faith.

There are several Closed World Structures that assume the immanent frame. One is the idea of the rational agent of modern epistemology. Another is the idea that religion is childish, so "An unbeliever has the courage to take up an adult stance and face reality." (p. 562) Taylor argues that the Closed World Structures do not really argue their worldviews, they "function as unchallenged axioms" (p. 590) and it just becomes very hard to understand why anyone would believe in God.

Living in the immanent frame, "The whole culture experiences cross pressures, between the draw of the narratives of closed immanence on one side, and the sense of their inadequacy on the other." (p. 595) Materialists respond to the aesthetic experience of poetry. Theists agree with the Modern Moral Order and its agenda of universal human rights and welfare. Romantics "react against the disciplined, buffered self" (p. 609) that seems to sacrifice something essential with regard to feelings and bodily existence.

To resolve the modern cross pressures and dilemmas, Taylor proposes a "maximal demand" that we define our moral aspirations in terms that do not "crush, mutilate or deny what is essential to our humanity". (p. 640) It aspires to wholeness and transcendence yet also tries to "fully respect ordinary human flourishing." (p. 641)

Taylor imagines a two-dimensional moral space. The horizontal gives you a "point of resolution, the fair award." (p. 706) The vertical hopes to rise higher, to reestablish trust, "to overcome fear by offering oneself to it; responding with love and forgiveness, thereby tapping a source of goodness, and healing" (p. 708) and forgoing the satisfaction of moral victory over evil in sacred violence, religious or secular.

Taylor examines the Unquiet Frontiers of Modernity, how we follow the Romantic search for fullness, yet seem to respond still to our religious heritage. We replace the old "higher time" with autobiography, history, and commemoration. Many moderns are uncomfortable with death, "the giving up of everything." (p. 725)

"Our age is very far from settling into a comfortable unbelief." (p. 727) "The secular age is schizophrenic, or better, deeply cross-pressured." (p. 727) Against unbelief, Taylor presents a selection of recent spiritual conversions or "epiphanic" experiences in Catholic artists and writers, including Václav Havel, Ivan Illich, Charles Péguy, and Gerard Manley Hopkins. The path to the future is a rich variety of paths to God in a unity of the church and a new approach to the question of the sexual/sensual. The disciplined, disengaged secular world is challenged by a return to the body in Pentecostalism. There is a "profound interpenetration of eros and the spiritual life." (p. 767) "[I]n our religious lives we are responding to a transcendent reality." (p. 768) Our seeking for "fullness" is our response to it.

Secular belief is a shutting out. "The door is barred against further discovery." (p. 769) But in the secular "'waste land'... young people will begin again to explore beyond the boundaries." (p. 770) It will, Taylor believes, involve a move away from "excarnation", the disembodying of spiritual life, and from homogenization in a single principle, to celebrate the "integrity of different ways of life." (p. 772)

=== Epilogue: The Many Stories ===
In a brief afterword, Taylor links his narrative to similar efforts by e.g., John Milbank and the radical orthodoxy movement, while also elucidating the distinctiveness of his own approach. He calls the tale told by radical orthodoxy thinkers the "Intellectual Deviation" story, which focuses on "changes in theoretical understanding, mainly among learned and related élites," (p. 774) whereas the story he relates, which he names the "Reform Master Narrative," is more concerned with how secularity "emerges as a mass phenomenon." (p. 775) Both these stories are complementary, "exploring different sides of the same mountain." (p. 775) In his review of the book, Milbank agreed that Taylor's thesis "...is more fundamental... because the most determining processes are fusions of ideas and practices, not ideas in isolation.

== Criticism ==
Charles Larmore was critical of A Secular Age in its approach, especially with it having too many references to Catholic theologians and a noticeable absence of Protestant figures (see section I paragraph 7 within the cited article). Larmore also sees A Secular Age offering nothing new and is simply an extension of Max Weber's work on secularization theory (Section II, paragraph 1) with Weber and Taylor having differences that may be attributable to Weber being "a lapsed Protestant" and Taylor being "an ardent Catholic" (section II, paragraph 2). Larmore feels Taylor, in his book, may have an adequate basis for jumping to metaphysical or religious conclusions concerning the understanding of a secular view of the world, but to do so is "precisely what we ought not to do" (Section II, paragraph 5). Larmore disagrees with Taylor's insistence that people, having adequate information, should take a stance on God's presence throughout the world (Section II, paragraph 7). In Larmore's opinion, Taylor is wrong in not recognizing that "We have never been, and we will never be, at one with ourselves" and, therefore, should not jump to conclusions that are based on faith - which Larmore believes Taylor did in his book (Section II, paragraph 12).

== Reviews ==
A Secular Age has been reviewed in newspapers such as The New York Times and The Guardian, magazines such as The New Republic and The American Prospect, and professional journals such as Intellectual History Review, Political Theory, Implicit Religion, and European Journal of Sociology.
