= Malaise (disambiguation) =

In medicine, malaise is a feeling of discomfort.

Malaise may also refer to:

- Malaise trap
- Malaise era, an era of poor-quality cars in the United States from the 1970s-1980s
- Post-exertional malaise
- Malaise Créole
- The Malaise of Modernity
- The Great Malaise
- Un Certain Malaise
- Malaise (surname), name list
- Malaise Castle
- Malaise speech
- Elephant Micah and the Agrarian Malaise
