= Klaus Töpfer =

German politician (1938–2024)

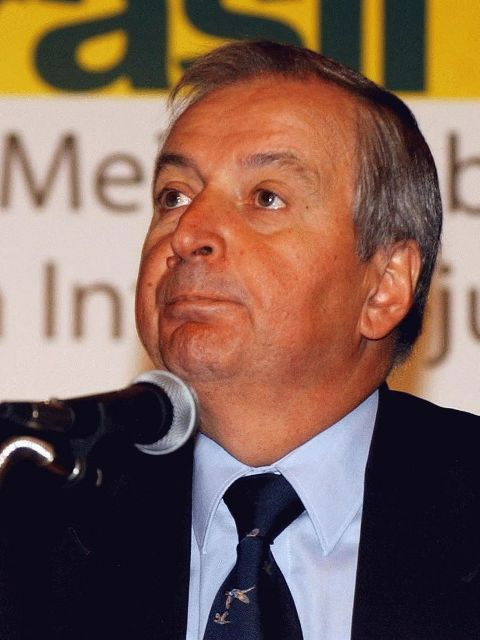
- Töpfer in 2003

4th Executive Director of the United Nations Environment Programme
- In office 15 January 1998 – 31 March 2006
- Secretary-General: Kofi Annan
- Preceded by: Elizabeth Dowdeswell
- Succeeded by: Achim Steiner

Minister for Regional Planning, Building and Urban Development
- In office 17 November 1994 – 14 January 1998
- Chancellor: Helmut Kohl
- Preceded by: Irmgard Schwaetzer
- Succeeded by: Eduard Oswald

Minister for the Environment, Nature Conservation, and Reactor Security
- In office 22 April 1987 – 17 November 1994
- Chancellor: Helmut Kohl
- Preceded by: Walter Wallmann
- Succeeded by: Angela Merkel
Parliamentary constituencies
Member of the Bundestag for Saarland
In office 20 December 1990 – 28 February 1998
Preceded by	multi-member district
Succeeded by	Annegret Kramp-Karrenbauer

Personal details
- Born: Klaus Töpfer; 29 July 1938 Waldenburg/Schlesien, Gau Silesia, Germany (now Wałbrzych, Poland)
- Died: 8 June 2024 (aged 85) Munich, Bavaria, Germany
- Party: Christian Democratic Union (1972–2024)
- Children: 3
- Education: University of Münster
- Occupation: Politician; Businessman; Civil Servant; Academic Assistant
- Other offices held: 2009–2015: Director, Institute for Advanced Sustainability Studies

Klaus Töpfer (29 July 1938 – 8 June 2024) was a German politician (CDU) and environmental politics expert. From 1998 to 2006 he was executive director of the United Nations Environment Programme (UNEP).

== Personal life ==
Töpfer was born in Waldenburg, Silesia. He studied economics in Mainz, Frankfurt and Münster. In 1968 he earned his doctorate at the University of Münster. Töpfer died on 8 June 2024, at the age of 85.

== Early career ==
In 1971, Töpfer was appointed Head of Planning and Information of the Federal State of Saarland, a post he held until 1978. During that time, he also served as a visiting professor at the Academy of Administrative Sciences in Speyer, and consulted several countries on development policy, among them Egypt, Brazil and Jordan. He spent the following year at the University of Hannover as Professor and Director of the Institute for Spatial Research and Planning.

== Political career ==
In 1985, Töpfer became State Minister for the Environment and Health in the government of Minister-President Bernhard Vogel of Rhineland-Palatinate.

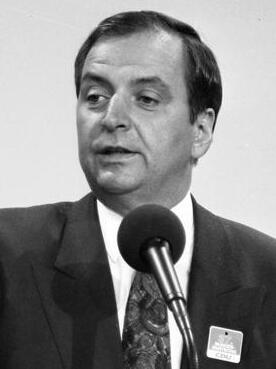
Töpfer in 1989

In 1987, Töpfer became Federal Minister for the Environment, Nature Conservation and Nuclear Safety under Chancellor Helmut Kohl. During his time in office, Germany established the Federal Office for Radiation Protection as a response to the Chernobyl disaster and the Transnuklear scandal.

From 1994 to 1998 he served as Federal Minister for Regional Planning, Civil Engineering and Urban Development. He was a member of the Bundestag from 1990 to 1998 and a member of the Steering Committee of the CDU from 1992 to 1998.

In 1998, Töpfer was appointed Under Secretary General of the United Nations, General Director of the United Nations office in Nairobi and Executive Director of the United Nations Environment Programme. Among the milestones of his eight-year tenure are a number of important environmental agreements, including the Cartagena Protocol on Biosafety and the Stockholm Convention on Persistent Organic Pollutants. Töpfer was also closely involved in behind-the-scenes negotiations in support of the Kyoto Protocol on climate change. In June 2006 he was succeeded in this office by Achim Steiner. As director of UNEP, he had a key role in gauging and attempting to remedy the environmental costs of the 2004 Asian tsunami.

== Later career ==
In 2009 Töpfer was appointed founding director of the Institute for Advanced Sustainability Studies (IASS) which performs research between climate problems and sustainable economics. This institute is located at Potsdam, Germany. The institute's funding is provided by the federal government of Germany Federal Ministry of Education and Research (Germany).

Töpfer was rumored as a possible successor to the German presidency after Christian Wulff's resignation. He later served as co-chairman of the Federal Government's Ethics Commission on a Safe Energy Supply.

From 2013 Töpfer headed the project "DEMOENERGY – The Transformation of the Energy System as the Engine for Democratic Innovations" together with Claus Leggewie and Patrizia Nanz (both Institute for Advanced Study in the Humanities Essen, Germany). In 2016, the United Nations Economic and Social Council (ECOSOC) appointed Töpfer as co-chairman (alongside Juan Somavia) of an Independent Team of Advisors on positioning the UN development system for the Sustainable Development Goals.

In 2018, Energy Community appointed Töpfer to serve as a mediator in an energy dispute between Kosovo and Serbia.

== Other activities ==
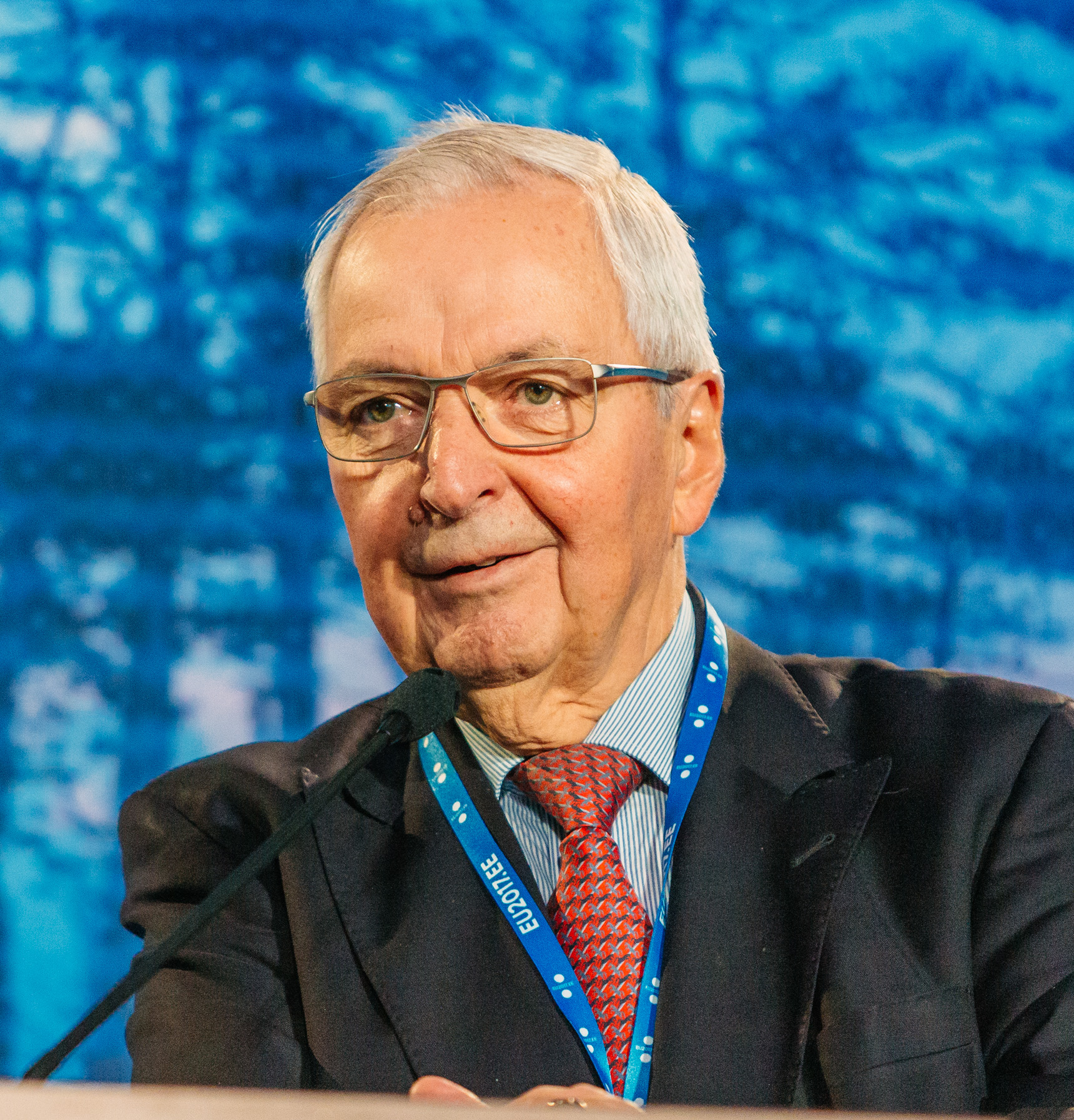
Töpfer at Potsdam in 2017

=== Corporate boards ===
- Theva, Member of the Senior Advisory Council (from 2017)
- Porsche, Member of the Sustainability Advisory Board (from 2016)
- ProSiebenSat.1 Media, Member of the Advisory Board (from 2011)
- Deutsche Bank, Member of the Climate Change Advisory Board (2011)
- Volkswind Gruppe, Member of the Advisory Board (2009–2015)

=== Non-profit organizations ===
- atmosfair, Patron
- Stiftung Zukunftsfähigkeit, Member of the Advisory Board
- Helmholtz Association of German Research Centres, Member of the Senate (2007–2009)
- Institute for Energy Efficiency in Production (EEP), University of Stuttgart, Member of the Advisory Board
- German Foundation for World Population (DSW), Member of the Advisory Board
- German-Russian Raw Materials Forum, Patron
- Holcim Foundation for Sustainable Construction, Member of the Board
- Agora Energiewende, Chairman of the Council (2013–2018)
- German Council for Sustainable Development (RNE), Member (2001–2010, appointed ad personam by Chancellor Gerhard Schröder)
