= Institute for Advanced Sustainability Studies =

German research institute

Coordinates: 52°24′21.9″N 13°4′24.4″E

Research Institute for Sustainability
- Category: Research institute
- Legal structure: Registered association
- Established: 2 February 2009
- Location: Potsdam, Germany
- Leadership: Katja Carson (Administration), Prof. Dr Mark Lawrence, Prof. Dr Patrizia Nanz, Prof. Dr Ortwin Renn
- Fields of research: energy transitions, emerging technologies, climate change, air quality, systemic risks, governance and participation, cultures of transformation in the Anthropocene, and sustainable development
- Funding mix: Federal Government (85%), State of Brandenburg (15%)
- Staff: approx. 120
- Homepage: www.rifs-potsdam.de/en

The Research Institute for Sustainability (RIFS) in Potsdam, Germany, previously known as the Institute for Advanced Sustainability Studies (IASS), is affiliated with the Helmholtz Association through the GFZ German Research Centre for Geosciences. RIFS collaborates with various stakeholders, including researchers, governmental bodies, the private sector, and civil society, to address sustainability challenges. Its research covers climate change mitigation, sustainable governance, and cultural transformations in the Anthropocene. RIFS also offers a Fellow Program.

== Organization ==
RIFS employs approximately 120 people from over 30 countries. The institute's research program is overseen by its scientific directors, Doris Fuchs and Mark Lawrence, who are in turn advised by the institute's advisory board and the department heads for each research division. RIFS receives funding from the German Federal Ministry for Education and Research (85%) and Federal State of Brandenburg (15%). According to the institute's website, research is divided into three areas: environmental politics, human environmental impact and damage mitigation, and inter-disciplinary cooperation; a fellowship program is attached to all three areas.

== History ==
The IASS (now RIFS) was founded in Potsdam, Germany on February 2, 2009. Klaus Töpfer served as the institute's founding executive director until September 2015, with scientific directors Carlo Rubbia (June 2010 – May 2015) and Mark G. Lawrence (from October 2011).

In January 2023, the IASS merged with the Helmholtz Association. It was renamed the Research Institute for Sustainability (RIFS) and incorporated into the German Research Centre for Geosciences (GFZ).

== Publications ==
RIFS uses several publication formats to disseminate its findings and policy recommendations. These include:

- RIFS Policy Briefs – Policy recommendations and assessments.
- RIFS Fact Sheets—Brief overviews of research relating to topics addressed by the Institute.
- RIFS Studies—Detailed research findings addressing a central issue.
- RIFS Working Paper—Interim research findings and interventions in current debates.
