= The Malaise of Modernity =

1991 book by Charles Taylor

- Cover of a House of Anansi Press edition
- Author: Charles Taylor
- Language: English
- Subject: Ethics; social philosophy
- Publisher: House of Anansi Press; Harvard University Press
- Publication date: 1991
- Publication place: Canada
- Media type: Print; digital
- Pages: 135
- ISBN: 978-0-88784-520-8
- LC Class: BF637.S4 T39

The Malaise of Modernity is a book by the Canadian philosopher Charles Taylor based on his 1991 Massey Lecture of the same title. Originally published by House of Anansi Press, it was republished by Harvard University Press with the title The Ethics of Authenticity.

== See also ==
- Authenticity (philosophy)
- The Closing of the American Mind
- The Culture of Narcissism
- Modernity
- Sources of the Self
