= Malaise (surname) =

Malaise is a surname. Notable people with the surname include:

- Ferdinand von Malaisé (1806–1892), Bavarian soldier
- René Malaise (1892–1978), Swedish entomologist, explorer, art collector and inventor

== See also ==
- Malaise
- Malaise (disambiguation)
