= Edward Wentworth Beatty =

Canadian transportation executive and philanthropist

Sir Edward Beatty GBE KC
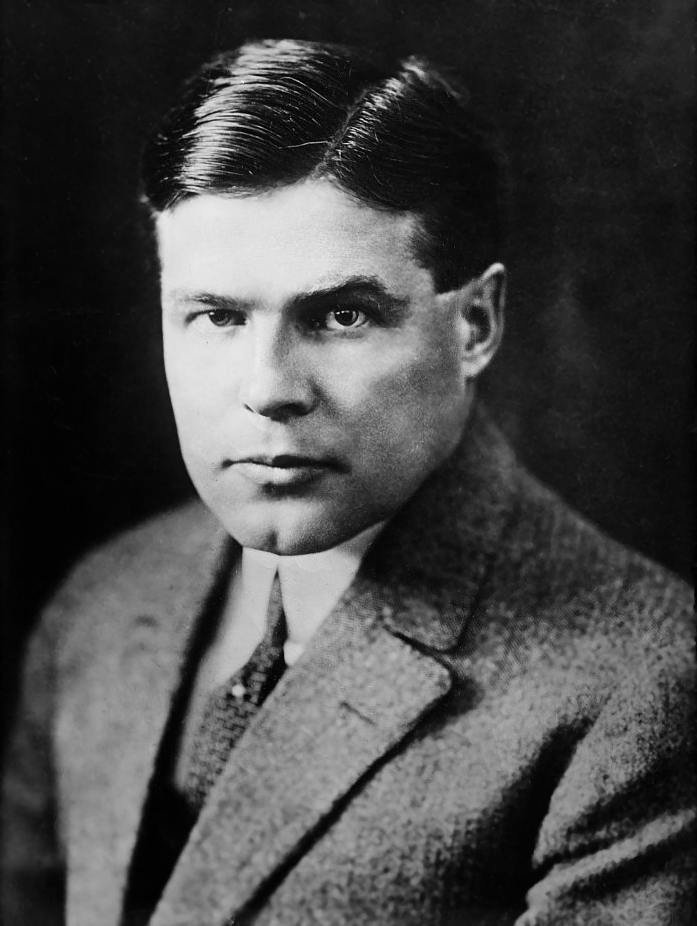
- Beatty circa 1918

President of Canadian Pacific Railway
- In office 1918–1943
- Preceded by: Lord Shaughnessy
- Succeeded by: D'Alton Corry Coleman

Chancellor of Queen's University
- In office 1919–1923
- Preceded by: James Douglas
- Succeeded by: Sir Robert Laird Borden

6th Chancellor of McGill University
- In office 1920–1943
- Preceded by: Sir Robert Laird Borden
- Succeeded by: Morris Watson Wilson

Personal details
- Born: October 16, 1877 Thorold, Ontario
- Died: March 23, 1943 (aged 65) Montreal, Quebec
- Education: Osgoode Hall Law School

Sir Edward Wentworth Beatty (October 16, 1877 – March 23, 1943) was the first Canadian-born president of the Canadian Pacific Railway (1918–1943). He was responsible for building the Royal York Hotel and RMS Empress of Britain, and later helped establish Canadian Pacific Air Lines. During World War II, he co-ordinated Canadian shipping and rail transport before ill health forced him to retire. He was Chancellor of Queen's University (1919–1923) and chancellor of McGill University (1920–1943). A lifelong philanthropist, on his death he left half of his estate to charity. He left his home in Montreal's Golden Square Mile to McGill, and it was known as Beatty Hall for 70 years until its sale in 2016.

== Early life ==
Born at Thorold, Ontario, he was the son of Henry Beatty (1834–1913) and Harriet Minerva Powell (1844–1916). His mother was a member of the Masseys family (maternal grandmother Elvira Deborah Massey was daughter of Daniel Massey and niece of Hart Massey of Massey Ferguson). Beatty's grandfather James Beatty (~1800-1887), a Protestant from Ireland emigrated to Thorold with his brother (a trained Land surveyor) in 1835, purchasing land on which they built a Grist mill, leather tannery and sawmill. By 1863, the Beattys had purchased the Parry Sound estate to add to the timber supplies needed for their enterprises at Thorold. In order to ship the timber between their two properties they established the Georgian Bay Transit Company, which Henry Beatty took control of in 1865, and transformed it into the Beatty Line of Steamships which later expanded to operate on the Great Lakes. Henry Beatty was described as "a man of unusual executive ability and vision", qualities that his son, Edward, inherited in no small dose.

Edward Beatty was educated at Upper Canada College and the University of Toronto, earning his law degree from the Osgoode Hall Law School in 1898. For the next three years he articled with the Toronto law firm of McCarthy, Osler, Hoskin & Creelman.

== Canadian Pacific Railway, Steamships & Air Lines ==
Beatty's father's steam line was bought out by the Canadian Pacific Railway for transportation across the Great Lakes and his vessels became the nucleus of the CPR's trans-Atlantic steam line, Canadian Pacific Steamships. Henry Beatty remained as marine advisor to the CPR after his retirement in 1892, and it was through this connection that Edward came to the attention of the CPR and was appointed as their general counsel in 1901. On the retirement of the CPR's Lord Shaughnessy in 1918, Beatty was chosen to be his successor as president and executive chief of the world's greatest transportation system, just before his 41st birthday. Beatty's lifetime ambition had been to become a judge, and he at first refused the significant promotion. He was the first Canadian-born president of the CPR, a position he held until his death in 1943, and assumed the monumental task of managing the destiny of the great railway and steamship line.

Lord Mount Stephen was seen as the organizer of the CPR; Sir William Van Horne as the builder; Lord Shaughnessy as the expander, and Sir Edward Beatty as the modernizer. During his term as president, Beatty was involved in building the Royal York Hotel, the RMS Empress of Britain II and Canadian Pacific Airlines. Edward Beatty saw the CPR through peak periods as well as the depression. In the boom years the CPR spent many millions in improving its enormous and diverse property holdings. Edward Beatty was always a believer in the great future of the Canadian West, and he was an inspiration to young Canada.

== Contributions to education in Canada ==
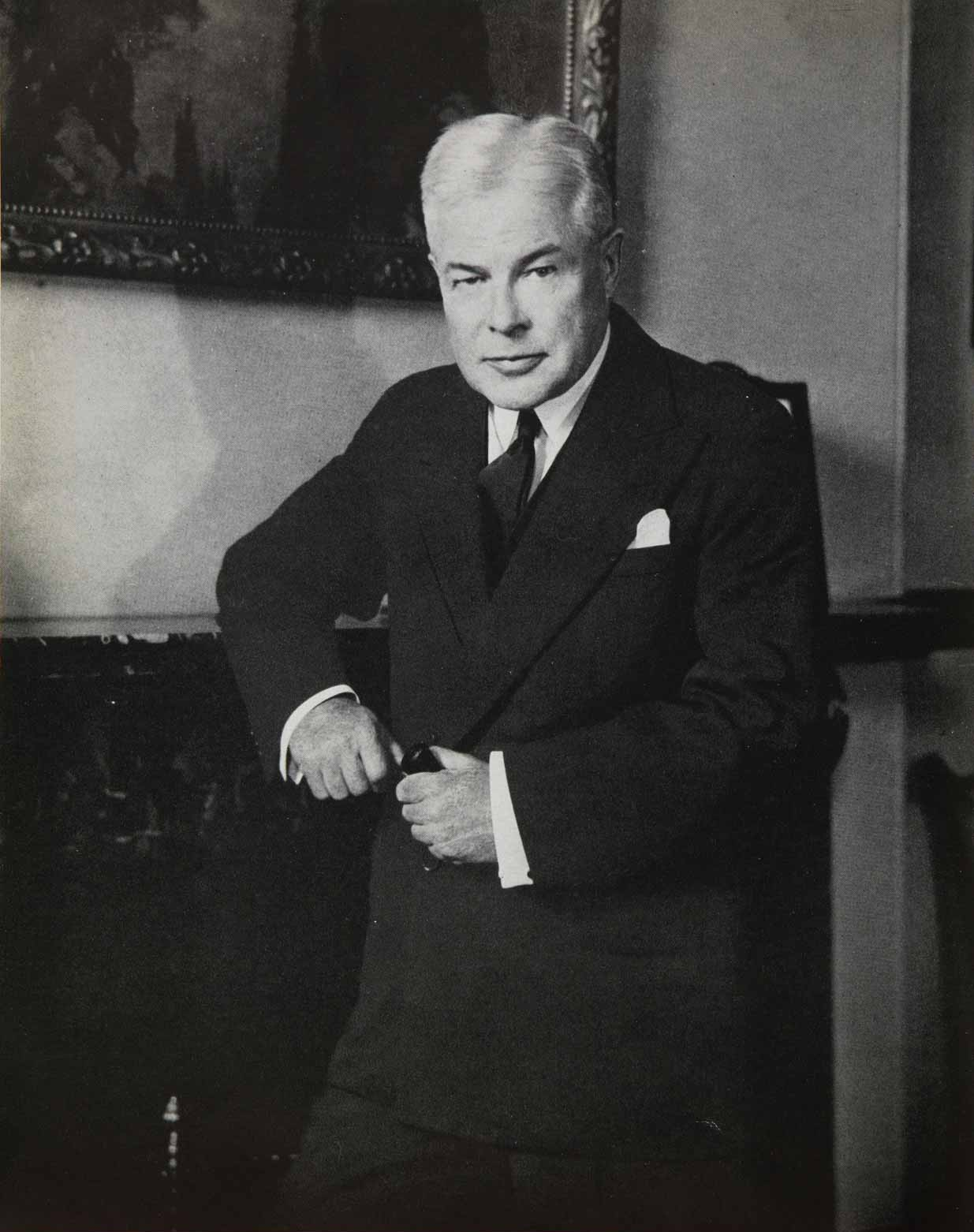
Beatty in 1940

He was best known as chancellor of McGill University, a position he held from 1921 until his death. In 1919, Beatty had been elected chancellor of Queen's University in Kingston, Ontario, retiring in 1923. He was elected a member of the Corporation of Bishop's University in Lennoxville, Quebec. From 1927 he served as a governor of Lower Canada College in Montreal and was chairman of the Rhodes Scholarship selection committee for the Province of Quebec. His home on Pine Avenue in the Golden Square Mile of Montreal was named 'Beatty Hall' shortly after becoming part of McGill University in 1946. He was also an early and enthusiastic supporter and donator to Martha Allan's Montreal Repertory Theatre.

Honorary degrees were conferred on him by leading universities in Canada, Ireland, Scotland and the United States. Internationally these included Trinity College Dublin, University of St Andrews, Dartmouth College and New York University. In Canada they included: McGill University, University of Toronto, Bishop's University, McMaster University, University of Western Ontario, University of New Brunswick, Queen's University, and University of Alberta.

== Contributions to sports in Canada ==
Amateur Athletic Union of Canada president Jack Hamilton appointed Beatty chairman of the committee to oversee preparations for the Canadian delegation to the 1938 British Empire Games.

== World War II ==
On the outbreak of World War II, Beatty had the CPR "fighting fit" and he placed its full resources at the disposal of the country and the British Empire, and it delivered. From 1939 until the end of 1941, Beatty was Canadian representative for the Ministry of War Transport of the United Kingdom, charged with getting supplies to the battle zones. Later, under his direction, Canadian Pacific Air Services was organized to initiate the transatlantic ferrying of Bombers to Great Britain, a service taken over later by the Royal Air Force, first under Ferry Command, and then under Transport Command.

== Death ==
He died on March 23, 1943, in Montreal, Quebec.

== Honours ==
He was made a Knight Grand Cross of the Order of the British Empire by King George V in 1935, and in the same year he was made Honorary Bencher of the Middle Temple, London. Other honours included: Knight Commander First Class of the Order of St. Olav (1924) and Knight of Grace the Venerable Order of St. John of Jerusalem (1934). In 1930, Beatty and his great friend and Chief Counsel to the CPR, F.E. Meredith, were received at the White House as guests of President Herbert Hoover. In 1931, Beatty received an honorary Legum Doctor (LL.D.) from McGill University.

In 1937, the Royal Canadian Navy honoured him with the first honorary rank it ever created, a commission as honorary captain, Montreal division of the Royal Canadian Naval Volunteer Reserve. Two years previously, Lord Baden-Powell presented him with the Order of the Silver Wolf, the highest honorary award possible on behalf of the Boy Scouts Association of Canada, for which he had served as president. His interest in youth training had a practical application in the constant support he gave to movements concerned with the reclamation of wayward boys, particularly the Shawbridge Boys' Farm, for which he also served as president.

In 1943 the "Distinguished Civic Service Award" for 1942 in Montreal was presented posthumously to him by the City Improvement League of Montreal, one of the many projects for city betterment to which Beatty gave so generously and turned his talents towards. The Beatty Lectures occur every year at McGill University in his honour.

Business positions
Preceded by Thomas Shaughnessy	President of Canadian Pacific Railway Limited; 1918 – 1943	Succeeded by D'Alton Corry Coleman
Academic offices
Preceded by James Douglas	Chancellor of Queen's University; 1918–1923	Succeeded by Robert Borden
Preceded by Robert Borden	Chancellor of McGill University; 1921–1942	Succeeded by Morris Watson Wilson
