= Michael E. Rosen =

British political philosopher (born 1952)

- Born: Michael Eric Rosen; 11 May 1952 (age 74)

Academic background
- Education: Balliol College, Oxford
- Thesis: The Rationality of Hegel's Dialectic and Its Criticism (1980)
- Doctoral advisor: Charles Taylor

Academic work
- Discipline: Philosophy
- Sub-discipline: Political philosophy
- Institutions: Magdalen College, Oxford; Harvard University; Merton College, Oxford; University College London; Lincoln College, Oxford

Michael Eric Rosen (born 11 May 1952) is a British political philosopher active in the traditions of analytic philosophy and continental European intellectual thought. He is best known for his work on Hegel and the Frankfurt School. He is currently the Senator Joseph S. Clark Professor of Government at Harvard University.

== Career ==
Rosen holds a Bachelor of Arts degree with first-class honours in philosophy, awarded in 1974, and a Doctor of Philosophy degree awarded in 1980, both from Balliol College, Oxford. He was a lecturer in politics at Magdalen College, Oxford, from 1980 to 1981, an assistant professor of philosophy at Harvard University from 1981 to 1982, a special fellow in politics at Merton College, Oxford, from 1982 to 1985, and a lecturer in philosophy at University College London from 1986 to 1990. He then joined Lincoln College, Oxford, before taking his current post in Harvard's Government Department.

Charles Taylor advised Rosen's doctoral thesis, “The Rationality of Hegel’s Dialectic and Its Critics". While at Oxford, he co-chaired the Hegel and Marx graduate seminar with his friend, the late G. A. Cohen.

== Works ==
- Michael Rosen (2012). Dignity: Its History and Meaning. Harvard University Press. ISBN 978-0-674-06443-0.
- Justin Wintle, ed. (2002). "Hegel". Makers of nineteenth century culture: 1800-1914. Routledge. ISBN 978-0-415-26584-3.
- Michael Rosen (1996). On Voluntary Servitude. ISBN 0-674-63779-8.
- Michael Rosen (1982). Hegel's Dialectic and its Criticism. Cambridge University Press. ISBN 0-521-24484-6.
