= Secularity =

State of being separate from religion

Secularity or secularness (from Latin sæculum, 'worldly' or 'of a generation' or 'century') is the state of being unrelated to or neutral in regard to religion.

The origins of secularity as a concept can be traced to the Bible, and it was fleshed out through Christian history into the modern era. Since the Middle Ages, there have been clergy not pertaining to a religious order called "secular clergy". Furthermore, secular and religious entities were not separated in the medieval period, but coexisted and interacted naturally.

"Secular", like "religion", is a modern Western term and concept that is not universal across cultures, languages, or time. In western cultures, things not connected with religion may be considered secular, in other words, neutral to religion. Secularity does not mean 'anti-religious', but 'unrelated to religion'. Many activities in religious bodies are secular, and though there are multiple types of secularity or secularization, most do not lead to irreligiosity. Linguistically, a process by which anything becomes secular is named secularization, though the term is mainly reserved for the secularization of society; any concept or ideology promoting the secular may be termed secularism, a term generally applied to the ideology dictating no religious influence on the public sphere.

== Definitions ==
Historically, the word secular was not related or linked to religion, but was a freestanding term in Latin that would relate to any mundane endeavour. However, the term, saecula saeculorum (saeculōrum being the genitive plural of saeculum) as found in the New Testament in the Vulgate translation (c. 410) of the original Koine Greek phrase εἰς τοὺς αἰῶνας τῶν αἰώνων (eis toùs aionas ton aiṓnōn), e.g. at Galatians 1:5, was used in the early Christian church (and is still used today), in the doxologies, to denote the coming and going of the ages, the grant of eternal life, and the long duration of created things from their beginning to forever and ever. Secular and secularity derive from the Latin word saeculum which meant 'of a generation, belonging to an age' or denoted a period of about one hundred years. The Christian doctrine that God exists outside time led medieval Western culture to use secular to indicate separation from specifically religious affairs and involvement in temporal ones.

== Modern and historical understandings of the term ==
Secular does not necessarily imply hostility or rejection of God or religion, though some use the term this way (see "secularism", below); Martin Luther used to speak of "secular work" as a vocation from God for most Christians. Secular has been a part of the Christian church's history, which even developed in the medieval period secular clergy, priests who were defined as the Church's geographically-delimited diocesan clergy and not a part of the diasporal monastic orders. This arrangement continues today. The Waldensians advocated for secularity by separation of church and state. According to cultural anthropologists such as Jack David Eller, secularity is best understood not as being "anti-religious", but as being "religiously neutral" since many activities in religious bodies are secular themselves, and most versions of secularity do not lead to irreligiosity.

The idea of a dichotomy between religion and the secular originated in the European Enlightenment. Furthermore, both "religion" and "secular" are Western terms and concepts that are not universal across cultures, languages, or time. Since both are Western concepts that were formed under the influence of Christian theology, other cultures do not necessarily have words or concepts that resemble or are equivalent to them. Many scholars have problematized the concept of secularity, arguing that it has been heavily structured by Protestant models of Christianity such as emphasis of beliefs and skepticism towards rituals. Of the cultures that do have conceptions of "religion" and "secular", most do not have tension or dichotomous views of religion and secularity.

One can regard eating and bathing as examples of secular activities, because there may not be anything inherently religious about them. Nevertheless, some religious traditions see both eating and bathing as sacraments, therefore making them religious activities within those world views. Saying a prayer derived from religious text or doctrine, worshipping through the context of a religion, performing corporal and spiritual works of mercy, and attending a religious seminary school or monastery are examples of religious (non-secular) activities.

In many cultures, there is little dichotomy between "natural" and "supernatural", "religious" and "not-religious", especially since people have beliefs in other supernatural or spiritual things irrespective of belief in God or gods. Other cultures stress practice of ritual rather than belief. Conceptions of both "secular" and "religious", while sometimes having some parallels in local cultures, were generally imported along with Western worldviews, often in the context of colonialism. Attempts to define either the "secular" or the "religious" in non-Western societies, accompanying local modernization and Westernization processes, were often and still are fraught with tension. Due to all these factors, secular as a general term of reference was much deprecated in social sciences, and is used carefully and with qualifications.

=== Taylorian secularity ===
Philosopher Charles Taylor in his 2007 book A Secular Age understands and discusses the secularity of Western societies less in terms of how much of a role religion plays in public life (secularity 1), or how religious a society's individual members are (secularity 2), than as a "backdrop" or social context in which religious belief is no longer taken as a given (secularity 3). For Taylor, this third sense of secularity is the unique historical condition in which virtually all individuals – religious or not – have to contend with the fact that their values, morality, or sense of life's meaning are no longer underpinned by communally-accepted religious facts. All religious beliefs or irreligious philosophical positions are, in a secular society, held with an awareness that there are a wide range of other contradictory positions available to any individual; belief in general becomes a different type of experience when all particular beliefs are optional. A plethora of competing religious and irreligious worldviews open up, each rendering the other more "fragile". This condition in turn entails for Taylor that even clearly religious beliefs and practices are experienced in a qualitatively different way when they occur in a secular social context. In Taylor's sense of the term, a society could in theory be highly "secular" even if nearly all of its members believed in a deity or even subscribed to a particular religious creed; secularity here has to do with the conditions, not the prevalence, of belief, and these conditions are understood to be shared across a given society, irrespective of belief or lack thereof.

Taylor's thorough account of secularity as a socio-historical condition, rather than the absence or diminished importance of religion, has been highly influential in subsequent philosophy of religion and sociology of religion, particularly as older sociological narratives about secularisation, desecularisation, and disenchantment have come under increased criticism.

== See also ==
- Secular morality
- Secular ethics
