= Patrizia Nanz =

German political scientist (born 1965)

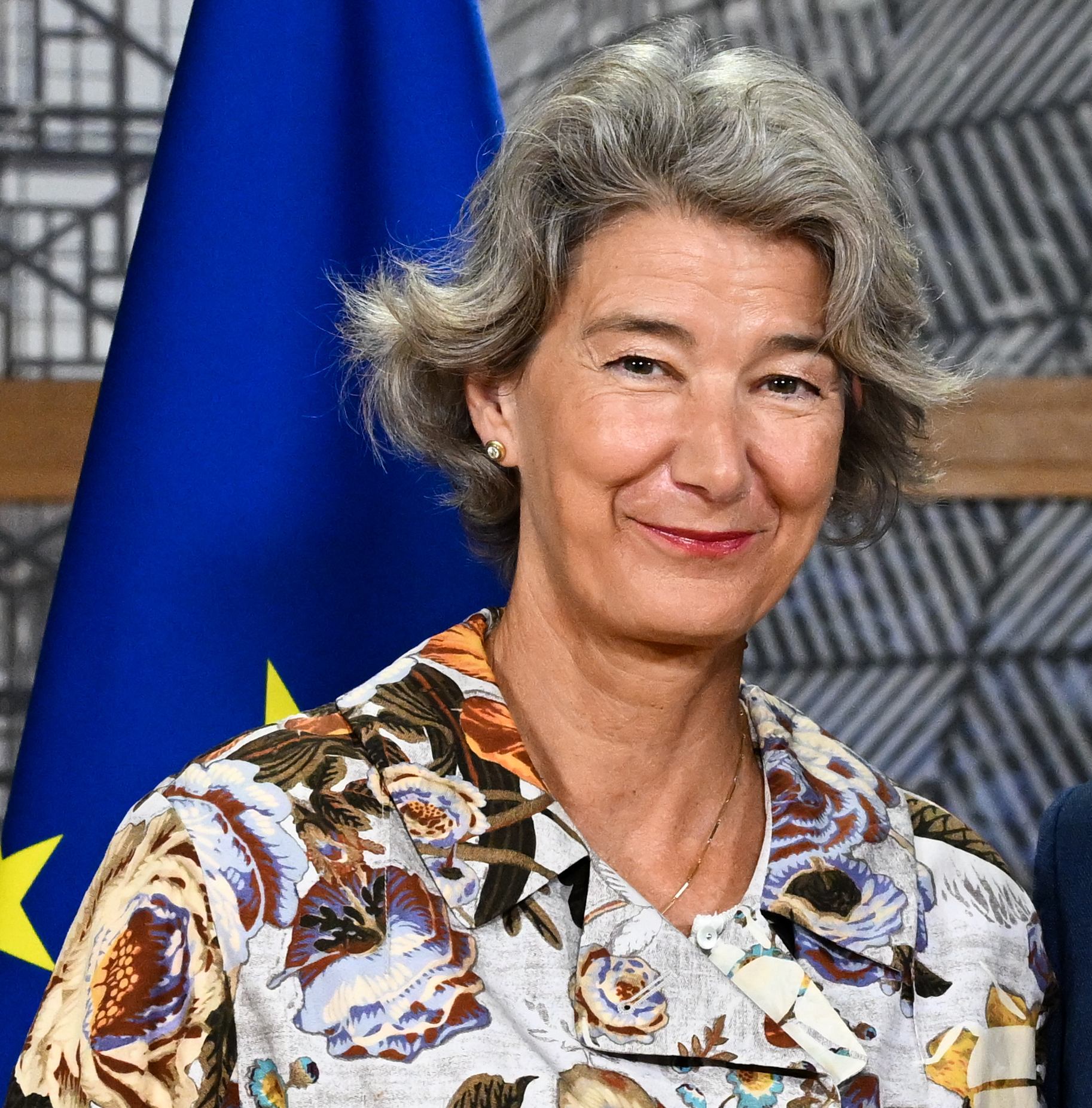
- Patrizia Nanz in 2025
- Born: 9 July 1965 (age 61); Stuttgart, West Germany
- Occupation: President of the European University Institute

Patrizia Nanz (German: [nants]; born 9 July 1965) is a political scientist and an expert in public participation and democratic innovations. She has provided expertise to businesses, state agencies, and governments in various European countries.

She was appointed Vice-President of Germany’s Federal Office for the Safety of Nuclear Waste Management (BASE) on 1 February 2021, where she also led the Collaborative Governance Lab (CO:LAB). She also joined the board of trustees of the Fraunhofer Institute for Systems and Innovation Research (ISI). As of 15 March 2024, she was President of the European University Institute (EUI) in Florence, Italy.

Until 2021, Patrizia Nanz was scientific director of the Institute for Advanced Sustainability Studies (IASS) in Potsdam; professor of transformative sustainability studies at the University of Potsdam; and co-chair of the Science Platform Sustainability 2030, an interdisciplinary platform for research and dialogue to support implementation of the United Nations Sustainable Development Goals in Germany. She is founding director of the Deutsch-Französisches Zukunftswerk (Franco-German Forum for the Future), established under the Aachen Treaty. In January 2019 she was appointed by the German Federal Ministry of Education and Research (BMBF) as a member of the High-Tech Forum, which advised the German government on its High-Tech Strategy 2025 until 2021. Since 2002 she has held a professorship in political theory at the University of Bremen. From 2013 to 2016, Patrizia Nanz was head of the research area "Culture of Participation" at the Institute for Advanced Study in the Humanities (KWI) in Essen. She is the founder of the European Institute for Public Participation (EIPP) and in 2009 was a co-founder of Participedia, a global collaborative wiki platform for democratic innovations. She was a member of the Scientific Committee of the World Forum for Democracy, hosted annually by the Council of Europe.

Her main areas of research are public participation and sustainability transformations (climate change, biotechnology, energy transition, final storage of nuclear waste), democratic theory (transnational governance and the European integration), open government and innovation of administration.

== Education and early career ==
Through a scholarship awarded to gifted individuals by the Bavarian State Ministry of Education, Science and the Arts, Patrizia Nanz studied philosophy at Munich School of Philosophy and history and literary criticism as well as philosophy at universities in Munich, Milan and Frankfurt Rhine-Main between 1984 and 1990. During that time she also trained as a journalist at the IfP Catholic Media School in Munich and undertook internships with various newspapers (including an internship with the Arts & Culture section of the Frankfurter Allgemeinen Zeitung). Her thesis on the philosophy of language was supervised by Jürgen Habermas.

From 1991, Nanz worked for several years as an editor of science and non-fiction publications for German publishing house S. Fischer Verlag and Milan-based publishers Feltrinelli. Following a research term at McGill University, where she attended lectures by Charles Taylor, Nanz commenced her doctoral studies in political science at the European University Institute in Florence in 1997. Her doctoral thesis, on the European public sphere, was published in 2006 (examiners: Philippe C. Schmitter, Jürgen Habermas, Charles Sabel, Peter Wagner).

In 2002, after working as a research associate with the Max Planck Institute for Research on Collective Goods in Bonn, and completing a post-doctoral fellowship at the Centre for the Study of Democracy, University of Westminster (London) researching on the subject of “Democracy, Deliberation and Learning at the Transnational Level: Risk Regulation in the European Union and the World Trade Organisation”, Nanz was appointed to a professorship at the University of Bremen with a focus on political theory. She was a guest researcher at the Massachusetts Institute of Technology (Cambridge, Mass.) in 2003 and a fellow at the Wissenschaftskolleg, Berlin Institute for Advanced Study in 2005–06.

== Research and other activities ==
From 2002 to 2010, Nanz was the coordinator and executive director of the research project “Participation and Legitimation of International Organisations” at the Collaborative Research Center Staatlichkeit im Wandel (Transformations of the State) at the University of Bremen (from 2006 together with Jens Steffek). Between 2005 and 2009, Nanz led the German research project “Giving New Subjects a Voice: Migrants, Organizations and Integration into the Health Care System”. Funded by the Volkswagen Foundation, the project sought to develop innovative approaches that would make the policy process and institutional settings of the health care system more responsive to the needs of migrants.

In 2009, Nanz co-founded Participedia, a global collaborative wiki platform for democratic innovations, and remains a member of the platform’s executive committee. She is a member of the platform’s executive committee. From 2011 to 2013, she contributed to the research project “Participedia: Strengthening an Emerging Global Partnership,” which was supported by the Social Science and Humanities Research Council of Canada. Together with Klaus Töpfer (IASS) and Claus Leggewie (KWI), she co-led the research project DEMOENERGY (Transformation of the Energy System as the Engine for Democratic Innovations). The project studied the development, implementation, and evaluation of dialogue-based processes for citizen participation as solutions for conflict resolution and de-escalation in connection with energy infrastructure projects.

Nanz was previously a member of: the board of trustees of the Hannah Arendt Festival, which is staged annually in Hanover; the Scientific Committee of the World Forum for Democracy (Europarat); the advisory board for Cultural Education and Discourse of the German Goethe Institute; the advisory board of Die Umwelt-Akademie, Munich, as well as a corresponding member of the advisory board of the European Forum Alpbach.

=== Franco-German Forum for the Future ===
To strengthen Franco-German cooperation and promote mutual understanding between the two countries, French President Emmanuel Macron and former German Chancellor Angela Merkel signed the Aachen Treaty in January 2019. Article 22 of the Treaty established the “Deutsch-Französisches Zukunftswerk” (Franco-German Forum for the Future). The forum accompanies and examines initiatives in German and French municipalities that are pursuing comprehensive change. In transnational dialogs, local politicians and administrators learn from each other how they can work together with citizens, local businesses, and associations to develop tailored solutions to future challenges. Patrizia Nanz was the founding Director on the German branch from July 2020 to April 2022. During its 2020/2021 work cycle, the Forum published recommendations on strengthening environmental transformations and promoting economic and social resilience in towns and communities.

=== Coal phase-out in Germany ===
As part of an initiative of the Federal Ministry of Education and Research in Germany, Nanz has also been involved in a project concerning the phase-out of coal in the German region of Lusatia. In their project "Social Transformation and Policy Advice in Lusatia", Nanz and the Institute for Advanced Sustainability Studies (IASS) analyzed the supra-regional opportunities for democratically designed and socially-just structural change in Lusatia and, in this context, developed proposals for structuring regional cooperation processes. The findings of the project are available to political and social actors and are incorporated into the work of the "Zukunftswerkstatt Lausitz," which is accompanied by the IASS research group.

=== Science Platform for Sustainability 2030 ===
Until 2021 Nanz was co-chair of the “Science Platform for Sustainability 2030", an interdisciplinary platform for research and dialogue to support the implementation of the German Sustainable Development Strategy 2021 within the context of the United Nations 2030 Agenda for Sustainable Development and its 17 Sustainable Development Goals (SDGs). The platform supports policymaking for sustainable development by generating, collating, and strategically disseminating knowledge. It provides a scientific perspective on both the progress towards and obstacles to the implementation of the 2030 Agenda in, with, and through Germany.

== Views ==
Along with Claus Leggewie and other social scientists, Nanz is a proponent of democratic innovation based on the participation of a randomly selected sample of citizens (e.g., citizen councils), who are invited to develop and identify possible solutions to future challenges. These bodies are of a consultative/advisory nature, and the adoption of their findings requires the approval of a democratically elected local council or parliament at the state or national level. Nanz also argues that, government needs to become more collaborative to ensure the responsible uptake of citizens’ ideas and suggestions and to prevent participatory frustration. Nanz and Leggewie propose the institutionalization of “future councils” as a means of overcoming the short-termism of politics and of anchoring political responsibility beyond legislative periods. Furthermore, they outline how the totality of consultative bodies (municipal, national, and Europe-wide) could form a fourth power and complement representative parliamentary democracy.

Nanz, together with Charles Taylor and Madeleine Beaubien Taylor, uses local examples to describe how democracies in transformations can be revitalized by involving citizens.

Nanz has also argued that the contemporary crisis of democracy cannot be overcome merely by adopting elements of public participation as a complement to representative democracy. Instead, she believes, priority must be given to efforts to strengthen the credibility of democracy as a form of governance; for instance, by enabling citizens and policymakers to develop and assume responsibility for goals that can only be achieved over the longer term. According to Nanz, the future of the open society depends upon a vigorous defense of democratic rights and values as well as a vivid public sphere, civic values, and solidarity.

As a (partial) solution, Nanz calls for future decision-makers in Europe to be trained in such a way that they can make ethically sustainable decisions that integrate multiple forms of knowledge. Administrative staff would also need practical training in collaboration and innovation skills.

Patrizia Nanz assumes that the innovative power of society is the most important resource for dealing with future issues. Therefore, she proposes to rethink and reconfigure the relationship between politics and administration, civil society, business, and science. On the one hand, through greater vertical interconnectivity of the political–administrative levels and a corresponding bottom-up federalism: learning from pioneers and lighthouse initiatives for setting the political framework at the state and federal levels; and on the other hand, through early involvement of non-state actors, beyond organized interest groups, as an integral part of state action. In addition, for cross-cutting issues, it is necessary to overcome the narrow focus of departmental “silos” through horizontal forms of organization.

== Published works ==
=== Monographies ===
- Reconstructing Democracy. How Citizens Are Building from the Ground Up, (with Charles Taylor and Madeleine Beaubien Taylor) Harvard University Press, 2020.
- Die Konsultative. Mehr Demokratie durch Bürgerbeteiligung, Klaus Wagenbach Verlag, 2016, (with Claus Leggewie); english version: No Representation Without Consultation. A Citizen's Guide to Participatory Democracy(with Claus Leggewie), transl. by Damian Harrison & Stephe Roche, Between The Lines, June 2019.
- Handbuch Bürgerbeteiligung - Verfahren und Akteure, Chancen und Grenzen, Bundeszentrale für politische Bildung, 2012/2015 (with Miriam Fritsche). Italian Version: La partecipazione dei cittadini: un manuale. Metodi partecipativi: protagonisti, opportunita’ e limiti, Regione Emilia Romagna 2014.
- Europolis. Constitutional Patriotism beyond the Nation State, Manchester University Press, 2006; Italian Version: Europolis. Un idea controcorrente di integrazione politica, Giangiacomo Feltrinelli, 2009. With a foreword by Charles Taylor.
- Wahrheit und Politik in der Mediengesellschaft: Anmerkungen zu Hannah Arendt, Klaus Wagenbach Verlag, 2006/2013.

=== Edited volumes ===
- The Routledge Handbook of Democracy and Sustainability, (with Bornemann, B., Knappe, H., & Nanz, P. (Eds.)), Routledge, 2022
- Is Europe listening to us? Successes and Failures of EU Citizen Consultations (edited with Raphael Kies), Ashgate Publishing, 2013. French Version: Les nouvelles voix de l’Europe? Analyses des consultations citoyennes, Editions Larcier/De Boeck, forthcoming, 2013. With a foreword by EU-Commissioner Viviane Reding
- Civil Society Participation in International Governance: A Cure for Its Democratic Deficit? (edited with Jens Steffek and Claudia Kissling), Palgrave Macmillan, 2008.

=== Journal articles and book chapters ===
- “Participation”, in: Oxford Handbook of International Organizations (Ed. by Jacob Katz Cogan, Ian Hurd and Ian Johnstone), Oxford University Press, 2015 (with Klaus Dingwerth)
- "The future council. New forms of democratic participation", in: Eurozine, 2013 (with Claus Leggewie).
- "Lo sviluppo della cittadinanza comunitaria e la corte della giustizia europea", in Paradigmi. Rivista di critica filosofica, special issue 1, 2013.
- "Free Movement and the Emergence of European Social Citizenship", in: Österreichische Zeitschrift für Politikwissenschaft, 4/2012 (with Dawid Friedrich and Kerstin Blome).
- "Global governance, participation, and the public sphere", in: David Held, Mathias König-Archibugi (Ed.), Global Governance and Public Accountability, Government and Opposition, 2004, pp. 314–335 (with Jens Steffek).
- Crisis and Participation in the European Union: Energy Policy as a Test Bed for a New Politics of Citizen Participation. In: Global Society, 31, 2017, p. 65–82 (with J-H. Kamlage).
