= The Politics of Recognition =

1992 essay by Charles Taylor

- Author: Charles Taylor
- Language: English
- Published in: Multiculturalism and "The Politics of Recognition"
- Publication date: 1992

"The Politics of Recognition" is a 1992 essay by the Canadian philosopher Charles Taylor, based on the inaugural lecture he delivered at the University Center for Human Values at Princeton University. The essay discusses political currents that seek recognition for particular identity groups. It was first published as part of the volume Multiculturalism and "The Politics of Recognition", which in 1994 was republished with additional commentaries under the title Multiculturalism: Examining the Politics of Recognition.

== See also ==
- Bouchard–Taylor Commission
- Identity politics
- Multiculturalism
- Recognition justice
