= Beatty Lectures =

Annual lecture at McGill University in Canada

The Beatty Memorial Lecture is a distinguished annual lecture coordinated by McGill University in Montreal, Quebec, Canada. The lecture series was inaugurated in 1952 to honour Edward Wentworth Beatty, the first Canadian-born president of the Canadian Pacific Railway and the former chancellor of McGill, a position he held from 1921 until his death in 1943. Each year, an internationally renowned visitor presents a public lecture on a subject of their choice, providing an opportunity for the McGill community and the general public to "further their education on topical issues."

The motto of the lecture series is, "Change Through Exchange".

Themes covered in past Beatty Lectures have ranged in focus, from politics, philosophy, science, comedy and urbanization, to the environment and literature. Past lecturers have included Nobel Laureates, leading neuroscientists, renowned musicians and trailblazing activists. Some of the most famous lecturers have included Margaret Atwood; Richard Dawkins; Deepak Chopra, Muhammad Yunus, Queen Noor of Jordan, Jane Goodall, Saul Bellow, Arthur Ashe and Douglas Copland.

== Beatty Lecturers ==
- 1954 – Sarvepalli Radhakrishnan, "India and World Affairs"
- 1955 – Barbara Ward, "Interplay of East and West"
- 1956 – Julian Huxley, "The Possibilities of Life, Mind, Man"
- 1959 – Morris Bishop, "The Great River at the White Man's Coming / The Missionary and the Coureur du Bois: Sagard and Brandûlé / Champlain"
- 1961 – Arnold Toynbee, "The Present Day Experiment in Western Civilization: The Experiment in Hellenization / The Attraction of the Western Way of Life / Parliamentary Democracy on Trial"
- 1961 – Douglas Copland, "The Changing Structure of the Western Economy"
- 1963 – A. L. Rowse, "The Political Uses of History / The Role of Germany in Modern History / The Responsibility of the Historian"
- 1964 – Edwin Rich (historian), "Montreal and the Fur Trade – The French Background/The American Frontier/The Northwest Company"
- 1967 – Max Beloff, "Commonwealth Weakness, Britain"
- 1968 – Han Suyin, "Asia Today – Two Outlooks"
- 1971 – Ritchie Calder, "Science and Social Change: Science and International Relations/Science and Human Rights/Science and Posterity"
- 1972 – Robert L. Sinsheimer, "Genetic Engineering – Ambush or Opportunity"
- 1973 – Saul Bellow, "Joyce's Ulysses: A Personal View"
- 1974 – Robert N. Bellah, "Relevance of Man's Religious Experience"
- 1975 – Fred Hoyle, "The Emergence of Intelligence in the Universe/Cosmological Theories and Controversies/The History of Matter"
- 1975 – Yehudi Menuhin, "Interpretation in Music and in Life"
- 1976 – Alexander King (scientist), "A New Economic Order – Is it Necessary or Feasible?"
- 1976 – Derek de Solla Price, "Craftsmanship and Jigsawpuzzling in Science"
- 1977 – Edwin Reischauer, "Japanese-American Relations"
- 1977 – E. O. Wilson, "The Evolution of Social Behaviour"
- 1979 – Jane Goodall, "Chimpanzees in the Wild: Perspectives on Primate Behaviour"
- 1979 – Richard Feynman, "Light and Matter – The Modern View: Photons – Particles of Light / Quantum Behaviour / Interaction of Light and Matter"
- 1979 – Ved Mehta, "Mahatma Gandhi and Modern India"
- 1981 – Ralf Dahrendorf, "A Swing to the Right? Socio-political Changes in the Western World / The European Community at the Beginning of the 1980s"
- 1981 – Saunders Mac Lane, "How Mathematicians Get New Ideas / Distortion of Science by Politics"
- 1982 – Gwendolen M. Carter, "Apartheid: Dying or Resurgent / The African States Seek Economic Liberation"
- 1983 – I. F. Stone, "The Trial of Socrates Revisited: What Plato Doesn't Tell Us: The Case for the Prosecution / How Easily Socrates Might Have Won Acquittal / Plato on Trial: The Hidden Horrors of a Perfect City"
- 1984 – Lord William McCarthy, "The Limits of Trade Union Power"
- 1985 – Francis Crick, "How Do We See Things? / The Search-Light Hypothesis/The Problem of Awareness"
- 1987 – John Mortimer, "The Art of Advocacy / Clinging to the Wreckage"
- 1987 – Christopher Hill, "Milton and the English Revolution / Bunyan and His World / The End of the World"
- 1988 – Kirk Varnedoe, "Fine Disregard: Inventions in Early Modern Art – New Space: Near and Far / New Time: Fragmentation and Repetition / Overview: The Flight of the Mind"
- 1989 – Sally Falk Moore, "Nationalism, Cultural Pluralism and the State"
- 1990 – Gerald Edelman, "Morphology and Mind: Topobiology: The Problem of Morphology / Neural Darwinism: The Problem of Perception / The Remembered Present: Problems of Consciousness"
- 1990 – Norman Myers, "Safeguarding the Biosphere: What Cost? What Payoff?"
- 1990 – Francis Bretherton, "Understanding the Earth System"
- 1990 – Daniel Boorstin, "America: Discovery, Invention or Creation?"
- 1991 – C. N. Yang, "Symmetry and Physics"
- 1991 – Pierre Boulez, "Répons / How to Develop a Musical Idea"
- 1992 – Arthur Ashe, "Living with AIDS"
- 1993 – Jacques Attali, "Europe on the World Stage in the Twenty-First Century"
- 1993 – Mikhail Gorbachev, "The New World Order"
- 1993 – Witold Lutoslawski, "About the Element of Chance in Music"
- 1993 – Barbara Ehrenreich, "Can Feminism Change the World?"
- 1994 – Margaret Drabble, "The Corpse in the Garden: Concealments and Disclosures in Fiction and Biography"
- 1994 – Rudolph Marcus, "Life in Science: Interaction of Theory and Experiments"
- 1994 – David Akers-Jones, "Hong Kong Horizons"
- 1994 – Nancy Wexler, "Huntington's Disease: Member of an Expanding Family of Disorders"
- 1994 – Paul Sacher, "Paul Sacher Remembers Béla Bartók"
- 1995 – Catherine Bertini, "Women Eat Last"
- 1995 – Yves Coppens, "From Africa, the Cradle, to America, the New World: The Prehistory of Man and the Peopling of the Earth"
- 1996 – Roger Schank, "Why most schooling is irrelevant: Computers and the future of learning"
- 1996 – Bernard Kouchner, "Conflict Prevention in an Age of Global Anxiety"
- 1997 – John Horgan, "The End of Science"
- 1997 – Oliver Sacks, "Neurology and the Soul"
- 1997 – Dame Cicely Saunders, "Lessons in Living from the Dying"
- 1998 – Luc Montagnier, "AIDS on the Threshold of the Year 2000: Merging Western Experiences and African Realities"
- 1999 – Carl Djerassi, "Science-in-fiction is not science fiction"
- 1999 – Eugenie C. Scott, "The Great Controversy"
- 1999 – Paul Ewald, "What's Catching: The Darwinism of Disease"
- 1999 – Steven Mithen, "Becoming Human: The Evolution of Mind and Language"
- 2000 – Paul Crutzen, "The Importance of the Tropics in Atmospheric Chemistry"
- 2000 – Jonathan Miller, "Laughing Matters: Humour and Comedy"
- 2000 – Vartan Gregorian, "Libraries and Reading in the Computer Age"
- 2002 – Wangari Maathai, "Standing up for the Environment"
- 2002 – John Maddox, "What remains to be discovered"
- 2002 – Queen Noor of Jordan, "Creating a Culture of Peace"
- 2002 – William Galston, "Religion and Liberal Society"
- 2002 – Richard John Neuhaus, "Liberal Democracy and Acts of Faith"
- 2002 – Sandra Steingraber, "Protecting the First Environment: The Ecology of Pregnancy and Childbirth"
- 2003 – Herman E. Daly, "Uneconomic Growth and The Illth of Nations: Defining the Optimal Scale of the Macro Economy"
- 2004 – Shirin Ebadi, "Democracy: The Precondition to Peace"
- 2004 – Steven Sanderson, "Global Poverty Alleviation and the Impoverishment of Wild Nature"
- 2005 – Michael Ignatieff, "Canada in the World: The Challenges Ahead"
- 2006 – Deepak Chopra, "Religion and Spirituality"
- 2006 – Richard Dawkins, "Queerer than We Suppose: The Strangeness of Science"
- 2007 – Anna Tibaijuka, "Divided Cities: Caught between hope and despair"
- 2008 – James Gustave Speth, "Capitalism and the Environment – from Crisis to Sustainability"
- 2009 – Marc Tessier-Lavigne, "Brain Development and Brain Repair: The life and death of nerve cells"
- 2010 – Muhammad Yunus, "Building Social business – The New Kind of Capitalism that Serves Humanity's Most Pressing Needs"
- 2011 – Alfred Brendel, "Does Classical Music Have to be Entirely Serious?"
- 2012 – Kerry Courneya, "Physical Activity in Cancer Survivors: A Field in Motion"
- 2013 – Witold Rybczynski, "Architecture and the Passage of History"
- 2014 – Karl Deisseroth, "Illuminating the Brain"
- 2015 – John Wood, "Whose Version of the Future is Going to Win?"
- 2016 – Margaret Atwood, "Humanities in an Age of Environmental Crisis"
- 2017 – Charles Taylor,"The Challenge of Regressive Democracy"
- 2018 – Roxane Gay, "Difficult Women, Bad Feminists and Unruly Bodies"
- 2019 – Jane Goodall, "Journey from the Jungle"
- 2020 – Steven Pinker, "Progress and Enlightenment in the 21st Century"
- 2021 – Anthony Fauci, "COVID-19: Lessons Learned and Remaining Challenges"
- 2022 – Maria Ressa, "The Battle for Facts: Critical for a Sustainable Future"
- 2023 – Alanis Obomsawin

== Notes ==
An anthology featuring 15 past Beatty Lectures titled With the World to Choose From: Celebrating Seven Decades of the Beatty Lecture at McGill University was published by McGill-Queen's University Press in 2021, including lectures by Barbara Ward, Robert Sinsheimer, Mikhail Gorbachev, Muhammad Yunus, Charles Taylor, and Roxane Gay.
