= James Lewis Heft =

American theologian

James Lewis Heft is an American theologian currently the Alton M. Brooks Professor of Religion at University of Southern California.
