= Mark G. Lawrence =

American atmospheric scientist

- Born: 5 February 1969 (age 57); New Jersey, United States
- Citizenship: American
- Education: Georgia Institute of Technology
- Scientific career
- Fields: Atmospheric Sciences, Sustainability
- Workplaces: Institute for Advanced Sustainability Studies; University of Potsdam; Max Planck Institute for Chemistry
- Website: https://www.iass-potsdam.de/en/people/mark-lawrence

Mark G. Lawrence (born 5 February 1969) is an American atmospheric scientist whose research focuses on a range of sustainable development topics at the science policy and science-society interface. He is scientific director at the Research Institute for Sustainability (RIFS) in Potsdam (former Institute for Advanced Sustainability Studies (IASS) in Potsdam.

== Education and academic career ==
Mark Lawrence received his Ph.D. in Earth and Atmospheric Sciences in 1996 from the Georgia Institute of Technology, Atlanta, USA, after which he moved to Germany to work as a postdoctoral researcher at the Max Planck Institute for Chemistry (MPIC) in Mainz, working closely with Paul J. Crutzen. From 2000, he was a research group leader at MPIC and went on to lead the working group Atmospheric Modeling at MPIC. In the same year he completed his habilitation in physics at the University of Mainz. In 2009 and 2010 he served as an interim professor of meteorology at the University of Mainz and received the State Teaching Award of Rhineland-Palatinate. On October 15, 2011, Lawrence was appointed to be a scientific director at the IASS Potsdam. In 2023, he is appointed as a member of German Council for Sustainable Development by the chancellor of Germany.

== Research ==
As an atmospheric scientist, Lawrence works particularly on topics within the field of air quality and climate change. At the IASS he helped the organization partner with the Nepal Academy of Science and Technology to fight Climate Change. At the IASS he was coordinator of the EU project 'European Transdisciplinary Analysis of Climate Engineering (EuTRACE)', in which 14 partner organizations investigated the potentials and risks of climate geoengineering (2012–2015).

== Professional service ==
- Member of the International Advisory Board for "REACH: Resilience to Environmental Change and Emerging Health Threats" (since 2021)
- Deputy Chairman of the German Climate Consortium (DKK) (since 2021)
- Chairman of the advisory board for the Climate Engineering Conferences 2014, 2017, and 2020 (CEC14, CEC17, CEC20), (since 2013)
- Journal One Earth, Advisory Board (since 2019)
- Journal Advanced Sustainable Systems, Executive Advisory Board (since 2016)
- Forum for Climate Engineering Assessment - Advisory Board (since 2016)
- Journal Climanosco, Editorial board and founding member (since 2015)
- Geoengineering Model Intercomparison Project GeoMIP, Steering Committee (since 2014)

== Selected publications ==
- Lawrence, M.G., Schäfer, S. (2019): Promises and perils of the Paris Agreement. Science Vol. 364, Issue 6443, pp. 829–830. DOI: 10.1126/science.aaw4602
- Lawrence, M. G., S. Schäfer, H. Muri, V. Scott, A. Oschlies, N. E. Vaughan, O. Boucher, H. Schmidt, J. Haywood and J. Scheffran (2018): Evaluating climate geoengineering proposals in the context of the Paris Agreement temperature goals. Nature Communications, 9, 3734, doi:10.1038/s41467-018-05938-3
- Lawrence, M. G., and P. J. Crutzen, Was breaking the taboo on research on climate engineering via albedo modification a moral hazard, or a moral imperative?, Earth's Future, 5, 136–143, doi:10.1002/2016EF000463, 2017.
- S. Schäfer; Lawrence, M.G., and 34 further co-authors (2015): The European Transdisciplinary Assessment of Climate Engineering (EuTRACE)
- Irvine, P. J., Kravitz, B., Lawrence, M. G., Muri, H. (2016 online): An overview of the Earth system science of solar geoengineering. - Wiley Interdisciplinary Reviews - Climate Change.
- Reichwein, D., Hubert, A.-M., Irvine, P. J., Benduhn, F., Lawrence, M. G. (2015): State Responsibility for Environmental Harm from Climate Engineering. - Climate Law, 5, 2–4, p. 142–181.
- Schäfer, S., A. Maas, H. Stelzer, and M. G. Lawrence, Earth's Future in the Anthropocene: Technological Interventions between Piecemeal and Utopian Engineering, Earth's Future, Volume 2, Issue 4, Pages 239–243, 2014.
- Schmale, J., D. Shindell, E. v. Schneidemesser, I. Chabay, and M. G. Lawrence, Air pollution: Clean up our skies, Nature, 515, 335–337, 2014.
- Butler, T., B. Lode, A. Parker, K. Mar, F. Schmidt, M. G. Lawrence, Decarbonisation, carbon neutrality, and climate neutrality, 2015
- Lawrence, M. G., and J. Lelieveld, Atmospheric pollutant outflow from southern Asia: A review, Atmospheric Chemistry and Physics, 10, 11017–11096, doi:10.5194/acp-10-11017-2010, 2010.
- Rayfuse, R., M. G. Lawrence and K. M. Gjerde, Ocean Fertilisation and Climate Change: The need to regulate emerging high seas uses, Int. The International Journal of Marine and Coastal Law, 23, 297–326, 2008.
- Lawrence, M. G., P. J. Rasch, R. von Kuhlmann, J. Williams, H. Fischer, M. de Reus, J. Lelieveld, P. J. Crutzen, M. Schultz, P. Stier, H. Huntrieser, J. Heland, A. Stohl, C. Forster, H. Elbern, H. Jakobs, and R. R. Dickerson, Global chemical weather forecasts for field campaign planning: predictions and observations of large-scale features during MINOS, CONTRACE, and INDOEX, Atmospheric Chemistry and Physics, 3, 267–289, 2003.
