= James Mallory (jurist) =

Canadian academic and constitutional expert

James Mallory FRSC
- Born: James Russell Mallory; February 5, 1916; Saint Andrews, New Brunswick, Canada
- Died: June 23, 2003 (aged 87); Ottawa, Ontario, Canada
- Known for: Academic and constitutional expert

James Russell Mallory FRSC (February 5, 1916 – June 26, 2003) was a Canadian academic and constitutional expert.

== Career ==
His radio interview after the 1957 federal election, influenced Prime Minister Louis St. Laurent to allow John Diefenbaker to become the next prime minister. He was also consulted by Governor-general Ed Schreyer after the minority Progressive Conservative government led by Prime Minister Joe Clark was defeated on a motion of no confidence in the Commons.

Born in St. Andrews, New Brunswick, he received a Bachelor of Arts degree in 1937 from the University of New Brunswick, a Bachelor of Law degree from the University of Edinburgh in 1940, and a Master of Arts degree in 1941 from Dalhousie University. From 1941 to 1943, he was an instructor in political science at the University of Saskatchewan. From 1943 to 1944, he was a lecturer in political economy at the University of Toronto. From 1944 to 1946, he was an assistant professor of political economy at Brandon College. He joined McGill University in 1946 as an assistant professor and would remain there until retiring in 1977. He was appointed an associate professor in 1948 and a professor of political science in 1959. From 1953 to 1954, he was a Nuffield Foundation Traveling Fellow.

He was the author of Social Credit and the Federal Power in Canada (1954, University of Toronto Press, ISBN 0-8020-2254-5) and The Structure of Canadian Government (ISBN 0771556004).

In 1964, he was made a Fellow of the Royal Society of Canada. He was awarded the Queen Elizabeth II Silver Jubilee Medal in 1977. He received honorary degrees from University of New Brunswick, Queen's University, the University of Western Ontario, and Bishop's University. The McGill University James R. Mallory Lecture in Canadian Studies is named in his honour.

== Personal life ==
He married Frances Keller in 1940. They had two sons: James and Charles.

== Death ==
He died in Ottawa in 2003.
