= Sources of the Self =

1989 work by Charles Taylor

Sources of the Self: The Making of the Modern Identity
- Author: Charles Taylor
- Language: English
- Subject: Identity
- Publisher: Harvard University Press
- Publication date: 1989
- Publication place: United States
- Pages: 624
- ISBN: 978-0-674-82426-3

Sources of the Self: The Making of the Modern Identity is a work of philosophy by Charles Taylor, published in 1989 by Harvard University Press. It is an attempt to articulate and to write a history of the "modern identity".

== Summary ==
The book "is an attempt to articulate and write a history of the modern identity ... what it is to be a human agent: the senses of inwardness, freedom, individuality, and being embedded in nature which are at home in the modern West."

== Part I: Identity and the Good ==
Before considering the sources of the modern identity, Taylor illuminates the inescapable and yet often unarticulated, or unseen, moral frameworks within which contemporary moral values exist. Taylor articulates these moral frameworks in terms of three axes. The first axis refers to beliefs about the value of human life, how people should be treated, the respect we afford to human life and the moral obligations these beliefs demand from us. The second moral axis refers to beliefs about the kind of life that is worth living, beliefs that permeate our choices and actions in our day to day existence. The third axis refers to the dignity we afford to ourselves and others based on how we understand our role and perhaps usefulness in society.

Taylor illuminates and emphasizes the moral framework for our values because he feels it is invisible to many in contemporary society. Those, for example, who ascribe either explicitly or unreflectively to a utilitarian moral outlook, rationally calculate the greatest good for the greatest number. Many followers of Immanuel Kant also depend on a rational formula for moral action. In Kantian terms this is calculated in terms of reasoning towards moral maxims that would be universally acceptable. Utilitarians and Kantians, however, neglect to enquire why particular goods constitute the greatest good. Why, Taylor asks, would the greatest good be articulated in terms of benevolence as opposed to hedonism? What are the motives that lead a society, and individuals within that society, to rationally calculate a benevolent formula for mutual existence? Utilitarians and followers of Kant provide an answer to these questions in terms of how we calculate the outcome of our acts and (for Kantians) the motives behind our actions. Taylor describes such moral frameworks as procedural; a framework that emphasizes the process by which we come to act and does not articulate the substantive qualitative distinctions about what constitutes a moral good and how differing goods can be of differing value.

Taylor argues that qualitative distinctions about the constitution and value of moral goods are intrinsic to human existence. He positions his thesis in contrast to the naturalist understanding of human life, and first considers a reductive naturalism that holds that all human activity, and hence all human values, can be reduced to laws of nature—laws of nature that preclude qualitative distinctions among moral goods. In response to reductive naturalism, Taylor first notes the ad hominem argument that those who espouse some form of reductive naturalism nonetheless make, and cannot avoid but to make, qualitative distinctions as to the goods by which they live their lives. At the same time, Taylor recognizes that the moral frameworks of past generations, frameworks such as those that understood man as God's creature, have become fractured and that countless other moral frameworks have emerged. The reductive naturalist may object that these frameworks are simply interpretations or re-interpretations of contemporary understandings of the natural world and man's place in it. Moreover, all such moral frameworks are no more than passing modes of interpretation that have no true bearing on man's existence.

Taylor responds to this objection by discussing identity. It is not simply an ad hominem argument that the reductive naturalist cannot avoid making qualitative distinctions among moral goods. Rather, the qualitative distinctions that the reductive naturalist, or anyone else, makes are constitutive of that person's identity; an identity that involves one's understandings of self as a person within a particular family, religion, profession, nation and so on. Taylor argues that the qualitative distinctions we make are intrinsic to the way we conduct our lives, they constitute an orientation towards the world. To provide the best account of human life, the identity that orients each of us towards particular kinds of activity and social understandings must be accounted for. Such an orientation is irreducible to any set of laws of nature that does not account for the qualitative distinctions in moral goods that a particular individual or particular cultural community adhere to; distinctions that in differing cultural communities at differing times place differing values upon differing social intuitions.

Taylor recognizes another, more sophisticated, form of naturalism that he referred to as projectionist naturalism. The projectionist recognizes the irreducibility of human identity to laws of nature. People orient to the world within moral frameworks that guide their action. However, the projectionist will argue, such orientations are a subjective tint upon a value-neutral universe. The projectionist claim is often highlighted at the cusp of two cultures where one moral claim, say, putting a woman in purdah to protect modesty conflicts with another such as a woman's right to self-determination. In such a case, a moral axis (the dignity of persons) can be understood within very different frameworks. And yet, the projectionist will argue, there is no resolution to the conflict, because there are no universal criteria for resolving the subjective beliefs of different cultural communities. There are no universal criteria because qualitative distinctions of goods cannot be measured against a value-neutral universe. Taylor thinks the projectionist thesis is more coherent than the reductionist thesis. However, he followed the philosopher Ludwig Wittgenstein by noting that humans occupy a form of life. Within a form of life there are projectable properties that are intrinsic to that form of life. Just as colours such as "red" or shapes such as "square" pick out properties of the world we react to and engage with, so virtue terms such as "courage" or "generosity" pick out essential properties of our form of life. Our best account of the human form of life must determine the properties and entities that are "real, objective or part of the furniture of things". Of course, understanding moral values as intrinsic to the human form of life does not bestow a singular, correct valuation to a particular cultural community or attribute a particular moral framework with universal-truth status. However, in a universe where humans exist, there is a human form of life. Our moral frameworks exist, no matter how fleetingly or diversely.

The best account of human life, Taylor argues, must account for the moral sources that orient our lives. Such an account should explain the strong evaluations we make about particular modes of life and seek to identify the constitutive good upon which such strong evaluations about qualitative distinctions in moral value are made. By constitutive good, Taylor refers to a good "the love of which empowers us to do and be good." The constitutive good—whether it be a belief in reason over desire, the inherent benevolence of the natural world, or the intuitively benign nature of human sentiment—orients us towards the evaluations that we make and the goods we aspire towards.

Having established that moral sources and the moral frameworks within which they are understood are central to an account of human existence, Taylor focuses on an investigation of modern identities in Western civilization and the moral sources from which these identities are constituted. Taylor emphasizes that his investigation is not a historical investigation. Such an investigation would demand a breadth of scope involving social, economic, political, structural, and philosophical change (to name but a few aspects) that would not be possible within his work. Moreover, he noted, such a historical investigation might presuppose an idealist form of history in which history is shaped by the evolving ideas and ideologies of different times. Rather, Taylor asks what the conditions were within which the sources of the modern identity arose. These conditions involved the changing cultural, economic, political, religious, social, and scientific practices of society. Taylor focuses on the works of philosophers and artists to identify the moral sources, not because they created or determined the moral sources of a given time (although many artists and philosophers may have had some influence), but rather because they were best able to articulate assumptions, beliefs, and theories that constituted the moral sources of a given time and place. The following is a brief outline of some of the moral sources that Taylor discussed.

== Part II: Inwardness ==
In Homeric times, a central constitutive good was the warrior ethic. A man evaluated the goods available to him in terms of the glory they would bring him in battle and the heroic deeds he would be able to recount. In classical Greece, Taylor notes a shift towards a tempering of the warrior ethic. Plato understood a vaguely apprehendable, yet unchanging, cosmic order within which man existed. Reason, or logos, was a vision of the meaningful cosmic order and this vision was the constitutive good that was the source of moral evaluations. The human soul, which in Homeric times had been seen as the temporal life force of an individual, became an immortal tripartite soul constituted by spirit, desire and reason. Spirit, which, according to Taylor encapsulated the warrior ethic, was subordinated to reason. And reason was understood, not as inward calculation or cognition, but as a vision of cosmic order. Aristotle differed from Plato in that he did not see all order as unchanging and cosmic. According to Aristotle, the order within which people interacted and conducted their lives as social beings could not be understood simply within an unchanging cosmic order. Rather, people engaged in society through the use of a practical wisdom that discerned the goods an individual should strive towards. The constitutive good for Aristotle, the good that underpinned all life goods, was the flourishing happiness (eudaimonia) of both the individual, and of the society. Despite the differences between Plato and Aristotle, both philosophers saw wisdom and reasoning as a vision of meaningful order whether it be cosmically or socially constituted.

Taylor argues that an important influence on the modern identity, an influence that eventually eclipsed the Greek vision of reason, was the fourth-century monk and philosopher Augustine of Hippo. Augustine had encountered the philosophy of Plato and was deeply influenced by Plato's ideas. From Plato, Augustine acquired the idea of an intelligible eternal cosmic order; an order that Augustine attributed to God. Following Plato, Augustine also argued for a temporal, sensible existence of material objects. For Augustine, the material world was sensible to us through our senses and our contact with the physical world. The intelligible and spiritual world of God, however, was only made manifest when we attune to the light within us, the light of our God given soul. Taylor notes that the key contrast with the classical Greeks here was that reason and intelligibility were becoming distinct from a vision of meaningful order and reason within the world. Augustinian Christianity altered the orientation within which identity was formed. Rather than understanding the goods of life in terms of a vision of order in the world, Augustine had brought the focus to the light within, an immaterial, yet intelligible soul that was either condemned or saved.

Augustine's theories, which were central doctrines throughout Christian civilization for a millennium, were, nonetheless, far removed from the more radical inwardness of enlightenment philosophers such as René Descartes and John Locke. In Descartes' philosophy, the vision of a God given meaningful order involving a spiritual essence or expressive dimension within the world was altogether absent. God, moral value and virtue could not be found within the meaningful order of the world. For Descartes, the world and the human body were mechanisms. The mind was immaterial and rational. Understanding the world, our place in the world and the power of God depended on a rational objectification of the material world and a reflexive mental turn in which an individual came to see the mind as a mental, immaterial object that was autonomous from the material mechanistic world. For Descartes, the mind was free from material control and the mind was capable of rational, instrumental control of the material world. Mind was no longer an integral part of worldly activity. Rather, mind had disengaged from the world.

Following Descartes, Taylor notes, Locke's understanding of the mind also involved a radical disengagement from the world. However, unlike Descartes, whose understanding of the mental depended on an inward reasoning that was autonomous from the surrounding world, Locke rejected the possibility of innate ideas. For Locke, understanding the world and mankind’s place in the world depended on the sense impressions that our senses provided. Experience of the world was constituted by simple ideas given by sensual impressions. Reflection combined these ideas into more complex ideas. Understanding of the world was no more than the combination of sense impressions. The mind itself had become a mechanism that constructed and organized understandings through the building blocks of simple ideas. Whereas Plato saw reasoning as inherent in a vision of a meaningful world, Locke saw reasoning as a mechanistic procedure that was able to make sense not only of the surrounding world but also of the mind itself. Taylor refers to the radical reflexivity that allows the mind to objectify itself as a "punctual self". The person can now look at his own reasoning, will and desires as though these were extrinsic and, according to Locke, manipulable objects. The self that looks upon his own mind is extensionless, "it is nowhere but in this power to fix things as objects."

== Part III: The Affirmation of Ordinary Life ==
Taylor argues that as the Scientific Revolution exemplified in the work of Nicolaus Copernicus and Sir Isaac Newton took hold in Western civilization, a shift occurred in the hierarchical evaluations placed on many life goods. The warrior ethic had remained in the valuation placed on many life goods and still remains today. Following Aristotle and Plato, being a warrior, aristocrat, or active citizen involved engaging in activities of governance, scholarship, or military prowess that were of higher value than the common day-to-day activities of production. The Protestant movement in religion, however, eschewed the hierarchical governance of religious life. Moreover, there had been a philosophical shift towards an empirical approach to human understanding that had emerged with the scientific revolution and had been articulated by Locke (and Francis Bacon before him). The logical proofs for understanding required by medieval scholars had been displaced by requirements for practical demonstration that valued the work of craftsmen such as watchmakers and lens-grinders. Along with these changes in religious and philosophical practice, there arose an affirmation of ordinary life. The daily life of family and production, along with the value of being a father, a carpenter, or a farmer, was held as a moral good.

The transposition of values towards an affirmation of ordinary life emerged within a changing understanding of the cosmic order. The eighteenth-century mechanistic understanding of universe and the human mind did not give rise to an atheist understanding of the cosmos. Rather, the mechanisms discovered through practical, empirical investigation were understood as God's work. A belief in deism emerged, though never uncontested—namely, that miracles and revelation were not required as a proof of God's existence. Rather, the natural order itself was sufficient proof. Mankind lived within a God-given order, and life was determined by that order.

Taylor argues that within a deist order, the road to salvation was no longer determined simply by a person's position in the world and his or her actions, but also the manner in which one lives one's life—"worshipfully" according to Protestants or "rationally" according to Locke. Within a deist order, the question arose as to how one chooses the manner in which to lead one's life and why one would value a rational or worshipful manner of living. The answer could no longer be through revelation, nor was it manifest in a mechanistic world. Again the answer was found within the mind, but it could not be found in a capacity to reason, for such an answer would be circular; that is, through reasoning we come to love reason. Rather, as articulated by the philosopher Francis Hutcheson and shortly thereafter by David Hume, our moral evaluations of the good depend on our moral sentiments. There was a natural, and—in the Deist tradition—God-given, inclination towards the good.

== Part IV: The Voice of Nature ==
Taylor outlines two responses to Lockean deism and the question of moral sources that followed from it. On the one hand, Kant sought to parse moral evaluation from nature by arguing that moral choice and evaluations depended solely on the application of reason. On the other hand, the philosopher Jean-Jacques Rousseau followed the moral sentiment thesis of Hume. Rousseau contrasted the inherent good of nature within mankind to the corrupting influence of society without. Moreover, the application of reason could lead a person away from the good towards the corrupt values of society. Contrary to the belief in original sin that had been prevalent since the time of Augustine, Rousseau saw the natural order as good and the natural sentiments of mankind as embedded within the benign natural order. The self was mysterious and hard to fathom. Only in conscience, the natural sentiments within us, could we apprehend the voice of nature. Within the radical reflexivity of Descartes and Locke, there had been a vision of a rational, calculable, and manipulable self. Rousseau, however, articulated a view in which the natural inclinations of the self were hidden deep within, barely apprehendable, and corrupted by the beliefs and reason of society.

Following Rousseau, to understand the self was not simply to describe what was evident in a reflexive analysis of the mind, but a task of discovering and bringing to light what was hidden within. Art became a process of expressing—of making manifest—our hidden nature and, by so doing, creating and completing the discovery within the artistic expression. This expressivist turn was a turn away from the natural order of Lockean deism. Whereas Locke had seen the cosmos in terms of interlocking purposes that could be grasped by disengaged reason, the expressivism that followed Rousseau saw a natural, yet not exoterically available, source of life that could be shaped and given a real form through human expression.

== Part V: Subtler Languages ==
Following the expressivist turn, Taylor notes, "The moral or spiritual order of things must come to us indexed to a personal vision" (p. 428). Moral evaluations have become mediated by the imagination. The scientific ethos and the naturalist's recognition that moral understandings are created subjectively—a subjectivity that was entirely absent from the logos of Plato and Aristotle—does not allow us to abandon the radical reflexivity; a reflexivity that has become deeply entrenched within the self-understandings of those raised within the Western tradition. Personal experience, the resonance of experience on our feelings and the creation of understanding through expression have become integral aspects of the modern identity.

Taylor broadly divides the sources for contemporary Western qualitative evaluations of moral value into three broad strands; (1) the theistic grounding as articulated by Augustine; (2) the naturalism of disengaged reason that is typically associated with the scientific outlook; and (3) the romantic expressivism articulated by Rousseau. The moral frameworks within which we make strong evaluations as to the value of life goods appear irredeemably fractured along these three strands. And yet, the procedural neo-Kantian and utilitarian moral frameworks adopted so readily by Western societies still maintain a general consensus around key goods—such as human rights and dignity of life—along all three of the moral axes discussed earlier. Possibly, Taylor argued, this largely unquestioned consensus originates in the shared moral sources for all three sources of our moral evaluations; sources that can be found in the theistic and deist history of Western civilization.

== Conclusion: The Conflicts of Modernity ==
There is broad agreement in modern culture about moral standards: "the demand for universal justice and beneficence ... the claims of equality ... freedom and self-rule ... and ... the avoidance of death and suffering." But there is disagreement about moral sources that support the agreement. Taylor explains how these sources are threefold: theism, "a naturalism of disengaged reason", extending to scientism, and Romanticism or its modernist successors.

Beyond the disagreement on moral sources is the conflict between disengaged reason and Romanticism/modernism, that instrumental reason empties life of meaning. Then there is disagreement between the Romantics and the modernists on morality, whether an aesthetic life could be spontaneously moral, or whether "the highest spiritual ideals threaten to lay the most crushing burdens on mankind."

Taylor criticizes the critics as too narrow, and too blind. Rationalist critics of Romanticism often forget how much they "seek 'fulfillment' and 'expression.'" Opponents of technology often forget how it was disengaged reason that proposed freedom, individual rights, and the affirmation of ordinary life. Radical opponents and repudiators of modern life appeal to a "universal freedom from domination."

Against all this blindness and "partisan narrowness" Taylor sees hope "implicit in Judaeo-Christian theism ... and ... its central promise of a divine affirmation of the human".

== See also ==
- Identity (social science)
