= Round About a Pound a Week =

1913 survey of poverty and infant mortality in London

Round About a Pound a Week was an influential 1913 survey of poverty and infant mortality in London, by feminist and socialist Maud Pember Reeves, co-authored by anarchist activist Charlotte Wilson. The project was conceived and carried out under the auspices of the Fabian Society's Women's Group, which she co-founded in 1908. The report was originally published as a political pamphlet or tract, arguing for specific reforms, but is still in print and considered relevant today.

== Overview ==
A Royal Commission was gathering evidence on the Poor Laws; Beatrice Webb was a commissioner, and contributed to the Minority Report, but she could see that most of the commission had a different vision to implement. Webb was also a member of the Fabian Society, a precursor to the Labour Party, as was Pember Reeves. They wanted to understand and alleviate poverty, so they focussed their attention on a few dozen families in Lambeth, a poor borough in South London and still one of the poorest parts of Britain, and recorded their attempt at social reform over the four years just before the Great War, i.e. 1909–1913. The families they selected were not the poorest; they were the "respectable poor" of the working class, with the menfolk in relatively stable employment, earning "about a pound a week"; nonetheless, one in five of the children died at birth, and another one in ten before they reached adulthood. The project targeted pregnant women, and offered them money for extra food from a few months before the birth until several months afterwards. The families kept detailed budgets of their income and expenditure.

The book contains details of the division of food within the family, with the breadwinner being given a much greater share of the food than the rest of the family. This was because the other family members were completely dependent on the breadwinner. Nonetheless, this was rarely a sufficient amount. The conditions in the book have been described as "appalling", demonstrating the daily struggle these women faced to feed their families without being "forced to pawn their own boots".

It has also been noted that Reeves avoided the "sense of moral superiority" common in outside observers of these people, seeing them as "independent, resourceful, hard-working, respectable, but poor".

The Fabian pamphlet argued for government reforms, including child benefit, school dinners, and free health clinics. It also noted the role of poor housing conditions in child mortality, and how prenatal nutrition could help.

== Selected editions ==
- Reeves, M.S., Round About a Pound a Week. Introduction by Sally Alexander. London: Virago Press.
- Reeves, M.S., Round About a Pound a Week. New York: Garland Pub., 1980. ISBN 0-8240-0119-2
- Reeves, M.S., Round About a Pound a Week. Preface by Polly Toynbee. London: Persephone Books ISBN 9781903155691.

== See also ==
- Nutrition and pregnancy
- History of London 1900–1939
