= Majority report =

Majority report may refer to:

- A Majority opinion, in judicial decisions which are not unanimous
- Majority Report (Poor Law)
- Majority Report, American feminist newspaper
- The Majority Report with Sam Seder, a US radio show, hosted by Sam Seder, formerly hosted by Janeane Garofalo

== See also ==
- Minority Report (disambiguation)
