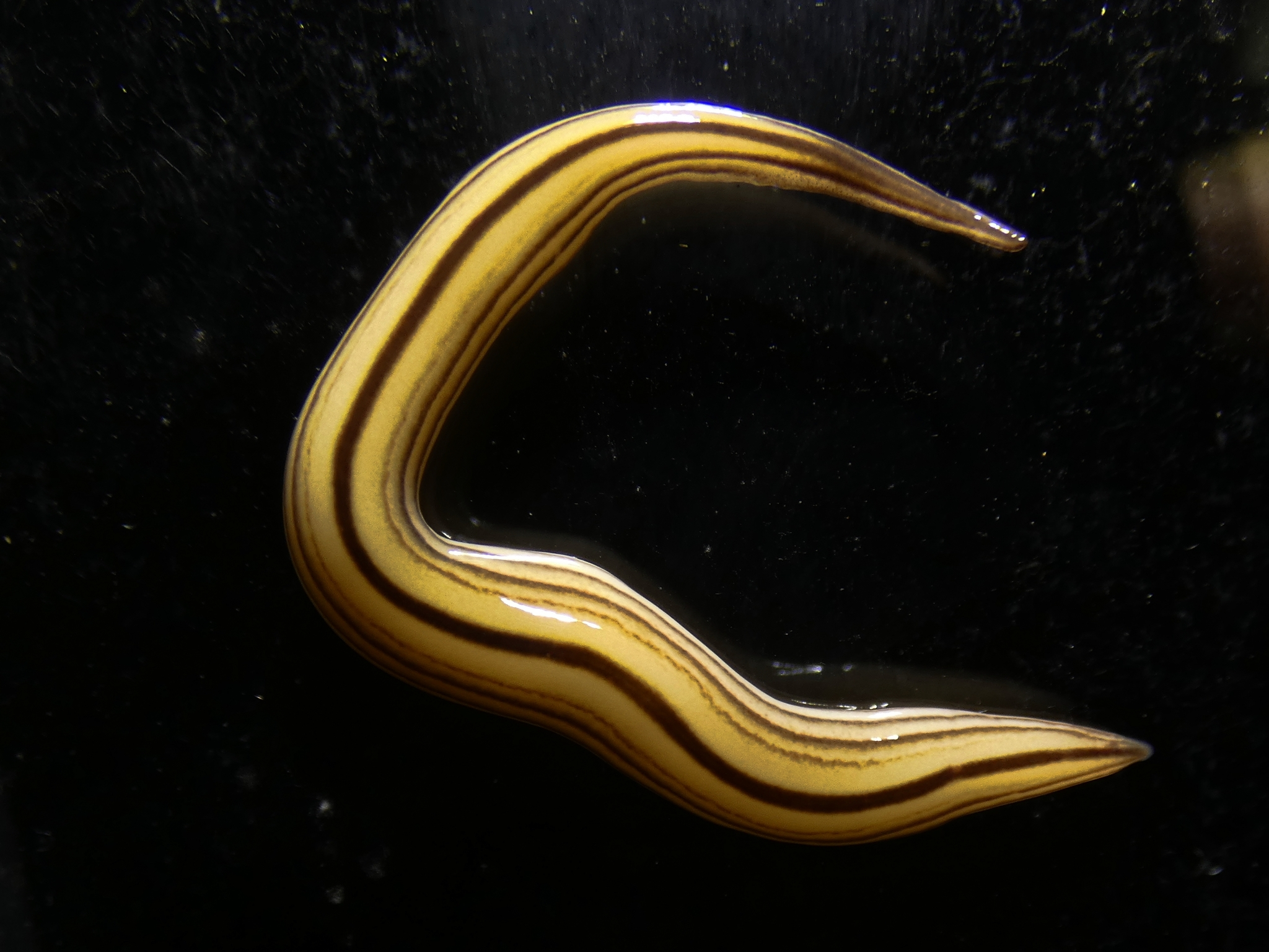

Scientific classification
- Domain: Eukaryota
- Kingdom: Animalia
- Phylum: Platyhelminthes
- Order: Tricladida
- Family: Geoplanidae
- Genus: Australopacifica
- Species: A. regina

Binomial name
- Australopacifica regina (Dendy, 1892)

Synonyms
- Geoplana regina Dendy, 1892; Artioposthia regina (Dendy, 1892); Artioposthia regina (Dendy, 1892)

= Australopacifica regina =

Species of flatworm

Australopacifica regina is a species of land planarian in the family Geoplanidae, found in Australia in both Queensland and New South Wales.

== Background ==
It was first described in 1892 as Geoplana regina by Arthur Dendy. In 1899, Graff transferred to a new genus to give the name Artioposthia regina. In 1991, Ogren and Kawakatsu transferred it to the new genus, Australopacifica to give the current species name.
