= Bernard Bosanquet =

Bernard Bosanquet may refer to:

- Bernard Bosanquet (cricketer) (1877–1936), English cricketer credited with inventing the googly
- Bernard Bosanquet (philosopher) (1848–1923), English philosopher
