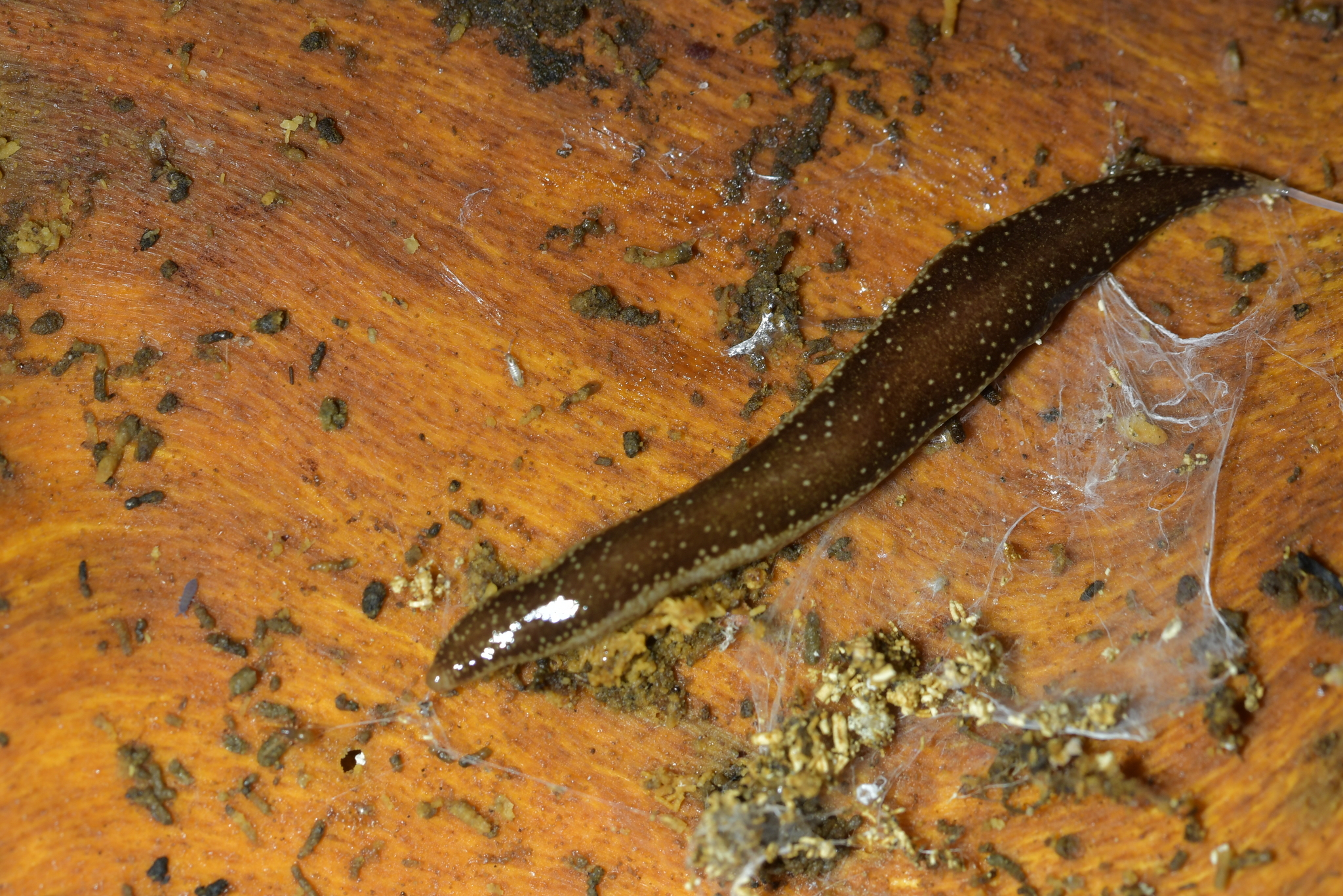
- Karori, New Zealand

Scientific classification
- Domain: Eukaryota
- Kingdom: Animalia
- Phylum: Platyhelminthes
- Order: Tricladida
- Family: Geoplanidae
- Genus: Australopacifica
- Species: A. spectabilis

Binomial name
- Australopacifica spectabilis Dendy, 1894

Synonyms
- Geoplana spectabilis Dendy, 1894

= Australopacifica spectabilis =

Species of flatworm

Australopacifica spectabilis is a species of carnivorous land planarian in the family Geoplanidae, endemic to New Zealand.
