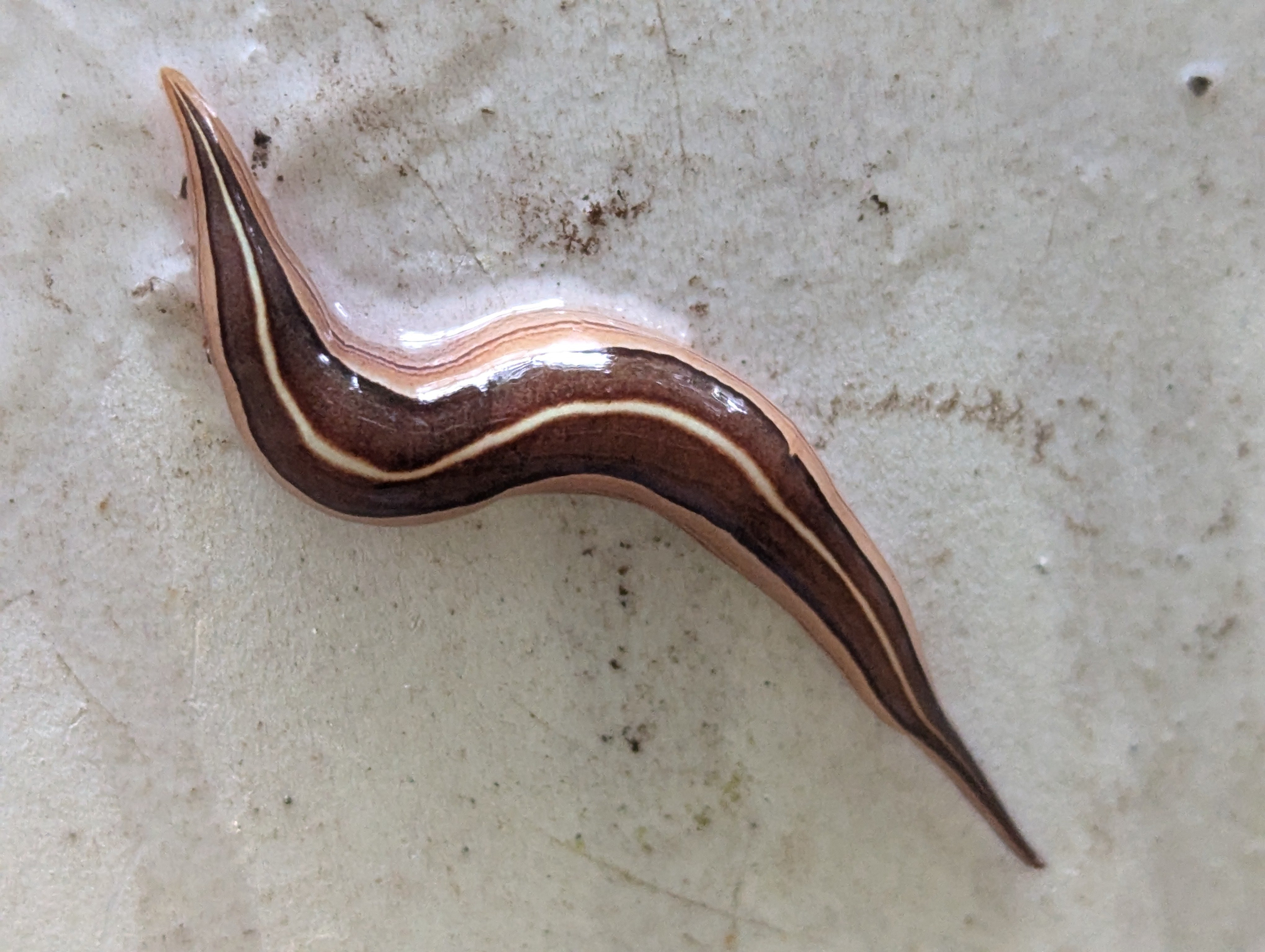

Scientific classification
- Kingdom: Animalia
- Phylum: Platyhelminthes
- Order: Tricladida
- Family: Geoplanidae
- Genus: Australopacifica
- Species: A. scaphoidea

Binomial name
- Australopacifica scaphoidea Steel 1900

Synonyms
- Artioposthia scaphoidea, (Steel, 1900); Geoplana elegans Steel, 1897; Geoplana scaphoidea Steel, 1900

= Australopacifica scaphoidea =

Species of flatworm

Australopacifica scaphoidea, the skiff planarian, is a species of carnivorous land planarian in the family Geoplanidae.

First described as Geoplana scaphoidea by Thomas Steel in 1900. A variable brown colour, 60 to 70 mm long and 4 to 5 mm wide when crawling, usually with stripes. The worm is native to Queensland and possibly northern New South Wales. Spread by the plant trade, this species is now found in other parts of Australia.
