= Mary Dendy Hospital =

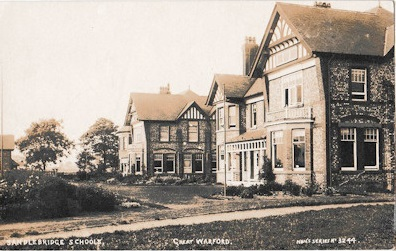
- The Sandlebridge Schools (latterly referred to as the Mary Dendy Hospital)

- Location in Cheshire

Geography
- Location: Great Warford, Cheshire, England, United Kingdom
- Coordinates: 53.294°N 2.286°W

Organisation
- Care system: Public NHS
- Type: Mental health

History
- Founded: 1908
- Closed: 1986

Links
- Lists: Hospitals in England

The Mary Dendy Hospital was a hospital for the "mentally subnormal" located in Great Warford, Cheshire, England.

== History ==
The hospital was founded as the Sandlebridge Boarding School or Sandlebridge Colony when the Lancashire and Cheshire Society for the Permanent Care of the Feeble-Minded converted two houses in Sandlebridge in Cheshire for use as schools in 1908. In 1933 the schools were renamed the Mary Dendy Homes in memory of Mary Dendy who had been the secretary (and later president) of the society.

Dendy had been involved in agitation for the reform of provision for the "mentally sub-normal", and gave evidence to the Royal Commission looking into the issue, which produced the Radnor Report, leading to the Mental Deficiency Act 1913. She repeated in her evidence to the commission, a view she had frequently expressed previously, that the mentally subnormal and the mentally ill should be recognised as separate problems, requiring different approaches, and hence the mentally subnormal required separate facilities and institutions distinct from the traditional lunatic asylum: the Sandlebridge facility was the first permanent residential care home for mentally deficient children in the United Kingdom and thus an exemplar for this approach.

The Mary Dendy Homes joined the National Health Service as the Mary Dendy Hospital in 1948 and it continued to accommodate mentally handicapped children until it closed in 1986.
