= Helen Bosanquet =

British social theorist and reformer (1860–1925)

- Helen Bosanquet, c. 1900
- Born: Helen Dendy; 10 February 1860; Manchester, England
- Died: 7 April 1925 (aged 65); Golders Green, London, England
- Education: Newnham College, Cambridge
- Occupations: Social theorist, reformer, economist
- Spouse: Bernard Bosanquet (m. 1895; died 1923)
- Relatives: Mary Dendy (sister); Arthur Dendy (brother)

Helen Bosanquet (née Dendy; 10 February 1860 – 7 April 1925) was an English social theorist, social reformer, and economist concerned with poverty, social policy, working-class life, and modern social work practices. Helen worked closely with the Charity Organisation Society (COS), using her direct experience with living among "the poor". Bosanquet focused much of her career on family, specifically working-class families, and their relationship with poverty. Helen was the wife of English philosopher Bernard Bosanquet.

== Biography ==
=== Early life ===
Helen Dendy was born in Manchester in 1860 to Reverend John Dendy and his wife, Sarah Beard (1831–1922), one of nine children, the fifth child and the youngest daughter of John Relly Beard. Helen was one of three children, Mary Dendy was her elder sister and her brother was biologist Arthur Dendy (1865–1925).

=== Education ===
Helen and her sister were educated at home by a governess. In 1886, at the age of twenty-six, she attended Newnham College, Cambridge, with an academic ambition to study moral sciences. Her interest in moral philosophy led to her career and time with the London Ethical Society. She obtained a first-class degree in 1889. However, she failed to get any academic position.

== Career ==
Following graduation, Bosanquet moved to London, where she joined the Charity Organisation Society (COS), a body committed to rationalizing London's huge collection of private charities. The COS originally focused on the coordination of philanthropic efforts at a local level, they shifted their focus to concern actively and effectively working with charity for long-term effects. She became organizer and district secretary of the society's Shoreditch branch. She was closely tied with the COS for the duration of her life. She was also active in the London Ethical Society, where she met the philosopher Bernard Bosanquet (1848–1923), whom she married on 13 December 1895. Both Helen and her husband provided essential theoretical work that defined case work. Case workers, according to Bosanquet, are to reach a "true" understanding of the perspective of those they are helping She abandoned her paid employment to focus on transcribing her ideas in writing. In addition to an active public career as a theorist and publicist for the COS, she worked as a translator of German philosophy and sociology, and as a collaborator with her husband.

She was appointed a member of the Royal Commission on the Poor Laws in 1905, where she defended the role of private charities over public welfare programs. She was a major influence on the Majority Report (Poor Law), published in 1909, which arose out of the commission. She worked alongside social reformer, Beatrice Webb, and the two were often in disagreement. Webb wanted to abolish the Poor Laws and have state-run social services, while Bosanquet wanted to keep some aspects of the Poor Laws.

=== Poverty ===
According to Bosanquet, the "problem of poverty," or the visible existence of deprivation, and was a phenomenon many, like Bosanquet, sought to explain. The COS had viewed poverty as a problem of the poor, leading to their work, and her work within the COS, to find solutions and approaches to charitable giving. She stressed the potential for development of case work and remained optimistic of its potential, as well as the potential of working-class families. She also emphasizes the important of understanding poverty in terms of an individual's capacity to deal with it. She used the COS to relay that one way to do this is to work with the individual and their family to focus on rising above this economic circumstance and establish long-term solutions. In Bosanquet's work, "The Poverty Line," she investigates the origination of the poverty line and the meaning it holds in our society. The poverty line is defined as a sharp division between those of our people who are poor and those who are not poor. She strives to demolish the concept of the poverty line, using the importance of evidence, revision and criticism.

=== Class ===
Bosanquet argued that working-class individuals should be assisted to rise above their economic misfortune. She also emphasized the importance of different classes becoming accustomed with one another (the rich and poor).

== Notable works ==
=== "A Study in Women's Wages" ===
In 1902 Bosanquet had a much publicized exchange of views with Seebohm Rowntree, in which she questioned his findings about the extent and the causes of poverty in York. One of these works included the article "A Study in Women’s Wages" which was published as part of The Economic Journal. This article lobbied for an increase in the training of women for skilled jobs. As a result, women would gain better working conditions and wages.

=== "The Lines of Industrial Profit" ===
In her article "The Lines of Industrial Profit", Bosanquet offered the idea that businessmen of the same trade must agree on fixed prices to reap larger profits and provide their workers with better wages.

=== "The Divorce Laws of England and Wales" ===
In her piece, "The Divorce Laws of England and Wales", she offers the idea that young people should not be forced to take a permanent vow as the longevity of a marriage depends on several conditions.

=== "The Strength of the People: A Study in Social Economics" ===
In this work, Bosanquet analyses the principle of progress in the human mind. She takes an economic and philanthropic approach on the basis of what distribution produces the greatest happiness and serves the needs of individuals.

== Legacy ==
=== Social work ===
Bosanquet also played a key role in the development of social work in Britain. She suggested that social workers needed formal education as well as professional skills. She influenced the syllabus of the COS School of Sociology (founded 1903), which in 1912 became the Social Science Department of the London School of Economics. Bosanquet influenced what was taught that covered both practical skills and general education.

She was also outspoken about women's rights. She commented on supporting voters for women. She spoke on the burdens that working-class women face because of disenfranchisement.

=== Sociology ===
Bosanquet's work was appreciated as "cultural sociology" because of her commentary on family and neighborhood poverty.

Her influential English translation of Christoph von Sigwart's Logic appeared in 1895.

=== Writing career ===
Following the death of Bernard Bosanquet in 1923, Helen arranged for the manuscript of Three Chapters on the Nature of Mind to be published. She wrote a memoir of her husband's life and it was published in 1924. She died in Golders Green, London in 1925, having suffered from ill health for some years. Between 1909 and 1921 she edited the Charity Organization Review, a main component of the COS.

== Critiques ==
In 1914, she published "Social Work in London: A History of the London Charity Organization Society" and controversially wrote that "though authorized, the history is not official." She discusses the controversial principles of the COS of ideas on state aid and charity. Historians and critics harshly reviewed her book.

Bosanquet also critiqued Charles Booth's work on the Survey of Life and Labor, arguing that it threatened the basis of moral philanthropy. She also published a pamphlet, undated but published after 1900, after attacking both Booth and Rowntree's work.

== Notable quotes ==
"I have always held that poverty and pain, disease and health are evils of greatly less importance than they appear except in so far as they lead to weakness of life and character; and that true philanthropy aims at increasing strength more than at the correct and immediate relief of poverty…"

"The working-women of England are indeed in a very sorry plight, and that if knights-errant were still to the fore they would find work enough for lance and sword in freeing their sisters from the tyranny by which they are oppressed"

"It seems to be almost inevitable that the man who accepts a subordinate economic position in the Family degenerates into a loafer and a tyrant."

"In the Residuum these qualities are entirely absent. In place of foresight we find the happy faith which never fails, that 'something will turn up,' and instead of self-control the impulsive recklessness which may lead indifferently to a prodigal generosity, or an almost inconceivable selfishness. The true type of this class lives in the present moment only; not only is he without foresight, he is almost without memory, in the sense that bis past is so completely past that he has no more organized experience to refer to than a child. Hence his life is one incoherent jumble from beginning to end."

== Works ==
- Helen Bosanquet, "The Name and the House," London: MacMillan, 1926.
- Social Work in London: A History of the London Charity Organization Society" (1914)
- Aspects of the Social Problem (1895)
- Rich and Poor (1896)
- The Standard of Life and Other Studies (1898)
- The Strength of the People (1902)
- The Poor Law Report of 1909 : A Summary Explaining the Defects of the Present System and the Principal Recommendations of the Commission, so far as Relates to England and Wales (1909)
- "The Family" (1906)
