= History of London (1900–1939) =

This article covers the history of the English city of London through the early 20th century, from 1900 to the outbreak of World War II in 1939. London entered the 20th century at the height of its influence as the capital of the largest empire in history, but the new century was to bring many challenges. London was the largest city in the world from about 1825 until it was overtaken by New York City in 1925.

== Edwardian London ==
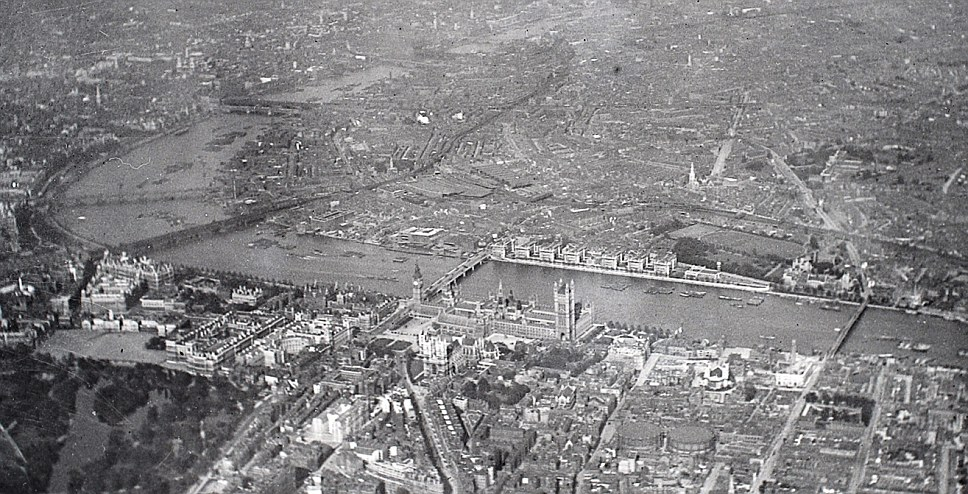
Aerial picture of London Westminster in 1909, taken from a helium balloon

The years between Queen Victoria's death in 1901 and the start of the First World War in 1914 were years of growth and general prosperity, though the extreme inequalities which had characterized Victorian London continued. By 1900 one out of five Britons lived in London, with the population of roughly 5 million in 1900 rising to over 7 million by 1911.

Edwardian London was not without conflict, characterized principally by the burgeoning Women's Suffrage movement. The city became the epicenter for the nationwide suffrage movement spearheaded by Emmeline Pankhurst and her Women's Social and Political Union, which moved its headquarters from Manchester to London in 1906 so it could better exert pressure on the nation's political leaders. With 34 of its national 90 branch offices based in London, the capital was the largest base of support for the W.S.P.U. in the UK. Protests and demonstrations intensified during these years, reaching a peak between 1912 and 1914 as the movement militarized. Hyde Park hosted two major suffragette rallies in 1908 and 1913, the former counting over 250,000 attendees. London was the site of seminal events in the movement, including Black Friday, when a suffragette march from Caxton Hall to the Palace of Westminster dissolved into conflicts with the police, leading to 115 arrests, 2 deaths, and widespread allegations of sexual assault inflicted upon the female protesters.*

=== Architecture and building ===
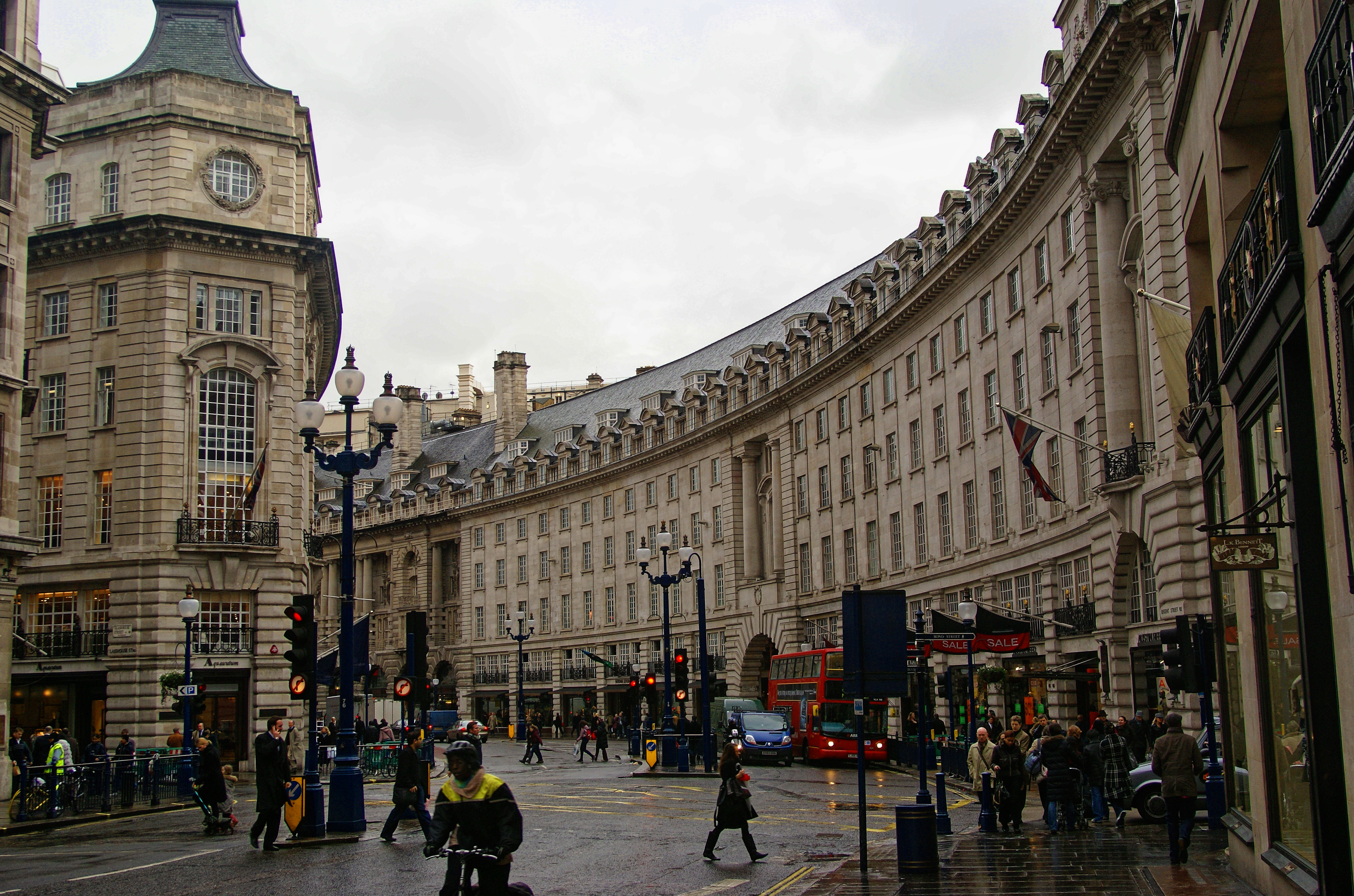
Regent's Quadrant, completed in 1928, capped a decades-long rebuilding program in the West End

Architecturally there was much rebuilding in Central London during the Edwardian years in the prevalent styles of Beaux-Arts and Edwardian Baroque. Much of the construction was delayed by the Great War between 1914 and 1918, and completed in the 1920s. Major government buildings erected during this time were County Hall (1911–22), the seat of the London County Council, the War Office (1906), and the Port of London Authority Building (1912–1922). The decrepit buildings of John Nash's Regent Street, originally constructed in the 1820s and encompassing a large swathe of the West End between Regent's Park in the north and Waterloo Place near St. James's Park in the south, were rebuilt entirely between 1905 and 1927. The simple Regency buildings of the Nash period were replaced with grand new commercial buildings faced in Portland stone lining Regent Street, Oxford Circus, and Regent's Quadrant, transforming the appearance of the West End. The Mall was re-envisioned as a grand parade route for state pageantry, which involved the building of Admiralty Arch (1911), the re-facing of Buckingham Palace (1911–1912), and the erection of the Victoria Memorial (1911).

In Holborn, a large swathe of the slum area known as Clare Market was demolished to make way for Kingsway (1905), a grand 100 ft. wide boulevard with an underground tramway tunnel that stretches from The Strand north to High Holborn and Southampton Row. Aldwych, the crescent-shaped road connecting Kingsway with the Strand, was lined with new theatres, hotels and diplomatic commissions like Australia House (built between 1913 and 1918).

=== Transport ===
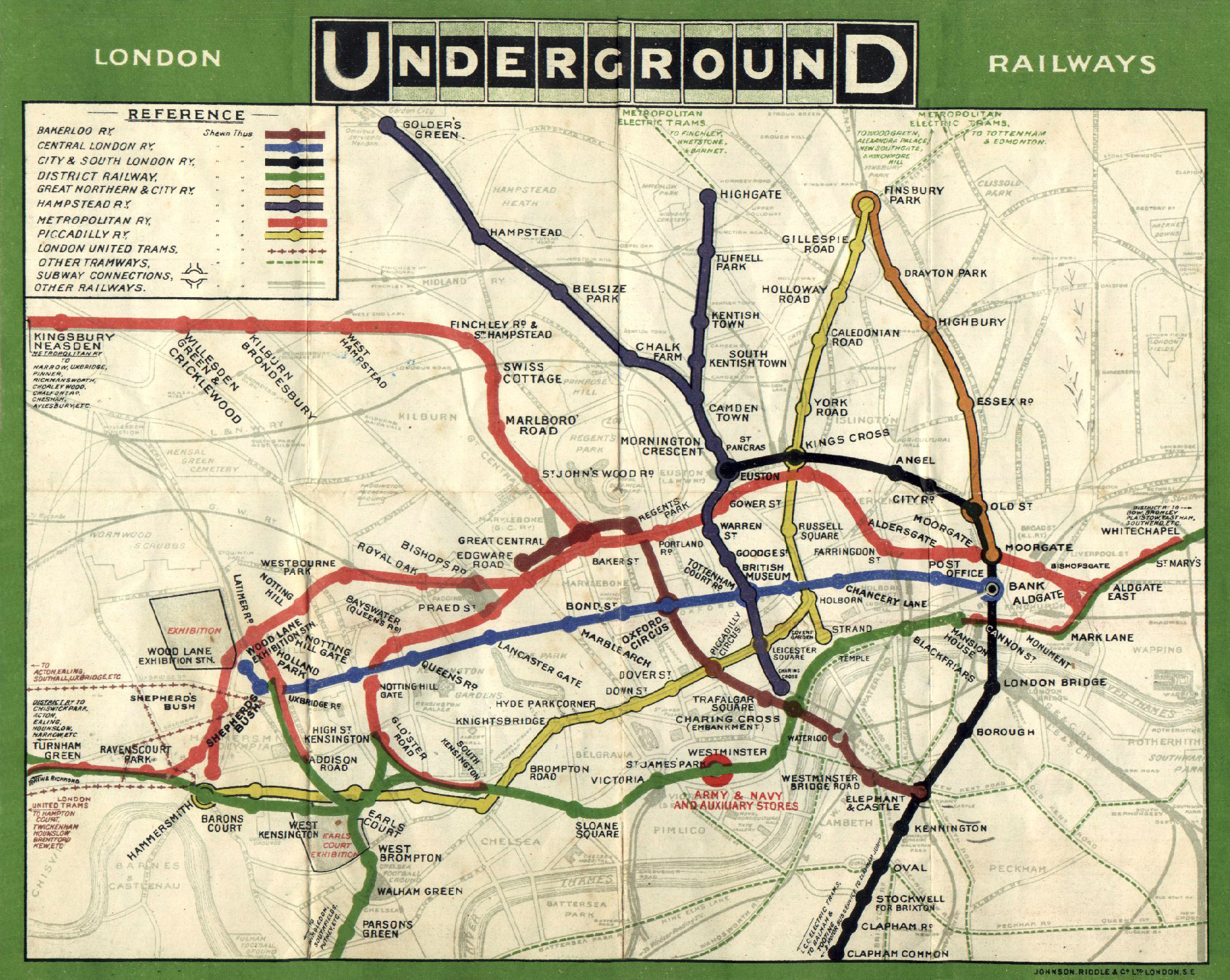
The first map of the London Underground from 1908, showing the 3 new lines opened in 1906-7

The Edwardian period witnessed a major expansion of the London Underground fueled by the advent of electrification, deep-level tunneling via the tunneling shield, and investment from the United States and other sources. Four new deep-level lines opened between 1900 and 1907, as well as extensions and electrifications of the older lines from the previous century. The Central London Railway (Central Line) was the first to open in the 20th century, on 30 July 1900. At first it ran between Bank in the City of London and Shepherd's Bush, but in 1908 it was extended westwards to White City in time for the Franco-British Exhibition and the 1908 Summer Olympics. The Metropolitan Railway and the District Railway were extended to the west reaching Ruislip and Uxbridge in 1904. The electrification of the formerly steam-operated MR and DR began in 1905. 1906 saw the opening of the Baker Street and Waterloo Railway (now the Bakerloo line) in March, originally running between Lambeth North and Baker Street, and the Great Northern, Piccadilly and Brompton Railway (now the Piccadilly line) in December, running between Hammersmith and Finsbury Park. In 1907, the Charing Cross, Euston and Hampstead Railway (CCE&HR) was opened, running between Charing Cross and terminating in North London via Camden Town at Archway and Golders Green. Fifty of the Edwardian era stations were designed by Leslie Green and are distinctive for their semi-circular windows, glazed tile facades in oxblood red, and green-tiled ticket halls.

The three underground lines which opened between 1906 and 1907 were owned by the Underground Electric Railways Company of London (UERL), which would move to expand and consolidate by gradually acquiring not only underground competitors, but the major bus and tramway companies. Only London's oldest line, the Metropolitan Railway, along with its subsidiaries, and the Waterloo & City line remained outside the control of the UERL by 1913. This competition between the UERL and its remaining competitors did not prevent them from entering into a joint marketing agreement in 1908 which united the entire network for the first time as the "Underground" in publicity, signage, maps, and through coordinated fares.

== Urban poverty ==
Round About a Pound a Week, a report by the Fabian Society of an intervention between 1909 and 1913, describes the lives of the "respectable poor"; one in five children died in their first year, and hunger, illness, and colds were the norm. A 1909 report of the Poor Law Commission found that one-third of the East End's 900,000 strong population lived in conditions of extreme poverty. The report also detailed the squalor of conditions in these areas, with an average of 25 houses sharing every one lavatory and fresh-water tap between them. One response to a dire lack of sanitation in London's poorest areas was the provision of communal washhouses for bathing and clothes-washing; an average of 60,000 people each week used the 50 such bathhouses which existed across the city in 1910.

The publication of the third edition of Charles Booth's monumental 17-volume Life and Labour of the People of London gave further insight into the conditions of London's poorest. Throughout the first four decades of the twentieth century, the London County Council continued a program of slum clearance and the building of "model dwellings" in the poorest areas like Spitalfields, Whitechapel and Bethnal Green. While sanitation and living conditions improved, the percentage of London's population living in poverty was estimated at 8.7% in the late-1920s, rising to about 10% in 1934 as the Great Depression took its toll.

Poor Londoners were condemned to live in densely populated, unsanitary and polluted slums while the middle-classes could move to the expanding suburbs for fresh-air and space. Such conditions made those born and raised in London's slums noticeably unhealthy, weak, and malnourished in appearance. Recruitment drives for the Boer War of 1899–1902 revealed that 7 in 9 working-class Londoners were unfit for service. In his 1903 book on conditions in the East End, The People of the Abyss, the American author Jack London wrote of the poor Londoner that:

"the air he breathes, and from which he never escapes, is sufficient to weaken him mentally and physically, so that he becomes unable to compete with the fresh virile life from the country hastening on to London Town...It is incontrovertible that the children grow up into rotten adults, without virility or stamina, a weak-kneed, narrow-chested, listless breed, that crumples up and goes down in the brute struggle for life with the invading hordes from the country."

== World War I ==
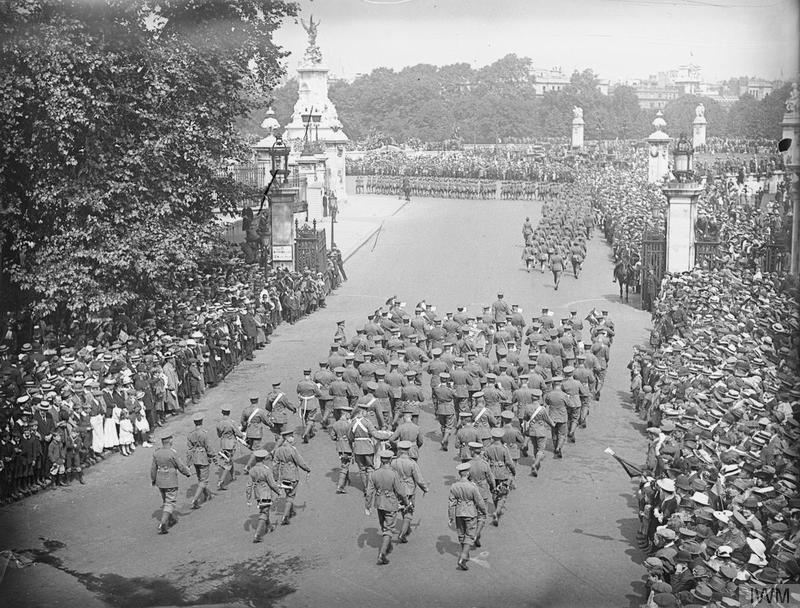
A military parade taking place in front of Buckingham Palace during the First World War

During World War I, London experienced its first bombing raids, carried out by German zeppelin airships and later by aeroplanes. On 31 May 1915 the first aerial bombing raid on London was carried out by a zeppelin, which dropped high explosives over the East End and the docks, killing seven people. There were a further ten airship raids over London during 1915 and 1916 and a further one in 1917.

By 1917, British success at shooting down airships persuaded the German military to instead use aeroplanes to attack London. The first attack by bombers occurred in May 1916 when a single plane attacked the East End. By May 1917 a squadron of Gotha biplanes was assembled. On 13 June 1917 the largest World War I air raid on London was carried out, resulting in about 160 deaths. In this raid fourteen Gotha bombers bombed numerous targets in the City and the East End, including the Fenchurch Street/Aldgate area, Royal Albert Dock, Liverpool Street Station and Upper North Street School in Poplar. Eighteen children were killed at the school, causing public outrage. Further raids followed during 1917 and 1918. However, by May 1918 British air defences had improved sufficiently to start inflicting heavy German losses, and this persuaded Germany to call the raids off.

These air raids killed around 670 people, injured 1,960 and caused great terror among London's population, though of far greater impact was the number of Londoners who were killed in combat: about 124,000 young men never returned from the war.

The largest explosion in London's history, the Silvertown explosion, occurred during World War I. A munitions factory containing 50 tons of TNT exploded, killing 73 and injuring 400.

== 1920s ==
=== Interwar Expansion ===
The early 20th century, especially during the interwar years of the 1920s and 1930s, saw the geographical extent of London's urban area grew faster than at any point before or since. Most of the development was of suburban expansion into the neighbouring counties of Essex, Hertfordshire, Kent, Middlesex and Surrey. A preference for lower density suburban housing, typically semi-detached, by Londoners seeking a more "rural" lifestyle, superseded Londoners' old predilection for terraced houses. The rapid expansion of London during this period swallowed up large swathes of countryside. Fears over the loss of countryside led eventually to the introduction of the Metropolitan Green Belt, restricting urban growth.

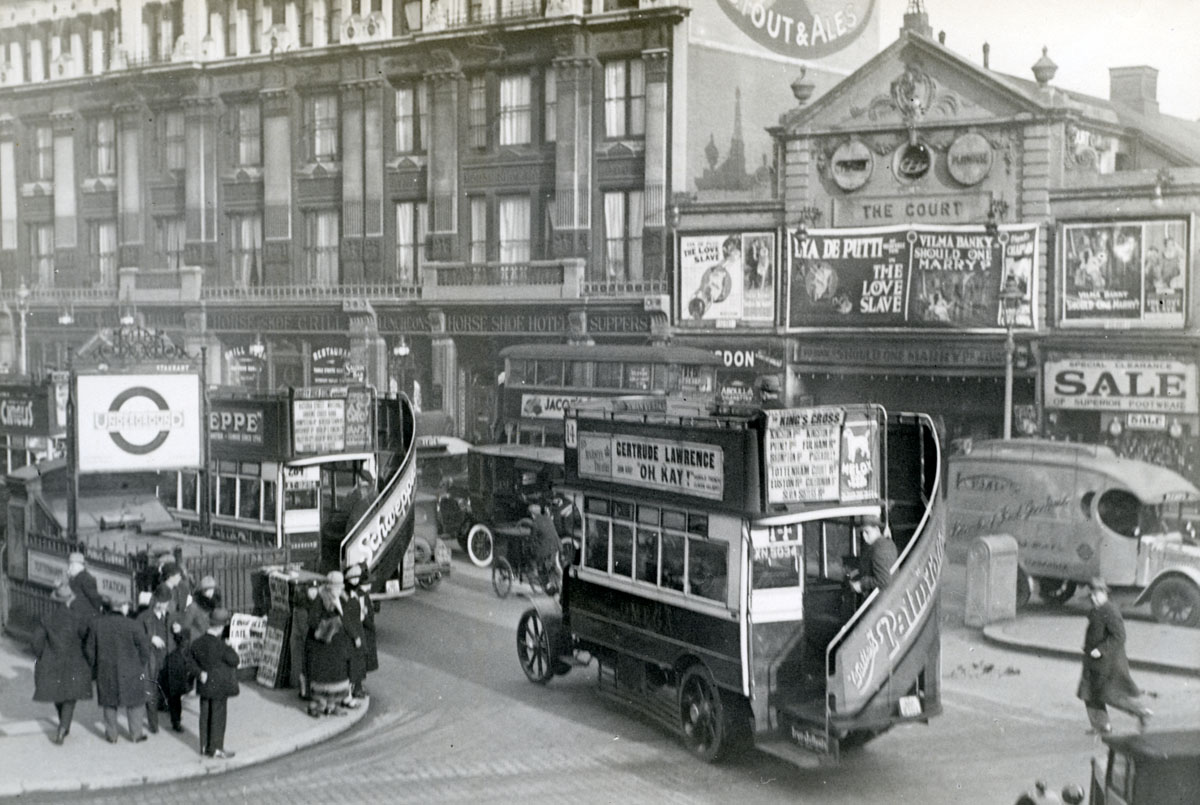
Tottenham Court Road in 1927

This meant that London outgrew the boundaries of the County of London, which led to calls by the London County Council for the creation of a single Greater London authority covering the entire urban area, although this was rejected by the Royal Commission on London Government in 1921.

The population of London's urban area reached its all-time peak of about 8.6 million in 1939. All of this growth occurred outside of the boundaries of the County of London; the population of which actually fell during the interwar years from 4.5 to 4 million.

Large numbers of Jewish immigrants fleeing from Nazi Germany, settled in London during the 1930s, mostly in the West End.

=== High rise housing ===
The fierce debates over high-rise housing that took place after 1945 were presaged by an acrimonious debate in the 1920s and 1930s. It pitted enthusiastic advocates and angry critics of multistorey flats for social housing. On the political left, there was firm opposition to what was denounced as 'barracks for the working classes'. Reformers on the right called for multi-story solutions to overcrowding and high rents. One result were attempts to compromise by developing new solutions to urban living, focused especially on slum clearance and redevelopment schemes. The compromises generally sought to replace inhospitable slums with high-rise blocks served by lifts. In the Metropolitan Borough of Stepney they included John Scurr House (built 1936–1937), Riverside Mansions (1925–1928) and the Limehouse Fields project (1925 but never built).

=== Architecture and Building ===
As the suburbs expanded exponentially, in Central London much of the 1920s were spent completing major construction works begun before the First World War and delayed by labour and material shortages. A trend that emerged during the '20s and '30s was the sale and loss of many of London's grandest private homes in the exclusive areas of Mayfair and St. James's. The British aristocracy, unable to support the costs of maintaining large houses in London because of sharp rises in income and estate taxes, sold their homes to private developers, who built new commercial and residential premises. This was accelerated by the onset of the Great Depression in the '30s. These included Grosvenor House and Dorchester House on Park Lane, both of which were rebuilt as luxury hotels (the Grosvenor House Hotel and The Dorchester), Devonshire House, Chesterfield House and Norfolk House.

After the exhibition of Art Deco architecture at the 1925 International Exhibition of Modern Decorative and Industrial Arts in Paris, London architects began to adopt the sleek new style with fervor. Art Deco became the dominant style for new construction in London through the late 1930s, which represented a forward-thinking and innovative new aesthetic in contrast to London's ubiquitous Victorian architecture. Major examples built during this period were media headquarters on Fleet Street, the Daily Telegraph building (1928) and the Daily Express Building (1932), in addition to the BBC Broadcasting House on Langham Place. The style lent itself particularly well to large industrial structures like Battersea Power Station (1934), the Hoover Building (1932–37), and the Carerras Cigarette Factory. Other outstanding examples of Art Deco can be seen in Ideal House in the City of London, and Senate House, the 19-story headquarters of the University of London in Bloomsbury and the tallest Art Deco building in London.

=== Transport ===
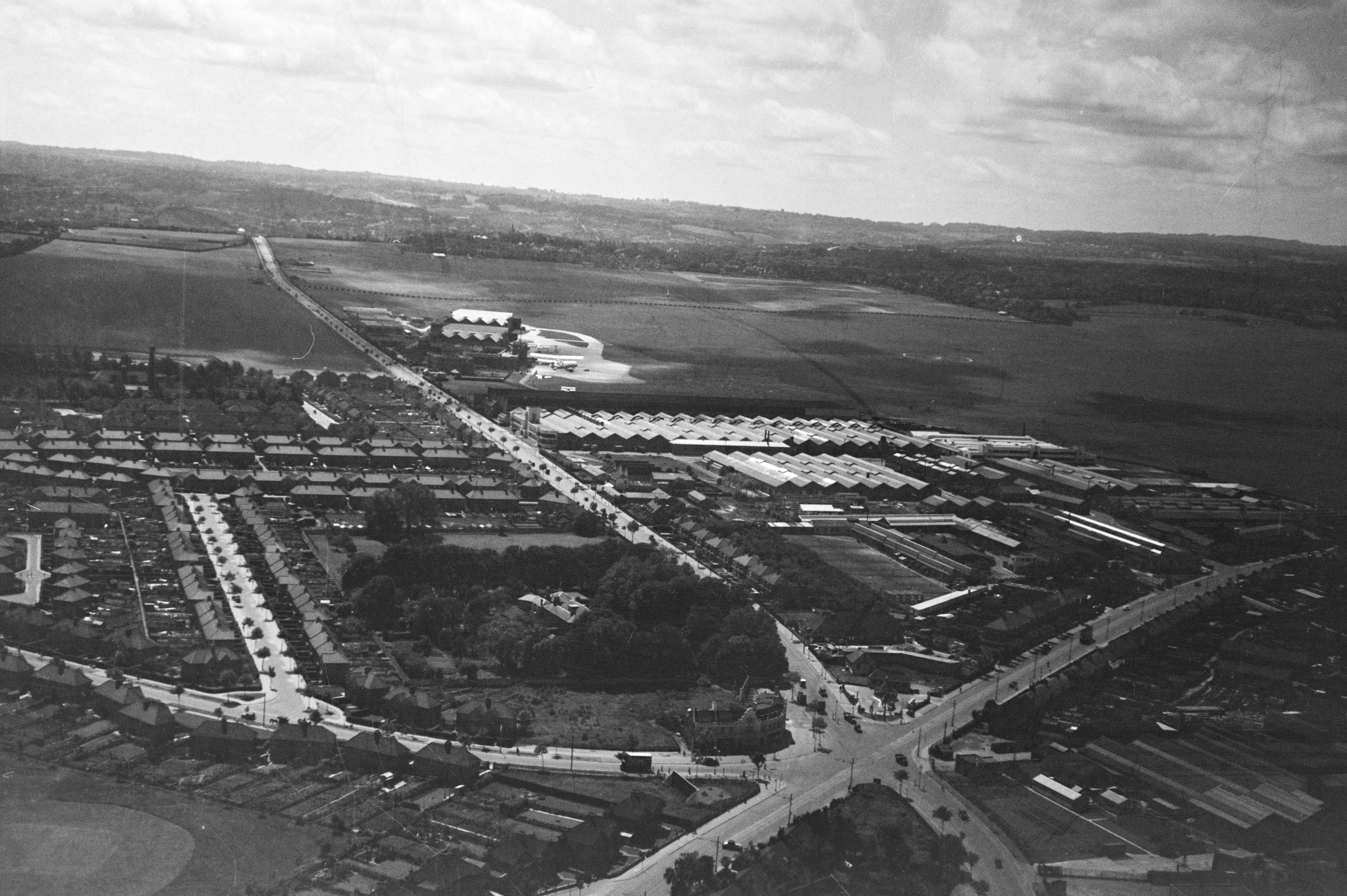
Aerial shot of London's first international airport at Croydon, in the 1930s

The rapid growth of London during this period was facilitated by a rapid expansion and modernisation of transport networks. A large tram network was constructed by the London County Council, through the LCC Tramways. And the first motorbus service began in the 1900s (decade).

Large scale electrification of London's commuter railways took place during the interwar period, mostly by the Southern Railway, and the London Underground system was expanded beyond London's northern suburbs stimulating the rapid development of new outer suburbs in areas such as Hendon, Southgate, Stanmore, High Barnet and Edgware. In 1926, the CCE&HR was joined with the City and South London Railway, creating the Northern line, as it would later come to be known, via connections between the two lines at Kennington and Camden Town. In 1933, the London Passenger Transport Board was created to coordinate transport over a large area of south-east England. The road network was modernised with a network of arterial roads being constructed in the 1920s.

Major infrastructure projects were completed in the interwar years. The most important was the expansion of the Port of London dock networks with the completion of the King George V Dock, which increased capacity by 10%, the 10 acre Quebec Dock, and a lock system from Blackwall Reach to the South Dock in Rotherhithe. Existing docks (the Royal Albert and Royal Victoria docks) were deepened and expanded to accommodate larger ships, while the deep-water port of Tilbury on the Thames Estuary was expanded as well.

In 1920, two airfields created during the First World War to serve aerial defenses against German zeppelin raids were combined to create London's first international airport, Croydon Airport, also known simply as London Airport. This would serve as London's sole international airport until the post-World War 2 era. From London Airport, Britain's first transcontinental airline, Imperial Airways, based its Empire-wide flight network. This began in 1925 with flights to Cairo and Karachi via Paris. From 1932, regular flights were established from London to far-flung corners of the British Empire like Singapore, Hong Kong, Khartoum, Kenya and Cape Town.

== Economy ==
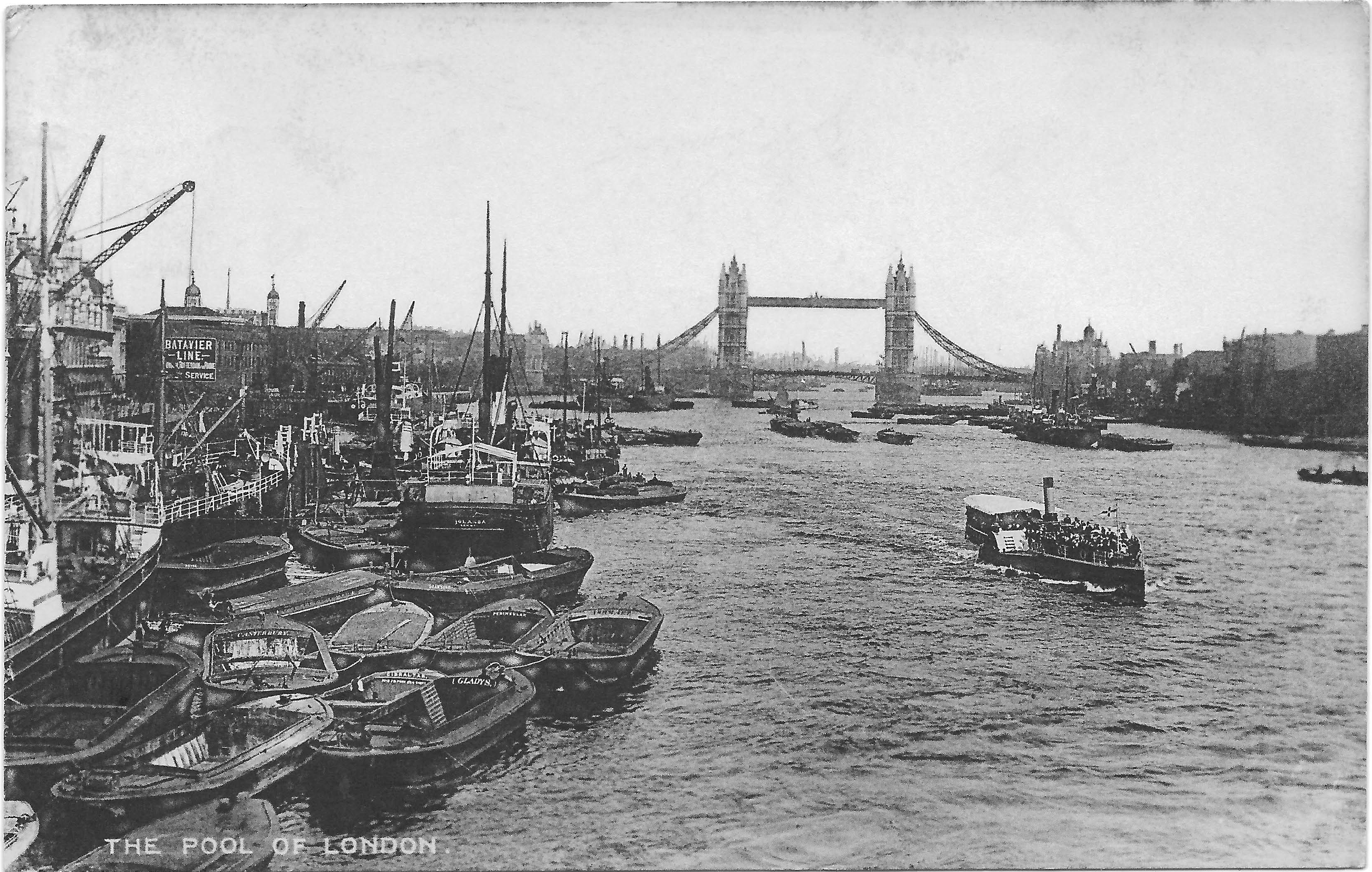
The Pool of London, 1938. The Port of London remained the largest port in the world and a major sector of the city's economy

Prior to World War One, Britain was the world's economic superpower. Despite its flourishing economy, Britain was simply not prepared for the economic impact that the war would have. While London remained fairly prosperous relative to the rest of Britain during the interwar years, their economy still experienced an inevitable decline. After the beginning of World War One in 1914, Britain experienced a massive financial crisis due to market panic. There were several reasons why London was able to remain relatively prosperous throughout the interwar years. One major reason was the significant amount of population growth London experienced during these years. In fact, London's population increased from 7.25 million in 1911 to 8.73 million in 1939. Another major aspect that helped fuel the economy was the Pax Britannica, which brought business through an increase in shipping, imports, and even investments.

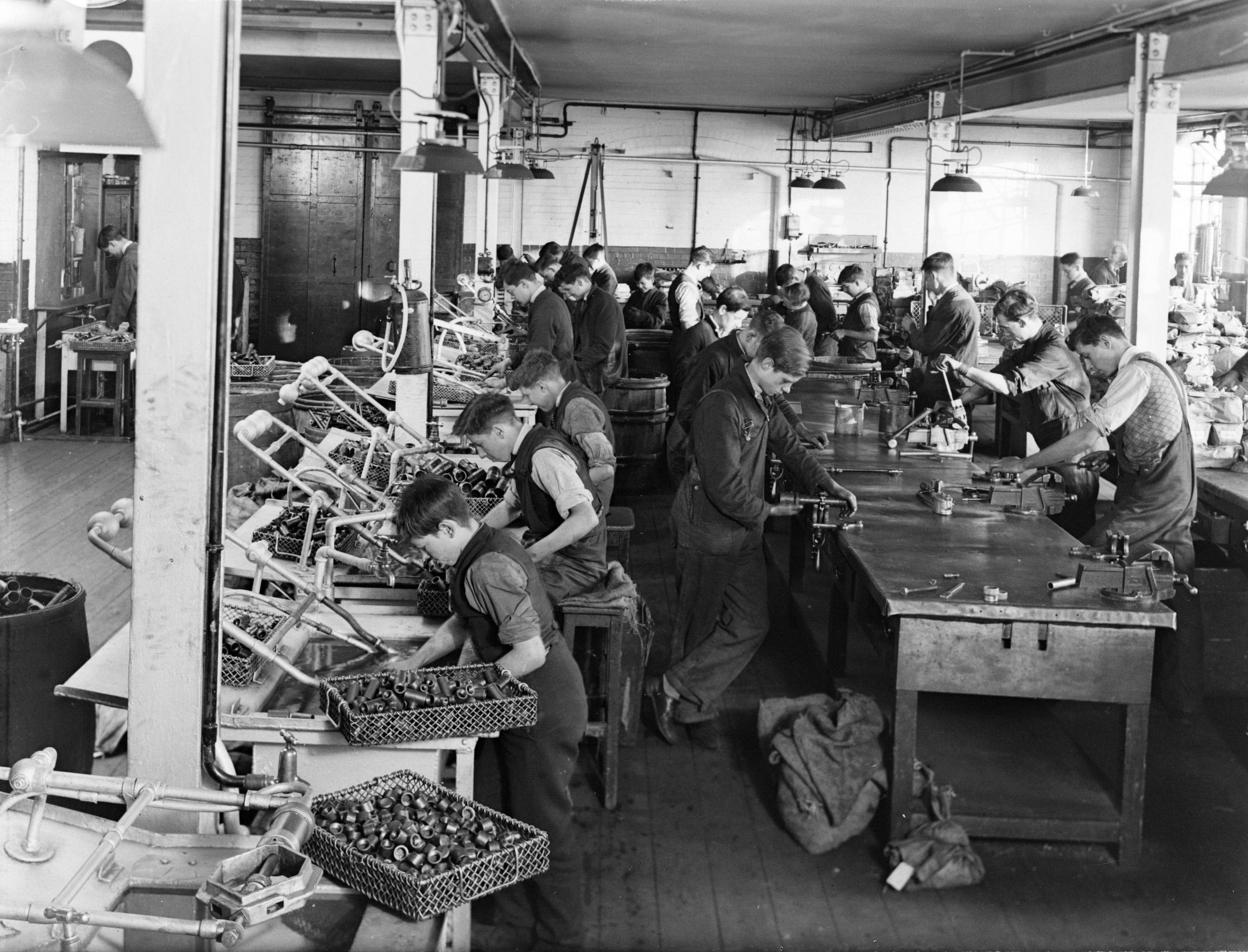
Gas Light & Coke Company in London, 1933

Obviously, London was faced with the huge economic demand of war. In fact, Britain spent over £3,251,000,000 from 1914 to 1918. The government took action to raise money and revive the economy; Government officials raised direct taxes of property and income, took out large international loans, and increased the printing of money. And while these economic tactics were ultimately successful for all of Britain, London still had to endure rising unemployment and was forced to adapt its workforce. In fact, the unemployment rate for those workers who were covered by national insurance in London increased from 7 percent to 10 percent just from July to August 1914. A major reason why unemployment didn't get too high during the interwar years was due to the significant increase of women in the workforce. While there was a relatively high number of women in the workforce prior to the war, the number continued to rise; "Women’s employment went from 23.6% of the working age population in 1914 to between 37.7% and 46.7% in 1918". The largest employer of women was the munitions industries – which were primarily employed by women at the time. By 1917, the munition factories in Britain accounted for 80 percent of all weapons and shells used by the British Army. Despite the huge role women played in the maintenance of the economy, they still only received around two-thirds of the pay that men received for the same jobs. "At the end of the first world war the combination of pent-up consumer demand, high money income, a large volume of liquid or near-liquid assets and a backlog of investment fuelled a boom in economic activity which lasted roughly one year, from March 1919 to April 1920".

London managed to escape the worst effects of the Great Depression – which spanned from 1929 until 1939. "Even in the dark days of the 1930s unemployment barely bit because London, unlike the industrial North, had never become dangerously over dependent on the Empire, but the Empire was in tact [sic]". Although most parts of the United Kingdom were facing rising unemployment rates and widespread poverty as early as 1929, London had an unemployment rate of 5.6 percent. The areas that were hit the hardest that were the ones most reliant on heavy industry – such as Northern Ireland, Scotland and Wales. London, on the other hand, had relatively little business in heavy industry and was more involved in some of the light industries – such as chemicals, electrical goods and automobiles.

== Politics ==
The London County Council for much of its early years was controlled by either the Progressive Party (allied to the Liberal Party) or the Municipal Reform Party (allied to the Conservative Party).

In 1934, the Labour Party led by Herbert Morrison won control of the LCC for the first time. The Labour Party would dominate the council until its abolition and replacement by the Greater London Council in 1965. Morrison was a dominant figure in local government in the 1920s and 1930s. He became mayor of Hackney and a member of the London County Council in 1922, and for a while was Minister of Transport in Ramsay MacDonald's cabinet. When Labour gained power in London in 1934, Morrison unified the bus, tram and trolleybus services with the Underground, by the creation of the London Passenger Transport Board (known as London Transport) in 1933., He led the effort to finance and build the new Waterloo Bridge. He designed the Metropolitan Green Belt around the suburbs and worked to clear slums, build schools, and reform public assistance.

In the East End during the 1930s, politically extreme parties of both right and left flourished. The Communist Party of Great Britain won a seat in the House of Commons, and the far-right British Union of Fascists received extensive support. Clashes between right and left culminated in the Battle of Cable Street in 1936.

== See also ==
- Timeline of London 1900s–1930s
