= Cryptozoa =

Small animals living in dark humid conditions

Cryptozoa is the collective name for small animals who live in darkness and under conditions of high relative humidity, as in the wet soil underneath rocks, decomposing tree bark etc. Examples include pseudoscorpions, slugs, centipedes and earwigs. The habitat of the cryptozoa allows avoidance of fluctuations of temperature and humidity, which makes the contained range of considerably different species quite remarkable. Moreover, cryptozoa are notable for their inclusion of often unnamed varieties of organisms.

The term "cryptozoic fauna" was originally coined by Arthur Dendy.

== Habitat ==
Sometimes referred to as the cryptozoic niche, the habitat allowing for cryptozoic life is characterized by a shielding of exterior light sources, with stable and cool temperature and high humidity. Forest humus and leaf litter can provide the necessary conditions for cryptozoic life in part because of the shielding from surrounding trees. Nonetheless, temperate woodlands are not the only ground for such a habitat: the tropics and the desert are often suitable for cryptozoa, such as scorpions or Solifugae.

== Examples ==
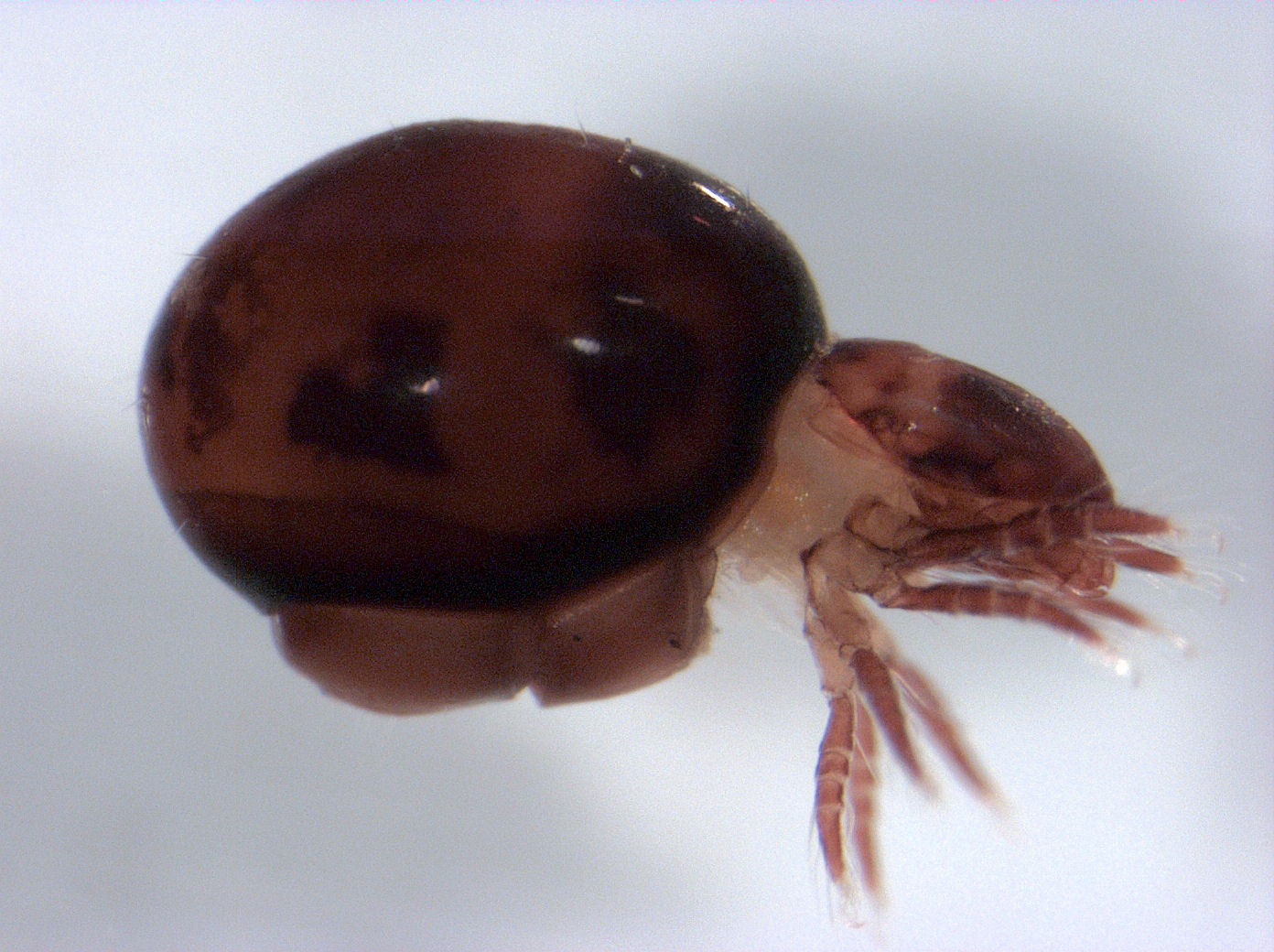
The Oribatida, which is considered a member of the cryptozoa.

Examples of the cryptozoa include land-planarians, amphipods, pill-woodlice, centipedes, pill-millipedes, thysanurans, false-scorpions and oribatid mites.
