= Mary Dendy =

British educationist (1855–1933)

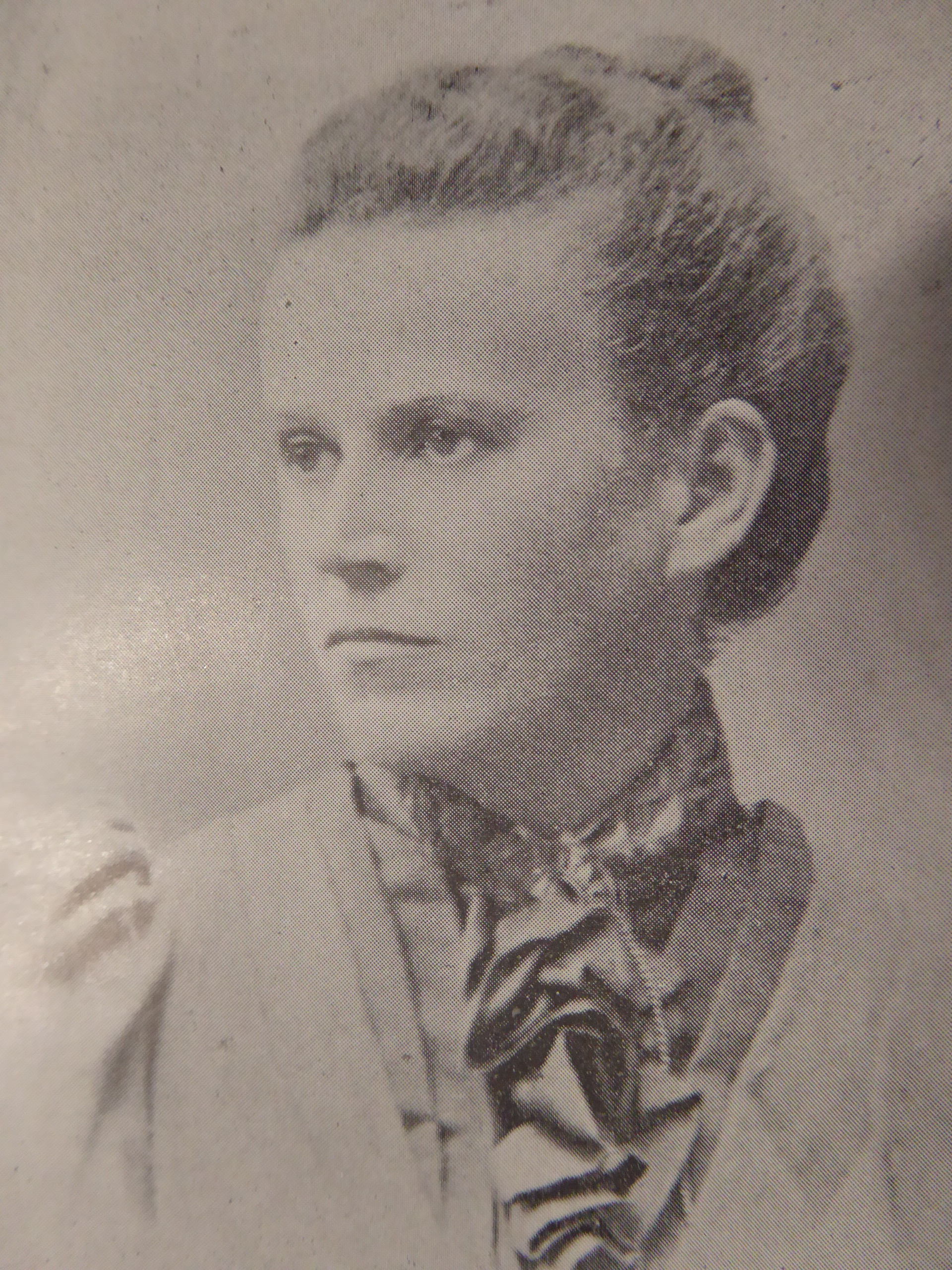
Mary Dendy, c.1901

Mary Dendy (28 January 1855 – 9 May 1933) was a British eugenicist and promoter of residential schools for mentally handicapped people, known as institutionalisation. Dendy was the driving force that established a colony for the "feeble-minded". Dendy believed in separate development to avoid crime and these people passing their problems on to their children. She joined the Eugenics Education Society.

== Life ==
Dendy was born in 1855 in Bryn Celyn, Llangoed in north Wales. She was the daughter of John Dendy, Unitarian minister, and his wife Sarah Beard (1831–1922), eldest daughter of Unitarian minister John Relly Beard. Her sister was the social reformer Helen Bosanquet and her brother was the biologist Arthur Dendy (1865–1925). She was home educated, completing her education with a year at Bedford College, London.

She started her work at Collyhurst Recreation Rooms, Manchester and with the Lancashire and Cheshire Women's Liberal Association and Suffrage Association. She was invited to sit on the Manchester School Board in February 1896. In this position she visited many schools in Manchester with a particular interest in the treatment of children with mental deficiency. In November 1897 she lost her seat on the School Board in an election, but at the Board's request continued her work. In October 1898, at a Memorial Hall meeting addressed by the Duchess of Sutherland the Lancashire and Cheshire Society for the Permanent Care of the Feeble Minded was established. In December 1898 Dendy read a paper before the Statistical Society published as "Feeble-minded Children."

Dendy became interested in the care of the "feeble-minded" in Manchester where she sat on the School Board from 1898. She believed that these children needed to be housed in institutions after conducting a survey of Manchester school children. She, aided by Dr Henry Ashby, persuaded the board to open special schools for the "feeble-minded". She believed that these children were the result of alcohol and poverty and without the intervention of society then these weaknesses would be inherited by future generations. In 1908 the Sandlebridge Boarding School or Sandlebridge Colony was opened by Incorporated Lancashire and Cheshire Society for the Permanent Care of the Feeble Minded. This charity had been started by members of the Manchester School Board starting in 1898. The schools were opened to residents who had been at Sandlebridge since 1902. This society ran the homes until the local authority took over en route to becoming part of the National Health Service (NHS) in 1945. In 1933 the society had changed the name to the Mary Dendy Homes, and these came to be known as the Mary Dendy Hospital.

Dendy was the driving force that established a colony for the "feeble-minded". Dendy believed in separate development to avoid crime and these people passing their problems on to their children. She joined the Eugenics Education Society some time after 1900.

She argued that it should be legally possible to confine children who were "feeble-minded" and the Mental Deficiency Act 1913 and the Elementary Education Act 1914 enabled this to happen. She argued that the only way to remove "this evil" was by preventing it. By 1910 she was arguing that the greatest danger was not the worst, but the mild cases of feeble-mindedness. She foresaw that these people could hide their problems and by using this device they could transmit their problems to the children of society.

== Works ==
- Feeble-Minded Children (1898)
- The Importance of Permanence in the Care of the Feeble-Minded (1901)
- Feebleness of Mind, Pauperism and Crime (1901)
- The Problem of the Feeble-Minded (1910)
- ...in articles in The Lancet (1902) and the Medical Magazine (1911)

== Sources ==
- ‘DENDY, Mary’, Who Was Who, A & C Black, an imprint of Bloomsbury Publishing plc, 1920–2008; online edn, Oxford University Press, Dec 2007 accessed 20 March 2013
- Obituary Manchester Guardian (10 May 1933)
- Obituary The Times (11 May 1933)
