= Scientific Charity Movement =

Defunct anti-poverty movement

The Scientific Charity Movement was a movement that arose in the early 1870s in the United States to stop poverty. It sought to move the role of supporting the impoverished away from government and religious organizations and into the hands of Charity Organization Societies (COS). These Societies claimed the altruistic goals of lifting the poor out of poverty through the means of education and employment, and did make some strides to address the problem of child labor. However, the Scientific Charity Movement's ideas were largely based on the theories of eugenics and social Darwinism, as reflected in the COS's treatment of the so-called "defective class" (insane, feeble-minded, blind, crippled, maimed, deaf and dumb, epileptic, criminal types, prostitutes, drug addicts, and alcoholics), who were moved from the streets and into insane asylums in order to prevent them from "breeding".

== Overview ==
=== Founders ===
The Scientific Charity Movement was born after the Panic of 1873, which was a collapse of the postwar economic boom from the American Civil War as well as the Franco-Prussian War that concluded in 1871. This led to the failure of American banks and financial panic that ultimately began an economic depression. The response from the white economic elites at the time, as agitation grew within the poor and working classes, resulted in a new social reform that attacked welfare and promoted rigorous, data-driven systems to acknowledge the "deserving" poor from the "undeserving".

Two of the biggest advocates for moving Charity Organization Societies to the United States were Josephine Lowell and S. Humphreys Gurteen. Lowell had been raised by a radical abolitionist family and firmly believed that idleness was one of the largest causes of poverty. She believed that before someone should be allowed to receive aid they should first be required to complete a labor test of some basic task like cutting wood. She was opposed to local governments giving relief as well as almsgiving and believed that the best way to help the poor was to "help them help themselves".

Gurteen, an English-born son of an Anglican preacher, is often attributed to bringing Charity Organization Societies to the United States. He was in support of consolidating already-existing groups who were providing aid and inspections in which COS agents would investigate those seeking aid to determine if they were faking or if they actually needed the aid.

=== The movement's role in ending poorhouses ===
Poorhouses and workhouses were tax-supported residential institutions where those who could not support themselves were sent to work as an alternative to welfare systems then known as "outdoor relief". Poorhouses arose before the Scientific Charity Movement arrived in the US. While some members of the movement were in favor of the poorhouses, the Scientific Charity Movement had an instrumental role in the ending of the poorhouses. They were also responsible for the banning of children being allowed in the poorhouses. As time went on the safety net provided by Progressive Era reforms (many of which were supported by the Charity organization societies), helped to keep more people out of the poorhouses and eventually they were phased out or converted into nursing homes for the elderly or disabled. Many of the poorhouses laid the groundwork for orphanages, general hospitals, and mental hospitals later on and while many of those in the poorhouses were able to reenter society, however those deemed unfit were moved to the asylums.

=== The invention of casework ===
The idea and procedure of impoverished family "cases" and "casework" was established under the Scientific Charity Movement. Using the ideas of eugenics and the new technique of in-depth investigation and interviews as a means of social control, caseworkers were tasked with sorting through and categorizing impoverished people into two separate classes: the "deserving" and the "undeserving". The Scientific Charity Movement also treated Black poverty as a separate issue from white poverty, and, believing Black people to be "inherently inferior", only provided their services to a small number of "deserving" white poor. They attempted to discourage everyone else from seeking aid. Those deemed not "morally pure" enough to receive charity or "strong" enough to support themselves were sent to an asylum or a poorhouse. Describing this system, political scientist Virginia Eubanks wrote "If the poorhouse was a machine that diverted the poor and working class from public resources, scientific charity was a technique of producing plausible deniability in elites."

=== Asylums ===
The COS created many asylums for the express purpose of removing the "defective classes" from society. Many of these asylums were made of the remnants of the old poorhouses, and the residents often endured poor treatment, forced sterilzations, and medical experimentation. Many of these asylums would continue on long after the Scientific Charity Movement was over and into the late 1960s.

== Reception ==
The Scientific Charity Movement is often seen as a dark spot in the history of American welfare reform. On the other hand, the Scientific Charity Movement improved on many of the previous welfare systems in place, including their work against the poorhouses which were eventually abolished in 1935, and their involvement in rights of workers and removing young children from the workforce. They also are responsible for laying the groundwork for many of the reforms which came about during the Great Depression.

== See also ==
- Effective altruism
- Scientific racism
