= Unitarian College, Manchester =

Unitarian seminary in Manchester, England

Coordinates: 53°27′0.11″N 2°13′4.50″W

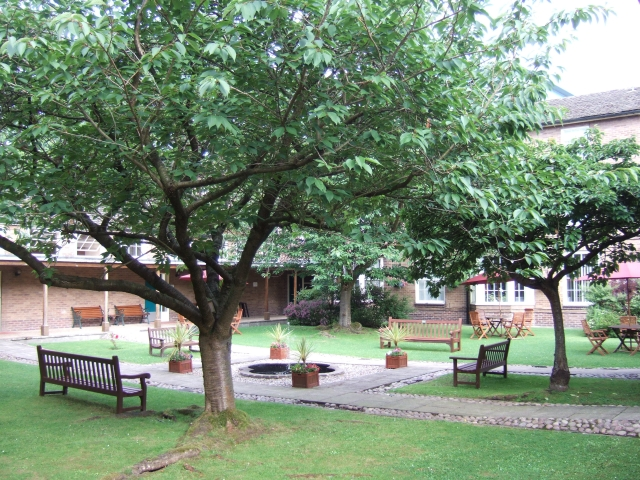
Courtyard of Luther King House

Unitarian College Manchester is one of two Unitarian seminaries in England. It is based at Luther King House in the Brighton Grove area of Manchester, and its degrees are validated by the University of Manchester.

It prepares students for ministry and lay leadership positions in the Unitarian and Non-Subscribing Presbyterian Churches.

The college provides occasional overseas scholarships for students from kindred churches, particularly from Hungary and Romania (see Unitarian Church of Transylvania). It is part of the Partnership for Theological Education.

== History ==
It was established in 1854 by the Unitarian Home Mission Board, following the move of Manchester New College to London, and subsequently to Oxford. Manchester New College, formerly "Manchester Academy", was itself based on Warrington Academy, both being dissenting academies.

== Principals ==
- John Relly Beard 1854–
- Alexander Gordon, 1890-–1911
- S. H. Mellone, 1911–1921
