= Bernard Bosanquet (philosopher) =

English philosopher and political theorist (1848–1923)

Bernard Bosanquet FBA
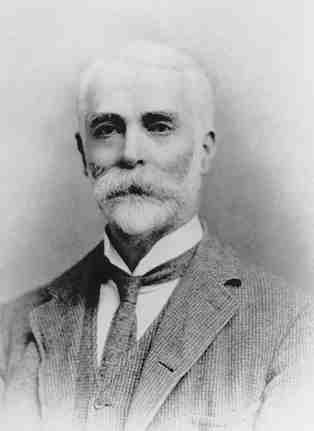
- Born: 14 June 1848; Rock Hall near Alnwick, England
- Died: 8 February 1923 (aged 74); London, England
- Spouse: Helen Dendy (m. 1895)

Education
- Education: Balliol College, Oxford
- Academic advisor: T. H. Green

Philosophical work
- Era: 20th-century philosophy
- Region: Western philosophy
- School: British idealism
- Institutions: University College, Oxford; University of St Andrews
- Main interests: Metaphysics, logic, aesthetics, political philosophy, social theory
- Notable ideas: Idealist theory of the state

Bernard Bosanquet (/ˈboʊzənˌkɛt, -kɪt/; 14 June 1848 – 8 February 1923) was an English philosopher and political theorist, and an influential figure on matters of political and social policy in the late 19th and early 20th centuries. His work influenced but was later subject to criticism by many thinkers, notably Bertrand Russell, John Dewey, William James and Ludwig Wittgenstein. Bernard was the husband of Helen Bosanquet, the leader of the Charity Organisation Society, and the brother of scientist and music theorist Robert Bosanquet and Admiral Day Bosanquet.

== Life ==
Born at Rock Hall near Alnwick, Bosanquet was the son of Robert William Bosanquet, a Church of England clergyman. He was educated at Harrow School and Balliol College, Oxford. He gained first class honours in Classical Moderations (Greek and Latin), 1868, and in Literae Humaniores (a combination of philosophy and ancient history), 1870. After graduation, he was elected to a Fellowship at University College, Oxford, but, after receiving a substantial inheritance upon the death of his father in 1880, resigned it in order to devote himself to philosophical research. He moved to London in 1881, where he became an active member of the London Ethical Society and the Charity Organisation Society. Both were positive demonstrations of Bosanquet's ethical philosophy. Bosanquet published on a wide range of topics, such as logic, metaphysics, aesthetics and political philosophy. In his metaphysics, he is regarded as a key representative (with F. H. Bradley) of absolute idealism, although it is a term that he abandoned in favour of "speculative philosophy".

He was one of the leaders of the so-called neo-Hegelian philosophical movement in Great Britain. During this time, when absolute idealism was in vogue in Britain, Bosanquet was one of the most dominant figures in British philosophy. However since the decline of that movement, he has been largely forgotten.

Bosanquet was strongly influenced by Plato and Aristotle, but also by the German philosophers Immanuel Kant and Georg Wilhelm Friedrich Hegel. Among his best-known works are The Philosophical Theory of the State (1899), his Gifford lectures, The Principle of Individuality and Value (1912) and The Value and Destiny of the Individual (1913).

Bosanquet was president of the Aristotelian Society from 1894 to 1898.

== Idealist social theory ==
In his Encyclopedia, Section 95, Hegel had written about "the ideality of the finite." This obscure, seemingly meaningless, phrase was interpreted as implying that "what is finite is not real" because the ideal is understood as being the opposite of the real. Bosanquet was a follower of Hegel and the "central theme of Bosanquet's idealism was that every finite existence necessarily transcends itself and points toward other existences and finally to the whole. Thus, he advocated a system very close to that in which Hegel had argued for the ideality of the finite."

The relation of the finite individual to the whole state in which he or she lives was investigated in Bosanquet's Philosophical Theory of the State (London, 1899). In this book, he "argued that the state is the real individual and that individual persons are unreal by comparison with it." But Bosanquet did not think that the state has a right to impose social control over its individual citizens. "On the contrary, he believed that if society is organic and individual, then its elements can cooperate apart from a centralised organ of control, the need for which presupposes that harmony has to be imposed upon something that is naturally unharmonious."

The relationship between the individual and society was summarised in Bosanquet's preface to The Introduction to Hegel's Philosophy of Fine Art (1886):

Man's Freedom, in the sense thus contemplated, lies in the spiritual or supra-sensuous world by which his humanity is realized, and in which his will finds fulfilment. The family, for example, property, and law are the first steps of man's freedom. In them the individual's will obtains and bestows recognition as an agent in a society whose bond of union is ideal – i.e. existing only in consciousness; and this recognition develops into duties and rights. It is in these that man finds something to live for, something in which and for the sake of which to assert himself. As society develops he lives on the whole more in the civilized or spiritual world, and less in the savage or purely natural world. His will, which is himself, expands with the institutions and ideas that form its purpose, and the history of this expansion is the history of human freedom. Nothing is more shallow, more barbarously irrational, than to regard the progress of civilization as the accumulation of restrictions. Laws and rules are a necessary aspect of extended capacities. (p. xxvii)

== Works ==
=== Books ===
- Athenian Constitutional History, as represented in Grote's History of Greece, critically examined by G. F. Schoemann, translated by B. Bosanquet et al. (1878)
- A History of Aesthetic (1892, second edition 1904)
- Knowledge and Reality: A Criticism of Mr. F.H. Bradley's Principles of Logic (1885)
- The Introduction to Hegel's Philosophy of Fine Art translated and edited (1886)
- Logic, or The Morphology of Knowledge in two volumes: Volume 1, Volume 2 (1888; revised edition 1911)
- The Civilization of Christendom, and Other Studies (1893)
- Essentials of Logic; Being Ten Lectures on Judgment and Inference (1895)
- Companion to Plato's Republic for English Readers, Being a Commentary Adapted to Davies and Vaughan's Translation (1895)
- Essays and Addresses (1889)
- The Philosophical Theory of the State (1899)
- Psychology of the Moral Self (1904)
- The Meaning of Teleology: A lecture read to the British Academy in 1906
- The Principle of Individuality and Value, Macmillan, 1912. (Gifford Lectures, 1910–12)
- The Value and Destiny of the Individual, Macmillan, 1923. (Gifford Lectures, 1910–12)
- The Distinction between Mind and Its Objects (1913)
- Three Lectures on Aesthetic (1915)
- Social and International Ideals: Being Studies in Patriotism (1917)
- Some Suggestions in Ethics (1919)
- Croce's Aesthetic: A lecture read to the British Academy in 1919
- Implication and Linear Inference (1920)
- What Religion Is (1920)
- The Meetings of Extremes in Contemporary Philosophy (1921)

=== Articles ===
- Review of Benno Erdmann's Logik. Bd. 1. Logische Elementarlehre (Halle: Niemeyer 1892) by Bosanquet in Mind (1892), N.S. No. 2
