= John Relly Beard =

British Unitarian minister, educator and writer

Personal life
- Born: 4 August 1800 Portsmouth, England
- Died: 22 November 1876 (aged 76) Ashton upon Mersey, Cheshire, England
- Resting place: Brooklands Cemetery, Sale, Cheshire

Religious life
- Religion: English Unitarian

Senior posting
- Teacher: Unitarian Home Missionary Board, now Unitarian College Manchester

John Relly Beard (4 August 1800 – 22 November 1876) was an English Unitarian minister, schoolmaster, university lecturer, and translator who co-founded Unitarian College Manchester and wrote more than thirty books.

== Life ==
He was born in Portsmouth on 4 August 1800, the first child of a tradesman, John Beard, and his wife Ann Paine. After attending Portsmouth Grammar School and a brief period in a French boarding-school, he joined Manchester College, York in 1820 and studied under Charles Wellbeloved, a pioneering translator of the Old Testament. One of his fellow students there was William Gaskell (whose wife Elizabeth became the famous novelist) and they remained lifelong friends. Like Gaskell, he was elected to membership of the Manchester Literary and Philosophical Society, in Beard's case on 26 January 1827

After his training Beard became a Unitarian minister at Greengate, Salford in 1825. Alongside his ministry, he ran a school which was so successful that he built a house to accommodate it. Although he closed it in 1849 to give his attention to other matters, he remained deeply interested in education. In 1842 his congregation migrated to Bridge Street, Strangeways, Manchester, and Beard remained their minister until 1864, when he moved to Sale, Cheshire.

During this time he and William Gaskell, who was living in nearby Knutsford, worked to establish the Unitarian Home Missionary Board, which became Unitarian College Manchester, of which they were the co-founders and the first two Principals.

He retired in 1874 and died aged 76 on 22 November 1876, at the Meadows, Ashton upon Mersey.

== Children ==
Beard and his wife Mary (née Barnes (1802–87)) had ten children. To mention only the best known of their descendants: their eldest son, Charles Beard (1827–88), also became a Unitarian minister, writer and educator; their youngest son, James Rait Beard (1843–1917), although engaged in business in Manchester, was active in supporting Unitarian College Manchester: he served as its Treasurer 1886–1914 and President 1900–01 and 1904–05; their eldest daughter Sarah (1831–1922) married John Dendy (1828–94) and their children included: John Dendy OBE (1852–1924); Mary Dendy, the pioneer of residential schools for mentally handicapped people; the social reformer Helen Bosanquet; and the biologist Arthur Dendy.

== Works ==
Beard published popular education manuals, theological works and, as both an editor and a journalist, engaged in vigorous Unitarian propaganda. He is best remembered for The Life of Toussaint L'Ouverture (1853) and several reference volumes on a variety of topics. He wrote in simple language and attempted to translate complicated foreign affairs—such as the Haitian struggle for independence—into terms that every reader could understand. Beard's biography of Toussaint Louverture was first published in London on the fiftieth anniversary of Toussaint L'Ouverture's death. Ten years later, in 1863, Boston publishers reissued Beard's biography, replacing a brief history of Haiti's fight for independence after L'Ouverture's exile with the first English translation of a thirty-five page autobiography written by L'Ouverture and other related documents, including a transcript of his post-mortem examination. Beard's biography remained the authoritative English-language history of L'Ouverture's life until the late twentieth century.

In explaining his reasons for writing about L'Ouverture, Beard frankly admits in the 1853 volume that he does so in order to "supply the clearest evidence that there is no insuperable barrier between the light and the dark-coloured tribes of our common human species." Throughout the text, Beard compares L'Ouverture to famously successful white generals and argues for L'Ouverture's supremacy. L'Ouverture is superior to George Washington, Beard writes, because L'Ouverture could have seized absolute power more easily than Washington, and "[t]he greater the opportunity the greater the temptation; nor can he be accounted the inferior man who overcame in the severer trial." Similarly, Beard argues that L'Ouverture is a better man than Napoleon Bonaparte because "the two differed in that which is the dividing line between the happy and the wretched; for while, with Bonaparte, God was a name, with Toussaint L'Ouverture, God was at once the sole reality and the sovereign good." For Beard, L'Ouverture's ultimate failure to liberate Haiti and his untimely death are the product of unfortunate circumstances—not an indictment of his character or leadership abilities.
