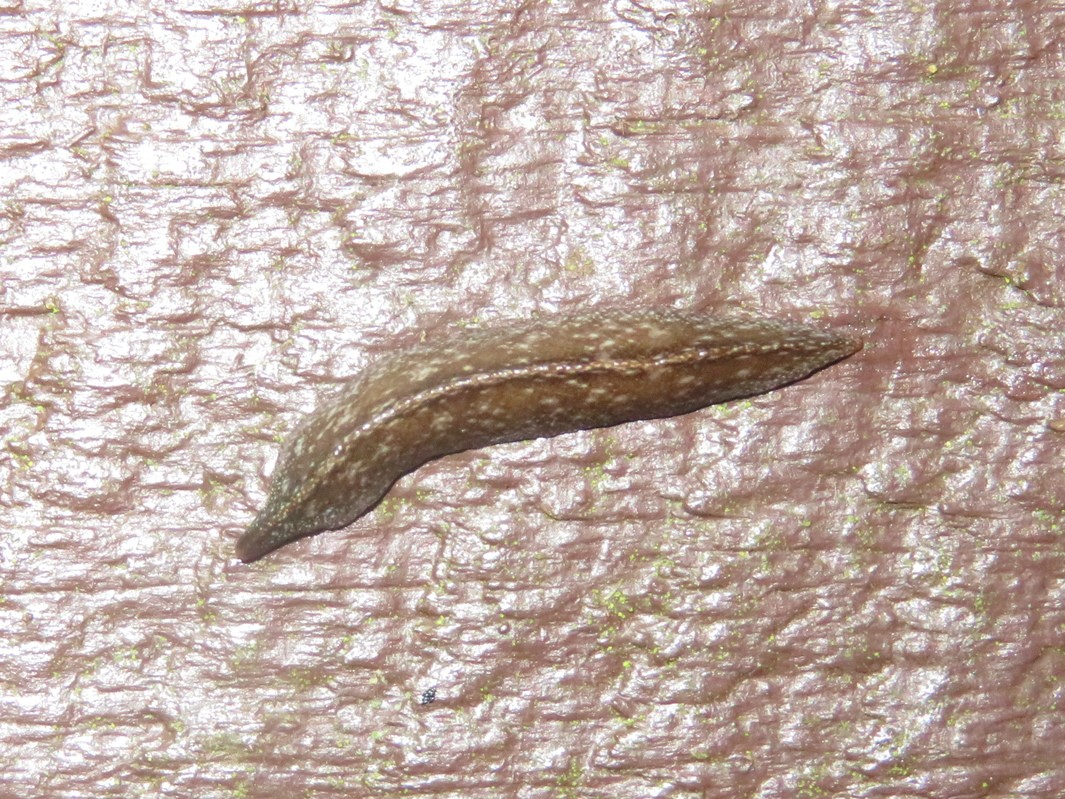
- Australopacifica laingii

Scientific classification
- Kingdom: Animalia
- Phylum: Platyhelminthes
- Order: Tricladida
- Family: Geoplanidae
- Tribe: Caenoplanini
- Genus: Australopacifica; Ogren & Kawakatsu, 1991

= Australopacifica =

Genus of flatworms

Australopacifica is a genus of land planarians of the tribe Caenoplanini. It was erected to include species lacking sufficient morphological information to allow them to be classified in the appropriate genus.

Australopacifica atrata (Steel, 1897), a species originally described from New South Wales, Australia has invaded the United Kingdom since 2015. Its complete mitogenome was described in 2022, and found to be similar to that of other Rhynchodeminae.

== Taxonomy ==
Many species of land planarians described during the second half of the 19th century and the first half of the 20th century were classified based solely on external characteristics. Currently, the land planarian genera are highly based on internal anatomy, especially the anatomy of the copulatory apparatus. As a result, species with old descriptions that were never redescribed, so that their internal anatomy remains unknown, cannot be assigned to the correct genus. Thus, the genus Australopacifica was erected to temporarily accommodate species of the tribe Caenoplanini, whose anatomy of the copulatory apparatus is still unknown.

== Species ==
The genus Australopacifica currently contains the following species:

- Australopacifica albolineata (Steel, 1897)
- Australopacifica alfordensis (Dendy, 1896)
- Australopacifica antarctica (Dendy, 1909)
- Australopacifica atrata (Steel, 1897)
- Australopacifica aucklandica (Dendy, 1901)
- Australopacifica aurantia (Whitehouse, 1914)
- Australopacifica austiniana (Schröder, 1924)
- Australopacifica blomefieldi (Graff, 1899)
- Australopacifica buettneri (Graff, 1899)
- Australopacifica castanea (Graff, 1899)
- Australopacifica challengeri (Graff, 1899)
- Australopacifica chamissoniana (Schröder, 1924)
- Australopacifica cooperi (Dendy, 1901)
- Australopacifica cucullata (Dendy, 1896)
- Australopacifica dendyi (Spencer, 1891)
- Australopacifica dietrichiana (Schröder, 1924)
- Australopacifica eschscholtziana (Schröder, 1924)
- Australopacifica fagicola (Dendy, 1901)
- Australopacifica flavimarginata (Dendy, 1896)
- Australopacifica gamblei (Graff, 1898)
- Australopacifica gelatinosa (Dendy, 1894)
- Australopacifica graminicola (Steel, 1900)
- Australopacifica greeni (Graff, 1899)
- Australopacifica gregoryana (Schröder, 1924)
- Australopacifica grubei (Graff, 1899)
- Australopacifica guentheri (Graff, 1899)
- Australopacifica hamiltoni (Dendy, 1894)
- Australopacifica himalayensis (Whitehouse, 1919)
- Australopacifica hoggii (Dendy, 1891)
- Australopacifica howitti (Dendy, 1891)
- Australopacifica humberti (Graff, 1899)
- Australopacifica huttoni (Graff, 1899)
- Australopacifica ijimai (Graff, 1899)
- Australopacifica inflata (Graff, 1899)
- Australopacifica iris (Dendy, 1896)
- Australopacifica jacksoniana (Dendy, 1896)
- Australopacifica korotneffi (Graff, 1899)
- Australopacifica kotzebueana (Schröder, 1924)
- Australopacifica krausi (Graff, 1899)
- Australopacifica laingii (Dendy, 1894)
- Australopacifica lapidicola (Stimpson, 1857)
- Australopacifica lateropunctata (Dendy, 1901)
- Australopacifica leichhardtiana (Schröder, 1924)
- Australopacifica leuckarti (Graff, 1899)
- Australopacifica lucasi (Dendy, 1891)
- Australopacifica maculosa (Whitehouse, 1919)
- Australopacifica martensi (Graff, 1899)
- Australopacifica meridionalis (Graff, 1899)
- Australopacifica metschnikoffi (Graff, 1899)
- Australopacifica moebiusi (Graff, 1899)
- Australopacifica mortoni (Dendy, 1894)
- Australopacifica muelleriana (Schröder, 1924)
- Australopacifica nichollsi (Dendy, 1915)
- Australopacifica parva (Steel, 1897)
- Australopacifica pulverulenta (Graff, 1899)
- Australopacifica regina (Dendy, 1892)
- Australopacifica robusta (Steel, 1897)
- Australopacifica rotunda (Whitehouse, 1919)
- Australopacifica rouxiana (Schröder, 1924)
- Australopacifica sarasiniana (Schröder, 1924)
- Australopacifica scaphoidea (Steel, 1900)
- Australopacifica semoniana (Schröder, 1924)
- Australopacifica sowerbyi (Graff, 1899)
- Australopacifica spectabilis (Dendy, 1894)
- Australopacifica splendens (Dendy, 1894)
- Australopacifica striata (Whitehouse, 1919)
- Australopacifica subpallida (Hyman, 1939)
- Australopacifica subviridis (Moseley, 1877)
- Australopacifica treubi (Graff, 1899)
- Australopacifica trifasciata (Steel, 1897)
- Australopacifica walhallae (Dendy, 1891)
- Australopacifica warragulensis (Graff, 1899)
- Australopacifica willeyi (Busson, 1903)
- Australopacifica zebra (Schröder, 1924)
