= Warford Hall =

Country house in Great Warford, Cheshire, United Kingdom

Coordinates: 53°17′13″N 2°16′34″W

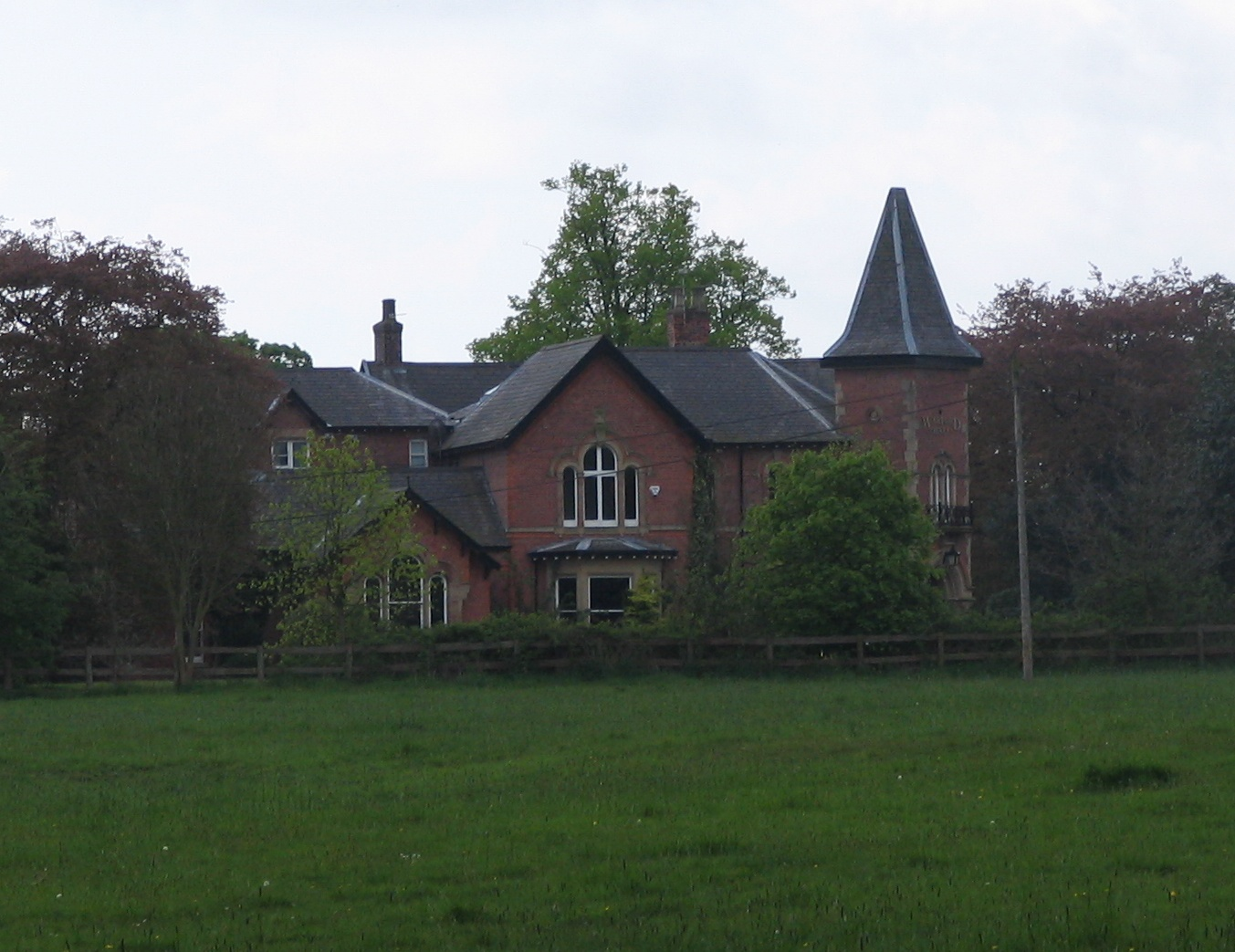
Warford Hall in 2005

Warford Hall is a country house in the village of Great Warford, Cheshire, England. It was designed by W. Roberts, and built in 1867 for J. C. Rowley. It is a large house in the Italianate style, constructed of red brick and Alderley Edge stone. On its front is a tower porch set on the skew.

The house serves as the residence of former footballer Ashley Ward and his wife, Dawn Ward, who appeared on The Real Housewives of Cheshire, a reality television series. The Wards have been seeking to develop the property, and they submitted plans in July 2021 to convert some outbuildings into six dwelling units.
