= Minority Report (Poor Law) =

Published by the UK Royal Commission on the Poor Laws and Relief of Distress 1905–09

The Minority Report was one of two reports published by the Royal Commission on the Poor Laws and Relief of Distress 1905–1909, the other being Majority Report. Headed by the Fabian socialist Beatrice Webb, it called for a system that was radically different from the existing Poor Law. She, amongst the others heading the report, who included George Lansbury, felt that it was shortsighted of society to expect paupers to be entirely accountable for themselves.

== Contribution of Sidney and Beatrice Webb ==
The Minority Report to the commission was among the most famous of the Webbs' outputs. (Sidney Webb was not a member of the commission, but the Minority Report was a co-production). Beatrice Webb wrote that its purpose was "to secure a national minimum of civilised life ... open to all alike, of both sexes and all classes, by which we meant sufficient nourishment and training when young, a living wage when able-bodied, treatment when sick, and modest but secure livelihood when disabled or aged".

Historian Jose Harris, the biographer of William Beveridge, has written that "in historical accounts of modern social policy, the Royal Commission – and in particular its famous Minority Report – has often been closely twinned with the Beveridge Plan of 1942 as one of the two most seminal public enquiries into the working of British social policy over the last hundred years", noting that the Minority Report has often been cited as one of the first descriptions of a modern welfare state. William Beveridge worked as a researcher for the Webbs on the Minority Report, on the issue of employment exchanges and was to write in his memoirs that "the Beveridge Report stemmed from what all of us had imbibed from the Webbs".

== Arguments compared with the Majority Report ==
The central arguments between Helen Bosanquet of the Charity Organisation Society and Beatrice Webb – who led the intellectual arguments for majority and minority respectively – have resonated across later debates about poverty and welfare. Webb called for a structural understanding of the causes of poverty – against were a majority but not a clear majority (absolute majority) who feared that this would underplay individual responsibility – and she argued that collective responsibility to prevent poverty required a much greater public role for the state in guaranteeing a basic minimum, while Bosanquet argued that charity-led provision would be undermined by the state.

A Guardian editorial in 2009, marking the centenary of the Minority Report, wrote that "the seed that was to grow into the welfare state was planted [in the Minority Report] ... Workhouses lingered on in various forms and the poor law itself lasted until 1948 – but Beatrice had already written its obituary in 1909".

== Legislative effects ==
These arguments were not successful in 1909. The divisions on the Commission saw the Liberal government ignore recommendations for reform from majority and minority. The Webbs sold 25,000 copies of a Fabian Society edition of the Minority Report.

== Political effects ==
Politically, the experience of the Minority Report campaign proved important in moving the Webbs and other Fabians away from influencing the Liberal Party to focusing on building up the Labour Party. The fledgling parliamentary Labour Party proposed in a private members bill measures based on the Minority Report: few Liberals supported its measures, with Winston Churchill a prominent exception. The Webbs launched a campaign for the break-up of the Poor Law to mobilise public support. The campaign letter 'The Crusade' was a forerunner to the New Statesman, both edited by Clifford Sharp.
