= Bryn Celyn =

Coordinates: 53.294248°N 4.093106°W

- Location within Anglesey
- OS grid reference: SH 6059 7952
  - Cardiff: 131.2 mi (211.1 km)
  - London: 207.8 mi (334.4 km)
- Community: Llangoed
- Principal area: Anglesey
- Country: Wales
- Sovereign state: United Kingdom
- Post town: Beaumaris
- Police: North Wales
- Fire: North Wales
- Ambulance: Welsh
- UK Parliament: Ynys Môn
- Senedd Cymru – Welsh Parliament: Ynys Môn

Bryn Celyn is an area in the community of Llangoed, Anglesey, Wales, which is 131.2 miles (211.1 km) from Cardiff and 207.8 miles (334.4 km) from London.

== Notable people ==
- Mary Dendy (1855–1933) a promoter of residential schools for mentally handicapped people, i.e. institutionalisation.

== See also ==
- List of localities in Wales by population
