= Royal Commission on the Poor Laws and Relief of Distress 1905–1909 =

Body set up by the British Parliament

The Royal Commission on the Poor Laws and Relief of Distress 1905–1909 was a body set up by the British Parliament in order to investigate how the Poor Law system should be changed. The commission included Poor Law Guardians, members of the Charity Organisation Society, members of local government boards as well as the social researchers Charles Booth and Beatrice Webb.

The Commission spent four years investigating and eventually produced two conflicting reports known as the Majority Report and the Minority Report. As the basis of the two reports was in such contrast the Liberal Party were able to ignore both when implementing their Liberal reforms package.

The commission was set up by an outgoing Conservative government and was chaired by Lord George Hamilton. The scale of the enquiry was considerable with huge volumes of documentary evidence collected. Although the two reports produced came from opposing political ideologies, there was some common ground between them: namely, a consensus that the Poor Law should not continue in its current form, a desire to standardise provision, and a recognition of structural failure as an element of the problem of involuntary poverty.

== See also ==
- Minority report (Poor Law)
- Majority report (Poor Law)
