= Minority Report (disambiguation) =

Minority Report is a 2002 film loosely adapted from Philip K. Dick's short story "The Minority Report".

Minority Report or The Minority Report may also refer to:

- Minority Report (Poor Law), published by the UK Royal Commission on the Poor Laws and Relief of Distress 1905–09
- "Minority Report", a 1949 science fiction short story by Theodore Sturgeon
- "The Minority Report", a 1956 science fiction short story by Philip K. Dick
  - The Minority Report (1991 collection), a 1991 collection of stories by Philip K. Dick
  - Minority Report (2002 collection), a 2002 collection of stories by Philip K. Dick
  - Minority Report (TV series), a 2015 American television series on Fox that serves as a sequel adaptation of the novel and 2002 film
  - Minority Report: Everybody Runs, a 2002 video game based on the film
- Minority Report, a 1956 book by H. L. Mencken
- "Minority Report", a 2006 single by Jay-Z from the album Kingdom Come
- The Minority Report with Larry Wilmore, the working title of the Comedy Central late night talk show The Nightly Show with Larry Wilmore

== See also ==
- Dissenting opinion
