= Thomas B. Steel =

American computer scientist (1929–2014)

Thomas Brevard Steel Jr. (February 2, 1929 – August 13, 2014) was an American computer scientist.

== Life and career ==
His parents were Thomas Brevard Steel and Maudelle Vinson. The elder Steel studied classics at the University of Texas. After graduating in 1915, he served in the United States Army during World War I, and through 1923. Steel Sr. enrolled at the University of California, Berkeley in 1924, then served the University of California system as assistant recorder starting in 1926. Steel Sr. succeeded James Sutton in the position in 1929. The role was re-titled registrar and secretary of the senate in 1933. After the United States entered World War II, Steel Sr. was recruited to complete classified duties for the United States Navy. In 1944, he returned to the University of California as registrar and senate secretary. Steel Sr. formally split the roles into two job titles in 1955, and remained as secretary until his retirement in 1959.

Steel was born on February 2, 1929, three years after his parents married. He was a founding member of the SHARE users' group. Steel Jr. was also associated with the American Federation of Information Processing Societies, and served as its representative to a number of the International Federation for Information Processing's technical subcommittees and subgroups. He was active in the Association for Computing Machinery and specialized in the enforcement of standards. Steel Jr. was awarded the ACM's Distinguished Service Award in 1977, and named an ACM fellow in 1994. He lived in New York City and worked for the American Telephone and Telegraph Company, then headquartered at Basking Ridge, New Jersey, as an international standards representative.

Steel died on August 13, 2014, at the age of 85.

== Selected publications ==
- Belnap, Nuel D.; Steel Jr., Thomas B. (1976). The Logic of Questions and Answers. Yale University Press. ISBN 978-0-300-01962-9.
