= Majority Report (Poor Law) =

1909 report by the Royal Commission on the Poor Laws

The Majority Report by the Royal Commission on the Poor Laws was published in 1909. The commission was set up by the Conservative government of Arthur Balfour to review whether the Poor Law Amendment Act 1834 should be modified or changed in the way it was administered, or if new legislation should be introduced, to deal with poverty and unemployment.

This Royal Commission published two reports: a Majority Report and a Minority Report. The vocal 'majority' of the twenty-member commission opposed state assistance for the 'undeserving poor', because it would make them more dependent. The majority was led by the chairman and former Conservative government minister Lord George Hamilton. Supporting his position were heads of the local government boards, as well as representatives of the Charity Organisation Society such as Helen Bosanquet and Octavia Hill, who believed that poor people could be 'reformed' and that charities should lead in providing relief from hardship.

== Findings of the report ==
- The origins of poverty were moral factors
- The Poor Law should remain
- Boards of Guardians provided too much outdoor relief
- Able-bodied poor were not deterred from seeking relief because of mixed workhouses.
