= Arthur Dendy =

English zoologist

Arthur Dendy, photographed by Walter Stoneman in 1917

Arthur Dendy (20 January 1865, in Manchester – 24 March 1925, in London) was an English zoologist known for his work on marine sponges and the terrestrial invertebrates of Victoria, Australia, notably including the "living fossil" Peripatus. He was in turn professor of zoology in New Zealand, in South Africa and finally at King's College London. He was a Fellow of the Royal Society.

== Family life ==
Dendy's parents were John Dendy, a silk fabric maker of Manchester, and Sarah Beard, daughter of John Relly Beard. His sisters included Mary Dendy and Helen Bosanquet. He married Ada Margaret Courtauld on 5 December 1888. They had four children, three daughters—including the artist Vera Ellen Poole (1890–1965)—and one son.

== Career ==
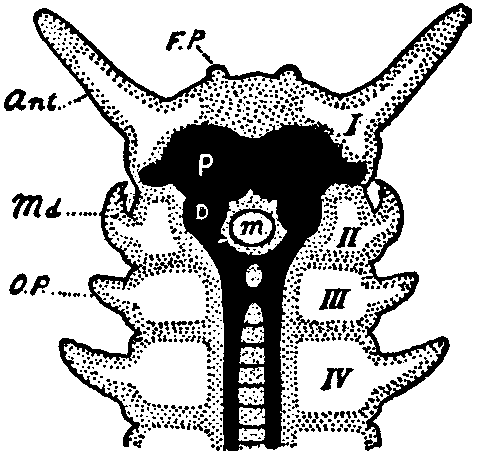
Tentacled head of Peripatus, a member of the "living fossil" phylum Onychophora

He was educated in zoology at Owens College, Manchester, gaining his M.Sc. in 1887 and his D.Sc. in 1891. He worked on part of the report of the Challenger expedition (1872–1876), describing monaxonid sponges. In 1888 he moved to the University of Melbourne as demonstrator and assistant lecturer. There he identified and described almost 2000 specimens of sponges from the sea near Port Phillip Heads. This work led to ten scientific papers on Australian sponges; he described 87 new species of sponge. Eventually Dendy became a leading authority on the sponge phylum, (Porifera), which he extensively restructured.

Dendy was the first zoologist to study the terrestrial invertebrates of Victoria, Australia. This work led to 16 scientific papers and 79 new species. These included terrestrial flatworms (planarians) and nemerteans, but the most famous of his animals was the so-called "living fossil" Peripatus.

In 1893, Dendy became professor of biology at Canterbury College, Christchurch, New Zealand. While in New Zealand, Dendy coined the term "cryptozoic fauna" to refer to animals which live in environments like leaf litter, under rocks, and so on.

In 1903, he became professor of biology at the University of Cape Town, South Africa. In 1905, he became professor of zoology at King's College, London.

Dendy was an "extreme" Lamarckian, contributing to the eclipse of Darwinism in the late 19th century.

== Honours and distinctions ==
Dendy contributed articles including "Sponges" to the 1911 Encyclopædia Britannica under the initials "A. DE."

He served as president of the Quekett Microscopical Club from 1912 to 1916.

His name is honoured in the genus name Arthurdendyus Jones, 1999; Arthurdendyus triangulatus is the New Zealand flatworm, an invasive species in the United Kingdom.

His name is honoured in the genus name Dendya Bidder, 1898, a genus of Calcarea (Porifera). Still in this group of Porifera, the genus name Arturia Azevedo, Padua, Moraes, Rossi, Muricy & Klautau, 2017 was also named in his honour.

== Works ==
- Dendy, Arthur, and Ridley, Stuart O. (1886) On Proteleia sollasi, a new genus and species of monaxonid sponges allied to Polymastia. Annals and Magazine of Natural History (5) 18: 152–159.

== Bibliography ==
- Australian Dictionary of Biography: Dendy, Arthur (1865–1925)
- Cyclopedia of New Zealand: Professor Arthur Dendy
- "Obituary: Prof. A. Dendy, F.R.S." Nature. 115: 540–541. 11 April 1925. doi:10.1038/115540a0.
- "DENDY, Professor Arthur". Who's Who. Vol. 59. 1907. p. 469.
