= Charity Organisation Society =

Founded in England in 1869

The Charity Organisation Societies (COS) were poverty relief organizations founded first in London, England on April 22, 1869. The society was an organized response to increased poverty that resulted from urbanization and the loss of smaller communal support networks in industrial Europe. The COS sought to use a scientific approach to relief management, utilizing a team of investigators and supervisors to understand the specifics of poverty in their area. The COS has been identified as a forerunner of the modern field of social work.

The society was mainly concerned with distinction between the deserving poor and undeserving poor. The society believed that giving out charity without investigating the problems behind poverty created a class of citizens that would always be dependent on alms giving.

The COS was inspired by the so-called Elberfeld system, an organized form of relief work in Elberfeld, Germany. The system divided up the city into smaller units, and assigned 'visitors' (unpaid workers from higher social classes) to a certain number of impoverished houses. The purpose was to "administer relief intelligently, through an intimate knowledge of the poor person's life.

The conviction that relief promoted dependency was the basis for forming the Societies. Instead of offering direct relief, the societies addressed the cycle of poverty. Neighborhood charity visitors taught the values of hard work and thrift to individuals and families. The COS set up centralised records and administrative services and emphasised objective investigations and professional training. There was a strong scientific emphasis as the charity visitors organised their activities and learned principles of practice and techniques of intervention from one another. The result led to the origin of social casework. Gradually, over the ensuing years, volunteer visitors began to be supplanted by paid staff.

== Operations ==
Charity Organisation Societies were made up of charitable groups that used scientific philanthropy to help poor, distressed or deviant persons. The Societies considered themselves more than just alms givers. Their ultimate goal was to restore as much self-sufficiency and responsibility as an individual could manage. Through their activities, the Societies tended to be aware of the range of social services available in their communities. They thus became the primary source of information and referral for all services. Through these referrals, a Society often became the central agency in the social services of its community. For instance, the Charity Organization Society of Denver, Colorado, the forerunner of the modern United Way of America, coordinated the charitable activities of local Jewish, Congregational and Catholic groups. Its work under the leadership of Frances Wisebart Jacobs ranged from work with tuberculosis patients to the care and education of young children and was funded in part by direct assistance from the city itself.

The Charity Organization Society can be contrasted to the settlement house movement which emphasised social reform rather than personal problems as the proper focus of charity.

== Efficacy and criticism ==
Despite its claims that private charity would be superior to public welfare because it improved the moral character of the recipients, records from the COS' Indianapolis branch show that only a minority of its relief recipients managed to become self-reliant, with the exit rate declining sharply the longer people were on relief. The exit rates are similar to those in late-20th-century public welfare programs, despite the fact that COS only granted relief only to recipients it deemed worthy and improvable. Furthermore, journals kept by the COS case workers and "friendly visitors" indicate that they were not on friendly terms with the relief recipients but described them in disparaging terms and interacted with them in an intrusive and presumptuous way.

The COS was resented by the poor for its harshness, and its acronym was rendered by critics as "Cringe or Starve".

== Legacy in Britain ==
In Britain, the Charity Organisation Society was led by Helen Bosanquet and Octavia Hill, and supported the concept of self-help and limited government intervention to deal with the effects of poverty. Alsager Hay Hill was prominent from its foundation, acting as honorary secretary of the council until July 1870, and as an active member of the council until 1880:

The organisation claimed to use "scientific principles to root out scroungers and target relief where it was most needed". The social researcher, educator and suffragist, Christina Violet Butler, was another prominent member of the organisation and refers to her involvement in two interviews with the historian, Brian Harrison, in September and November 1974, conducted as part of the Suffrage Interviews project, titled Oral evidence on the suffragette and suffragist movements: the Brian Harrison interviews. Annie Barnes, also interviewed by Harrison, joined the organisation and used her own background that people objected to accepting "Charity". The Charity Organisation Society was renamed Family Welfare Association in 1946 and still operates today as Family Action, a registered family support charity.

== See also ==
- Scientific Charity Movement
