= Canadian Theological Society =

Learned society

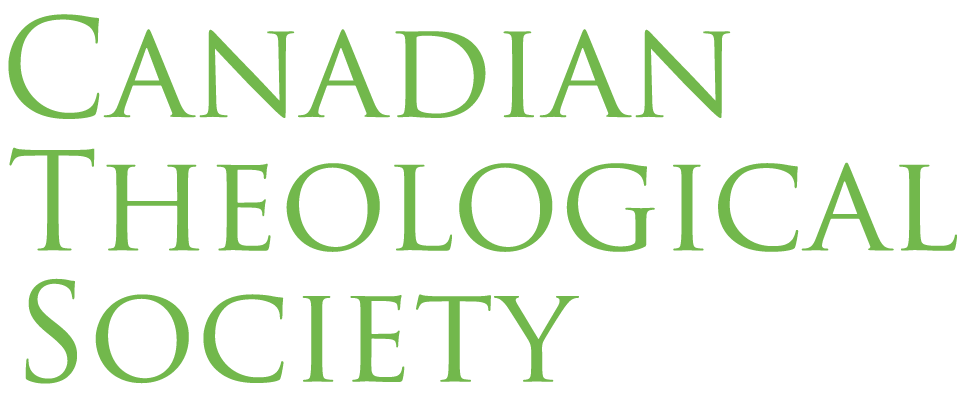
- Abbreviation: CTS
- Formation: 1955; 71 years ago
- Type: Learned society
- Location: Canada
- Field: Theology
- Official languages: English
- Affiliations: Canadian Corporation for Studies in Religion; Canadian Federation for the Humanities and Social Sciences
- Website: cts-stc.ca

The Canadian Theological Society (CTS) is a learned society founded in 1955 to promote the study of theology. The society is a founding member of the Canadian Corporation for Studies in Religion (CCSR) and the Canadian Federation for the Humanities and Social Sciences (CFHSS).

As a member of the CCSR, the Canadian Theological Society sponsors Studies in Religion/Sciences Religieuses, a bilingual journal that addresses a wide range of topics in religious studies and theology. It also supports and contributes to the book series published by the CCSR.

The society meets annually at the Canadian Congress of Humanities and Social Sciences, which is sponsored by the CFHSS.

== Presidents ==
- 1955–1957: James S. Thomson
- 1957–1958: Eugene Fairweather
- 1958–1959: David Hay
- 1959–1960: Alistair McKinnon
- 1960–1961: Russell Aldwinckle
- 1961–1962: David Hay
- 1962–1963: William Fennell
- 1963–1964: Joseph McLelland
- 1964–1965: Eric Jay
- 1965–1966: George Johnston
- 1966–1967: Gregory Baum
- 1967–1968: Ronald Reeve
- 1968–1969: John Hoffman
- 1969–1970: David Demson
- 1970–1971: Walter Principe
- 1971–1972: Kenneth Hamilton
- 1972–1973: Martin Rumscheidt
- 1973–1974: David Lochhead
- 1974–1975: Frederick Crowe
- 1975–1976: Arne Siirala
- 1976–1977: Dale Stover
- 1977–1978: Charles Paris
- 1978–1979: Norman King
- 1979–1980: Wilfred Cantwell Smith
- 1980–1981: Joanne McWilliam Dewart
- 1981–1982: Kenneth Hamilton
- 1982–1983: Donald Evans
- 1983–1984: Mac Watts
- 1984–1985: Donna Geernaert
- 1985–1986: Abrahim Khan
- 1986–1987: Elizabeth Bellefontaine
- 1987–1988: Ray Whitehead
- 1988–1989: James Horne
- 1989–1990: Ellen Leonard
- 1990–1991: Jay Newman
- 1991–1992: Pamela Dickey Young
- 1992–1993: James Olthuis
- 1993–1994: Peter Slater
- 1994–1995: Doris Dyke
- 1995–1996: Mary Schaefer
- 1996–1997: Marilyn Legge
- 1997–1998: Harold Wells
- 1998–1999: George Schner
- 1999–2000: Anne Marie Dalton
- 2000–2001: Douglas Harink
- 2001–2002: Cynthia Crysdale
- 2002–2003: Eric Beresford
- 2003–2004: Brenda Appleby
- 2004–2005: Don Schweitzer
- 2005–2006: Heather Eaton
- 2006–2007: John Franklin
- 2007–2008: Loraine MacKenzie Shepherd
- 2008–2009: Michael Bourgeois
- 2009–2010: Alyda Faber
- 2010–2011: Lee Cormie
- 2011–2012: Kathleen Skerrett
- 2012–2013: Doris Kieser
- 2013–2014: Allen Jorgenson
- 2014–2015: Robert Fennell
- 2015–2016: Cristina Vanin
- 2016–2017: Jeremy Bergen
- 2017–2018: Timothy Harvie
- 2018–2019: Catherine MacLean
- 2019–2021: William Sweet
- 2021–2022: Jane Barter
- 2022–2023: Darren Dias

== See also ==
- Canadian Society for the Study of Religion
- Society of Biblical Literature
