= List of Canadian philosophers =

This page lists philosophers from Canada.

== List ==
- Leslie Armour (1931–2014), Research Professor of Philosophy at Dominican University College, and Emeritus Professor of Philosophy at the University of Ottawa
- Vernon J. Bourke (1907–1988), Professor of Philosophy at Saint Louis University
- James Robert Brown, Professor of Philosophy at the University of Toronto
- Mario Bunge (1919–2020), Frothingham Professor of Logics and Metaphysics at McGill University
- David Castle (born 1967), Professor and Chair of Innovations in the Life Sciences at the University of Edinburgh
- Jacques M. Chevalier (born 1949), Chancellor's Professor Emeritus at Carleton University
- Patricia Churchland (born 1943), UC President's Professor of Philosophy at the University of California, San Diego, adjunct professor at the Salk Institute for Biological Studies
- Paul Churchland (born 1942), Professor Emeritus at the University of California, San Diego
- Murray Clarke, Professor of Philosophy at Concordia University
- Sharyn Clough (born 1965), Associate Professor of Philosophy at Oregon State University
- Charles Norris Cochrane (1889–1945)
- Lorraine Code (born 1937), Professor Emerita of Philosophy at York University
- G.A. Cohen (1941–2009), Chichele Professor of Social and Political Theory, All Souls College, Oxford
- Joseph Cohen (born 1971 in Montreal), professor of contemporary continental philosophy at the University College Dublin
- Vianney Décarie (1917–2009), Order of Canada, National Order of Quebec
- John N. Deck (1921–1979), Professor of Philosophy at the University of Windsor
- Ronald de Sousa, Emeritus Professor at the Department of Philosophy of the University of Toronto
- James Doull (1918–2001), professor at Dalhousie University
- Richard Fumerton (born 1949), Professor of Philosophy at the University of Iowa
- David Gauthier (1932–2023), Professor Emeritus at the University of Pittsburgh
- George Grant (1918–1988), Order of Canada
- Dan Goldstick, Professor Emeritus at the University of Toronto
- Thomas Anderson Gouge (1910–1999)
- Ian Hacking (1936–2023), Professor Emeritus at the University of Toronto, Order of Canada
- Cressida Heyes, Professor of Philosophy and Canada Research Chair at the University of Alberta.
- Ted Honderich (1933–2024), Grote Professor Emeritus of the Philosophy of Mind and Logic, University College London and Visiting Professor at the University of Bath
- Andrew David Irvine (born 1958), Professor of Philosophy and Mathematics at the University of British Columbia
- Grace Jantzen (1948–2006), Professor of Religion, Culture and Gender at Manchester University
- Mark Kingwell (born 1963), Professor of Philosophy at the University of Toronto
- Raymond Klibansky (1905–2005), Order of Canada, National Order of Quebec, John Frothingham Emeritus Professor of Logic and Metaphysics at McGill University, honorary fellow of Wolfson College, Oxford
- Will Kymlicka, Professor of Philosophy at Queen's University
- Bernard Lonergan (1904–1984), Professor of Philosophy
- Lou Marinoff (born 1951), associate professor at the City College of New York
- Adèle Mercier, Professor of Philosophy at Queen's University
- Adam Morton (1945–2020), Professor Emeritus, University of Alberta, visiting emeritus professor, UBC
- Jennifer Nagel, Professor of Philosophy at the University of Toronto.
- Jan Narveson, Distinguished Professor Emeritus, University of Waterloo
- Kai Nielsen (1926–2021), adjunct professor at Concordia University and Professor Emeritus at the University of Calgary
- Jay Newman (1948–2007), professor at the University of Guelph
- Calvin Normore (born 1948), Macdonald Chair of Moral Philosophy at McGill University and Professor of Philosophy at UCLA
- Joseph Owens, C.Ss.R., (1908–2005) Pontifical Institute of Mediaeval Studies
- John Ralston Saul (born 1947), Order of Canada
- Duane Rousselle (born 1982), Assistant Professor of Sociology at Nipissing University
- John Russon, Presidential Distinguished Professor at the University of Guelph
- David Schmidtz, Professor of Philosophy and Economics at the University of Arizona
- William Seager (born 1952), Professor of Philosophy at the University of Toronto Scarborough
- Michel Seymour, Professor of Philosophy at Université de Montréal
- Hillel Steiner, Emeritus Professor of Political Philosophy at the University of Manchester
- Barry Stroud (1935–2019), Willis S. and Marion Slusser Professor Emeritus of Philosophy at the University of California, Berkeley
- L. W. Sumner (born 1941), Professor Emeritus of Law and Philosophy at the University of Toronto
- William Sweet, Professor of Philosophy at St. Francis Xavier University
- Charles Taylor (born 1931), Professor Emeritus at McGill University
- John Watson (1847–1939), Chair of Logic, Metaphysics, and Ethics at Queen's University
- Alison Wylie, Professor of Philosophy at the University of British Columbia

== See also ==
- Philosophy in Canada
- Lists of Canadian writers
