= Philosophy in Canada =

The study and teaching of philosophy in Canada date from the time of New France. Generally, Canadian philosophers have not developed unique forms of philosophical thought; rather, Canadian philosophers have reflected particular views of established European and later American schools of philosophical thought, be it Thomism, Objective Idealism, or Scottish Common Sense Realism. Since the mid-twentieth century the depth and scope of philosophical activity in Canada has increased dramatically. This article focuses on the evolution of epistemology, logic, the philosophy of mind, metaphysics, ethics and metaethics, and continental philosophy in Canada.

== 1700s-1900s ==
=== The Roman Catholic Church and philosophy ===
The Roman Catholic Church, one of the founding institutions of New France, had a profound influence on philosophy in Canada. As early as 1665, philosophy, viewed as the handmaiden of theology, was taught in Quebec at the Jesuit College there and included studies in physics, metaphysics and ethics as well as the works of St. Thomas Aquinas (1224–1274). The Enlightenment, and the arrival of the British after 1759, introduced new ideas into New France, including Cartesian doubt, the atheism of the Enlightenment, and the sovereignty of the polity. A reaction to these ideas ensued, inspired by the French philosopher, Felicite de Lamennais (1782–1854) and was reflected in the works of the colonial philosopher Abbé Jérôme Demers. This reaction initially took the form of an objection to, and refutation of these "unsettling" ideas, adopted by other thinkers, such as Pierre du Calvet. After 1840, in Europe as well as New France, the reaction of the Catholic Church to the ideas of the Enlightenment took the form of stronger response which sought to reaffirm the Catholic view and establish a "Catholic" philosophy that removed secular uncertainty by reinforcing the place of God at the centre of daily life. This new philosophy took the form of Thomism, which in many ways is considered the "French Canadian" philosophy.

In the 1920s the study of philosophy was taken up by universities in Quebec, including the University de Montréal in 1921 and Laval University in Quebec in 1935. This development was both inspired by and coincident with the publication in 1931 of the papal pronouncement, Deus Scientarium, which sought to mobilize science as the basis of faith. The new century was also marked by notable contributions to the study of medieval history and philosophy by Father Ephrem Longpres, the Franciscan medievalist and the Dominican philosophers, including Hermas Bastien, Charles De Koninck, Father Louis Lachance, Father Arcade Monette, Father Julien Péghaire, Father Louis-Marie Regis, and Father Patrice Robert.

=== English Canada ===
In English-speaking Canada, philosophical study was the exclusive domain of the colleges and universities of English speaking British North America and later Canada. Colleges founded during the colonial regime included Dalhousie University in Halifax, Nova Scotia in 1818, McGill University in Montreal in 1821, the University of Toronto in 1827, Queens University in Kingston, Ontario in 1841 and the University of Ottawa in 1848. The latter part of the nineteenth century witnessed the founding of the University of Manitoba in Winnipeg in 1877, l´Université de Montréal and the University of Western Ontario in London, Ontario in 1878 and McMaster University in Hamilton, Ontario in 1887. The University of Alberta in Edmonton and the University of British Columbia in Vancouver, British Columbia, were both established in 1908. All provided courses in philosophy.

The Protestant Reformation inspired the first philosophers in English speaking Canada. These scholars all taught at newly created colonial universities, and their studies emphasized the philosophical foundation of religion, in this case Protestantism, the philosophical understanding of the natural world (natural philosophy), and the philosophical basis of political systems. James Beaven's Elements of Natural Theology, which was perhaps the first philosophical work written in English Canada, is an early example.

Other notable contributors to these ideas included John Watson at Queen's University in Kingston and George John Blewett at the University of Toronto. Other philosophers included Richard Maurice Bucke of London, Ontario, John Macdonald at the University of Alberta, Herbert Leslie Stewart at Dalhousie University in Halifax, Rupert Clendon Lodge at the University of Manitoba, and George Sidney Brett and John Irving at the University of Toronto. Many of these figures were influenced by the British idealist tradition, represented by figures such as Bernard Bosanquet and Thomas Hill Green dominant in Britain in the late 19th and early 20th centuries.

Of particular note during middle years of the twentieth century was the work of one of Canada's greatest scholars, Harold Innis, of the University of Toronto. Although usually considered an economist and social scientist, his work also reflects an important number of philosophical concepts related to economics and communications. He had a great influence on his colleague Marshall McLuhan.

=== New disciplines ===
The growth and specialization of certain elements of philosophy in Europe, in time lead to their establishment as new disciplines, separate from philosophy. Natural philosophy became the study of physics, moral philosophy evolved into sociology and anthropology and psychology became a branch of study free of the influence of philosophy. These developments were reflected in Canada during the late nineteenth and early twentieth century. The first full professorships in physics as distinct from natural philosophy were established at Dalhousie, Halifax, in 1879, Toronto, 1887 and McGill, in Montreal in 1890. Although these were mainly teaching positions there was some research activity. At Dalhousie, Professor J.G. MacGregor, the first to hold the position at that university, published about 50 papers during his tenure from 1879 until 1899. Other prominent researchers in the field at this time included H.L. Callendar and E. Rutherford, Macdonald professors of physics at McGill and J.C. McLennan at U of T.

Psychology in Canada was initially considered a part of the discipline of philosophy and university courses were given by members of philosophy departments. The first course in psychology in Canada was taught at Dalhousie University in 1838 by Thomas McCulloch within the framework of studies in philosophy. By 1866 Dalhousie hosted a chair in psychology and metaphysics. McGill offered courses beginning in 1850 when lectures in the topic were presented by Professor W.T.Leach with a doctorate from Edinburgh. The first psychology text written in Canada was penned by William Lyall of Halifax in 1855. However, by the end of the century psychology was still considered an adjunct to philosophy, not a subject of importance per se, but rather a prerequisite for the advanced study of ethics and metaphysics.

Psychology slowly began to make its mark as a separate discipline in the latter part of the nineteenth century. The first psychology laboratory in Canada was founded at the University of Toronto by Professor James Mark Baldwin in 1890. It was here in 1909, that August Kirschmann, who had studied under Professor Wundt at his famous laboratory in Leipzig, undertook the first fundamental psychological research in Canada and presented seminars on the, "new psychology". Dr. George Sidney Brett, a noted philosopher at the University of Toronto, wrote the three volume History of Psychology between 1912 and 1921. McGill established a psychological laboratory under the directorship of Professor William Dunlop Tait in 1910, followed by the creation of a psychology department separate from philosophy in 1922. Toronto soon founded an autonomous psychology department of its own. McMaster employed a professor in psychology by 1890. The First World War had an important positive effect on the discipline which was recognized for its use in the fields of personnel selection, training and the post-war rehabilitation of wounded soldiers.

In the years following World War I, the number of staff at the U of T increased to seven and important research was undertaken by Dr. E. A. Bott relating to the rehabilitation of soldiers with muscular disabilities. By 1927 the psychology department at U of T had achieved full independence from the bonds of the department of philosophy. During this period Hans Selye undertook fundamental studies of stress which cut across the boundaries of medical research, biology and psychology. He began his work at McGill in 1936 and continued his investigations at the University of Montreal starting in 1945. He described the functioning of the hypothalamic-pituitary-adrenal axis as the body's mechanism for coping with stress and published a number of books including The Stress of Life in 1953.

While still under the influence of the departments of philosophy, noted philosophers such as John Watson at Queens, John MacEachran at Alberta, William Caldwell at McGill and G.S Brett at U of T, championed the recognition of psychology as a discipline in its own right, leading to the creation of separate departments of philosophy and psychology in many universities. By the end of the thirties the growth of the discipline was sufficient to warrant the establishment of the Canadian Psychological Association in 1939. The discipline of sociology evolved from the ideas of philosophers Auguste Comte and Émile Durkheim in France in the nineteenth century. However it was not until 1922 that Carl A. Dawson was appointed Canada's first professor of sociology at McGill. Honours programmes in sociology were established at McGill in 1926 and at the University of Toronto in 1932. Anthropology evolved from a long history of interest in Canada's native peoples on the part of Jesuit missionaries, explorers and university professors including Sir Daniel Wilson at the University of Toronto and Sir John William Dawson at McGill and the inspiration provided by moral philosophy. Professional anthropology got its start in Canada in 1910 when Prime Minister Wilfrid Laurier established the Division of Anthropology as a part of the Geological Survey of Canada.

== 1965–present ==
=== Fields ===
Epistemology

Studies in this field have often focused on the philosophy of psychology. Important work in this area has been done in Canada, particularly at the Centre for Cognitive Science at the University of Western Ontario by, Patricia and Paul Churchland, Zenon Pylyshyn, and Ausonio Marras in the early eighties.

Logic

Studies in logic have been undertaken by a number of individuals. Bas Van Fraassen, William Rozeboom and Alasdair Urquhart have specialized in the semantics of logic, while Hans Herzberger and William Harper have studied the nature of preference. John Woods has investigated concepts relating to relevance and paradox. Others have made contributions to the field, including Charles Morgan (modal logics), Charles Morgan (probability semantics), and Anil Gupta (the semantics of truth and paradoxes).

Philosophy of mind

All Group of Thirteen have departments of philosophy with doctorate-level staff members conducting research related to the philosophy of mind. The work of Dr. Paul R. Thagard, at the University of Waterloo, with respect to cognitive functions and coherence, is of note. Charles Taylor, emeritus professor at McGill University in Montreal, has studied consciousness within the context of Hegelianism. Zenon Pylyshyn a psychologist and computer scientist at the University of Western Ontario from 1964 to 1994, has made significant contributions to cognitive science. Other Canadian-born and educated cognitive scientists have made their mark in the US, including David Kirsh, John Robert Anderson, Keith Holyoak, and Steven Pinker.

Metaphysics and religion

Metaphysics deals with the study of the nature of reality. Since the Enlightenment, reality has been seen through the lenses of both religion and science, and frequently there has been a conflict between the views of the two. Following the horrors of the Second World War, the attacks on the views of religion became particularly vigorous with science on the offensive.

Canadian philosophers in the postwar era have attempted, in a number of ways, to resolve these conflicts and to legitimize religious belief. A variety of approaches have been used. Some have stressed the similarities between religion and science, as have F.W. Waters (1967) and Alastair McKinnon (1970). Others, including Lionel Rubinoff, have emphasized the importance of placing our scientific view of the world in a larger human context. There have been attempts to resolve the conflict, through science, as seen in the writings of Charles De Koninck (1960), Thomas Goudge (1961), and A.H. Johnson (1962). Others have attempted to argue the rational nature of religious belief. Some, inspired by St. Thomas Aquinas, include Bernard Lonergan (1952), Louis-Marie Régis (1959), Joseph Owens (1968), Jean-Louis Allard (1979, 1982), and Lawrence Dewan, OP. More general approaches defending the reasonability of religion have been taken by Leslie Armour and William Sweet. Still others have attempted to address issues in the philosophy of religion by questioning underlying issues in metaphysics. Those following this approach within the analytic tradition include Kai Nielsen, Donald Evans (1963), Terence Penelhum (1970), Alistair M. Macleod (1973), and Jay Newman (1986). Phenomenology has also played a role, as seen in the work of Emil Fackenheim (1961), Benoit Pruche (1977–1980), René l'Ecuyer (1980), Jacques Croteau (1981), Cyril Welch (1982), Gary Madison (1988), Hendrik Hart (1990), Jean Grondin (1995), and Thomas De Koninck (1995).

Ethics – social and political philosophy

Ethics is the study of questions concerning the nature of right and wrong and good and bad as they relate to human conduct. In many cases, the aim is to use philosophy to make our world and society a better place. Work in the field has grown in the postwar years. Research has been undertaken by a large number of individuals including Francis Sparshott, Kai Nielsen, David Braybrooke, Jonathan Bennett, Gerald Cohen, Donald Brown, Daniel Weinstock, William Sweet, Charles Taylor. Wayne Sumner has been active in the field of applied philosophy. Real Fillion has brought together philosophy and politics in his original work in multiculturalism.

The minority position of the French language and culture in Canada and North America is reflected in the preoccupation of a large number of French Canadian philosophers with metaethics. Fernand Dumont, Claude Savary, Jacques Grand'Maison, Michel Morin, Claude Bertrand, Joseph Pestieau, Ferdinand Dumond, Guy Laforest, Louis Balthazar, Vincent Lemieux, Guy Laforest, François Blais, Diane Lamoureux, Michel Seymour, Gerard Bergeron, Maurice Lagueux, Jean Guy Meunier, Serge Cantin, Jean Roy, Guy Lafrance, Roger Lambert, Dominique Leydet, Gilles Labelle, Yvonne Thériault, Guy Lafrance, Josiane Ayoub, Pierre Robert, Bjarne Melkevik, and Philip Knee have made important contributions. They may be considered the secular descendants of their Thomist ancestors Of particular interest is the work of the economist and Thomist philosopher Bernard Lonergan, as reflected in Insight: A Study of Human Understanding (1957), and Method in Theology (1972), which described his Generalized Empirical Method. His writings are the subject of a 25 volume collection being edited by the University of Toronto Press.

Continental philosophy

European philosophers of the 20th century launched a number of philosophical movements that were revolutionary both within philosophy and in the larger culture. These movements—phenomenology, existentialism and deconstruction—were often not well received in North American universities, but they have been a regular and growing part of the philosophical landscape of North America since the 1950s, and Canadian universities have played an important role in the development and dissemination of these philosophical ideas. In the 1970s and 1980s, the University of Toronto in particular was internationally known for its experts in what is often called "continental philosophy". Emil Fackenheim, Kenneth L. Schmitz, Graeme Nicholson, and others made the University of Toronto an international centre for the study of these approaches to philosophical inquiry. At the same time Graeme Nicholson's teacher James Doull, a Hegelian whom Emil Fackenheim notably debated in print on matters relating to the interpretation of Hegel, taught philosophy as well as classical literature in the Classics Department at Dalhousie University in Halifax. Currently, the University of Toronto, with scholars such as Robert Gibbs and Rebecca Comay , Ryerson University in Toronto, with Kym Maclaren, John Caruana, David Ciavatta, and Paula Schwebel, the University of Guelph, with John Russon, and McGill University, with scholars such as Philip Buckley, George Di Giovanni, Hasana Sharp and Alia Al-Saji, are major North American centres for research and teaching in the continental traditions of philosophy.

=== Associations and related activities ===
These years saw Canadian philosophy develop to the point where a professional organization, The Canadian Philosophical Association (ACPA), was established in 1958 to encourage and promote philosophy in Canada. This was followed by the founding of regional associations in Ontario, Quebec, the west and Atlantic Canada, and the initiation of the Canadian Philosophical Association Annual Congress. The professional journal, Dialogue was established in 1962, and the Canadian Journal of Philosophy in 1971. Philosophers of note who have been published there include, Joel Feinberg (1974), Jonathan Bennett (philosopher) (1974), Terence Parsons (1980), William C. Wimsatt (1994) and David Gauthier (1994).

== See also ==
- List of Canadian philosophers
- Scientific research in Canada
- Anarchism in Canada
- Canadian Society for History and Philosophy of Mathematics
- Canadian Idealism
- Toronto School of communication theory
