= Dieter Misgeld =

Canadian philosopher

- Born: 1938 (age 87–88); Ruhr Valley, Germany

Philosophical work
- Era: 21st century philosophy
- Region: Western philosophy
- School: Continental philosophy Hermeneutics
- Notable students: Hossein Mesbahian
- Main interests: Social theory

Dieter Misgeld (born 1938) is a German-Canadian philosopher. He was a professor of philosophy of education in the department of Theory and Policy Studies at the Ontario Institute for Studies in Education (OISE), at University of Toronto for 35 years. Born in Germany, Misgeld studied philosophy with Gadamer and Habermas before moving to Canada. He is known for his research on social theory, human rights, political philosophy, hermeneutics and the philosophy of Jürgen Habermas and Hans-Georg Gadamer.

A biography of Misgeld (Dieter Misgeld: A Philosopher’s Journey from Hermeneutics to Emancipatory Politics) was written by Hossein Mesbahian and Trevor Norris, and published in 2017 by a subsidiary of Brill Publishers.

== Bibliography ==
- Hans-Georg Gadamer, Dieter Misgeld, Graeme Nicholson (1992). Hans-Georg Gadamer on Education, Poetry, and History. New York: SUNY Press.
- (1987). Modern German Sociology, edited by Volker Meja, Dieter Misgeld, and Nico Stehr. New York: Columbia University Press.

== See also ==
- Philosophy in Canada
- Graeme Nicholson
- Muzi Epifani
