= Jennifer Bates (philosopher) =

Professor of philosophy

- Born: 1964 (age 61–62)

Academic background
- Education: University of Toronto (PhD)
- Thesis: The Genesis and Spirit of Imagination (Hegel's Theory of Imagination Between 1801-1807) (1997)
- Doctoral advisor: H. S. Harris, Kenneth L. Schmitz
- Other advisors: Graeme Nicholson, Joseph Owens, Hans Friedrich Fulda

Academic work
- Era: Contemporary philosophy
- Region: Western philosophy
- School or tradition: German Idealism
- Institutions: Duquesne University
- Website: https://www.duq.edu/faculty-and-staff/jennifer-bates.php

Jennifer Ann Bates (born 1964) is a professor of philosophy at Duquesne University.

== Life and works ==
Bates received her PhD on The Genesis and Spirit of Imagination, under the direction of H. S. Harris and K. L. Schmitz in 1997 from the University of Toronto.

=== Selected publications ===
==== Monographs ====
- Bates, Jennifer Ann (2025). Over-Measure in Kant, Hegel, and Shakespeare: Putting the Principles Into Play. Bloomsbury Publishing Plc. doi:10.5040/9781978747708. ISBN 978-1-9787-4770-8.
- Bates, Jennifer Ann (2012). Hegel's Theory of Imagination. SUNY Press. doi:10.1515/9780791484456. ISBN 978-0-7914-8445-6.
- Bates, Jennifer Ann, ed. (29 September 2010). Hegel and Shakespeare on Moral Imagination. SUNY Press. doi:10.1515/9781438432434. ISBN 978-1-4384-3243-4.

==== Editorials ====
- Bates, Jennifer; Wilson, Richard (10 September 2014). Shakespeare and Continental Philosophy. Edinburgh University Press. doi:10.1515/9780748694952. ISBN 978-0-7486-9495-2.

==== Articles ====
- "The Rub of the Negative: Concrete Universality, the Sache selbst, and Noumena in Cutrofello's All for Nothing". Philosophy Today. 61 (2): 439–450. 26 July 2017. doi:10.5840/philtoday2017612161.
