= Canadian Society for the Study of Religion =

Canadian academic society

- Société Canadienne pour l'Étude de la Religion
- Abbreviation: CSSR
- Formation: 1965; 61 years ago
- Founders: George Grant; William Nicholls; Boyd Sinyard
- Type: Learned society
- Region served: Canada
- Field: Religious studies
- Official languages: English; French
- President: Alison Marshall
- Affiliations: Canadian Corporation for Studies in Religion; Canadian Federation for the Humanities and Social Sciences; International Association for the History of Religions
- Website: cssrscer.ca

The Canadian Society for the Study of Religion (CSSR; French: Société Canadienne pour l'Étude de la Religion [SCÉR]) is a Canadian academic society oriented to the scholarly study of religion. It was established in 1965.

== Partner societies ==
As described on the CSSR website's "Our Partners" page, this society is affiliated with a number of other Canadian, American, and international academic societies focused on the study of religion. Among them, the CSSR maintains close liaison with the Société Québécoise pour l'Étude de la Religion. The society is also a member of the International Association for the History of Religions and the Canadian Federation for the Humanities and Social Sciences.

In 1971, the CSSR helped found the Canadian Corporation for Studies in Religion.

== Presidents ==
- 1967–1969: Eugene Combs
- 1971–1974: Charles Davis
- 1977: Louis Rousseau
- c. 1970s: Jacques Langlais
- c. 1980: Peter Slater
- 1988: Bruce Alton
- Harold Coward
- 1994–1996: Morny Joy
- 1996–1998: William Closson James
- 2001–2002: Randi R. Warne
- 2005: Leona Anderson
- 2006–2008: Peter Beyer
- 2008–2010: Michel Desjardins
- 2010–2012: Darlene Juschka
- 2012–2016: Rubina Ramji
- 2016–2020: Heather Shipley
- 2020–2022: Paul Gareau
- 2022–2024: Diana Dimitrova
- 2024-2026 : Alison Marshall

== See also ==
- American Academy of Religion
- Canadian Theological Society
- List of learned societies
