= William F. Vallicella =

American philosopher

William F. Vallicella is an American philosopher.

== Biography ==
Vallicella has a Ph.D. (Boston College; 1978), taught for a number of years at University of Dayton (where he was a tenured Associate Professor of Philosophy; 1978–91) and Case Western Reserve University (Visiting Associate Professor of Philosophy; 1989–91), and retired to Gold Canyon, Arizona from where he now contributes to philosophy mainly online. He is the author of many published articles, primarily on the subjects of metaphysics and philosophy of religion.

In the short chapter on him in the book Falling in Love with Wisdom: American Philosophers Talk About Their Calling, Vallicella discusses the philosophical questions which he happened to think about in his youth, such as "What if God hadn't created anything?", "What if even God didn't exist", and "Why is good, good, and evil, evil?", and his thoughts on the inquiry of philosophy.

== Publications ==
=== Books ===
- Kant, subjectivity and facticity, Boston College, 1978
- A Paradigm Theory of Existence: Onto-Theology Vindicated, Kluwer Academic Publishers 2002, ISBN 1-4020-0887-2. Forbes summarizes this book as follows:

What is it for any contingent thing to exist? Why does any contingent thing exist? For some time now, the preferred style in addressing such questions has been deflationary when it has not been eliminativist. In its critical half, this book thoroughly analyzes and demolishes the main deflationary and eliminativist accounts of existence, including those of Brentano, Frege, Russell, and Quine, thereby restoring existence to its rightful place as one of the deep topics in philosophy, if not the deepest. In its constructive half, the book defends the thesis that the two questions admit of a unified answer, and that this answer takes the form of what the author calls a paradigm theory of existence. The central idea of the paradigm theory is that existence itself is a paradigmatically existent concrete individual. In this way the author vindicates onto-theology and puts paid to the Heideggerian conceit that Being cannot itself be a being. This work will be of interest to all serious students and teachers of philosophy, especially those interested in metaphysics and the philosophy of religion.

==== Chapters ====
- The Problem of Existence, by Arthur Witherall, Aldershot: Ashgate Publishing, 2002, Philo, 6 (1), 2003, 176–88.
- Philosophia Christi, Volume 6, Issue 1, Chapter: "The Moreland Willard Lotze Thesis on Being," p. 27, Evangelical Philosophical Society, 2004.
- The philosophy of Panayot Butchvarov: a collegial evaluation, Larry Lee Blackman, Chapter: "Does Existence Itself Exist?; Transcendental Nihilism Meets the Paradigm Theory", p. 57, Volume 62 of Problems in contemporary philosophy, E. Mellen Press, 2005, ISBN 0-7734-6108-6, ISBN 978-0-7734-6108-6.
- Proceedings of the Heraclitean Society, Volume 19, Chapter: "Is Existence a Property of Individuals?," p. 19, William F. Vallicella, Western Michigan University, Heraclitean Society.
- https://www.taylorfrancis.com/chapters/edit/10.4324/9781315885551-5/existence-william-vallicella, Chapter: 5, Existence, Two Dogmas of Analysis, in Neo-Aristotelian Perspectives in Metaphysics, Routledge, 2014

=== Articles ===
He has published over 40 scholarly articles, including:

- The article on divine simplicity in the Stanford Encyclopedia of Philosophy, 2006
- "Classical Theism and Global Supervenience Physicalism"
- "To the Tautological Interpretation: Review of Robert Sokolowski", WF Vallicella, Philosophy & Social Criticism, 1974
- "Sokolowski on Husserl: From the Metaphysical to the Tautological Interpretation," WF Vallicella, Cultural Hermeneutics, 1976
- "Kant, subjectivity and facticity", WF Vallicella, 1978, Boston College
- "The Problem of Being in the Early Heidegger", WF Vallicella, The Thomist, 1981
- "A Critique of the Quantificational Account of Existence", WF Vallicella, The Thomist, 1983
- "Kant, Heidegger, and the Problem of the Thing in Itself", WF Vallicella, International Philosophical Quarterly, 1983
- "Relativism, Truth, and the Symmetry Thesis", WF Vallicella, Monist, 1984
- "Heidegger's Reduction of Being to Truth," WF Vallicella, The New Scholasticism, 1985
- "A Note on Hintikka's Refutation of the Ontological Argument," WF Vallicella, Faith Phil 6, 1989
- "Reply to Zimmerman: Heidegger and the problem of being", WF Vallicella, International Philosophical Quarterly, 1990
- "Two Faces of Theism, WF Vallicella, Idealistic Studies, 1990
- "Consciousness and Intentionality: Illusions?", W Vallicella, Idealistic Studies, 1991
- "Divine Simplicity: A New Defense", W Vallicella, Faith and Philosophy, 1992
- "Has the Ontological Argument Been Refuted?", WF Vallicella, Religious Studies, 1993
- "Existence and Indefinite Identifiability", WF Vallicella, Southwest Philosophy Review, 1995
- "No time for propositions", WF Vallicella, Philosophia, 1995; discussed by Le Poidevan here
- "Concurrentism or occasionalism?," Vallicella, The American Catholic Philosophical Quarterly, 1996
- "John Polkinghorne, The Faith of a Physicist: Reflections of a Bottom-Up Thinker," WF Vallicella, International Studies in Philosophy, 1996, State University of New York
- "Bundles and indiscernibility: a reply to O'Leary-Hawthorne", WF Vallicella, Analysis, 1997
- "The Hume-Edwards Objection to the Cosmological Argument", WF Vallicella, Journal of Philosophical Research, 1997
- "On an Insufficient Argument Against Sufficient Reason", WF Vallicella, Ratio, 1997
- "Could a Classical Theist Be a Physicalist?," WF Vallicella, Faith and Philosophy, 1998, The University of Notre Dame
- "Bradley's Regress Argument and Relation-Instances", WF Vallicella, The Modern Schoolman, 1999/2004
- "God, causation and occasionalism", WF Vallicella, Religious Studies, 1999, Cambridge Univ Press
- "Could the Universe Cause itself to Exist?", 75: 604–612, WF Vallicella, 2000, Cambridge University Press
- "Does the Cosmological Argument Depend on the Ontological?", W Vallicella, Faith and Philosophy, 2000
- "From facts to God: An onto-cosmological argument", WF Vallicella, International Journal for Philosophy of Religion, 2000
- "Heidegger's Beiträge zur Philosophie," 139–56, William F. Vallicella, Religion, 2000
- "Meinong's Complexes", The Monist, LXXXIII, pp. 89–100, William Vallicella, 2000.
- "Three Conceptions of States of Affairs", WF Vallicella, Noûs, 34 (2), 237–59, 2000
- "Brentano on Existence", WF Vallicella, History of Philosophy Quarterly, 2001, Bowling Green State University
- "No self? A look at a Buddhist argument," WF Vallicella, International Philosophical Quarterly, 2002
- "The creation–conservation dilemma and presentist four-dimensionalism", WF Vallicella, Religious Studies, 2002, Cambridge University Press
- "Incarnation and Identity," WF Valicella, Philo, vol. 5, no. 1 (Spring-Summer 2002), pp. 84–93
- "Relations, Monism, and the Vindication of Bradley's Regress", Dialectica 56 (1), 3–35, 2002
- "A Paradigm Theory of Existence: Onto-Theology Vindicated," William F. Vallicella, L Armour – Philosophy in Review, 2003
- "Kant Chastened But Vindicated: Rejoinder to Forgie, WF Vallicella, Faith and Philosophy," 2004, The University of Notre Dame
- "Does Existence Itself Exist? Transcendental Nihilism Meets the Paradigm Theory", WF Vallicella, Problems in Contemporary Philosophy, 2005
- "Melville Y. Stewart. The Greater-Good Defence: An Essay on the Rationality of Faith," Pp. xi+, WF Vallicella, Religious Studies, 2008, Cambridge University Press

== See also ==
- American philosophy
- List of American philosophers
