= Michael Baur =

Michael Baur may refer to:

- Michael Baur (philosopher)
- Michael Baur (footballer)
