= Newman Lecture =

Newman Lecture may refer to:

- The Newman Lecture, an annual lecture series at Mannix College, Monash University, Melbourne, Australia
- The Newman Lecture, a lecture series at St Patrick's Pontifical University, Maynooth, Ireland

== See also ==
- Jay Newman Memorial Lecture, Canada
