= Ellen Leonard =

Canadian theologian and Roman Catholic religious sister (1933–2022)

Sister Ellen Leonard CSJ
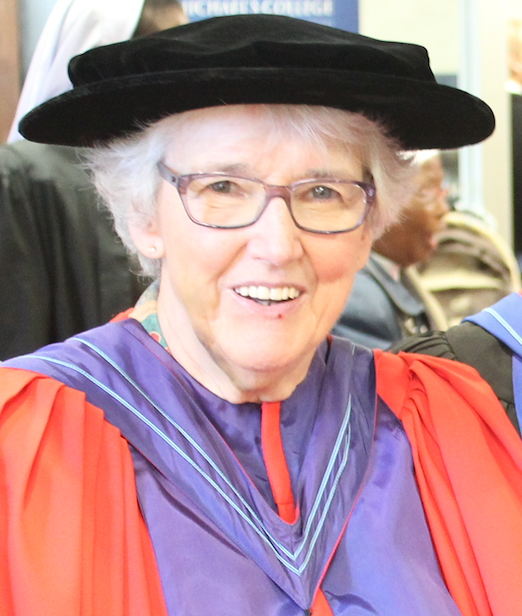
- Leonard in 2011
- Born: Ellen Margaret Leonard; August 26, 1933; Toronto, Ontario, Canada
- Died: August 18, 2022 (aged 88); Toronto, Ontario, Canada
- Other name: Sister Loyola

Religious life
- Religion: Christianity (Roman Catholic)
- Church: Latin Church

Academic background
- Education: University of Toronto; Manhattan College; St. Michael's College, Toronto
- Thesis: The Question of Catholicism in the Modernist Period (1978)

Academic work
- Discipline: Theology
- Sub-discipline: Systematic theology; Christology; pastoral theology
- Institutions: St. Michael's College, Toronto
- Main interests: Feminist and ecological Christologies

Ellen Margaret Leonard CSJ (August 26, 1933 – August 18, 2022) was a Canadian systematic theologian and Roman Catholic religious sister. She published three books on figures important in Roman Catholic modernism, and wrote about feminist and ecological Christologies. She served as the president of the Canadian Theological Society from 1989 to 1990. She entered the Congregation of the Sisters of St. Joseph (CSJ) after high school and worked as a teacher and administrator, prior to earning her PhD and joining the Faculty of Theology at University of St. Michael's College. She received an honorary doctorate from the University of St. Michael's College in 2014. She died on August 18, 2022, in Toronto, Ontario.

== Early life ==
Ellen Leonard was born in Toronto, Ontario, Canada, in 1933 to Hugh and Mary Leonard, as the elder of two daughters. She traced her connection to the Congregation of the Sisters of St. Joseph (CSJ), the congregation she eventually joined, to the moment of her birth at St. Michael's Hospital, describing it as "under the eye of Sr. Vincentia". One of her aunts was also a teacher and a member of the congregation. Her early education was at a local Catholic school run by the Loretto sisters, but she encountered the CSJ again during her high school education at St. Joseph's College School. Feeling drawn to the CSJ sisters because of their "kindness, competence and dedication", she entered their order directly after high school.

== Religious life and career ==
=== Early career ===
Leonard joined the Congregation of the Sisters of St. Joseph on September 8, 1951. She completed a six-month postulancy period and then entered the novitiate on March 19, 1952, receiving her religious habit and the name "Sister Loyola". As part of her postulancy, she completed a teaching program (1954–55) offered by Toronto Normal School. She then spent most of the next 18 years (1955–73) as an elementary school teacher, principal, and religious resource teacher in Niagara and the greater Toronto area. While working full time, she also returned to college for evening, weekend, and summer study, completing her Bachelor of Arts degree at the University of Toronto in 1967.

=== Transition to theology ===
The Toronto Metropolitan Separate School Board encouraged those teaching catechism to update their religious education in the wake of the Second Vatican Council (1962–1965). Leonard left elementary teaching behind and moved forward in her theological education by earning a master's degree in religious studies from Manhattan College in New York City in 1971. Influenced by Vatican II, her religious order allowed members to retake their baptismal names and Ellen Leonard exchanged her religious name, Loyola, for her birth name, Ellen Leonard. She also set aside her habit and veil and moved into a small community of six sisters rather than remain in the large motherhouse of the Sister of St. Joseph.

Leonard began doctoral studies at the University of St. Michael's College at the University of Toronto in 1973. There she became a teaching assistant in the Department of Religious Studies. She joined the Faculty of Theology at St. Michael's as a lecturer during her final year of doctoral studies. She completed her doctorate and became assistant professor in 1978. She gained her associate professorship in 1982 and became a full professor in 1991. She remained a full-time faculty member at St. Michael's until she retired in 1999 with emerita status. She was among the first women in Canada to study systematic theology and among the first women in Canada to teach on a faculty of theology.

=== Research ===
Leonard's dissertation and subsequent first book was on George Tyrrell, a Jesuit priest and key theologian in Catholic modernism. Leonard described modernism as a controversial orientation through which scholars at the turn of the twentieth century grappled with advances in science, philosophical ideas about individual autonomy, and changing methods of biblical interpretation. Leonard contributed the definition of Roman Catholic Modernism to The Cambridge Dictionary of Christianity, noting that, "viewed in its historical context, Modernism can be interpreted as a renewal within Catholicism that offered an alternative to the liberal Protestant outlook and in some ways anticipated the Second Vatican Council". She also served on the steering committee of the Roman Catholic Modernism group of the American Academy of Religion.

Leonard argued that Tyrrell's ideas on modernism were pastoral rather than developmental of a systematic theology of reform. But, she noted that Tyrrell's ideas presaged Vatican II in their exploration of ecumenism and the place of the episcopacy in a universal church, the need for a more active role of the laity, the need to place limits on ecclesial authority, and the acceptance of criticism and dissent within the church. Leonard's subsequent books addressed two other figures related to Catholic modernism, Maude Petre and Friedrich von Hügel. The ideas of these modernists were emblematic of Vatican II. Leonard observes, "their understanding of Catholicism was broad enough and deep enough to sustain their Catholic identity—an identity that was at once both critical and faithful." These works prompted Leonard to reflect on "how she might participate in the theological and ecclesial questions of renewal in her own time."

Leonard argues in her magazine article that the Second Vatican Council "reveal[ed] dramatic changes in worldview. We were instructed to discern the signs of the times ... One of the most significant teachings of the Council was its emphasis on the universal call to holiness. Baptism was recognized as the common sacrament." She further argued that emphasis on the universal call to holiness required a re-examination of the use of experience as a source for theology. In a paper presented to the Catholic Theological Society of America, "Experience as a Source for Theology", Leonard clarified that the task that she was undertaking was a consideration not of whether experience should be used but "how experience is being used as a source for theology today, with an emphasis on the foundational role of present experience and a recognition of the widening experiential base for theological reflection." That discussion formed the first part of her paper, followed by consideration of her own experience as a Canadian woman and parallel transitions in the Canadian and feminist context. The final section of her paper discussed how her "Canadian and feminist experiences may be used as a source for theology." Leonard later reworked this paper into a 1990 article in Studies in Religion/Sciences religieuses.

=== Ecumenism ===
Ecumenical engagement played a significant role in Leonard's professional life, in the period following Vatican II and the decree on ecumenism, Unitatis redintegratio. In 1966, St. Michael's joined the Toronto Graduate School of Theological Studies, and this partnership led to the establishment in 1970 of the Toronto School of Theology, a consortium consisting of seven colleges from Catholic, Presbyterian, Anglican, and United Church denominations. As a result of teaching within this consortium, Leonard had the opportunity to meet other female theology professors, working with them and their male colleagues in a supportive environment. She also saw changes within her own Roman Catholic–affiliated college as it admitted women students and established a more diverse student body.

In 1975, Leonard was appointed by the Canadian Conference of Catholic Bishops to serve as a member of the Roman Catholic–United Church National Dialogue. She served in this capacity from 1975 to 1984. Although the Roman Catholic Church is not a member of the World Council of Churches (WCC), they have observer status at the WCC's septennial global assemblies. Leonard attended two WCC assemblies as an accredited observer: the sixth assembly in Vancouver, Canada, in 1983, and the seventh assembly in Canberra, Australia, in 1991. In Vancouver, she was especially moved by the voices of women speaking on behalf of their people and children. Her experience at the Canberra assembly reinforced her conviction that Western feminist theologians need to listen to the voices of indigenous feminist theologians and those from the global south.

=== Feminist and ecological Christologies ===
In her writings, Leonard situates the women's movement and the ecological movement within the "signs of the times" that Vatican II called upon the church to address. She argues that "feminism is a prophetic movement, one that calls for conversion". Leonard was especially interested in how personal experience and social location influenced the shaping of Christology. Her article "Contemporary Christologies in Response to Feminist and Ecological Challenges" examines this question in depth. After a literature review of works that identified the androcentric and anthropocentric bias in traditional Christology, she reviews the work of theologians Rosemary Radford Ruether, Sallie McFague, and Elizabeth Johnson. In examining their work, she highlights four aspects: "(1) biblical foundation; (2) continuity with the tradition; (3) promotion of the full humanity of women; and (4) openness to the whole of creation". Leonard herself advocates for a Wisdom Christology and observes that "the image of Sophia provides a fluid symbol, which can embrace all of creation while her incarnation in Jesus of Nazareth reveals to us the concrete way that God chose to be present in our world. That presence continues through the Spirit of the resurrected Christ-Sophia to offer hope of transformation to everyone and everything".

Leonard has also been supportive of the ordination of women in the Catholic Church. She and three other women met in January 1981 to plan for a conference in Canada to discuss the question. This conference, held July 3–5, 1981, led to the founding of Canadian Catholics for Women's Ordination (CCWO). Leonard was a core member of the group for the next seven years as it formalized an organizational structure, began a newsletter, and connected with groups pursuing the same goal in other countries. During that period she also helped to bring discussions of feminist theology to a broader audience by presenting public lectures and workshops in parishes. She stepped down from CCWO's core leadership group in 1986, and the organization was reshaped into the Catholic Network for Women's Equality (CNWE) in 1988. Leonard was a keynote speaker at the CNWE conference in 2001, which CNWE marked as the 20th anniversary of the group's founding. She was recognized as a co-founder of the organization at the 2015 CNWE conference.

== Illness and death ==
Leonard, who had Parkinson's disease, lived in the Sisters of St. Joseph home in Toronto in her final years. She died on August 18, 2022.

== Honours ==
Leonard was recognized for her academic work as well as her activism. In March 2000, the Toronto Journal of Theology published "Crossroads in Christology: A Festschrift for Ellen M. Leonard, CSJ", a collection of essays about her work and her influence as a scholar and teacher. In 2004, Leonard received the Ann O'Hara Graff Award from the Women's Seminar in Constructive Theology of the Catholic Theological Society of America. The award "recognizes women who integrate their faith scholarship, and mentorship of and advocacy for women in the 'broadest sense of the church,' and who contribute to the 'renewal of theology.'" In 2005, the YWCA Toronto recognized her with a 2005 Women of Distinction Award in the category of religion and education. In recognition of her work with recent immigrants, Leonard received the inaugural Becoming Neighbours Annual Margaret Myatt, CSJ, Recognition Award in 2012. In 2014, University of St. Michael's College awarded her an honorary doctorate in sacred letters.

== Selected works ==
- "Tyrrell's Understanding of Catholicism." In Working Group on Roman Catholic Modernism, American Academy of Religion (AAR) Annual Meeting, edited by Ronald Burke and George Gilmore (1979), 3-24. Spring Hill College: Mobile, AL.
- Leonard, Ellen M. (1982). George Tyrrell and the Catholic tradition. London: Darton, Longman, and Todd. ISBN 0-8091-2424-6.
- "Experience as a Source for Theology." Catholic Theological Society of America Proceedings.(1988) 43: 44–61.
- Unresting Transformation: The Theology and Spirituality of Maude Petre, Lanham, Maryland: University Press of America, 1991 ISBN 0819182206
- "Contemporary Christologies in Response to Feminist and Ecological Challenges" (2000-03-01) Toronto Journal of Theology 16 (1): 15-26.
- "Awakenings: Ecumenism, Feminism, Ecology" (2009-12-04) Toronto Journal of Theology 25 (Supplement 1): 91-100.
- Leonard, Ellen M. (1997). Creative tension : the spiritual legacy of Friedrich von Hügel. Scranton, Pennsylvania: University of Scranton Press. ISBN 0-585-03705-1.

== See also ==
- Christian feminism
