= From Victoria to Vladivostok =

2010 book by Ben Isitt

From Victoria to Vladivostok: Canada's Siberian Expedition, 1917-19
- Author: Ben Isitt
- Language: English
- Genre: Non-fiction
- Publisher: University British Columbia Press
- Publication date: 2010
- Publication place: Canada

From Victoria to Vladivostok: Canada's Siberian Expedition, 1917-19 is a 2010 book written by Ben Isitt. It was published by University British Columbia Press, and translated into a French-language edition by Presses de l'Université Laval and a Russian-language edition by the Korpus Company in Vladivostok.

== Reception ==
Mark Osborne Humphries praised the book, and wrote in Left History that "Isitt is at his best here".

== Bibliography ==
- Humphries, Mark Osborne (2011). "Benjamin Isitt, From Victoria to Vladivostok: Canada's Siberian Expedition, 1917–19". Left History. 15 (2): 126–127.
- Johnson, R.E. (2013). "From Victoria to Vladivostok: Canada's Siberian Expedition, 1917–1919 by Benjamin Isitt (review)". University of Toronto Quarterly. 82 (3): 553–554.
- Smele, Jonathan D. (2011). "From Victoria to Vladivostok: Canada's Siberian Expedition, 1917-19 (review)". Labour / Le Travail (67): 219–221.
