= Rebecca Comay =

Canadian academic

- Born: August 16, 1955 (age 71)

Education
- Education: University of Toronto (PhD, 1986)
- Thesis: "Beyond" "Aufhebung": Reflections on the Bad Infinite (1986)
- Doctoral advisor: Graeme Nicholson

Philosophical work
- Era: Contemporary philosophy
- Region: Western philosophy
- School: German idealism
- Institutions: University of Toronto
- Doctoral students: Michael Baur
- Website: https://www.rebeccacomay.com/

Rebecca Comay (born August 16, 1955) is a Canadian professor of philosophy and comparative literature at the University of Toronto.

== Life and works ==
Comay Earned her MA in philosophy in 1978 from the University of Toronto, and later completed her Ph.D. in 1989, where her dissertation—“Beyond ‘Aufhebung’: Reflections on the Bad Infinite in Hegel”—examined the concept of the “bad infinite” in Hegelian dialectics.

=== Selected publications ===
- Comay, Rebecca (2020). Mourning Sickness. doi:10.1515/9780804775731. ISBN 978-0-8047-7573-1.
- Comay, Rebecca; Ruda, Frank (2018). The Dash—The Other Side of Absolute Knowing. doi:10.7551/mitpress/10877.001.0001. ISBN 978-0-262-34652-8.
