= Jay Newman =

American-Canadian philosopher and educator (1948–2007)

- Born: 28 February 1948; Brooklyn, New York, U.S.
- Died: 17 June 2007 (aged 59); Guelph, Ontario, Canada

Philosophical work
- Era: 20th-century philosophy
- Region: Western philosophy
- Main interests: Philosophy of religion Philosophy of culture Ethics of mass communication

Jay Newman (February 28, 1948 – June 17, 2007) was a philosopher and Professor at the University of Guelph in Guelph, Ontario.

== Early life and education ==
Newman was born on February 28, 1948 in Brooklyn, New York, the son of Lou Newman and his wife, Kitty.

He received his B.A. from Brooklyn College in 1968 before acquiring his master's degree from Brown University in 1969 and his Ph.D. from York University in Toronto, Canada, in 1971.

== Career ==
Newman began teaching at the University of Guelph in 1971, where he taught until his death. His fields of study (and his 11 books) included philosophy of religion, philosophy of culture, and the ethics of mass communication. He became a Canadian citizen in 1986.

== Other activities and personal life ==
Newman was a lifelong fan of the works of Gilbert and Sullivan and wrote several articles about W. S. Gilbert and the Savoy Operas.

He was president of the Canadian Theological Society for some time.

== Honors and awards ==
In 1995 Newman was named a Fellow of the Royal Society of Canada.

He received a Distinguished Alumnus Award of Honor from Brooklyn College in 1988, and was recipient of the 2001 University of Guelph's President's Distinguished Professor Award.

== Death and legacy ==
Newman died in 2007 of cancer at age 59.

The University of Guelph established the Jay Newman Award for Academic Integrity in his memory.

In 2009, the Canadian Theological Society inaugurated the Jay Newman Memorial Lecture in the Philosophy of Religion.

A series of lectures about Gilbert and Sullivan-related topics, known as the Jay Newman Memorial Lectures, were established by the Gilbert and Sullivan Society of New York in 2010. They have been delivered annually or biennially since then, until at least 2021.

== Selected publications ==
- Pious Pro-family Rhetoric: Postures And Paradoxes in Philosophical Perspective (2006) ISBN 0-8204-8667-1
- Biblical Religion and Family Values (2001) ISBN 0-275-97137-6
- Inauthentic Culture and Its Philosophical Critics (1997) ISBN 0-7735-1676-X
- Religion and Technology (1997) ISBN 0-275-95865-5
- Religion vs. Television (1996) ISBN 0-275-95640-7
- On Religious Freedom (1991) ISBN 0-7766-0308-6
- Competition in Religious Life (1989) ISBN 0-88920-989-8
- The Journalist in Plato's Cave (1989) ISBN 0-8386-3349-8
- Fanatics and Hypocrites (1986) ISBN 0-87975-348-X
- The Mental Philosophy of John Henry Newman (1986) ISBN 0-88920-186-2
- Foundations of Religious Tolerance (1982) ISBN 0-8020-5591-5

== See also ==
- American philosophy
- Canadian philosophy
- List of American philosophers
- List of Canadian philosophers
