= T. A. Goudge =

Canadian philosopher and university professor (1910–1999)

T. A. Goudge FRSC
- Born: Thomas Anderson Goudge; January 19, 1910; Halifax, Nova Scotia, Canada
- Died: June 20, 1999 (aged 89); Toronto, Ontario, Canada
- Spouse: Helen Beryl Christilaw (m. 1936)
- Children: Stephen T. Goudge

Academic background
- Education: Dalhousie University; University of Toronto
- Thesis: The Theory of Knowledge in Charles S. Peirce (1937)
- Influences: George Sidney Brett

Academic work
- Discipline: Philosophy
- Institutions: Queen's University; University of Toronto
- Doctoral students: Paul Thagard

Thomas Anderson Goudge FRSC (1910–1999) was a Canadian philosopher and university professor.

== Career ==
He was born on January 19, 1910, in Halifax, Nova Scotia, son of Thomas Norman and Effie (Anderson) Goudge. He graduated from the Halifax Academy in 1927, and studied for a Bachelor of Arts degree in 1931 and a Master of Arts degree in 1932 from Dalhousie University. He obtained his Doctor of Philosophy degree from the University of Toronto in 1937 (he was a student of George Sidney Brett) after having briefly studied from 1936 to 1937 at Harvard University. He married Helen Beryl Christilaw in Blind River, Ontario, on June 23, 1936, and had one son, the jurist Stephen T. Goudge and five grandchildren, Jennifer, Suzanne, Daniel, Timothy and Amy.

He became an interim lecturer on philosophy at Waterloo College in 1934 and later served as a tutor, fellow and then lecturer in philosophy at Queen's University from 1935 to 1938. He lectured in philosophy at Toronto after that, becoming an assistant professor in 1940, an associate professor in 1945 and a full professor in 1949. He also served on the editorial committee of the University of Toronto Quarterly from 1951 on, serving as acting editor in 1955. In 1963, he became Chairman of the Department of Philosophy at Toronto. Goudge was influential in developing the noosphere concept.

He served in the Second World War, joining the Royal Canadian Naval Volunteer Reserve in 1943 as a sub-lieutenant. He was discharged at the end of the war in 1945 with the rank of a Lieutenant-Commander.

He wrote Bergson's Introduction to Metaphysics (1949), The Thought of C. S. Peirce (1950), The Ascent of Life (1961, winning the Governor General's Award) and many articles on philosophy and related subjects. He was a member of the American Philosophical Association, the Mind Association and the Humanities Association of Canada; he also served as President of the Canadian Philosophy Association in 1964 and as President of the Charles S. Peirce Society from 1957 to 1959. He was noted for his passion for oil painting.

He died on June 20, 1999, in Toronto, Ontario.

== Publications ==
- Bergson's Introduction to Metaphysics (1949)
- The Thought of C. S. Peirce (1950)
- The Ascent of Life: A Philosophical Study of the Theory of Evolution (1961)
