= Idealistic Studies =

- Discipline: Philosophy
- Language: English
- Edited by: Jennifer Ann Bates

Publication details
- History: 1971–present
- Publisher: Philosophy Documentation Center (United States)
- Frequency: Triannually

Standard abbreviations
- ISO 4: Ideal. Stud.

Indexing
- ISSN: 0046-8541 (print); 2153-8239 (web)
- LCCN: 73-643035
- OCLC no.: 1786353

Links
- Journal homepage; Online access

Idealistic Studies is a triannual peer-reviewed academic journal covering studies of idealistic themes. Both historical and contemporary statements of idealistic argumentation are published, as are also historico-philosophical studies of idealism. The journal was established in 1971 by Robert N. Beck with the assistance of the Clark University philosophy department. Initially focused on American personalism and post-Kantian idealism, the journal's mission has broadened to include other topics, including historically earlier expressions as well as developments of the late 19th to mid-20th century. The journal has become a venue for a number of philosophical movements that share Idealism in their genealogies, including phenomenology, neo-Kantianism, historicism, hermeneutics, life philosophy, existentialism, and pragmatism. It is published by the Philosophy Documentation Center and the editor-in-chief is Jennifer Bates (Duquesne University).

== Abstracting and indexing ==
The journal is abstracted and indexed in:

- Arts and Humanities Citation Index
- ATLA Religion Database
- Current Contents/Arts & Humanities
- EBSCO databases
- ERIH PLUS
- FRANCIS
- InfoTrac databases
- International Bibliography of Periodical Literature
- International Philosophical Bibliography
- MLA International Bibliography
- The Philosopher's Index
- PhilPapers
- Scopus

== See also ==
- List of philosophy journals
