= John Russon =

American philosopher (born 1960)

- Born: John Edward Russon; 1960 (age 65–66)

Academic background
- Education: University of Toronto (PhD)
- Thesis: Hegel on the Body (1990)
- Doctoral advisor: Graeme Nicholson

Academic work
- Era: Contemporary philosophy
- Region: Western philosophy
- School or tradition: Phenomenology
- Institutions: University of Guelph
- Website: http://johnrusson.com/

John Edward Russon (born 1960) is a Canadian philosopher, working primarily in the tradition of Continental philosophy. In 2006, he was named Presidential Distinguished Professor and, in 2024, Research Leadership Chair at the University of Guelph, and in 2011 he was the Shastri Indo-Canadian Institute's Canadian Lecturer to India.

== Education ==
Russon received his Ph.D. in 1990 from the University of Toronto. His dissertation was entitled Hegel on the Body.

== Research ==
Russon is known for his original philosophical contributions, and also for his scholarly interpretations of G. W. F. Hegel, contemporary Continental philosophy and ancient philosophy.

=== Original philosophy ===
Russon is known as an original philosopher, primarily through his books Human Experience, Bearing Witness to Epiphany, Sites of Exposure, and Adult Life. Leonard Lawlor describes Russon as "one of the few original voices working in Continental Philosophy today", Todd May writes, "John Russon is one of the best phenomenologists in contemporary philosophy," and Peter Gratton writes, "He is our premier phenomenologist." Human Experience, which won the 2005 Broadview Press/Canadian Philosophical Association Book Prize, brought together themes from Hegel, Contemporary Continental Philosophy and Ancient Philosophy, and produced an original interpretation of the development of personal identity; Kirsten Jacobson writes, "This work makes a major contribution to the philosophic comprehension of human nature." In this work Russon argues that the experiences through which we are inaugurated into any distinctive domain of meaning necessarily leave the stamp of their specific (and contingent) character on our subsequent experiences in that domain. He uses this notion to interpret the significance of family experience in the formation of personal identity, and he finds this aspect of our experience to be the key to understanding mental health (and mental illness). Russon's approach to mental health—in particular his interpretation of neurosis—is specially striking for its bringing together of the theme of embodiment that has been prominent in existential phenomenology with the theme of dialectical self-transformation that is prominent in the philosophy of Hegel and with the theme of the "system" of family life that is prominent in the work of such psychologists and family theorists as Salvador Minuchin, R.D. Laing and D.W. Winnicott. This work is also important for its use of these ideas to criticize the "individualist" premises of much political and economic theory, and to develop of a political theory of multiculturalism. His interpretation of the dynamic and transformative role of sexuality (eros) provides an important link between his work and the philosophy of Plato. The importance of sexuality to personal development, and especially its relationship to ethical life and to artistic creativity is further explored in Bearing Witness to Epiphany. Like Human Experience, this work stands out for its emphasis on the way that the important dimensions of our experience are embodied in the most basic material dimensions of our lives—everyday "things" and basic bodily practices—and this work thus offers a new metaphysics of "the thing" and of reality in general, arguing that issues of metaphysics cannot be separated from issues of ethics. Drawing extensively on musical experience, in this work Russon also describes "the music of everyday life", arguing, as Susan Bredlau notes, "that the temporal structure of musical meaning is a powerful analog for the temporal structure of all experiential meaning." His 2017 book, Sites of Exposure, broadens the perspective of these earlier books to address issues of politics and history. Russon analyzes the dynamic process by which we make ourselves at home in a culture, and at the same time come into conflict with other cultures. Investigating this process throughout history, with a special emphasis on ancient Athenian democracy, the history of Islam, and the history of British Empire in Asia, Russon argues for a pluralist multiculturalism as the only viable political direction. He concludes the book with a study of art, which is relevant because it is art that can transform our perspective in a way that opens us to the new possibilities of social and cultural life that are necessary if we are to get beyond simple situations of cultural conflict. He offers original studies of Thomas Cole, Rachel Whiteread, Anselm Kiefer, and Gerhard Richter, among others. His most recent book, Adult Life, continues the study of human development begun in Human Experience and Bearing Witness to Epiphany, and develops an original philosophical account of adulthood. In particular, Russon offers a phenomenological account of the experience of aging and develops an original account of economics and politics as dimensions of intersubjective life that go beyond the sphere of intimate relations studied in detail in his earlier books.

=== History of philosophy ===
In addition to his original philosophical contributions, Russon has also published substantial scholarly work in the history of philosophy. About this, Gregory Kirk writes, however, "A superficial review of Russon's publications presents the image of a scholar who writes two types of works: first, those that engage with the history of philosophy and second, those that presents the author's ideas as an original contributor to the discipline of phenomenology. . . . [I]t becomes clear when one reads Russon's work that there is less differentiating the two kinds of projects than would appear to be the case initially. Indeed, they are components of the same project insofar as they come together to produce the complete application of the method Russon has taken on through a synthesis and application of core ideas from significant figures in the tradition."

==== Hegel ====
Though his doctoral supervisor was the Heidegger scholar Graeme Nicholson, his interpretation of Hegel's philosophy is more often thought of as continuing the tradition of his teacher H. S. Harris (1926–2007), the pre-eminent Hegel scholar in the English-speaking world. Russon's Hegel-interpretation is also distinctive because of its attempt to show the continuity of Hegel's philosophy with the philosophical traditions of phenomenology, existentialism and deconstruction. This interpretation has been developed through many scholarly articles, and especially through three books: The Self and Its Body in Hegel's Phenomenology of Spirit, Reading Hegel's Phenomenology, and Infinite Phenomenology: The Lessons of Hegel's Science of Experience.

==== Contemporary Continental philosophy ====
Russon's philosophical orientation is largely derived from existential phenomenology, and he has published many scholarly articles in this area, especially focusing on the work of Martin Heidegger, Maurice Merleau-Ponty and Jacques Derrida. His most recent works include, "Phenomenology as the Critical Disclosure of the Realities in our Experience," and "Being Present: The Existential Challenges of Remembering and Forgetting." A collection of papers focusing on his original phenomenological work, entitled "John Russon's Phenomenological Encounters," edited by Peter Gratton, was the subject of a recent volume of the journal Symposium: Canadian Journal of Continental Philosophy (Volume 27, number 2, Fall 2023).

==== Ancient philosophy ====
Russon is also known as a scholar of ancient philosophy, especially for his use of the methods of 20th Century European philosophy (phenomenology, hermeneutics and deconstruction) to interpret the texts of Plato and Aristotle. Along with John Sallis, he organized an influential conference at the Pennsylvania State University in 1997 entitled "Retracing the Platonic Text," (the papers from which were published as Retracing the Platonic Text by Northwestern University Press in 2000). This conference helped to inaugurate the growing North American movement to interpret the texts of Greek Philosophy through the lens of Contemporary Continental Philosophy, a movement especially associated with the Ancient Philosophy Society. From 2011-2021, he was the editor of a book series from Northwestern University Press entitled Rereading Ancient Philosophy, which featured books on ancient philosophy that are informed by the insights of continental philosophy. In 2021 he published Politics, Money, and Persuasion: Democracy and Opinion in Plato's Republic, an original interpretation of the Republic focusing on the relation between politics and psychology--"an extended reading of Plato's great work that takes him as our guide to contemporary concerns including neoliberalism and the rise of financial capitalism."

== Teaching ==
Russon has supervised the dissertations of many current professors of philosophy across North America on topics in Plato, Aristotle, Immanuel Kant, Georg Wilhelm Friedrich Hegel, Karl Marx, Edmund Husserl, Martin Heidegger, John Dewey, Maurice Merleau-Ponty and Gilles Deleuze. Russon has held academic appointments at Harvard University, the University of Toronto, Acadia University, the Pennsylvania State University, Stony Brook University, and the University of Guelph. He is also the founder and main organizer of the Toronto Summer Seminar in Philosophy, an annual private seminar for the study of philosophy, held in Toronto, Ontario, Canada.

== Select bibliography ==
=== Books ===
- Politics, Money and Persuasion: Democracy and Opinion in Plato’s Republic, (Bloomington: Indiana University Press, 2021). ISBN 978-0-253-05766-2
- Adult Life: Aging, Responsibility, and the Pursuit of Happiness, (Albany: State University of New York Press, 2020). ISBN 978-1-4384-7950-7
- Sites of Exposure: Art, Politics, and the Nature of Experience, (Bloomington and Indianapolis: Indiana University Press, 2017). ISBN 978-0-253-02925-6
- Infinite Phenomenology: The Lessons of Hegel's Science of Experience, (Evanston: Northwestern University Press, 2016). ISBN 978-0810131910
- Bearing Witness to Epiphany: Persons, Things and the Nature of Erotic Life, (Albany: State University of New York Press, 2009). ISBN 978-1-4384-2504-7
- Reading Hegel's Phenomenology, (Bloomington and Indianapolis: Indiana University Press, 2004). ISBN 978-0-253-21692-2
- Human Experience: Philosophy, Neurosis and the Elements of Everyday Life, (Albany: State University of New York Press, 2003). ISBN 978-0-7914-5754-2
- The Self and Its Body in Hegel's Phenomenology of Spirit, (Toronto: University of Toronto Press, 1997). ISBN 978-0-8020-8482-8

=== Edited books ===
- Teaching in Unequal Societies, co-edited with Siby K. George and Pravesh Jung, (New Delhi: Bloomsbury, 2020). ISBN 978-93-88630-90-0
- Perception and Its Development in Merleau-Ponty's Phenomenology, co-edited with Kirsten Jacobson, (Toronto: University of Toronto Press, 2017). ISBN 978-1487501280
- Reexamining Socrates in the Apology, co-edited with Patricia Fagan, (Evanston: Northwestern University Press, 2009). ISBN 978-0-8101-2587-2
- Retracing the Platonic Text, co-edited with John Sallis, (Evanston: Northwestern University Press, 2000). ISBN 978-0-8101-1703-7
- Hegel and the Tradition: Essays in Honour of H.S. Harris, co-edited with Michael Baur, (Toronto: University of Toronto Press, 1997). ISBN 978-0-8020-0927-2

=== Selected articles in the history and problems of philosophy ===
- "Phenomenology as the Critical Disclosure of the Realities in Our Experience," Symposium, 27 (2023): 134-52.
- "Being Present: The Existential Challenges of Remembering and Forgetting," Graduate Faculty Philosophy Journal, 43 (2022): 321-37.
- "To Account for the Appearances: Phenomenological Method and Existential Change in Aristotle and Plato," Journal of the British Society for Phenomenology, 52 (2021): 155-68.
- "Desire, Recognition and Freedom in Brandom, A Spirit of Trust," Existenz, 15 (2020): 53-60.
- "The Meaning of Health: Human Needs and the Philosophy of Medicine," Anekaant, 10 (2019–20): 35-44.
- "Personality as Equilibrium: Fragility and Plasticity in (Inter)Personal Identity," Phenomenology and the Cognitive Sciences, 16 (2017): 623-35.
- "The Right to Become an Individual," Anekaant, 3 (2015): 17-22.
- "Between Two Intimacies: The Formative Contexts of Adult Individuality," Emotion, Space and Society, 13 (2014): 65-70.
- "Haunted by History: Merleau-Ponty, Hegel, and the Phenomenology of Pain," Journal of Contemporary Thought, (2013): 34-51.
- "The Self as Resolution: Heidegger, Derrida and the Intimacy of the Question of the Meaning of Being," Research in Phenomenology, 38 (2008): 90-110.
- "Temporality and the Future of Philosophy in Hegel," International Philosophical Quarterly, 48(2008): 59-68.
- "Spatiality and Self-Consciousness: Originary Passivity in Kant, Merleau-Ponty and Derrida," Chiasmi International, 9 (2007): 219-232.
- "Reading: Derrida in Hegel's Understanding," Research in Phenomenology, 36 (2006): 181-200.
- "Merleau-Ponty and the New Science of the Soul," Chiasmi International, 8 (2006): 129-138.
- "The Intersubjective Path from Body to Mind," Dialogue, 45 (2006): 307-314.
- "The Virtue of Stoicism: On First Principles in Philosophy and Life," Dialogue, 45 (2006): 347-354.
- "The Elements of Everyday Life: Three Lessons from Ancient Greece," Philosophy in the Contemporary World, 13,2 (2006): 84-90.
- "Eros and Education: Plato’s Transformative Epistemology," Laval Théologique et Philosophique, 56 (2000):113-125.
- "The Metaphysics of Consciousness and the Hermeneutics of Social Life: Hegel’s Phenomenological System," Southern Journal of Philosophy, 36 (1998) :81-101.
- "Self-Consciousness and the Tradition in Aristotle's Psychology," Laval Théologique et Philosophique, 52 (1996): 777-803.
- "Aristotle’s Animative Epistemology," Idealistic Studies, 25 (1995):241-253.
- "Heidegger, Hegel and Ethnicity: The Ritual Basis of Self-Identity," Southern Journal of Philosophy, 33 (1995): 509-532.
- "Hermeneutics and Plato’s Ion," Clio, 24 (1995): 399-418.
- "Embodiment and Responsibility: Merleau-Ponty and the Ontology of Nature," Man and World, 27 (1994): 291-308.
