= Stephen T. Goudge =

Canadian legal professional

Stephen T. Goudge KC is a justice of the Court of Appeal for Ontario, Canada.

== Life and career ==
Goudge is a graduate of University of Toronto Faculty of Law. He was appointed Queen's Counsel in 1982. Goudge was the commissioner of the Goudge Inquiry, which investigated forensic pathology in Ontario in 2007 and 2008.

His father was the philosopher T. A. Goudge.
