= John McCumber =

American philosopher

- Born: July 27, 1945 (age 80); Champaign, Illinois, U.S.

Education
- Education: University of Toronto (PhD)
- Thesis: The Communication of Philosophical Truth in Hegel and Heidegger (1978)
- Doctoral advisor: Graeme Nicholson
- Other advisors: E. L. Fackenheim, H. S. Harris, K. L. Schmitz

Philosophical work
- Era: Contemporary philosophy
- Region: Western philosophy
- School: Continental philosophy
- Institutions: University of California Los Angeles
- Website: https://www.johnmccumber.com/

John McCumber (born July 27, 1945) is an American philosopher. He is distinguished professor and chair of the Department of Germanic Languages at University of California, Los Angeles (UCLA).

== Biography ==
McCumber was born and raised in Champaign, Illinois, where his family worked as grocers. He earned a BA in Philosophy from Pomona College, followed by an MA and a PhD from the University of Toronto. He did his doctoral dissertation on The Communication of Philosophical Truth in Hegel and Heidegger. H. S. Harris, Dan Goldstick, Leonard Boyle, Phillip H. Wiebe, Frank Cunningham, Henry Pietersma were among the dissertation committee members. From 1974 to 1997, McCumber taught philosophy at several institutions, including the University of Toronto, the University of Michigan–Dearborn, The New School for Social Research, and Northwestern University. At Northwestern, he received the prestigious Koldyke Chair, the highest teaching award in the College of Arts and Sciences. However, during his tenure there, a conflict involving Jürgen Habermas led to his departure from the philosophy department—an episode he plans to detail in his forthcoming memoir Vertiginous Instincts.

After leaving philosophy, McCumber joined Northwestern’s German Department. Three years later, he moved to UCLA, where he taught across multiple departments—Classics, Philosophy, Political Science, and Germanic Languages—before settling fully in Germanic Languages once it expanded its offerings in German philosophy. He is now a Distinguished Professor and Chair of that department.

== Selected publications ==
=== Monographs ===
- Poetic Interaction: Language, Freedom, Reason. University of Chicago Press. 19 January 1989. ISBN 978-0-226-55703-8.
- The Company of Words: Hegel, Language, and Systematic Philosophy. Northwestern University Press. 1993-03-04. ISBN 978-0-8101-1082-3.
- On Philosophy. 2013. doi:10.1515/9780804783491. ISBN 978-0-8047-8349-1.
- Understanding Hegel's Mature Critique of Kant. Stanford University Press. 2014. doi:10.2307/j.ctvqsf0xm. ISBN 978-0-8047-8545-7. JSTOR j.ctvqsf0xm.
- The Philosophy Scare. 2016. doi:10.7208/chicago/9780226396415.001.0001. ISBN 978-0-226-39638-5.

=== Articles ===
- "Hegel's Philosophical Languages". Hegel-Studien. 14: 183–196. 1979. JSTOR 26596376.
