= George di Giovanni =

- Born: 1935 (age 90–91)

Education
- Education: University of Toronto (PhD)
- Thesis: Contingency: its foundation in Hegel's logic of becoming (1970)
- Doctoral advisor: Emil Fackenheim

Philosophical work
- Era: Contemporary philosophy
- Region: Western philosophy
- School: German Idealism
- Institutions: University of McGill
- Website: https://george.digiovanni.ca/

George di Giovanni (born 1935) is an emeritus professor of philosophy at McGill University. He specializes in German idealism, nineteenth century philosophy, phenomenology (Husserl and Merleau-Ponty), and philosophy of religion.

== Life and works ==
George di Giovanni completed his classical studies in Rome at the Ginnasio Torquato Tasso, and pursued university studies in Toronto and, periodically, in Germany. He earned his PhD from the University of Toronto in 1970, with a dissertation titled "Contingency: Its Foundation in Hegel’s Logic of Becoming," under the supervision of Emil Fackenheim.

Di Giovanni produced a new translation of Hegel's Science of Logic in 2010, following previous translations by Johnston and Struthers (1929) and A. V. Miller (1969). In addition to his translation, di Giovanni wrote a substantial introduction that, according to John W. Burbidge, provides the best discussion of the development of Hegel's logic during the Jena period. In this introduction, di Giovanni argues that, unlike general or formal logic, Hegel's logic is best interpreted as a form of Kantian transcendental logic. Several reviewers have noted that di Giovanni's translation represents an improvement over previous English versions.

In his work Between Kant and Hegel, co-edited with H. S. Harris, di Giovanni provided translations of selected writings by K. L. Reinhold, G. E. Schulze, S. Maimon, and J. S. Beck, which had a major impact on the anglophone reception of German idealism.

== Selected publications ==
=== Translations ===
- Hegel, Georg Wilhelm Fredrich (2010). Di Giovanni, George (ed.). Georg Wilhelm Friedrich Hegel: The Science of Logic. doi:10.1017/9780511780240. ISBN 978-0-511-78024-0.
- Giovanni, George Di; Harris, Henry Silton (2000). Between Kant and Hegel, Texts in the Development of Post-Kantian Idealism. Hackett. ISBN 978-0-87220-505-5.
- Jacobi, Friedrich Heinrich (1995). Giovanni, George di (ed.). Main Philosophical Writings and the Novel Allwill. doi:10.1515/9780773564121. ISBN 978-0-7735-6412-1.

=== Edited volumes ===
- Karl Leonhard Reinhold and the Enlightenment. Studies in German Idealism. Vol. 9. 2010. doi:10.1007/978-90-481-3227-0. ISBN 978-90-481-3226-3.

=== Monographs ===
- Di Giovanni, George (2021). Hegel and the Challenge of Spinoza: A Study in German Idealism, 1801-1831. doi:10.1017/9781108906999. ISBN 978-1-108-90699-9.
- Di Giovanni, George (2005). Freedom and Religion in Kant and His Immediate Successors: The Vocation of Humankind, 1774-1800. doi:10.1017/CBO9780511498084. ISBN 978-0-521-84451-2.
