= Michael Baur (philosopher) =

Professor of philosophy

- Born: 1963 (age 62–63)

Academic background
- Education: University of Toronto (Ph.D., 1991); Harvard Law School (J.D., 1998)
- Thesis: Hegel and Heidegger as Transcendental Philosophers (1991)
- Doctoral advisor: Rebecca Comay, Graeme Nicholson, Kenneth L. Schmitz

Academic work
- Era: Contemporary philosophy
- Region: Western philosophy
- School or tradition: Continental philosophy
- Institutions: Fordham University
- Main interests: History of philosophy, philosophy of law

Michael Baur (born 1963) is a professor of philosophy and an adjunct professor of law at Fordham University.

Michael Baur's research focuses on philosophers from the German idealist tradition, including Kant, Hegel, and Fichte. He also has published on thinkers in ancient and medieval philosophy, especially Aristotle and Aquinas, and on topics in twentieth century continental philosophy, American pragmatism, and the philosophy of law. He presently serves as the Secretary of the Hegel Society of America, and was series editor of the Cambridge Hegel Translations published by Cambridge University Press. He also is a past President of the Metaphysical Society of America.

== Life and work ==
Michael Baur was born and raised in Los Angeles, California. He went to Loyola High School in Los Angeles, graduating in 1981. In 1985, he obtained his B.A. degree (double-majoring in philosophy and theology) from Loyola Marymount University in Los Angeles. While an undergraduate, he spent his junior year (1983-1984) abroad at Durham University, England, where he studied under E.J. Lowe, David M. Knight, and Sheridan Gilley. He earned his M.A. in Philosophy (1986) and his Ph.D. in philosophy (1991) from the University of Toronto, where he studied under Rebecca Comay, Graeme Nicholson, Kenneth L. Schmitz, H. S. Harris, Joseph Owens, and Thomas Langan. With the help of a Fulbright scholarship, he spent the 1988-1989 academic year at the University of Heidelberg, where he studied under Hans-Georg Gadamer, Hans-Friedrich Fulda, and Günter Figal. He taught at the Catholic University of America in Washington, DC, from 1991 to 1995. He earned a J.D. from Harvard Law School in 1998. He has been teaching at Fordham University since 1998.

== Books ==
- Baur, Michael (2015-05-01). G. W. F. Hegel: Key Concepts (1 ed.). Routledge. doi:10.4324/9781315744292. ISBN 978-1-315-74429-2.
- Houlgate, Stephen; Baur, Michael, eds. (2011-04-08). A Companion to Hegel (1 ed.). Wiley. doi:10.1002/9781444397161. ISBN 978-1-4051-7076-5.
- "Hegel and the Tradition: Essays in Honour of H.S. Harris", Hegel and the Tradition, University of Toronto Press, 1998-01-21, doi:10.3138/9781442675674, ISBN 978-1-4426-7567-4
- The Emergence of German Idealism. Catholic University of America Press. 1999. doi:10.2307/j.ctt21pxmwh. ISBN 978-0-8132-3050-4.

== Translations ==
- Hegel, Georg Wilhelm Fredrich (2018). Pinkard, Terry; Baur, Michael (eds.). Georg Wilhelm Friedrich Hegel: The Phenomenology of Spirit. Cambridge Hegel Translations. Translated by Pinkard, Terry; Baur, Michael. Cambridge: Cambridge University Press. doi:10.1017/9781139050494. ISBN 978-0-521-85579-2.
- Fichte, Johann Gottlieb (2000). Foundations of natural right : according to the Principles of the Wissenschaftslehre. Internet Archive. Cambridge; New York : Cambridge University Press. ISBN 978-0-521-57591-1.
