= 1961 Governor General's Awards =

Canadian literary award

Each winner of the 1961 Governor General's Awards for Literary Merit was selected by a panel of judges administered by the Canada Council for the Arts.

== Winners ==
=== English Language ===
- Fiction: Malcolm Lowry, Hear Us O Lord from Heaven Thy Dwelling Place
- Poetry or Drama: Robert Finch, Acis in Oxford
- Non-Fiction: T. A. Goudge, The Ascent of Life

=== French Language ===
- Fiction: Yves Thériault, Ashini
- Non-Fiction: Jean Le Moyne, Convergences
