= Murray Clarke =

Canadian philosopher

Murray Clarke is a Professor of Philosophy at Concordia University in Montreal, Quebec, Canada. He previously earned his Ph.D. from the University of Western Ontario, now at Concordia, he has served twice as Chair of the Philosophy Department and as Graduate Program Director. specializing in Cognitive Science, Philosophy of Mind, and Naturalized Epistemology. He is the author of Reconstructing Reason and Representation.

== Research ==
Clarke research focuses on tracking theories of knowledge, the impact of empirical psychology on epistemology, the nature of rationality, inferential capacities, and the origin of concepts within our cognitive architecture. He is a member of the Groupe de recherche interuniversitaire sur la normativité (GRIN), funded by the Fonds de recherche du Québec – Société et culture (FQRSC).

== Publications ==
- "Reconstructing Reason and Representation" (2004) MIT Press

Honorable Mention, 2005, for the American Psychological Association's William James Prize
review symposium (Philosophiques, 34:2 (2007) 353–492)

== See also ==
- List of people from Montreal
