= Emil Fackenheim =

German-born Canadian rabbi and philosopher (1916–2003)

Emil Ludwig Fackenheim
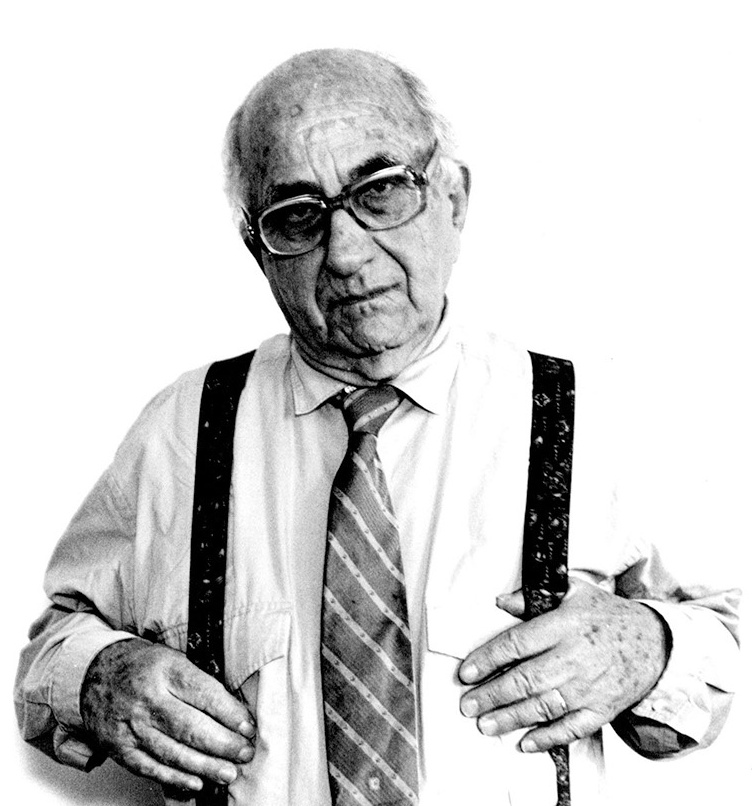
- Fackenheim in 1982
- Born: 22 June 1917; Halle/Saale, Province of Saxony, German Empire
- Died: 19 September 2003 (aged 87); Jerusalem, Israel

Academic background
- Thesis: 'Substance' and 'Perseity' in Medieval Arabic Philosophy, with Introductory Chapters on Aristotle, Plotinus and Proclus (1945)

Academic work
- Era: 20th-century philosophy
- Region: Western philosophy
- School or tradition: Continental philosophy
- Notable students: Graeme Nicholson, George di Giovanni, John W. Burbidge, John McCumber
- Main interests: The Holocaust; Radical Evil; Israel; Tikkun Olam
- Notable ideas: 614th Commandment

Emil Ludwig Fackenheim (Hebrew: עמיל לודוויג פאקנהיים; 22 June 1916 – 19 September 2003) was a Jewish philosopher and Reform rabbi.

Born in Halle, Germany, he was arrested by Nazis on the night of 9 November 1938, known as Kristallnacht. Briefly interned at the Sachsenhausen concentration camp (1938–1939), he escaped with his younger brother Wolfgang to Great Britain, where his parents later joined him. Emil's older brother Ernst-Alexander, who refused to leave Germany, was killed in the Holocaust.

== Early life and education ==
Held by the British as an enemy alien after the outbreak of World War II, Fackenheim was sent to Canada in 1940, where he was interned at a remote internment camp near Sherbrooke, Quebec. He was freed afterward and served as the Interim Rabbi at Temple Anshe Shalom in Hamilton, Ontario, from 1943 to 1948. After this he enrolled in the graduate philosophy department of the University of Toronto and received a PhD from the University of Toronto with a dissertation on medieval Arabic philosophy (1945) and became Professor of Philosophy (1948–1984). He was among the original editorial advisors of the scholarly journal Dionysius. In 1971, he received an honorary doctorate from Sir George Williams University, which later became Concordia University.

Fackenheim researched the relationship of the Jews with God, believing that the Holocaust must be understood as an imperative requiring Jews to carry on Jewish existence and the survival of the State of Israel. He emigrated to Israel in 1984.

According to a family friend, "He was always saying that continuing Jewish life and denying Hitler a posthumous victory was the 614th law," referring to the 613 mitzvot given to the Jews in the Torah.

== Background ==
Emil Fackenheim created this concept of the "614th commandment" (or "614th mitzvah"). The "614th Commandment" can be interpreted as a moral imperative that Jews not use the facts of the Holocaust to give up on God, Judaism or—in the case of secular Jews as well—on the continuing survival of the Jewish people, thereby giving Hitler a "posthumous victory". The meaning of this imperative has been the subject of serious dialogue both within and beyond the Jewish community. Opposition to the goals of Hitler is a moral touchstone that has implications for several sensitive issues.

=== A new moral imperative ===
... we are, first, commanded to survive as Jews, lest the Jewish people perish. We are commanded, secondly, to remember in our very guts and bones the martyrs of the Holocaust, lest their memory perish. We are forbidden, thirdly, to deny or despair of God, however much we may have to contend with him or with belief in him, lest Judaism perish. We are forbidden, finally, to despair of the world as the place which is to become the kingdom of God, lest we help make it a meaningless place in which God is dead or irrelevant and everything is permitted. To abandon any of these imperatives, in response to Hitler's victory at Auschwitz, would be to hand him yet other, posthumous victories.

— Emil Fackenheim, To mend the world, p. 213

Traditional Jewish law contains 613 mitzvot (commandments) as compiled by Maimonides. These laws—365 of which are negative (e.g. "Thou shalt not...") and 248 of which are positive—cover all aspects of life. Fackenheim asserted that tradition could not anticipate the Holocaust, so one more law, a 614th Commandment, became necessary. "Thou shalt not hand Hitler posthumous victories. To despair of the God of Israel is to continue Hitler's work for him." This proposes that people of Jewish heritage have a moral obligation to observe their faith and thus frustrate Hitler's goal of eliminating Judaism from the earth.

Fackenheim came to this conclusion slowly. A professor of philosophy at the University of Toronto and a Reform rabbi, he did not become a Zionist until 1967, when his reaction to the Holocaust and its implications for Jewish law crystallized:

It was at a meeting, just before the Six-Day War. It was a meeting in New York, and I had to make a speech. Before that, the Holocaust had never been essential to my ideology. However, when the chairman said, 'You've got to face it,' I had to face it. I said the most important thing I ever said.

=== Implications ===
==== Zionism ====
Fackenheim applied this reasoning to the state of Israel and its Law of Return as a necessity to prevent a second Holocaust. Had a Jewish state existed in the 1930s, it could have accepted Jewish refugees and rescued large numbers of people. This opinion carries clout with most Jewish people although the specifics of how to apply it in contemporary politics is a subject of debate. Boris Shusteff invokes it in a conservative opposition to Israeli withdrawal from settlements.

Despite the explicit connection to Zionism, few sources mention Hitler and posthumous victories in reference to Islam. Christian Palestinian Sami Aldeeb of the Swiss Institute of Comparative Law in Lausanne paraphrases it ironically in a defense of Palestinian interests. Where a form of it appears in the Asia Times as part of a quote from Robert Novak, the cultural resonance appears to go unnoticed.

==== Holocaust remembrance ====
The concept encounters broad acceptance in connection with Holocaust remembrance. In the late twentieth century, efforts to document the memories of remaining Holocaust survivors echoed the notion that preserving these facts for future generations was a way to keep Hitler and his ideas in the grave. A guide for British primary school teachers gives the concept in a guide for informing children about the Holocaust. Richard A. Cohen of the University of North Carolina at Charlotte cites it in an essay, "The Holocaust is a Christian Issue."

==== Caution against antisemitism ====
The phrase finds resonance within Christian communities as a rebuke against antisemitism. Methodist minister Rev. Robert A. Hill quotes Fackenheim in a sermon with this context:

...the fact is that Christianity has been pervasively guilty of latent and patent anti-Semitism and the Gospel of John has been one of its sources. We have and can learn from this failure, by carefully monitoring our use of religious language...and our Jewish brothers and sisters can teach us to continue, with Jacob, to wrestle with God.

==== Conversion to other religions ====
Within the broader context of religious tolerance, this concept applies to the sensitive subjects of conversion and intermarriage. Gregory Baum, a German-born Catholic theologian and Professor Emeritus in Religious Studies at McGill University in Montreal, expresses the effect of this concept on Christian views toward conversion. From the perspective of most Christian faiths, whose doctrines normally advocate conversion of nonbelievers, this represents a deep respect for Fackenheim's concept:

After Auschwitz the Christian churches no longer wish to convert the Jews. While they may not be sure of the theological grounds that dispense them from this mission, the churches have become aware that asking the Jews to become Christians is a spiritual way of blotting them out of existence and thus only reinforces the effects of the Holocaust.

Fackenheim's affirmation of his Jewish heritage, although embraced by many other Holocaust survivors, was by no means universal. Physicist Lise Meitner had been born and brought up Jewish. She rejected newspaper attempts to characterize her as a Jew following the bombing of Hiroshima when the press learned that she had been the first scientist to recognize nuclear fission. Decades before Hitler rose to power she had become a Lutheran. Although the Nazis stole her savings and ruined her career she refused to work on the bomb or let Hitler define her identity.

=== Criticism ===
Rabbi Toba Spitzer finds this idea compelling yet incomplete. In a Passover essay for SocialAction.com she addresses it sympathetically before embracing the Passover tradition and its Seder ritual as a more meaningful story:

...of a people born in slavery, freed by their God, and taken on a transformational journey. It is the story of the steps taken towards becoming a community bound by a holy covenant, where social relationships are defined by the Godly principles of tzedek and chesed, justice and love.

Rabbi Marc Gellman rejects it outright in a 2005 Newsweek column:

I am Jewish because my mother is Jewish, and, more importantly, because I believe Judaism is loving, just, joyous, hopeful and true. I am not Jewish, and I did not teach my children or my students to be Jewish, just to spite Hitler.

The same criticism was formulated by Jewish philosopher Michael Wyschogrod in his 1971 review of God's Presence in History. Wyschogrod questioned the value of a definition of Judaism that merely inverts antisemitism into a bigoted "semitism." The uniqueness of Auschwitz as a historical event, moreover, is a dubious distinction. "It is necessary to recognize that, from any universally humanistic framework, the destruction of European Jewry is one notable chapter in the long record of man's inhumanity against man." Not satisfied with criticism, however, Wyschogrod offered a traditional explanation of the Jewish claim to uniqueness and chosenness formulated in positive terms.

The fate of Israel is of central concern because Israel is the elect people of God through whom God's redemptive work is done in the world. However tragic human suffering is on the human plane, what happens to Israel is directly tied to its role as that nation to which God attaches His name and through which He will redeem man. He who strikes Israel, therefore, engages himself in battle with God and it is for this reason that the history of Israel is the fulcrum of human history. The suffering of others must, therefore, be seen in the light of Israel's suffering. The travail of man is not abandoned, precisely because Israel suffers and, thereby, God's presence is drawn into human history and redemption enters the horizon of human existence.

Focusing not on Fackenheim's conception of Jewish identity but on Zionism, renowned scholar Daniel Shoag presents a critique of this view from within the Jewish community in The Harvard Israel Review:

While Fackenheim's sentiments about the need for Jewish self-reliance in the form of a Jewish state are immensely popular, Fackenheim fails to locate a religious or divine source for his moral imperative. For Fackenheim, self-defense, and its manifestation in Zionism, are not religious values but rather things that precede religious value or stand outside of it. Thus Fackenheim locates the significance of the Jewish State in the Holocaust rather than in traditional Judaism...

Perhaps the strongest rejection of Fackenheim's idea of the 614th commandment comes from Rabbi Harold M. Schulweiss:

We abuse the Holocaust when it becomes a cudgel against others who have their claims of suffering. The Shoah must not be misused in the contest of one-downsmanship with other victims of brutality. ... The Shoah has become our instant raison d'etre, the short-cut answer to the penetrating questions of our children: 'Why should I not marry out of the faith? Why should I join a synagogue? Why should I support Israel? Why should I be Jewish?' We have relied on a singular imperative: 'Thou shalt not give Hitler a posthumous victory.' That answer will not work. To live in spite, to say 'no' to Hitler is a far cry from living 'yes' to Judaism.

Rabbi Michael Goldberg has developed this sort of criticism in his book Why Should the Jews Survive?: Looking Past the Holocaust Toward a Jewish Future.

== Awards ==
- 1969: National Jewish Book Award in the Jewish Thought category for Quest for Past and Future

== Bibliography ==
- Paths To Jewish Belief: A Systematic Introduction (1960)
- Metaphysics and Historicity (1961)
- The Religious Dimension in Hegel's Thought (1967)
- Quest for Past and Future; Essays in Jewish Theology (1968)
- God's Presence in History: Jewish Affirmations and Philosophical Reflections (1970)
- The Human Condition After Auschwitz: a Jewish Testimony a Generation After (1971)
- Encounters Between Judaism and Modern Philosophy: a Preface to Future Jewish Thought (1973)
- From Bergen-Belsen to Jerusalem : contemporary implications of the holocaust (1975)
- The Jewish return into history: reflections in the age of Auschwitz and a New Jerusalem (1978)
- To Mend the World: Foundations of Future Jewish Thought (1982)
- The Jewish Thought of Emil Fackenheim: A Reader (1987)
- What is Judaism? An Interpretation for the Present Age (1988)
- The Jewish Bible After the Holocaust (1991)
- To Mend the World: Foundations of Post-Holocaust Jewish Thought (Second Edition, added preface, and lecture) (1994)
- Jewish Philosophers and Jewish Philosophy (1996)
- The God Within: Kant, Schelling and Historicity (1996)
- An Epitaph for German Judaism: From Halle to Jerusalem (Fackenheim's Autobiography) (2007, University of Wisconsin Press)

== See also ==
- Conversion to Judaism
- Georg Wilhelm Friedrich Hegel
- Who is a Jew?
