= S. Donna Geernaert =

Canadian university chancellor

- Scientific career
- Institutions: Mount Saint Vincent University

S. Donna Geernaert is the chancellor of Mount Saint Vincent University located in Halifax, Nova Scotia.
