= Jacques M. Chevalier =

Canadian anthropologist and philosopher

- Born: May 10, 1949 (age 77); Gatineau, Quebec, Canada
- Known for: Contributions to participatory action research; Latin American anthropology; semiotics; moral philosophy
- Parent: François Chevalier
- Awards: Carleton University Scholarly Achievement Award (1979, 1981, 1983, 1993, 2002)

Academic background
- Education: B.Ph (Philosophy), University of Ottawa (1969); B.A. Honours (Anthropology), Carleton University (1971); Ph.D. (Social Anthropology), University of Edinburgh (1977)
- Thesis: (1977)

Jacques M. Chevalier (born May 10, 1949) is a Canadian anthropologist and philosopher. He is Chancellor's Professor Emeritus at Carleton University and is primarily known for his contributions to participatory action research, Latin American anthropology, semiotics, and moral philosophy.

== Biography ==
Jacques M. Chevalier was born on 10 May 1949 in Hull (now Gatineau), Québec. His father, the Honourable François Chevalier, was a member of the Order of Canada and served on the Quebec Superior Court and the Quebec Court of Appeal.

Jacques M. Chevalier's academic career began in philosophy with a B.Ph from the University of Ottawa in 1969, followed by an Honours B.A. in anthropology from Carleton University in 1971. Chevalier completed his Ph.D. in Social Anthropology at the University of Edinburgh in 1977. He then joined the Department of Sociology and Anthropology at Carleton (Ottawa), where he taught until 2012. He was appointed Chancellor's Professor in 2003 and later named Chancellor's Professor Emeritus in recognition of his outstanding contributions to teaching, research, and service. He was honoured with Carleton's Scholarly Achievement Award on five occasions (1979, 1981, 1983, 1993, 2002).

== Works ==
=== Latin American Anthropology ===
His first monograph, Civilization and the Stolen Gift: Capital, Kin, and Cult in Eastern Peru (1982), with a preface by political theorist Ernesto Laclau, sparked the Chevalier–Taussig debate, challenging prevailing explanations of underdevelopment and obstacles to modernization in Latin America. Fieldwork in Latin America also produced A Land Without Gods: Process Theory, Maldevelopment and the Mexican Nahuas, coauthored with Daniel Buckles (1995). It engages with the complex relations between culture, politics, and livelihood issues among indigenous people.

In 1990, Chevalier co-founded the Sierra de Santa Marta Project in Veracruz, Mexico, funded by the International Development Research Centre. The action-research project contributed to the creation of the Tuxtlas Biosphere Reserve (1998), an area now preserved within UNESCO's biosphere network.

=== Symbolic analysis and sign theory ===
Chevalier's scholarship encompasses in-depth semiotic studies of literature, biblical texts and indigenous belief systems. In Semiotics, Romanticism and the Scriptures (1990), he offers a detailed reading of Longfellow's poem Evangeline and its biblical evocations, using a post-structuralist approach to sign theory and symbolism. A Postmodern Revelation: Signs of Astrology and the Apocalypse (1997) provides a comprehensive analysis of the New Testament's Book of Revelation, contextualizing it within the broader history of astrology. The Hot and the Cold: Ills of Humans and Maize in Native Mexico (2002) turns to the study of Nahua rituals and mythology and the conceptions of human and plant health and illness in native communities. In The 3D Mind (2002), Chevalier further elaborates on his contribution to semiotics, with three volumes on the linkages between brain studies and the workings of language and consciousness.

=== Participatory Action Research ===
Chevalier is particularly renowned for his leadership in developing and advancing Participatory Action Research (PAR) scholarship and practice. PAR formalizes a research and problem-solving process that prioritizes the idea of working with people in a given context, not ‘on’ or ‘for’ them.

In collaboration with Daniel Buckles and Michelle Bourassa, he co-founded the SAS2 initiative, a global network designed to promote collaborative inquiry and dialogue across disciplines and social divides. This initiative produced two cornerstone publications: SAS2: A Guide to Collaborative Inquiry and Social Engagement (2008), and Participatory Action Research: Theory and Methods for Engaged Inquiry (2013, 2nd ed. 2019). The Routledge book received positive reviews for its theoretical insights into designing bespoke research processes for specific locations, people, and disciplines. The second edition was cited over 700 times in its first year of publication, rising to 1,900 by 2025. Chevalier's contributions to the foundations and “skillful means” of participatory action research (PAR) are highlighted in La recherche-action, enjeux relationnels et lieux de vie (Nouvelle revue de psychosociologie, 2025).

Chevalier's feasibility study on applying PAR to Lyme disease research examines the extent to which conditions required for participatory methods to impact public health are met in Canada. His work inspired academic research aimed at helping Bangladeshi farmers become less dependent on tobacco production and supporting the Katkari people of India fighting eviction from their villages.

Chevalier has delivered numerous keynote presentations on the theoretical, methodological, and pedagogical implications of engaged research, starting with his presentation on “Stakeholders Doing Class Analysis” at the United Nations University Centre in Tokyo (2001). He shared his views on “L’altermondialisme des savoirs” at the Congrès de l'Association Internationale de Pédagogie Universitaire (Quebec, 2012), followed by his keynote presentation on “Les sciences participatives” at Marciac, as part of the “Mission sur les sciences participatives" led by INRA (2015). He also delivered the opening address, “Repenser ensemble le vivre ensemble”, at Les Colloques de Cerisy (Vers une nouvelle alliance sciences‑sociétés Revisiter les rapports entre connaissances et action, in France, (2023).

=== History of moral philosophy ===
Chevalier's The Ethics of Courage (2023) is a comprehensive two-volume study of the history of moral courage from ancient Greece to the Middle Ages (Volume 1) and from early modernity to the global age (Volume 2). He outlined his views on the subject in his inaugural address, “Courage: The elephant in the Room”, delivered at the 6th Lisbon Winter School for the Study of Communication (January 2026).
