= Donald D. Evans =

Canadian philosopher (1927–2018)

Donald Dwight Evans (September 21, 1927 – January 5, 2018) was a Canadian educator, psychotherapist, and spiritual counsellor.

Born in Thunder Bay, Ontario, Evans obtained a B.A. from the University of Toronto in 1950, following which he earned a B.Phil. from Oxford University and a B.D. from McGill University. He was ordained as a pastor in the United Church of Canada in 1955. He was a professor of divinity at the University of Toronto from 1960 to 1964 (during which time he received a D.Phil. from Oxford), an associate professor of philosophy from 1964 to 1968, and full professor from 1968 until 1993.

In his early work, his ‘’The Logic of Self-Involvement’’ (1963), Evans finds the meaning of religion within language. In his later works, his 1980 ‘’Faith, Authenticity, and Morality’’ and his 1981 ‘’Struggle and Fulfillment,’’ Evans finds the basis of religious belief in religious experience. He died on January 5, 2018, aged 90.

== Indignant compassion ==
‘’’Indignant compassion’’’ is experienced by both believers and non-believers in God. It is a common identification with the suffering of others. The prominent idea is that both believers and non-believers grieve and rebel against suffering. To explain this term, Evans gives two fictional atheists--Dostoievsky‘s Ivan Karamazov and Camus‘s Dr. Bernard Rieux--as examples of those whose “compassion is compounded with a sense of outrage and revulsion that nature and men should inflict mental and physical torture on human beings.” Evans also quotes D. M. Mackinnon‘s ‘’Christian Faith and Communist Faith’’ (1953) “the man who revolts, determined somehow to affirm in this most desperate situation that God did not so make the world, is met by the mystery of God’s own revolt against the world He made.” According to Evans, a belief in a God of ‘’’indignant compassion’’’ means a belief in a God who suffers, which is what Bonhoeffer illustrates when—during his incarceration in a Nazi prison—he wrote “Christians stand by God in his hour of grieving.”

== Quotes ==
The purpose of philosophical and religious reflection is to help us lead good lives

== Works ==
- ‘’Faith, Authenticity, and Morality’’, Toronto Press, 1980, 268 pages
- ‘’Struggle and Fulfillment: the Inner Dynamics of Religion and Morality’’, Fortress Press, 1981 (Collins, 1979), 238 pages

Logic of Self-involvement: A Philosophical Study of Everyday Language with Special Reference to the Christian Use of Language about God as Creator, 1963, SCM Press, In Series edited by Ian Ramsey and John McIntyre

- Chapter 6 “Differences between scientific and religious assertions” (pp. 101–133) in ‘’Science and Religion: New Perspectives on the Dialogue’’, Editor Ian Barbour, Harper & Row, 1968

== See also ==
- List of science and religion scholars
