= Kenneth R. Westphal =

American scholar

- Born: Kenneth Robert Westphal; December 20, 1955 (age 70); Evanston, Illinois, U.S.
- Awards: George Armstrong Kelly Prize (1994)

Education
- Education: University of Illinois Urbana-Champaign (BA, 1977); University of Wisconsin–Madison (MA, 1981; PhD, 1986)
- Thesis: Nietzsche on Truth and Knowledge (Realism, Perspectivism, Interpretation, Epistemology, Skepticism) (1986)
- Doctoral advisor: Donald W. Crawford

Philosophical work
- Era: Contemporary philosophy
- Region: Western philosophy
- School: German idealism
- Institutions: Purdue University; University of New Hampshire; University of East Anglia; University of Kent; Boğaziçi University
- Main interests: Epistemology; Ethics; Political philosophy; History of philosophy

Kenneth Robert Westphal (born December 20, 1955) is an American philosopher who is a professor emeritus of philosophy at the Academia Europaea. From 2014 to 2021 he was professor of philosophy at Boğaziçi University, Istanbul.

== Education ==
Westphal earned a B.A. in social theory from the University of Illinois Urbana–Champaign in 1977. Following this, he pursued his graduate studies in philosophy, entering University of Wisconsin–Madison in 1978, earning an M.A. in 1981 and a Ph.D. in 1986 with the dissertation "Nietzsche on Truth and Knowledge (Realism, Perspectivism, Interpretation, Epistemology, Skepticism)". During his doctoral studies, Westphal also studied at the Freie Universität Berlin (1983–84) and the Ohio State University (1984–85).

== Honors and awards ==
Westphal was awarded the George Armstrong Kelly Prize for his article "Kant on the State, Law, and Obedience to Authority in the Alleged "Anti-Revolutionary" Writings" by the Conference for the Study of Political Thought, when the former was published by the Journal of Philosophical Research in 1992.

== Publications ==
=== Monographs ===
- Westphal, Kenneth R. (2021). Kant's Transcendental Deduction of the Categories: Critical Re-Examination, Elucidation & Corroboration: Critical Re-Examination, Elucidation and Corroboration. Helsinki University Press. JSTOR j.ctv1qp9h87.
- Westphal, Kenneth R. (2004). Kant's Transcendental Proof of Realism. doi:10.1017/CBO9780511584497. ISBN 978-0-521-83373-8.
- Hegel's Epistemology: A Philosophical Introduction to the Phenomenology of Spirit. Hackett. 2003. ISBN 978-0-87220-646-5.
- Hegel, Hume und die Identität wahrnehmbarer Dinge: Historisch-kritische Analyse zum Kapitel Wahrnehmung in der Phänomenologie von 1807. V. Klostermann. 31 December 1997. ISBN 978-3-465-02970-0.
- Westphal, Kenneth R. (1989). Hegel's Epistemological Realism. doi:10.1007/978-94-009-2342-3. ISBN 978-94-010-7554-1.

=== Editorials ===
- Westphal, Kenneth R., ed. (2009). The Blackwell Guide to Hegel's Phenomenology of Spirit. doi:10.1002/9781444306224. ISBN 978-1-4443-0622-4.
- Westphal, Kenneth R., ed. (2014). Realism, Science, and Pragmatism. doi:10.4324/9781315779515. ISBN 978-1-317-69970-5.

=== Articles ===
- Westphal, Kenneth R. (2016). "Hegel, Natural Law & Moral Constructivism". The Owl of Minerva. 48 (1/2): 1–44. doi:10.5840/owl201752719.
- Westphal, Kenneth R. (2009). "Mutual Recognition and Rational Justification in Hegel's Phenomenology of Spirit". Dialogue: Canadian Philosophical Review / Revue canadienne de philosophie. 48 (4): 753–799. doi:10.1017/S0012217309990412. ISSN 1759-0949.
- Westphal, Kenneth R. (2008). "Force, Understanding and Ontology". Bulletin of the Hegel Society of Great Britain. 29 (1–2): 1–29. doi:10.1017/S0263523200000756.
- Westphal, Kenneth R. (2006). "How Does Kant Prove That We Perceive, and Not Merely Imagine, Physical Objects?". The Review of Metaphysics. 59 (4): 781–806. ISSN 0034-6632. JSTOR 20130701.
- Westphal, Kenneth R. (1992). "Kant on the State, Law, and Obedience to Authority in the Alleged 'Anti-Revolutionary' Writings". Journal of Philosophical Research. 17: 383–426. doi:10.5840/jpr_1992_5. ISSN 1053-8364.
