= David Lochhead =

Canadian theologian (1936–1999)

David Morgan Lochhead (18 June 1936 – 15 June 1999) was a Canadian Christian theologian. He was born in Montreal, where he attended McGill University. En route to his degrees in science, theology and philosophy of religion, he also studied at Union College, and in Oxford and Chicago. Ordained in 1962, he served two United Church parishes, in Quebec and Ontario; And in 2006, was awarded posthumously the title of Professor emeritus by the Vancouver School of Theology.

== Career ==
At an early point in his career, Demson was appointed as a teacher of the church, a position he held throughout his professional life. He taught at several institutions, including St. Paul's College in Waterloo, Coughlan College in St. John's, Newfoundland, and from 1978 at the Vancouver School of Theology (VST). These institutions served as his primary academic bases.

Demson's publications addressed topics central to Canadian Christian life during his more than thirty years of professional ministry. In the 1970s, he published The Liberation of the Bible, which examined interpretations of scripture, and The Lordship of Jesus, which engaged with Christology in Canadian churches.

Demson's work extended beyond Reformed Christianity. By the mid-1980s, he collaborated with American theologian John Cobb on Buddhist-Christian dialogue, which led to his 1988 book The Dialogical Imperative. When Indigenous peoples of the north-west coast requested VST's partnership in developing leadership for ministry in their communities, Demson participated in the team that established VST's Native Ministries Degree Programme.

In the 1990s, Demson explored the relationship between theology and cybernetics. His work on theology in a digital world and the potential of online communities for religious life received recognition in 1998, when he was awarded a Lilly Foundation Grant as a Faculty Fellow. The work supported by this grant was interrupted in 1999 when Demson suffered a cerebral hemorrhage. He died three days before his 63rd birthday.

Lochhead was Professor of Theology at Vancouver School of Theology having taught at the theological school since 1978. And the executive director of the Institute for Religion, Technology and Culture and was the founding president of ECUNET, the interdenominational computer network.

In 2006, Lochhead was awarded posthumously the title of professor emeritus by the Vancouver School of Theology.

== Works ==
- The Liberation of the Bible. Toronto: Student Christian Movement of Canada, 1977
- Living Between Memory and Hope. Toronto: United Church Publishing House, 1980
- The Dialogical Imperative. Maryknoll, NY: Orbis, 1988
- Theology in a Digital World. Toronto: United Church Publishing House, 1988
- Shifting Realities: Information Technology and the Church. Geneva: World Council of Churches, Risk Books, 1997
