= Henry Silton Harris =

British-Canadian philosopher

- Born: Henry Silton Harris; 11 April 1926; Brighton, England
- Died: 13 March 2007 (aged 80); Vancouver, British Columbia, Canada

Education
- Education: Oxford University; University of Illinois
- Thesis: The Social Philosophy of Giovanni Gentile (1954)
- Doctoral advisor: Max Harold Fisch

Philosophical work
- Era: Contemporary philosophy
- Region: Western philosophy
- School: Continental philosophy
- Institutions: University of Illinois; Ohio State University; York University
- Notable students: John McCumber
- Main interests: Hegel, Giovanni Gentile, German philosophy, philosophy and literature
- Notable ideas
- Military service
- Allegiance: United Kingdom
- Branch: Home Guard; British Army
- Service years: 1940-45
- Rank: Private
- Units: East Sussex Home Guard; Royal Corps of Signals
- Conflicts: Second World War

Henry Silton Harris (11 April 1926 – 13 March 2007), who published as H. S. Harris, was a British-Canadian philosopher, having been a Distinguished Research Professor at York University.

He is best known for his work on the intellectual development of G. W. F. Hegel and for his writings and commentary upon The Phenomenology of Spirit.

== Biography ==
Henry Harris was born in Brighton, England, to Henry and Amy Harris. He was raised at Perching Manor in Fulking, where his father had farmed since 1920. During the Second World War, his father, a WW1 veteran, was the officer in command of the Fulking platoon of the East Sussex Home Guard, and Henry jr. served as a Private until 1944 when he joined the Royal Signals. His grandfather was Henry Harris.

Harris received a BA (1949) in classics and philosophy from University of Oxford, and an MA (1952) and PhD (1954) at University of Illinois Urbana-Champaign. He taught at the University of Illinois and Ohio State University and, in 1962, joined York University where he was eventually made Distinguished Research Professor in 1984.

He was Glendon College's Academic Dean from 1967 to 1969, elected a Fellow in Royal Society of Canada in 1988 and was also given an Honorary Doctor of Letters from York in 2001. In 2001, he was also inducted into York University's Founders' Honour Society in recognition of his contribution to York's early development.

Harris was known for his collegiality, and he was a frequent collaborator on a variety of translation projects. He was "the keystone" of a group who gathered at Trinity College, Toronto, to translate the works of Georg Wilhelm Friedrich Hegel.

He was also Honorary President of the Hegel Society of Great Britain.

At the time of his death, Harris was working on manuscripts on pre-Platonic philosophy, Plato, Dante, Goethe, Blake, and Hegel—and a large collection of articles on philosophy and literature.

== Hegel scholarship ==
Although Harris came to Hegel late in his career, once he did "his attention to detail was exceptional": "Hegel’s Development: Toward the Sunlight 1770–1801 explored every text from Hegel’s early years, and showed both their internal logic but also how each one contributed to the need to push further. It has become the standard reference work on that period of Hegel’s life." The same would be true of its sequel, Hegel’s Development: Night Thoughts (Jena 1801–1806).

Harris's next major project, a two-volume commentary on The Phenomenology of Spirit, Hegel's Ladder (vol. 1, The Pilgrimage of Reason, and vol. 2, The Odyssey of Spirit), was likewise received with critical acclaim. Introducing a collection of essays on the Phenomenology dedicated to H. S. Harris, Kenneth R. Westphal writes,

Hegel's Ladder is a landmark. Hegel's texts are notoriously rich, compressed, systematic, and rife with allusions. Harris identified a wealth of Hegel's profuse sources and shows why and how Hegel used them; his commentary demonstrates the decompression and detailed explication Hegel's text deserves and requires.

In the words of George di Giovanni, "for wealth of historical detail and accuracy of insight, there is nothing comparable in any language to this latest commentary of the Phenomenology of Spirit."

By his own account, Harris's effort to "make Hegel speak English" was greatly indebted to his ongoing engagement with the philosophy of David Hume.
