= George Sidney Brett =

George Sidney Brett FRSC (5 August 1879 Briton Ferry, Wales – 27 October 1944 Toronto, Ontario, Canada) was a British-Canadian psychologist.

== Work ==
Brett's main contribution to psychology was his three-volume History of Psychology (1912–1921), which was the first history of psychology written in English, pre-dating Edwin Boring's canonical History of Experimental Psychology (1929). Brett's work occurs in the wake of the divorce between psychology and philosophy, a divorce in which psychology was to undergo several changes in identity beginning with its attempt to be a "Science of consciousness" leading to a revisionist behavioural definition, the "science of behaviour" which in its turn was tied to the influence of observational-ism and the anti-metaphysical positivist spirit of the times. Brett's own position is one in which he claims that psychology lies at the confluence of three great traditions of inquiry: religious/philosophical inquiry, medical inquiry and what he calls "psychological" inquiry. He further states that it is difficult to distinguish the history of psychology from the history of philosophy. His volumes thus begin with the Pre-Socratics and trace metaphysical investigations insofar as they are connected with issues of philosophical psychology up to but not including twentieth-century theories. He presents the metaphysics of psychology insightfully but not always adequately, failing, for example, to appreciate the depth of Aristotelian and Kantian philosophical contributions to psychology. R. S. Peters revived Brett's work by carrying our a successful abridgment of his three volumes into one. In this work, Peters added reflections on twentieth-century theories that attempted to follow the pattern of Brett's earlier volumes. Brett guided courses and appointments in Toronto for many years. He was a fellow of the Royal Society of Canada. He also founded the Canadian Journal of Religious Thought, served as an editor for the Journal of General Psychology and the International Journal of Ethics, and was first editor of the University of Toronto Quarterly.
