= Canadian Federation for the Humanities and Social Sciences =

- Fédération canadienne des sciences humaines
- Formation: 1996; 30 years ago
- Merger of: Canadian Federation for the Humanities; Social Science Federation of Canada
- Legal status: Charitable organization
- Purpose: Advocate and public voice, educator and network
- Headquarters: Ottawa, Ontario, Canada
- Region served: Canada
- Members: 85,000 researchers in 81 scholarly associations, 80 universities and colleges, and 6 affiliates
- Official language: English; French
- President: Patrizia Albanese
- Executive director: Gabriel Miller
- Revenue: $4.1 million (2018)
- Expenses: $4.2 million (2018)
- Website: www.federationhss.ca

The Canadian Federation for the Humanities and Social Sciences (French: Fédération canadienne des sciences humaines), also known as the Federation for the Humanities and Social Sciences, is a member-based organization and the national voice for researchers in the humanities and social sciences in Canada. Formed in 1996 through a merger of the Social Science Federation of Canada and the Canadian Federation for the Humanities, it is a non-profit charitable organization that represents more than 85,000 researchers in 81 scholarly associations, 80 universities and colleges, and 6 affiliates across the country.

== Purpose ==
Through its activities, the federation strives to support and advance Canada's research in the humanities and social sciences, which are important for social, cultural and economic understanding and addressing the most pressing public policy issues of today.

Federation emphasizes that research within the fields of humanities and social science contributes to wider progress in public policy, technology, and economy.

The federation:

- represents and convenes one of the biggest research communities in Canada;
- hosts the biggest multidisciplinary gathering of scholars in North America;
- supports the publication of 150 scholarly books per year;
- awards scholarly book prizes each year;
- runs a series of lectures on Parliament Hill to bring humanities and social science research to policy makers;
- addresses professional matters, including equity issues;
- undertakes research projects to help advance Canada's humanities and social science fields.

The federation is a non-profit, charitable organization, governed by an executive committee and board of directors made up of scholars from its member groups with a permanent secretariat based in Ottawa, Ontario, Canada.

The federation's work is sustained by membership fees, revenue from its annual Congress of the Humanities and Social Sciences, project funding from the Social Sciences and Humanities Research Council and other government bodies, and through the support of colleagues, institutional donors and other individuals through the Canadian Endowment for the Humanities and Social Sciences.

== Congress of the Humanities and Social Sciences ==
Originally established in 1930 as the Learned Societies Conference, and later renamed the Congress of the Humanities and Social Sciences in 1996, this congress is the largest annual academic gathering in Canada and its multidisciplinary character marks it as unique in the world. Since its beginning, it has been an important meeting place for new and established academics and researchers working in such diverse areas as anthropology, bibliotherapy, communication and disability studies, English language and literature, French language and literature, geography, the history and philosophy of science, international development, Jacques Maritain studies, political science, social work, theatre research, Ukrainian studies, women's studies and many more. Congress is currently organized by the Federation for the Humanities and Social Sciences.

In 2014, from May 24 to May 31, approximately 8,000+ attendees representing 75 scholarly associations gathered at Brock University in St. Catharines, Ontario, Canada, from all over North America, Europe, Africa, and Asia to present their research and to debate some of the most important social and cultural questions of the day.

In 2020 Congress was held at the University of Western Ontario, London, Ontario from May 30 to June 5.

Congress 2023 was hosted by York University in Toronto. With over 10,300 attendees and 67 participating associations, Congress 2023 was one of the biggest scholarly events in Canadian history.

== Big Thinking ==
Formerly known as Breakfast on the Hill, the federation's Big Thinking lecture series lets leading researchers offer fresh ideas to Canada's parliamentarians. Perhaps more than any other program or lecture series, this one demonstrates the critical link between publicly funded research and policy development.

Launched in 1994, the Big Thinking series has featured more than 50 humanists and social scientists presenting their findings to thousands of key members in the Ottawa policy community. Held up to six times a year on Parliament Hill, Big Thinking lectures are delivered when the House and Senate are in session. The talks are high-profile opportunities to introduce evidence from current research on the most pressing public policy issues

== Awards to Scholarly Publications Program ==
The Awards to Scholarly Publications Program (ASPP) is a key activity of the Federation for the Humanities and Social Sciences. Formerly known as the Aid to Scholarly Publications Program, the ASPP is a competitive funding program designed to assist with the publication of scholarly books on topics in the humanities and social sciences.

Through this program, the federation supports research dissemination and encourages excellence in humanities and social science scholarship.

Under the program's mandate to support books of advanced scholarship in the humanities and social sciences that make an important contribution to knowledge, the ASPP has supported the publication of over 6,000 books that have helped to enrich the social, cultural and intellectual life of Canada and the world.

Each year, the ASPP offers 180 Publication Grants of $8,000 and five Translation Grants of $12,000, contributing 1.5 million dollars to the dissemination of Canadian research.

The federation gratefully acknowledges the funding of the Social Sciences and Humanities Research Council.

== Canada Prizes ==
The Canada Prizes are awarded annually to the best scholarly books in the humanities and social sciences that have received funding from the ASPP. The Canada Prizes are awarded to books that make an exceptional contribution to scholarship, are engagingly written, and enrich the social, cultural and intellectual life of Canada. Each winner receives $2,500.

In 2014, the Canada Prizes were awarded to the following books:

- Canada Prize in the Humanities (English): Sandra Djwa, Journey With No Maps: A Life of P.K. Page, published by McGill-Queen's University Press
- Canada Prize in the Humanities (French): Pierre Anctil, Jacob-Isaac Segal, 1896–1954 : Un poète yiddish de Montréal et son milieu, published by Presses de l'Université Laval
- Canada Prize in the Social Sciences (English): David E. Smith, Across the Aisle: Opposition in Canadian Politics, published by University of Toronto Press
- Canada Prize in the Social Sciences (French): Hugues Théorêt, Les chemises bleues : Adrien Arcand, journaliste antisémite canadien-français, published by Éditions du Septentrion

== Presidents ==
- 1996–1998 Chad Gaffield
- 1998–2000 Louise Forsyth
- 2000–2002 Patricia Clements
- 2002–2004 Doug Owram
- 2004–2006 Don Fisher
- 2006–2008 Noreen Golfman
- 2008–2009 Nathalie Des Rosiers
- 2009–2011 Noreen Golfman
- 2011–2013 Graham Carr
- 2013–2015 Antonia Maioni
- 2015–2017 Stephen Toope
- 2017–2019 Guy Laforest
- 2019–present Patrizia Albanese

== Executive Directors ==
- 1996–1998 Marcel Lauzière
- 1998–2001 Louise Robert
- 2001–2006 Paul Ledwell
- 2006–2009 Jody Ciufo
- 2009–2016 Jean-Marc Mangin
- 2016–2017 Christine Tausig Ford (interim)
- 2017–present Gabriel Miller
