= Kenneth L. Schmitz =

Canadian philosopher (1922–2017)

- Born: September 16, 1922; Humboldt, Saskatchewan, Canada
- Died: August 25, 2017 (aged 94); Fort Erie, Ontario, Canada
- Spouse: Lillian Oriel Patterson
- Children: 4

Education
- Education: St. Thomas More College (BA), University of Toronto (MA, PhD), Pontifical Institute of Mediaeval Studies (ecclesiastical licentiate)

Philosophical work
- Era: Contemporary philosophy
- Region: Western philosophy
- School: Continental philosophy
- Institutions: Loyola Marymount University, Marquette University, Indiana University Bloomington, University of Toronto, Catholic University of America
- Doctoral students: Michael Baur
- Notable students: John McCumber
- Main interests: Metaphysics

Kenneth L. Schmitz (1922–2017) was a Canadian philosopher. He was a president of the Metaphysical Society of America (1980).

== See also ==
- Francis Martin
