= University of Toronto Quarterly =

- Discipline: Humanities
- Language: English
- Edited by: Colin Hill

Publication details
- History: 1931-present
- Publisher: University of Toronto Press (Canada)
- Frequency: Quarterly

Standard abbreviations
- ISO 4: Univ. Tor. Q.

Indexing
- ISSN: 0042-0247 (print); 1712-5278 (web)

Links
- Journal homepage

The University of Toronto Quarterly, also abbreviated as UTQ, is an interdisciplinary academic journal of the humanities published by the University of Toronto Press. It was established in 1931 under the editorship of the philosopher George Sidney Brett. The current editor-in-chief is Colin Hill. The journal accepts submissions in either English or French. The journal is abstracted and indexed in Academic Search, the Arts and Humanities Citation Index, CrossRef, Current Contents, EBSCO databases, MLA International Bibliography, Project MUSE, Scopus, and Ulrich's Periodicals Directory.
