= Studies in Religion =

Studies in Religion/Sciences religieuses
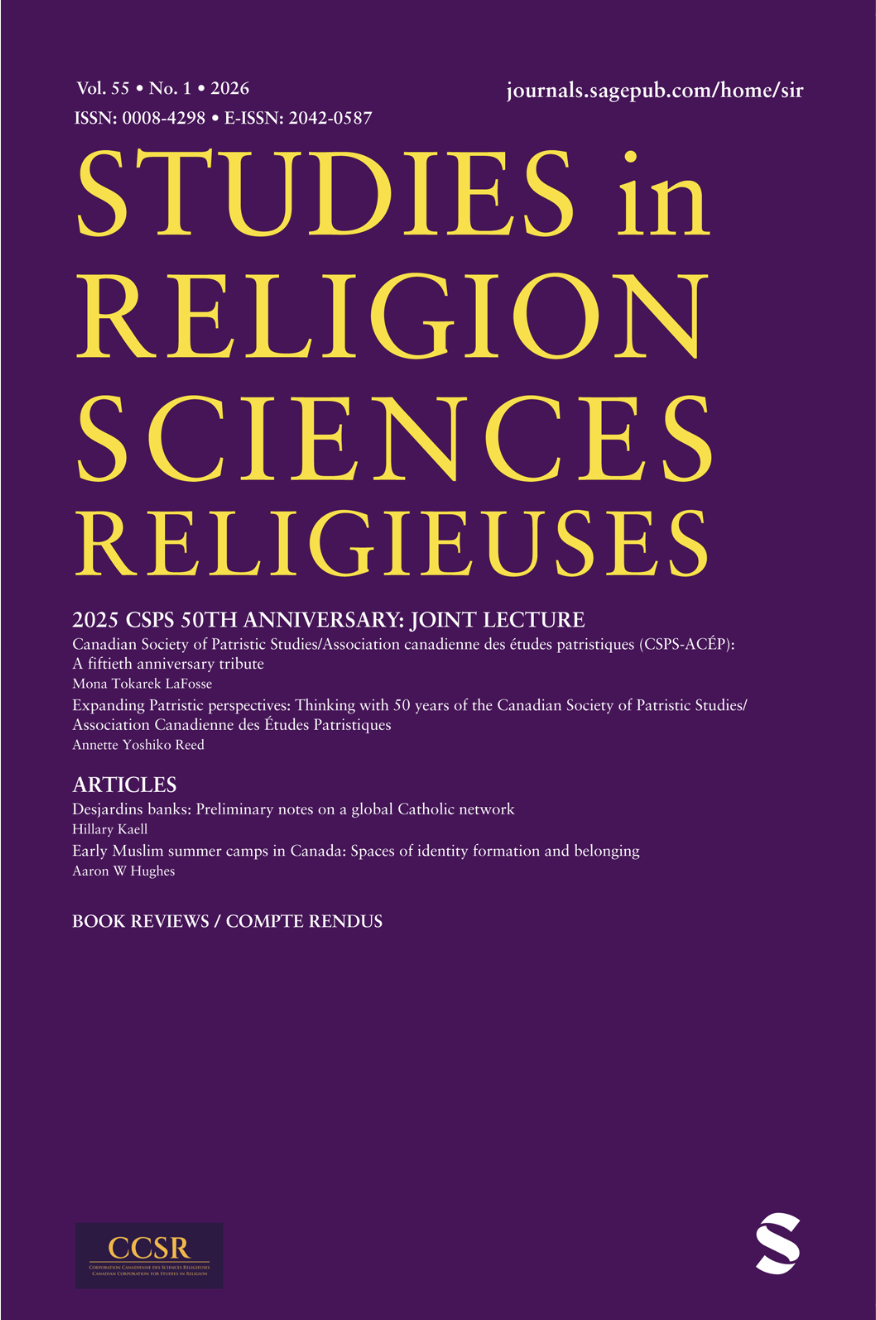
- Discipline: Religious studies
- Language: English, French
- Edited by: Xavier Gravend-Tirole, Zeba Crook

Publication details
- History: 1971–present
- Publisher: Sage Publishing on behalf of the Canadian Corporation for Studies in Religion
- Frequency: Quarterly

Standard abbreviations
- ISO 4: Stud. Relig.

Indexing
- ISSN: 0008-4298 (print); 2042-0587 (web)
- LCCN: 70648697
- OCLC no.: 1773426

Links
- Journal homepage; Online access; Online archive

Studies in Religion/Sciences religieuses is a quarterly peer-reviewed academic journal that publishes papers in English and French in the fields of religious studies, biblical studies, theology, patristics, Jewish studies, and Islamic studies, as well as scholarly book reviews in these same disciplines. The editors-in-chief are Xavier Gravend-Tirole (Université de Montréal) and Zeba Crook (Carleton University). The journal was established 1971 and is published by Sage Publishing on behalf of the Canadian Corporation for Studies in Religion.

== Abstracting and indexing ==
The journal is abstracted and indexed in:

- Arts and Humanities Citation Index
- Current Contents/Arts & Humanities
- International Review of Biblical Studies
- Religious and Theological Abstracts
- Theology Digest

== Editors-in-chief ==
The following persons

English Editor-in-chief	Issues	Rédacteur en chef francophone	Numéros
William Nicholls, University of British Columbia	1.1-3.1 (1971-1973)	Michel M. Campbell, Université de Montréal	1.1-5.4 (1971-76)
Joseph C. McLelland, McGill University	3.2-6.5 (1973-78)	Roger Lapointe, Université d'Ottawa	5.5-10.3 (1973-81)
Charles Davis, Concordia University	6.6-13.4 (1978-84)	Roland Chagnon, Université du Québec à Montréal	11.1-16.1, 16.4 (1982-87)
Tom Sinclair-Faulkner, Dalhousie University	14.1-18.4 (1985-89)	Elizabeth Lacelle, Université d'Ottawa	16.2-16.3, 17.1-22.1 (1987-93)
John Sandys-Wunsch, Thornloe College	19.1-25.1 (1990-96)	Monique Dumais, Université du Québec à Rimouski	22.2-28.1 (1993-99)
Pamela Dickey-Young, Queen's University	25.2-29.1 (1996-2000)	Marc Dumas, Université de Sherbrooke	28.2-32.2 (1999-2003)
Kay Koppedrayer, Wilfrid Laurier University	29.2-30.2 (2000-01)		
Bill Arnal, University of Regina	30.3-35.1 (2001-2006)	Guy Jobin, Université Laval	32.3-37.1 (2003-08)
Francis Landy, University of Alberta	35.2-41.2 (2006-12)	Alain Bouchard, Cégep de Sainte-Foy	37.2-45.2 (2008-16)
Patricia Dold, Memorial University of Newfoundland	41.3-45.2 (2012-16)		
Roxanne D. Marcotte, Université du Québec à Montréal	45.3-47.1 (2016-18)	Géraldine Mossière, Université de Montréal	45.3-47.1 (2016-18)
Zeba Crook, Carleton University	47.4- (2018-present)	Frédéric Dejean, Université de Montréal	47.4-48.1 (2018-19)
		Jean-François Laniel, Université Laval	48.2-53.2 (2019-24)
		Xavier Gravend-Tirole, Université de Montréal	53.3- (2024-Present)
