= Graeme Nicholson =

Canadian philosopher (1936–2021)

- Born: September 30, 1936; Halifax, Nova Scotia, Canada
- Died: February 21, 2021 (aged 84); Fergus, Ontario, Canada

Education
- Education: University of Toronto (PhD, 1968)
- Thesis: The Ontological Difference: A Study in Heidegger (1968)
- Doctoral advisor: Emil Fackenheim

Philosophical work
- Era: Contemporary philosophy
- Region: Western philosophy
- School: Continental philosophy, existentialism, hermeneutics, anarchism
- Institutions: University of Toronto
- Doctoral students: Michael Baur, Rebecca Comay, John McCumber

Graeme Nicholson (30 September 1936 — 21 February 2021) was a Canadian philosopher and emeritus professor of philosophy at the University of Toronto known for his research on ontology, hermeneutics, and anarchism.

== Life and works ==
He completed his doctorate at the University of Toronto with a thesis on Heidegger directed by Emil Fackenheim. Nicholson died on February 21, 2021, at the age of 84.

=== Selected publications ===
- Justifying Our Existence: An Essay in Applied Phenomenology (New Studies in Phenomenology and Hermeneutics), 2009
- Plato's Phaedrus: The Philosophy of Love (Purdue University Press Series in the History of Philosophy), 1999
- Illustrations of Being: Drawing upon Heidegger and upon Metaphysics (Contemporary Studies in Philosophy and the Human Sciences), Humanity Books, 1992
- Seeing and Reading (Contemporary Studies in Philosophy and the Human Sciences), Palgrave Macmillan, 1984
- Hans-Georg Gadamer on Education, Poetry and History, 1992
- Heidegger’s Being and Time: Critical Essays (Critical Essays on the Classics Series), 2005

== See also ==
- Philosophy in Canada
