= List of philosophy journals =

This is a list of academic journals pertaining to the field of philosophy.

== Journals in Catalan ==
- Filosofia, ara!

== Journals in Chinese ==
- Waiguo Zhexue

== Journals in Czech ==
- Filosofický časopis
- Reflexe

== Journals in Danish ==
- Kierkegaard Studies Monograph Series (also in English, French and German)
- Kierkegaard Studies Yearbook (also in English, French and German)

== Journals in Dutch ==
- Krisis

== Journals in English ==
- Acta Philosophica Fennica
- American Catholic Philosophical Quarterly
- American Journal of Bioethics
- The American Journal of Semiotics
- American Philosophical Quarterly
- Analyse & Kritik
- Analysis
- Analytic Philosophy
- Ancient Philosophy
- Angelaki
- Apeiron
- Archiv für Geschichte der Philosophie
- (Defunct) Arendt Studies
- (Defunct) Ars Disputandi
- Augustinian Studies
- Australasian Journal of Philosophy
- Avant: Journal of the Philosophical-Interdisciplinary Vanguard
- Berkeley Studies
- Between the Species
- Bioethics
- Biology and Philosophy
- Biological Theory (journal)
- British Journal for the History of Philosophy
- British Journal for the Philosophy of Science
- British Journal of Aesthetics
- Bulletin of Symbolic Logic
- Business and Professional Ethics Journal
- Business Ethics Quarterly
- Canadian Journal of Philosophy
- Chiasmi International
- The CLR James Journal
- Comparative and Continental Philosophy
- Conatus (journal)
- Consciousness and Cognition
- Constructivist Foundations
- Contemporary Political Theory
- Contemporary Pragmatism
- Continent
- Continental Philosophy Review
- Croatian Journal of Philosophy
- Cultura: International Journal of Philosophy of Culture and Axiology
- Derrida Today
- dialectica
- Dialogue: Canadian Philosophical Review
- Dionysius
- Disputatio
- Environmental Ethics
- Environmental Philosophy
- Episteme
- Epoché
- Ergo
- Erkenntnis
- Essays in the Philosophy of Humanism
- Ethical Theory and Moral Practice
- Ethics
- Ethics & Animals
- Ethics and Information Technology
- Ethics in Progress
- European Journal of Philosophy
- European Journal of Political Theory
- Erasmus Journal for Philosophy and Economics
- Existenz
- Faith and Philosophy
- Feminist Philosophy Quarterly
- Film and Philosophy
- Foucault Studies
- Foundations of Physics
- Graduate Faculty Philosophy Journal
- The Harvard Review of Philosophy
- Hegel Bulletin
- Heidegger Studies
- The Heythrop Journal
- History and Philosophy of the Life Sciences
- Humana.Mente
- Hume Studies
- Hypatia
- Idealistic Studies
- Inquiry: An Interdisciplinary Journal of Philosophy
- Inquiry: Critical Thinking Across the Disciplines
- International Journal of Applied Philosophy
- International Journal of Philosophical Studies
- International Journal of the Platonic Tradition
- International Philosophical Quarterly
- International Studies in Philosophy
- Isis
- Journal for General Philosophy of Science
- Journal for the History of Analytical Philosophy
- The Journal of Aesthetics and Art Criticism
- The Journal of Nietzsche Studies
- Journal of Animal Ethics
- Journal of Applied Philosophy
- Journal of Business Ethics Education
- Journal of Consciousness Studies
- The Journal of Ethics
- Journal of the History of Philosophy
- Journal of Indian Philosophy
- Journal of Information Ethics
- Journal of Moral Philosophy
- Journal of Philosophical Logic
- Journal of Philosophical Research
- The Journal of Philosophy
- Journal of Scottish Philosophy
- Journal of Social Philosophy
- Journal of Speculative Philosophy
- Journal of Symbolic Logic
- The Journal of Theological Studies
- Journal of Value Inquiry
- Kantian Review
- Kriterion - Journal of Philosophy
- Kritike
- The Leibniz Review
- Levinas Studies
- Linguistic and Philosophical Investigations
- Logical Analysis and History of Philosophy
- Metaphilosophy
- Midwest Studies in Philosophy
- Mind
- Mind & Language
- Minds and Machines
- The Modern Schoolman
- The Monist
- Moral Philosophy and Politics
- New Nietzsche Studies
- The New Scholasticism
- (Defunct) New Vico Studies
- Notre Dame Philosophical Reviews
- Noûs
- (Defunct) The Owl of Minerva
- Pacific Philosophical Quarterly
- (Defunct) Philo
- The Philosopher
- Philosophers' Imprint
- The Philosophers' Magazine
- PhiloSOPHIA
- Philosophia: Philosophical Quarterly of Israel
- Philosophia Africana
- Philosophia Christi
- Philosophia Mathematica
- Philosophia Reformata
- Philosophical Explorations
- The Philosophical Forum
- Philosophical Inquiry
- Philosophical Investigations
- Philosophical Issues
- Philosophical Papers
- Philosophical Perspectives
- Philosophical Psychology
- The Philosophical Quarterly
- The Philosophical Review
- Philosophical Studies
- Philosophical Topics
- Philosophy
- Philosophy and Phenomenological Research
- Philosophy & Public Affairs
- Philosophy & Technology
- Philosophy and Theology
- Philosophy East and West
- Philosophy in the Contemporary World
- Philosophy in Review
- Philosophy Now
- Philosophy of Management
- Philosophy of Science
- Philosophy Today
- Phronesis
- Polish Journal of Philosophy
- Politics, Philosophy & Economics
- Praxis Journal of Philosophy
- Proceedings of the American Catholic Philosophical Association
- Proceedings of the American Philosophical Society
- Proceedings of the Aristotelian Society
- Professional Ethics
- Psyche
- Public Affairs Quarterly
- Quaestio History of Metaphysics; also publishes in French, German, and Italian
- Questions
- Quodlibet
- Ratio
- Res Publica (journal)
- The Review of Metaphysics
- Review of Philosophy and Psychology
- Science & Education Contributions from history, philosophy, and sociology of science and mathematics
- Semiotica
- Sign Systems Studies
- Social Philosophy Today
- Social Theory and Practice
- Southern Journal of Philosophy
- Studia Neoaristotelica
- Studia Phaenomenologica
- Studies in History and Philosophy of Science
- Synthese
- Teaching Ethics
- Teaching Philosophy
- Techné
- Teorema
- Theoria
- Think
- Thought: Fordham University Quarterly
- Thought: A Journal of Philosophy
- (Defunct) Tulane Studies in Philosophy
- Utilitas

== Journals in French ==
- Actuel Marx
- Bulletin de Philosophie Médiévale Mediaeval Philosophy; also publishes in English, German, Italian, and Spanish
- Dialogue
- Esprit
- Éthiopiques
- Études Phénoménologiques
- Revue de métaphysique et de morale
- Revue de synthèse
- Revue philosophique de la France et de l'étranger
- Revue Philosophique de Louvain

== Journals in German ==
- Archiv für Begriffsgeschichte
- Archiv für Geschichte der Philosophie
- Archiv für Rechts- und Sozialphilosophie
- Cultura: International Journal of Philosophy of Culture and Axiology
- Deutsche Zeitschrift für Philosophie
- Grazer Philosophische Studien
- Hegel-Studien
- Heidegger Studies
- Kant-Studien
- Kriterion - Journal of Philosophy
- Merkur
- Zeitschrift für allgemeine Wissenschaftstheorie
- Zeitschrift für Philosophie und philosophische Kritik

== Journals in Hebrew ==
- Iyyun

== Journals in Italian ==
- Agalma
- Epistemologia

== Journals in Norwegian ==
- Agora

== Journals in Persian ==
- Journal of Philosophical Investigations

== Journals in Polish ==
- Avant: Journal of the Philosophical-Interdisciplinary Vanguard

== Journals in Portuguese ==
- Disputatio
- Lumen Veritatis
- Philosophica

== Journals in Russian ==
- Problems of Philosophy (magazine)
- Under the Banner of Marxism

== Journals in Spanish ==
- Análisis Filosófico
- Anuario Filosófico
- Revista Española de Filosofía Medieval
- Revista Ideas y Valores

== Journals in Swedish ==
- Filosofisk tidskrift

== See also ==
- Category:Philosophical novels
- List of ethics journals
- Lists of academic journals
