= Philosophy Today =

- Discipline: Philosophy
- Language: English
- Edited by: Peg Birmingham

Publication details
- History: 1957–present
- Publisher: Philosophy Documentation Center for the Philosophy Department of DePaul University (United States)
- Frequency: Quarterly

Standard abbreviations
- ISO 4: Philos. Today

Indexing
- ISSN: 0031-8256 (print); 2329-8596 (web)
- LCCN: 6252001
- OCLC no.: 1762294

Links
- Journal homepage; Online access

Philosophy Today is an international peer-reviewed journal that reflects the current questions, topics and debates of contemporary philosophy, with a particular focus on continental philosophy.

The journal is especially interested in original work at the intersection of philosophy, political theory, comparative literature, and cultural studies. It seeks to provoke discussion and debate among various intellectual traditions, including critical theory, phenomenology, hermeneutics, feminism, and psychoanalysis. The journal provides space for reviews, as well as short translations of the works of contemporary philosophical figures originally published in other languages. It publishes special issues dedicated to particular topics, and for many years published Selected Studies in Phenomenology and Existential Philosophy in cooperation with the Society for Phenomenology and Existential Philosophy (SPEP). It has a Level 1 classification from the JUFO Publication Forum of the Federation of Finnish Learned Societies. and a SHERPA/RoMEO "green" self-archiving policy.

Philosophy Today is owned by the Philosophy Department of DePaul University and published on its behalf by the Philosophy Documentation Center.

== Indexing ==
Philosophy Today is abstracted and indexed in the following bibliographic databases:

- Academic ASAP
- Academic Search Complete
- Academic Search Premier
- ArticleFirst
- Arts and Humanities Citation Index
- Atla Religion Database
- CARHUS Plus+ 2014
- Crossref Cited-by Linking
- DIALNET
- EBSCO Discover
- ERIH PLUS
- FRANCIS
- Humanities Abstracts
- Index Religiosus
- International Philosophical Bibliography
- JUFO
- MLA International Bibliography
- Periodicals Index Online
- The Philosopher's Index
- PhilPapers
- ProQuest 5000
- ProQuest Summon
- Scopus

== See also ==
- List of philosophy journals
