= Archiv für Rechts- und Sozialphilosophie =

- Discipline: Philosophy
- Language: English, French, German, Spanish
- Edited by: Annette Brockmöller

Publication details
- History: 1907–present
- Publisher: Franz Steiner Verlag
- Frequency: Quarterly

Standard abbreviations
- ISO 4: Arch. Rechts Sozialphilos.

Indexing
- ISSN: 0001-2343
- LCCN: 10004160
- OCLC no.: 699621635

Links
- Journal homepage; Online tables of contents

Archiv für Rechts- und Sozialphilosophie (English: Archives for Philosophy of Law and Social Philosophy) is a quarterly peer-reviewed academic journal of philosophy. It was established in 1907 and is the official journal of the Internationale Vereinigung für Rechts- und Sozialphilosophie. The journal is abstracted and indexed in the Index to Foreign Legal Periodicals, Index Philosophicus, FRANCIS, Russian Academy of Sciences Bibliographies, The Philosopher's Index, Répertoire Bibliographique de la Philosophie, International Bibliography of the Social Sciences, and PhilPapers.

== See also ==
- List of philosophy journals
