= Studia Heideggeriana =

- Discipline: Philosophy
- Language: English, Spanish

Publication details
- History: 2011–present
- Publisher: Ibero-American Society of Heideggerian Studies
- Frequency: Annually
- ISO 4: Find out here

Indexing
- ISSN: 2250-8740 (print); 2250-8767 (web)

Links
- Online access

Studia Heideggeriana is an open-access annual peer-reviewed academic journal covering the thought of Martin Heidegger published by Ibero-American Society of Heideggerian Studies (SIEH). It was established in 2011 and publishes contributions in English and Spanish. The editor-in-chief is Stefano Cazzanelli (Universidad Complutense de Madrid, Spain).

== Abstracting and indexing ==
The journal is abstracted and indexed in:

- SCImago Journal Rank
- Scopus
- Clasificación CIRC
- International Directory of Philosophy
- DOAJ
- REDIB
- Latindex
- ROAD: Directory of Open Access Scholarly Resources
- Periódicos Capes
- Ulrichsweb
- Philpapers
- Google Scholar
- OCLC
- MIAR: Information Matrix for the Analysis of Journals
- ERIH PLUS
- Dialnet
- Philosopher's Index

== See also ==
- List of philosophy journals
