= Cultura (journal) =

- Discipline: Philosophy, culture, ethics, aesthetics
- Language: English, French, German, Italian
- Edited by: Nicolae Râmbu

Publication details
- History: 2004–present
- Publisher: Peter Lang, Philosophy Documentation Center
- Frequency: Biannual

Standard abbreviations
- ISO 4: Cultura

Indexing
- ISSN: 1584-1057 (print); 2065-5002 (web)
- LCCN: 2010269044
- OCLC no.: 321528340

Links
- Journal homepage; Online access

Cultura: International Journal of Philosophy of Culture and Axiology is a biannual peer-reviewed academic journal that was established in 2004 and covers philosophical work exploring different values and cultural phenomena. The journal is published in print format by Peter Lang. Online access to all issues of Cultura from 2005 to the present is provided by the Philosophy Documentation Center.

== Abstracting and indexing ==
Cultura is abstracted and indexed in Arts and Humanities Citation Index, Humanities International Complete, Humanities International Index, International Bibliography of Periodical Literature, International Bibliography of the Social Sciences, MLA International Bibliography, Naviga, Primo Central Index, The Philosopher's Index, PhilPapers, Philosophy Research Index, Scopus (Discontinued in 2026), and TOC Premier.

== See also ==
- Axiology
- List of philosophy journals
