= Social Philosophy Today =

- Discipline: Philosophy, political science, sociology
- Language: English
- Edited by: Zachary Hoskins, Joan Woolfrey

Publication details
- History: 1988–present
- Publisher: Philosophy Documentation Center (United States)
- Frequency: Annual

Standard abbreviations
- ISO 4: Soc. Philos. Today

Indexing
- ISSN: 1543-4044 (print); 2153-9448 (web)
- LCCN: 2003212934
- OCLC no.: 20575691

Links
- Journal homepage; Online access

Social Philosophy Today is a peer-reviewed interdisciplinary journal sponsored by the North American Society for Social Philosophy.

== Background ==
It was established in 1988 by founding editors Yeager Hudson and Creighton Peden. The journal provides a forum for in-depth discussion of contemporary social issues. Each issue includes peer-reviewed papers drawn from those presented at the International Social Philosophy Conference, the annual event of the North American Society for Social Philosophy. The journal also accepts original submissions not previously submitted to the International Social Philosophy Conference but which address the conference theme or respond to previously published Social Philosophy Today articles. The journal is published by the Philosophy Documentation Center.

== Abstracting and indexing ==
Social Philosophy Today is abstracted and indexed in:

- Academic Search Premier
- Bibliographie de la Philosophie
- Humanities International Index
- Index Philosophicus
- International Bibliography of Periodical Literature
- International Bibliography of the Social Sciences
- International Philosophical Bibliography
- Periodicals Index Online
- The Philosopher's Index
- PhilPapers
- Political Science Complete
- SocINDEX
- Sociological Abstracts
- TOC Premier
- Worldwide Political Science Abstracts

== See also ==
- List of philosophy journals
- List of political science journals
