= New Nietzsche Studies =

- Discipline: Philosophy
- Language: English
- Edited by: Babette Babich, David B. Allison

Publication details
- History: 1996–present
- Publisher: Nietzsche Society (United States)
- Frequency: Biannual

Standard abbreviations
- ISO 4: New Nietzsche Stud.

Indexing
- ISSN: 1091-0239 (print); 2153-8417 (web)
- LCCN: 97660790
- OCLC no.: 35625386

Links
- Journal homepage; Journal page at Philosophy Documentation Center; Online access

New Nietzsche Studies is a peer-reviewed academic journal devoted to scholarly examination of Friedrich Nietzsche's thought and edited by Babette Babich and David B. Allison. Established in 1996, it is the journal of the Nietzsche Society. The journal is abstracted and indexed in the International Philosophical Bibliography, Philosopher's Index, Philosophy Research Index, and PhilPapers. New Nietzsche Studies is produced at Fordham University and all issues are available online from the Philosophy Documentation Center.

== See also ==
- List of philosophy journals
