= Philosophy in the Contemporary World =

- Discipline: Philosophy
- Language: English
- Edited by: Taine Duncan, Geoff Pfeifer

Publication details
- History: 1994–present
- Publisher: Society for Philosophy in the Contemporary World (United States)
- Frequency: Biannual

Standard abbreviations
- ISO 4: Philos. Contemp. World

Indexing
- ISSN: 1077-1999 (print); 2153-3377 (web)
- LCCN: sn942657
- OCLC no.: 30719791

Links
- Journal homepage; Online access

Philosophy in the Contemporary World is a peer-reviewed academic journal sponsored by the Society for Philosophy in the Contemporary World. The journal covers issues in applied philosophy, philosophy and public policy, race and gender studies, environmental philosophy, educational philosophy, and multiculturalism, especially when crossing disciplinary boundaries. Members of the Society for Philosophy in the Contemporary World receive the journal as a benefit of membership. All issues are available online from the Philosophy Documentation Center.

== Abstracting and indexing ==
Philosophy in the Contemporary World is abstracted and indexed in:

- Academic Search
- Humanities International Index
- Index Philosophicus
- International Bibliography of Periodical Literature
- International Bibliography of the Social Sciences
- The Philosopher's Index
- PhilPapers
- SocINDEX
- TOC Premier

== See also ==
- List of philosophy journals
