= Chiasmi International =

- Discipline: Philosophy
- Language: English, French, Italia
- Edited by: Mauro Carbone, Leonard Lawlor, Federico Leoni, Pierre Rodrigo

Publication details
- Former name(s): Chiasmi
- History: 1999–present
- Publisher: Mimesis Edizioni, Librairie philosophique J. Vrin, Pennsylvania State University
- Frequency: Annual

Standard abbreviations
- ISO 4: Chiasmi Int.

Indexing
- ISSN: 1637-6757 (print); 2155-6415 (web)
- LCCN: 2004-205562
- OCLC no.: 45823463

Links
- Journal homepage; Online access

Chiasmi International: Trilingual Studies Concerning the Thought of Merleau-Ponty is a peer-reviewed academic journal that publishes articles, reviews, and discussions in Italian, French, and English on the thought of the French philosopher Maurice Merleau-Ponty. The journal is produced in cooperation with the Italian Società di Studi su Maurice Merleau-Ponty, and is distributed by Mimesis Edizioni in Italy , Librairie philosophique J. Vrin in France, and Pennsylvania State University in the United States. All issues are available online from the Philosophy Documentation Center. The journal is abstracted and indexed in The Philosopher's Index, PhilPapers, and the Philosophy Research Index.

== See also ==
- List of philosophy journals
