= Tulane Studies in Philosophy =

- Discipline: Philosophy
- Language: English
- Edited by: Robert C. Whittemore (final editor)

Publication details
- History: 1952-1987
- Publisher: Philosophy Documentation Center (United States)
- Frequency: Annual

Standard abbreviations
- ISO 4: Tulane Stud. Philos.

Indexing
- ISSN: 0082-6766 (print); 2154-0462 (web)
- LCCN: 543575
- OCLC no.: 1605064

Links
- Journal homepage; Online access

Tulane Studies in Philosophy was a peer-reviewed academic journal, formerly published by the philosophy department at Tulane University in New Orleans. The journal published original articles by invited contributors and members of the Tulane philosophy department. Notable contributors included Lewis S. Ford, Charles Hartshorne, John Lachs, Andrew Reck, and Sandra B. Rosenthal. Established in 1952 by James Feibleman, the journal was published annually until his death in 1987. All volumes are available online from the Philosophy Documentation Center.

== Indexing ==
Tulane Studies in Philosophy has been abstracted and indexed in Periodicals Index Online, The Philosopher's Index, Philosophy Research Index, and PhilPapers.

== See also ==
- List of philosophy journals
