= Philosophical Inquiry =

- Discipline: Philosophy
- Language: English, French, German
- Edited by: D.Z. Andriopoulos

Publication details
- History: 1978–present
- Publisher: Philosophy Documentation Center (United States)
- Frequency: Quarterly

Standard abbreviations
- ISO 4: Philos. Inq.

Indexing
- ISSN: 1105-235X (print); 2163-3215 (web)
- LCCN: sn8220441
- OCLC no.: 5143336

Links
- Journal homepage; Tables of content; Special issues

Philosophical Inquiry is a peer-reviewed academic journal that publishes articles, reviews, and critical notes in all areas of philosophy. The journal aims to facilitate international communication of philosophical thought, and it does this by publishing submissions in English, German, or French from authors in several countries. Notable contributors include Gerard Casey, Theodoros Christidis, Alexander Nehamas, Vasiliki Karavakou, Fred Miller, Ron Polansky, Michael Polemis, and Nicholas Rescher. The journal is indexed in the International Philosophical Bibliography, The Philosopher's Index, and PhilPapers, and it has a Level 1 classification from the Publication Forum of the Federation of Finnish Learned Societies. Philosophical Inquiry was established in 1978 by Prof. Dimitri Z. Andriopoulos and was published for many years in cooperation with the Aristotle University of Thessaloniki. This journal is now published by the Philosophy Documentation Center.

== See also ==
- List of philosophy journals
