= James Doull =

Canadian philosopher and academic (1918–2001)

James Alexander Doull (1918–2001) was a Canadian philosopher and academic who was born and lived most of his life in Nova Scotia. His father was the politician, jurist, and historian John Doull.

== Biography ==
From the late 1940s until the mid-1980s, he taught in the Department of Classics at Dalhousie University in Halifax. He was himself educated at Dalhousie as well as at the University of Toronto, Harvard University, and New College, Oxford, where he was a Rhodes Scholar.

In 2003, the University of Toronto Press published a substantial volume containing a number of his works together with commentary provided by former colleagues and students. The appearance of this compilation, which also contains biographical details upon which this article is largely based, is perhaps among the reasons that Doull is now rather better known than he was at any point during his life. It contains writings on Greek poetry; the culture of ancient Rome; ancient, medieval, and modern philosophy; and twentieth-century politics; and certain key figures (such as Plato, Augustine, and Hegel) receive particular attention. In general, the collection reflects Doull's deep conviction that the western philosophical tradition as a whole remains of great relevance and also his special interest in Hegel, with whose philosophical position Doull was in close agreement. Indeed, his Hegelian views (especially his judgement that Hegel had been successful in his attempt to articulate in the form of self-developing concepts the inner content of the Christian revelation) were no doubt a major reason that he was regarded as outside the philosophical mainstream.

He studied with Werner Jaeger at Harvard, and during his life met several important figures (Gilson, for example) in twentieth-century philosophy; but he did not in general show much sign of having been formed philosophically by those he met, or indeed by anyone after Hegel. The Canadian philosopher Charles Norris Cochrane, with whom he studied in Toronto, is perhaps the only notable exception to this.

He greatly admired the playing of the Canadian pianist Glenn Gould, with whom he shared, in addition to an extraordinary independence of mind, a vision of Canadian spiritual life (which for Doull encompassed such spheres as politics, art, religion, and philosophy) that combined both a receptivity to the possibilities of the new world and a strong sense of continuity with the European past. Hans-Georg Gadamer expressed surprise at having encountered a person of such comprehensive erudition in North America. Emil Fackenheim called him the only Hegelian. His colleague and friend George Grant said of him: 'Of all the Canadians of my generation, he certainly has the clearest intellect of any I have known. Nothing I would ever have to say about philosophy will compare to his knowledge of it.

Many of his published articles can be found in the journal Dionysius, of which he was one of the founding Editors and in connection with which he was (together with his fellow Editors A. H. Armstrong and R. D. Crouse) remarkably successful in recruiting as Editorial Advisors many distinguished scholars, among whom were Werner Beierwaltes, Henry Chadwick, Mary T. Clark, Emil Fackenheim, Eugene Fairweather, J. N. Findlay, Hans-Georg Gadamer, George Grant, Malcolm Ross, Wilfred Cantwell Smith, and George Williams. He also published a number of essays in the electronic journal Animus, the tenth Volume of which was devoted to essays on his life and thought.

In 1989, he was admitted honoris causa to the degree of Doctor Civilis Legis (DCL) of the University of King's College in Halifax.

== See also ==
- Hegelianism
- Canadian Idealism
- Philosophy in Canada
