= Ideas y Valores =

- Discipline: Philosophy
- Language: Spanish
- Edited by: Jorge Aurelio Díaz

Publication details
- Former name(s): Ideas
- History: 1951–1953; 1963–1971; 1975–present
- Publisher: National University of Colombia (Colombia)
- Frequency: Triannual

Standard abbreviations
- ISO 4: Ideas Valores

Indexing
- ISSN: 0120-0062

Links
- Journal homepage

Ideas y Valores is an open access academic journal of philosophy edited and published four-monthly by the National University of Colombia. Throughout its more than sixty years of existence, the journal's objective has been to provide a space for the publication and dissemination of philosophical work carried out in Colombia. However, Ideas y Valores has always been in close contact with the philosophical work carried out in Latin America and the world. It currently publishes articles and reviews on all philosophical areas in Spanish, Portuguese and, occasionally, English. The journal also receives translations to Spanish of texts which have lost their copyrights or whose copyrights have been bought by or given to the translator and, by extension, to Ideas y Valores.

The journal also designs and publishes supplements on specific authors or topics whenever there are special academic events or at the request of the academic community. These supplements do not interfere with the journal's regular publishing schedule.

== Brief history ==
Ideas y Valores was founded in 1951 by Cayetano Betancur, then dean of the School of Philosophy at the National University of Colombia. The journal's original title was Ideas, a title that was meant to evoke Plato and that reflected the speculative orientation that Betancur wanted to give to the journal. The name was changed for the second issue due to the existence of another journal at the same university with a similar name. Ideas y Valores has been published almost uninterruptedly since 1951, except for some interruptions between 1954 and 1962, and between 1972 and 1974.

The current editor of the journal is Professor Jorge Aurelio Díaz.

Ideas y Valores is indexed in Publindex of COLCIENCIAS (Category A2), Philosopher's Index, Ulrich's, The International Philosophical Bibliography, Biblioteca Electrónica Scielo Colombia, DIALNET, Redalyc, Latindex, and the Répertoire Bibliographique de la Philosophie.

== See also ==
- List of scientific journals
- List of philosophy journals
