= Inquiry: Critical Thinking Across the Disciplines =

Inquiry
- Discipline: Philosophy
- Language: English
- Edited by: Thomas Brommage

Publication details
- History: 1988–2005, 2010–present
- Publisher: Philosophy Documentation Center for Sam Houston State University Department of Psychology and Philosophy (United States)
- Frequency: Biannually

Standard abbreviations
- ISO 4: Inquiry

Indexing
- ISSN: 1093-1082 (print); 2153-9871 (web)
- LCCN: 97-648232
- OCLC no.: 27954006

Links
- Journal homepage; Journal content, 1994–present; Special issues

Inquiry: Critical Thinking Across the Disciplines is a peer-reviewed academic journal established in 1988 by the Institute for Critical Thinking (Montclair State University). The journal publishes articles and reviews on various aspects of critical thinking. After a brief suspension starting in 2005, publication of the journal resumed in 2010 with a new editorial team located at Sam Houston State University. The journal took another pause from 2016 to 2020, resuming publication in 2021. All issues are available online, and single documents can be accessed by non-subscribers. The journal is published by the Philosophy Documentation Center. The founding editors-in-chief were Wendy Oxman and Robert Michael Esformes; the current editor is Thomas Brommage (Sam Houston State University).

== Indexing ==
Inquiry is abstracted and indexed in Expanded Academic ASAP, Index Philosophicus, InfoTrac OneFile, International Bibliography of Book Reviews of Scholarly Literature, International Bibliography of Periodical Literature, MLA International Bibliography, Philosopher's Index, Philosophy Research Index, PhilPapers, and PsycINFO.

== See also ==
- List of philosophy journals
