= Epoché (journal) =

- Discipline: History of philosophy
- Language: English
- Edited by: Sara Brill

Publication details
- History: 1993–present
- Publisher: Philosophy Documentation Center (United States)
- Frequency: Semiannual

Standard abbreviations
- ISO 4: Epoché

Indexing
- ISSN: 1085-1968 (print); 2153-8603 (web)
- LCCN: 2010-200038
- OCLC no.: 67618869

Links
- Journal homepage; Online access

Epoché: A Journal for the History of Philosophy is a peer-reviewed academic journal about the history of philosophy and its essential role in contemporary philosophical discussion. The journal is open to different ideas and approaches, but it is particularly interested in articles from the continental or hermeneutic traditions. The journal is edited by Sara Brill at Fairfield University. It is published twice yearly on a non-profit by the Philosophy Documentation Center.

== Indexing ==
Epoché: A Journal for the History of Philosophy is abstracted and indexed in the following bibliographic databases:

- Academic Search Premier
- Atla Religion Database
- ERIH PLUS
- Expanded Academic ASAP
- FRANCIS
- Humanities International Index
- IBZ Online
- InfoTrac OneFile
- MLA International Bibliography
- PhilPapers
- The Philosopher's Index
- Scopus

== See also ==
- List of philosophy journals
