= Environmental Philosophy (journal) =

- Discipline: Philosophy, ethics
- Language: English
- Edited by: Marjolein Oele

Publication details
- History: 2004–present
- Publisher: Philosophy Documentation Center
- Frequency: Biannual

Standard abbreviations
- ISO 4: Environ. Philos.

Indexing
- ISSN: 1718-0198 (print); 2153-8905 (web)
- LCCN: cn2006300749
- JSTOR: enviphil
- OCLC no.: 68552984

Links
- Journal homepage; Journal content with abstracts

Environmental Philosophy is a peer-reviewed academic journal that publishes articles, reviews, and discussions relevant to all areas of environmental philosophy. The journal was established in 2004 and is edited by Marjolein Oele at the University of San Francisco. It is sponsored by the International Association for Environmental Philosophy and is the successor to a previous publication from this Association (Call to Earth). The journal is published twice yearly in May and November issues by the Philosophy Documentation Center.

== Abstracting and indexing ==
Environmental Philosophy is abstracted and indexed in:

- ERIH PLUS
- Environment Index
- GreenFile
- MLA International Bibliography
- Philosopher's Index
- PhilPapers

It is also ranked by the Norwegian Scientific Index and Finland's Julkaisufoorumi (JUFO) Publication Forum.

== See also ==
- List of philosophy journals
- List of environmental journals
