= Film and Philosophy =

- Discipline: philosophy, film studies
- Language: English
- Edited by: Laura T. Di Summa

Publication details
- History: 1994–present
- Publisher: Philosophy Documentation Center (United States)
- Frequency: Annual

Standard abbreviations
- ISO 4: Film Philos.

Indexing
- ISSN: 1073-0427 (print); 2643-9239 (web)
- LCCN: sn93004458
- OCLC no.: 29296757

Links
- Journal homepage; Online access

Film and Philosophy is a peer-reviewed academic journal that examines films from a philosophical perspective. It was established in 1994 and is sponsored by the Society for the Philosophic Study of the Contemporary Visual Arts. The journal has examined various film genres, including horror and science fiction films, and contributed to feminist philosophy of film. It has also published special issues on ethical issues and existential themes in film, as well as philosophical themes in the films of Woody Allen. For many years the journal was edited by Daniel Shaw at Lock Haven University of Pennsylvania. It is currently edited by Laura T. Di Summa. Publication of the journal is managed on the Society's behalf by the Philosophy Documentation Center.

== Abstracting and indexing ==
The journal is indexed in ERIH PLUS, the International Index to Film Periodicals, MLA International Bibliography, The Philosopher's Index, Post Script: Essays in Film and the Humanities, and PhilPapers.

== See also ==
- Philosophy of film
- List of philosophy journals
