= Philosophy and Theology =

- Discipline: Philosophy, religious studies
- Language: English
- Edited by: James B. South

Publication details
- Former names: Philosophy, Theology
- History: 1986–present
- Publisher: Philosophy Documentation Center (United States)
- Frequency: Biannual

Standard abbreviations
- ISO 4: Philos. Theol.

Indexing
- ISSN: 0890-2461 (print); 2153-828X (web)
- OCLC no.: 14228352

Links
- Journal homepage; Online access

Philosophy and Theology is a peer-reviewed academic journal that publishes articles and reviews exploring connections between philosophy and theology. It was established in 1986 by Andrew Tallon at Marquette University and is the journal of the Karl Rahner Society. One issue of each volume is dedicated to Rahner's thought. Since 1997 the journal has been published on behalf of Marquette University by the Philosophy Documentation Center. All issues are available in electronic format.

== Indexing ==
Philosophy and Theology is abstracted and indexed Academic Search, Current Abstracts, Expanded Academic ASAP, Index Philosophicus, InfoTrac OneFile, International Bibliography of Book Reviews of Scholarly Literature, International Bibliography of Periodical Literature, MLA International Bibliography, Periodicals Index Online, Philosopher's Index, Philosophy Research Index, PhilPapers, Religion Index, Religious and Theological Abstracts, and TOC Premier.

== See also ==
- List of philosophy journals
- List of theology journals
