= New Vico Studies =

- Discipline: History of philosophy
- Language: English
- Edited by: Donald Phillip Verene

Publication details
- History: 1983–2010
- Publisher: Philosophy Documentation Center (United States)
- Frequency: Annual

Standard abbreviations
- ISO 4: New Vico Stud.

Indexing
- ISSN: 0733-9542 (print); 2153-8255 (web)
- OCLC no.: 8675347

Links
- Journal homepage; Online access

New Vico Studies was a peer-reviewed academic journal that examined current scholarship on the Italian philosopher Giambattista Vico. It was published annually in print and electronic formats by the Philosophy Documentation Center, in cooperation with the Institute for Vico Studies at Emory University. Established in 1983, it ceased publication of new issues in 2010 with the completion of Volume 27 (2009).

== Indexing ==
New Vico Studies is abstracted and indexed in Academic Search Premier, Current Abstracts, Expanded Academic ASAP, Index, Index Philosophicus, Index to Social Sciences & Humanities Proceedings, InfoTrac OneFile, International Bibliography of Periodical Literature (IBZ), International Bibliography of Book Reviews of Scholarly Literature (IBR), MLA International Bibliography, Periodical Index Online, Philosopher's Index, Philosophy Research Index, Reference and Research Book News, Russian Academy of Sciences Bibliographies, and TOC Premier.

== See also ==
- List of philosophy journals
