= Croatian Journal of Philosophy =

- Discipline: Philosophy
- Language: English
- Edited by: Tvrtko Jolić

Publication details
- History: 2001–present
- Publisher: Institute of Philosophy, Zagreb (previously KruZak) (Croatia)
- Frequency: Triannual
- Open access: Yes

Standard abbreviations
- ISO 4: Croat. J. Philos.

Indexing
- ISSN: 1333-1108 (print); 1847-6139 (web)
- OCLC no.: 54118218

Links
- Journal homepage

The Croatian Journal of Philosophy is a peer-reviewed academic journal of philosophy, publishing articles of diverse currents in English. The journal publishes three issues per year with the support of the Republic of Croatia's Ministry of Culture and the Ministry of Science, Education, and Sports. All issues are available in electronic format from the Central and Eastern European Online Library and the Philosophy Documentation Center.

Between 2002 and 2004, the journal published 61 papers, 57 of which (93%) were written by authors outside Croatia.

== Indexing ==
The Croatian Journal of Philosophy is abstracted and indexed in Article@INIST, Arts & Humanities Citation Index, International Bibliography of Book Reviews of Scholarly Literature (IBR), International Bibliography of Periodical Literature (IBZ), The Philosopher's Index, Philosophy Research Index, PhilPapers, SCOPUS, and the Répertoire bibliographique de la philosophie.

== See also ==
- List of philosophy journals

== Sources ==
- Bracanović, Tomislav (June 2005). "Norme i činjenice u hrvatskoj filozofskoj periodici" (PDF). Prolegomena (in Croatian). 4 (1): 157–170. ISSN 1333-4395.
