= Kritike =

- Discipline: Philosophy
- Language: English
- Edited by: Paolo Bolaños and Roland Thauas Pada

Publication details
- History: 2007–present
- Publisher: Department of Philosophy, University of Santo Tomas (Philippines)
- Frequency: Biannually
- Open access: Yes

Standard abbreviations
- ISO 4: Kritike

Indexing
- ISSN: 1908-7330
- OCLC no.: 502390973

Links
- Journal homepage; Online access

Kritike: An Online Journal of Philosophy is a biannual peer-reviewed interdisciplinary journal of philosophy published by the Department of Philosophy of the University of Santo Tomas in Manila, the Philippines. The editors-in-chief are Paolo Bolaños and Roland Theauas Pada. The journal publishes both articles and book reviews. Its focus lies on interdisciplinary approaches to philosophy, especially Filipino philosophy, oriental thought and east–west comparative philosophy, continental philosophy, and Anglo-American philosophy.

Journal articles are published in either English or Filipino.

== Abstracting and indexing ==
The journal is abstracted and indexed in The Philosopher's Index, Web of Science, Scopus, MLA Bibliography, Humanities International Complete, Humanities International Index, International Directory of Philosophy, ASEAN Citation Index, and Directory of Open Access Journals.

== See also ==
- List of philosophy journals
