= Disputatio =

Philosophy journal

- Discipline: Philosophy
- Language: English, Portuguese
- Edited by: Ricardo Santos, Elia Zardini

Publication details
- History: 1996–present
- Publisher: De Gruyter Open / Sciendo (Portugal)
- Open access: Yes

Standard abbreviations
- ISO 4: Disputatio

Indexing
- ISSN: 0873-626X
- LCCN: 2013213514
- OCLC no.: 66394605

Links
- Journal homepage; Online archive

Disputatio is an international journal of philosophy in the analytic tradition. It is currently owned by the Philosophy Centre of the University of Lisbon and managed by the LanCog research group. The journal is a non-profit publishing venture. Since 2013, it has been published exclusively online, as a fully open access journal. Disputatio was founded in 1996 by João Branquinho and published by the Portuguese Philosophical Society until 2004. Former editors include M. S. Lourenço, Fernando Ferreira and João Branquinho, Teresa Marques and Célia Teixeira. Since 2017, the journal has been published by De Gruyter and jointly edited by Ricardo Santos and Elia Zardini.

== Abstracting and indexing ==
The journal is abstracted and indexed in:

- Baidu Scholar
- CNKI Scholar (China National Knowledge Infrastructure)
- CNPIEC
- Dialnet
- Dimensions
- DOAJ (Directory of Open Access Journals)
- EBSCO (relevant databases)
- EBSCO Discovery Service
- ERIH PLUS (European Reference Index for the Humanities and Social Sciences)
- Google Scholar
- J-Gate
- JournalTOCs
- KESLI-NDSL (Korean National Discovery for Science Leaders)
- Latindex
- Naviga (Softweco)
- Philosopher's Index
- PhilPapers
- Primo Central (ExLibris)
- Qualis
- RCAAP
- ReadCube
- SCImago (SJR)
- SCOPUS
- Sherpa/RoMEO
- Summon (Serials Solutions/ProQuest)
- TDNet
- WanFang Data
- WorldCat (OCLC)

== Notable articles ==
- Mark Bevir. 2000. "Narrative as a Form of Explanation."
- Ned Block. 2003. "The Harder Problem of Consciousness."
- Susanne Bobzien. 2014. "Higher-Order Vagueness and Numbers of Distinct Modalities."
- John Broome. 2007. "Is Rationality Normative?"
- Tyler Burge. 2010. "Origins of Perception."
- Susan Carey. 2015. "Why Theories of Concepts Should Not Ignore the Problem of Acquisition."
- David J. Chalmers. 2017. "The Virtual and the Real."
- Daniel Dennett. 1997. "Fé na Verdade."
- Pascal Engel. 2007. "Belief and Normativity."
- Peter van Inwagen. 2014. "Modes of Being and Quantification."
- Christian List. 1999. "Craig's Theorem and the Empirical Underdetermination Thesis Reassessed."
- Kevin Mulligan. 2007. "Intentionality, Knowledge and Formal Objects."
- François Recanati. 2013. "Mental Files: Replies to my Critics."
- John Searle. 1999. "Racionalidade e Realismo. O que está em jogo?"
- John Skorupski. 2007. "What is Normativity?"
- Jason Stanley. 2016. "Is Epistemology Tainted?"
- Wayne Wright. 2003. "McDowell, Demonstrative Concepts, and Nonconceptual Representational Content."
- Jing Zhu. 2004. "Is Conscious Will an Illusion?"

== See also ==
- List of philosophy journals
