= Quodlibet (disambiguation) =

Quodlibet is a musical form that combines several different melodies.

Quodlibet may also refer to:

- Quodlibeta, in Scholastic philosophy, a debate between students and teacher on an unprepared topic
- Quodlibet (architecture), a fanciful form of architectural trompe-l'œil
- Quodlibet (card game), a card game that combines several different contracts
- Quodlibet (journal), an academic journal of Christianity and philosophy
- Quodlibets (1618–1628), by Robert Hayman, believed to be the first English language book written in Canada
- Quod Libet (software), an open-source audio player
- Ex falso quodlibet, the principle of explosion in logic
