= Mikroglottika =

- Discipline: Linguistics
- Language: various

Publication details
- History: 2007 to present
- Publisher: Peter Lang Publishing Group (Switzerland)
- Frequency: Biannual

Standard abbreviations
- ISO 4: Mikroglottika

Indexing
- ISSN: 1988-0863
- OCLC no.: 733132950

Mikroglottika is a linguistic journal about minority languages. Its goal is to promote the study of the philology, phonology, syntax, and lexicon of minority languages, and constructive linguistic studies.

== Editors ==
The journal is edited by Raúl Sánchez Prieto of the University of Salamanca, Daniel Veith of University of Salamanca, and Mikel Martínez Areta of the University of the Basque Country, and published by the Peter Lang Publishing Group.

== Articles ==
Below are some examples of the articles published in Mikroglottika, taken from Mikroglottika Yearbook 2008:

- M. Martínez Areta: La reconstrucción lingüística del proto-vasco: I. Fonética histórica.
- D. Veith: Deutsche Sprache und Kultur in Rolândia. Ergebnisse einer sprachsoziologischen Enquête in Südbrasilien.
- A. Pardo Fernández: El Llïonés y la TICs and Linguistica contrastiva italiano-leonese: vocalismo.
- F. Sánchez: Diccionario de la variante leonesa de Las Arribes. Primer esbozo de la letra A.
- R. Sánchez Prieto: La elaboración y aceptación de una norma lingüística en pequeñas comunidades dialectalmente divididas: el caso del leonés y del frisio del norte and Die Wortbildung im Luxemburgischen.
- F. Schanen: Nominale Pluralbildung im Lëtzebuergëschen und Deutschen.
- D. Hernández: Ukrainian multilingualism and the lingering question of 'Ukrainization'. A view in perspective.
