= Journal of Information Ethics =

- Discipline: Information science
- Language: English
- Edited by: R. Hauptmann

Publication details
- History: 1992–Present
- Publisher: McFarland & Company
- Frequency: Biannually

Standard abbreviations
- ISO 4: J. Inf. Ethics

Indexing
- ISSN: 1061-9321 (print); 1941-2894 (web)

Links
- Journal homepage

The Journal of Information Ethics is an academic journal of philosophy. The editor-in-chief is Robert Hauptmann. It has been published biannually since 1992 by McFarland & Company and the Center for Art and Media Karlsruhe. The publisher description of editorial content reads:"From the ethics of Caller ID to transmission of sexually explicit materials via Internet, the information age presents a barrage of ethical challenges. In this acclaimed twice-yearly journal, some of the brightest and most influential figures in the information sciences confront a broad range of these transdisciplinary issues."

According to Ulrich's Periodicals Directory, it "deals with ethical issues in all of the information sciences, from library acquisitions to database management, with a multidisciplinary approach."

== Review and indexes ==
According to the publisher's web site, the journal has been reviewed by Library Journal, Choice: Current Reviews for Academic Libraries, Special Libraries, and Library and Information Science Annual.

It is abstracted and indexed in Library Literature, Library, Information Science & Technology Abstracts, Scopus, PubMed, ATLA Religion, and The Philosophers' Index.

== See also ==
- List of philosophy journals
