= Polish Journal of Philosophy =

- Discipline: Philosophy
- Language: English
- Edited by: Sebastian Tomasz Kolodziejczyk

Publication details
- History: 2007–present
- Publisher: Institute of Philosophy, Jagiellonian University (Poland)
- Frequency: Biannual

Standard abbreviations
- ISO 4: Pol. J. Philos.

Indexing
- ISSN: 1897-1652 (print); 2154-3747 (web)
- LCCN: 2007-224050
- OCLC no.: 137334904

Links
- Journal homepage; Online access

The Polish Journal of Philosophy is a peer-reviewed academic journal that publishes original articles, reviews, and other items to promote continuing philosophical scholarship in Poland. It is published in English. Notable contributors include Peter Baumann, Arkadiusz Chrudzimski, Susan Haack, Dale Jacquette, Stephen Palmquist, Roberto Poli, Władysław Stróżewski, and Jan Woleński. The scope of the journal includes both the phenomenological school of Roman Ingarden and the Lvov-Warsaw school of analytic philosophy. The Polish Journal of Philosophy is edited and published at the Institute of Philosophy, Jagiellonian University in Kraków, Poland. All issues are available online from the Philosophy Documentation Center.

== See also ==
- List of philosophy journals
