= Kierkegaard Studies Yearbook =

- Discipline: Philosophy
- Language: English; French; German
- Edited by: Heiko Schulz; Jon Stewart; Karl Verstrynge

Publication details
- History: 1996–present
- Publisher: Walter de Gruyter on behalf of the Søren Kierkegaard Research Center
- Frequency: Annual

Standard abbreviations
- ISO 4: Kierkegaard Stud. Yearb.

Indexing
- ISSN: 1430-5372 (print); 1612-9792 (web)
- OCLC no.: 231699094

Links
- Journal homepage; Journal page at publisher's website; Online access

Kierkegaard Studies Yearbook is a peer-reviewed academic journal of philosophy covering scholarly examination of Søren Kierkegaard's thought and edited by Heiko Schulz, Jon Stewart, and Karl Verstrynge. The journal publishes in English, French, and German. The journal was established in 1996 and is published by Walter de Gruyter on behalf of the International Kierkegaard Society.

== See also ==
- List of philosophy journals
