= A. H. Armstrong =

English educator and author (1909–1997)

Arthur Hilary Armstrong, FBA (13 August 1909 – 16 October 1997) was an English educator and author. Armstrong is recognized as one of the foremost authorities on the philosophical teachings of Plotinus (ca. 205–270 CE). His multi-volume translation of the philosopher's teachings is regarded as an essential tool of classical studies.

== Life ==
Hilary Armstrong was born in Hove, England. He was the son of W. A. (clergyman) and E. Cripps Armstrong. He married Deborah Wilson in 1933. They had two sons and three daughters. He received a B.A. from Jesus College, Cambridge in 1932 and his M.A. in 1935. He was made a fellow of the British Academy in 1970 and a fellow in the American Catholic Philosophical Association.

== Academia ==
Armstrong began his teaching career in 1936 at University College, Swansea, Wales. His tenure at the university lasted until 1939. He then began teaching at the Royal University of Malta in Valletta as a professor of classics. In 1943, he became a classical sixth form master at Beaumont College, Old Windsor, Berkshire, England. Three years later, in 1946, he relocated to Cardiff University to take up the position of lecturer in Latin. From 1950 to 1972 he served as the Gladstone Professor of Greek at University of Liverpool in Liverpool, England, being appointed professor emeritus upon retirement in 1972.

From 1970 to 1971, Armstrong was a Killam Senior Fellow at Dalhousie University in Halifax, Nova Scotia, Canada. He held a visiting professorship of classics and philosophy at the university from 1972. He was also named a visiting professor at Manhattanville College in 1966. He was a founding editor of Dionysius, together with J. A. Doull and R. D. Crouse.

According to A A Long, "Armstrong changed the subject of ancient philosophy by devoting much of his long life to promoting study of the Neoplatonist philosopher Plotinus". A A Long also commented that "as well as being a leading scholar of ancient philosophy, Armstrong was a devout, active, and increasingly idiosyncratic Christian; or perhaps better, a free-thinking Christian Platonist. His religious outlook, catholic with a small c (though he espoused Roman Catholicism for much of his life), consistently informed his view of Plotinus."

In 1973, he was awarded the Aquinas Medal from the American Catholic Philosophical Association.

== Works ==
- The Architecture of the Intelligible Universe in the Philosophy of Plotinus: An Analytical and Historical Study, Cambridge University Press, 1940.
- Plotinus, (as Translator) Allen & Unwin, 1953, Collier, 1962. In 2012 this was reissued in electronic form.
- An Introduction to Ancient Philosophy, Methuen, 1947, 4th edition, Methuen, 1966.
- Christian Faith and Greek Philosophy, (with R. A. Markus) Darton, Longman & Todd, 1960, Sheed, 1964.
- Re-discovering Eastern Christendom: Essays in Commemoration of Dom Bede Winslow, (Editor with E.J.B. Fry), Darton, Longman & Todd, 1963.
- Plotinus, seven volumes, (as Translator), Harvard University Press, 1966–1988.
- St. Augustine and Christian Platonism, Villanova University Press, 1967.
- The Cambridge History of Later Greek and Early Medieval Philosophy, (as Editor), Cambridge University Press, 1967.
- The Church of England, the Methodists and Society: 1700 to 1850, Rowman & Littlefield, 1973.
- Greek philosophy and Christianity, in The Legacy of Greece, a New appraisal (Moses I Finley Editor), Clarendon Press, Oxford, 1981.

== Journals ==
- Classical Quarterly
- Mind
- Journal of Hellenic Studies
- Journal of Theological Studies
- Downside Review
- Dionysius

== See also ==
- John M. Dillon
- Stephen MacKenna
