= Richard H. Lineback =

- Born: 1936 (age 89–90)
- Occupations: President and Founder of The Philosopher's Information Center

Richard H. Lineback (born 1936) is president and Founder of the Philosopher's Information Center, Founder and Editor of The Philosopher's Index, and is professor emeritus in the Department of Philosophy at Bowling Green State University, Bowling Green, Ohio.

== Education ==
Lineback graduated from Western Hills High School in 1954. He then earned his BA from University of Cincinnati in 1958 and Ph.D. in philosophy from Indiana University Bloomington in 1963. He later received specialized training in medical ethics at the Dartmouth-Hitchcock Medical Center. Lineback is professor emeritus in the Department of Philosophy at Bowling Green State University, where he principally taught medical ethics for 35 years. He also taught medical ethics at the Medical College of Ohio School of Nursing. He served on numerous hospital ethics committees in Ohio, including Riverside Hospital in Toledo, Ohio, Flower Hospital in Sylvania, Ohio and Riverside Methodist Hospital in Columbus, Ohio where he consulted for over 20 years.

== Career ==
Dr. Richard H. Lineback is president of the Philosopher's Information Center, publisher of The Philosopher’s Index. Lineback founded The Philosopher's Index in 1966, and subsequently established the Philosopher's Information Center in 1967 and the Philosophy Documentation Center in 1970. As director of both centers, he served as editor of The Philosopher’s Index, coeditor of the International Directory of Philosophy and Philosophers, assistant editor of the Directory of American Philosophers, and general editor of the book series Bibliographies of Famous Philosophers. Lineback still serves as president of the Philosopher's Information Center and editor of The Philosopher’s Index.

Notable for his broad range of academic interests that in addition to philosophy include computer and information science, Dr. Lineback served as a consultant to the National Endowment for the Humanities and the Kennedy Institute of Ethics, among other national organizations. He served as president of the Association of Philosophy Journal Editors and president of the National Federation of Advanced Information Services (NFAIS). He had the honor of being a delegate to the White House Conference on Library and Information Sciences and is an honorary fellow of NFAIS.
