= Journal for the History of Analytical Philosophy =

- Discipline: Philosophy
- Language: English
- Edited by: Marcus Rossberg

Publication details
- History: 2011–present
- Publisher: McMaster University Library Press
- Frequency: Monthly

Standard abbreviations
- ISO 4: J. Hist. Anal. Philos.

Indexing
- ISSN: 2159-0303

Links
- Journal homepage; Online archive

The Journal for the History of Analytical Philosophy is a peer-reviewed open access academic journal. It publishes research articles on the history of analytic philosophy. It is published by McMaster University Library Press and was established in 2011. The editor-in-chief is Marcus Rossberg (University of Connecticut). The journal is indexed by The Philosophers' Index, PhilPapers, and Scopus.
