= Graduate Faculty Philosophy Journal =

- Discipline: Philosophy
- Language: English
- Edited by: Lena Nowak-Laird, Hannah Scharmer, and Andrew Shoffner

Publication details
- History: 1972–present
- Publisher: Philosophy Documentation Center (United States)
- Frequency: Biannual

Standard abbreviations
- ISO 4: Grad. Fac. Philos. J.

Indexing
- ISSN: 0093-4240 (print); 2153-9197 (web)
- LCCN: 74-642242
- OCLC no.: 2546864

Links
- Journal homepage; Online access

The Graduate Faculty Philosophy Journal is an academic journal sponsored by the philosophy department of The New School in New York City. The focus of this journal is recent European work in phenomenology, hermeneutics, critical theory, and the history of philosophy. The journal is edited by a committee of graduate philosophy students at The New School. It is published twice yearly on a non-profit basis in cooperation with the Philosophy Documentation Center. All issues are available online.

== See also ==
- List of philosophy journals
