= Études phénoménologiques =

Études Phénoménologiques
- Discipline: Philosophy
- Language: English, French
- Edited by: Pol Vandevelde and Danielle Lories

Publication details
- History: 1985–2008; 2017-present
- Publisher: Peeters (Belgium)
- Frequency: Annual

Standard abbreviations
- ISO 4: Études Phénoménol.

Indexing
- ISSN: 0773-7912 (print); 2033-656X (web)
- OCLC no.: 12876393

Links
- Journal homepage

Études Phénoménologiques (English: Phenomenological Studies) is a yearly peer-reviewed academic journal originally published in French by Éditions Ousia. The journal was founded in 1985 by Jacques Taminiaux edited it until its closure in 2008.

In 2017, the publication was rebooted by the Centre d'Études Phénoménologiques of the Université catholique de Louvain in Belgium and by the Department of Philosophy at Marquette University, in Milwaukee, USA. The reboot is published by Peeters and edited by Pol Vandevelde and Danielle Lories.

== See also ==
- List of philosophy journals
