= Comparative and Continental Philosophy =

- Discipline: Philosophy
- Language: English
- Edited by: David Jones

Publication details
- History: 2009–present
- Publisher: Taylor & Francis
- Frequency: triannually

Standard abbreviations
- ISO 4: Comp. Cont. Philos.

Indexing
- ISSN: 1757-0638 (print); 1757-0646 (web)

Links
- Journal homepage

Comparative and Continental Philosophy is a peer-reviewed and fully refereed journal that appears tri-annually and publishes leading edge papers covering different areas of continental philosophy. It is published by Comparative and Continental Philosophy Circle and is included in ATLA Religion Database, ATLASerials (ATLAS) and The Philosopher's Index.

== See also ==
- List of philosophy journals
