= Anuario Filosófico =

Anuario Filosófico is a triannual peer-reviewed academic journal of philosophy. It was established in 1968 and is published by the Philosophy Department of the University of Navarra in Spanish. The editor-in-chief is Montserrat Herrero of the same university.

== Abstracting and indexing ==
The journal is abstracted and indexed in:

- L'Année Philologique
- Arts & Humanities Citation Index
- FRANCIS
- International Bibliography of Periodical Literature in the Humanities and Social Sciences
- Linguistics and Language Behavior Abstracts
- Philosopher's Index
- Philosophy Research Index
- Revue d'Histoire Ecclesiastique
- Scopus
