= Philosophical Topics =

- Discipline: Philosophy
- Language: English
- Edited by: Ashley Purdy

Publication details
- Former name: The Southwestern Journal of Philosophy
- History: 1981–present
- Publisher: University of Arkansas Press for the Department of Philosophy, J. William Fulbright College of Arts and Sciences, University of Arkansas (United States)
- Frequency: Biannual

Standard abbreviations
- ISO 4: Philos. Top.

Indexing
- ISSN: 0276-2080 (print); 2154-154X (web)
- LCCN: 82-643558
- OCLC no.: 7322398

Links
- Journal homepage; Online access

Philosophical Topics is a peer-reviewed academic journal covering all major areas of philosophy. Each thematic issue consists entirely of invited papers. Recent issues have been concerned with perception, agency, modern philosophy, identity, and free will. The journal is published by the University of Arkansas philosophy department and the University of Arkansas Press. The editor-in-chief is Ashley Purdy.

Philosophical Topics was established in 1970 as The Southwestern Journal of Philosophy and obtained its current title in 1981. All issues of both journals are available in electronic format from the Philosophy Documentation Center.

== See also ==
- List of philosophy journals and philosophy
