= Kierkegaard Studies Monograph Series =

- Discipline: Philosophy
- Language: English, French, German
- Edited by: Heiko Schulz, Jon Stewart, Karl Verstrynge

Publication details
- History: 1997–present
- Publisher: Walter de Gruyter on behalf of the Søren Kierkegaard Research Center
- Frequency: Biannual

Standard abbreviations
- ISO 4: Kierkegaard Stud. Monogr. Ser.

Indexing
- ISSN: 1434-2952
- OCLC no.: 612314251

Links
- Journal homepage; Journal page at publisher's website

Kierkegaard Studies Monograph Series is a peer-reviewed monographic series of philosophy covering Søren Kierkegaard's thought and edited by Heiko Schulz, Jon Stewart, and Karl Verstrynge. The series publishes in English, French, and German. It was established in 1997 and is published by Walter de Gruyter on behalf of the International Kierkegaard Society.

== See also ==
- List of philosophy journals
