= Levinas Studies =

- Discipline: philosophy
- Language: English
- Edited by: Robert Bernasconi

Publication details
- History: 2005–present
- Publisher: Philosophy Documentation Center (United States)
- Frequency: Annual

Standard abbreviations
- ISO 4: Levinas Stud.

Indexing
- ISSN: 1554-7000 (print); 2153-8433 (web)
- LCCN: 2005-213329
- JSTOR: levinasstudies
- OCLC no.: 57677600

Links
- Journal homepage; Online access

Levinas Studies is a peer-reviewed academic journal dedicated to scholarly work on the thought of Emmanuel Levinas. Notable contributors include Lisa Guenther, Jean-Luc Marion, Adriaan T. Peperzak, Anthony Steinbock, and Jacques Taminiaux. It was established in 2005 by Duquesne University Press and has been published by the Philosophy Documentation Center since 2017. It is indexed in ERIH PLUS, Humanities Source, Humanities International Index, Humanities International Complete, and The Philosopher's Index. It is available on Project MUSE and archive volumes are available on JSTOR. Levinas Studies is edited by Robert Bernasconi at Pennsylvania State University.

== See also ==
- List of philosophy journals
