= Fichte-Studien =

- Discipline: Philosophy
- Language: English, French, German
- Edited by: Matteo Vincenzo d'Alfonso, Alexander Schnell

Publication details
- History: 1990–present
- Frequency: Annually
- ISO 4: Find out here

Indexing
- ISSN: 0925-0166 (print); 1879-5811 (web)

Links
- Journal homepage

Fichte-Studien (Fichte Studies) is a journal dedicated to promoting the works of Johann Gottlieb Fichte.

== History ==
The Internationale Johann-Gottlieb-Fichte-Gesellschaft (International Johann Gottlieb Fichte Society) was founded in 1987 and since 1990 it publishes the journal founded by Klaus Hammacher, Richard Schottky and Wolfgang Schrader.

== Indexing and abstracting ==
The journal is indexed by Scopus, IBZ Online and the Philosopher's Index.
