= Proceedings of the International Association for Business and Society =

- Discipline: Business ethics, Corporate social responsibility
- Language: English
- Edited by: Jamie R. Hendry and Anne Barraquier

Publication details
- History: 1990–present
- Publisher: Philosophy Documentation Center (United States)
- Frequency: Annual

Standard abbreviations
- ISO 4: Proc. Int. Assoc. Bus. Soc.

Indexing
- ISSN: 2155-2568 (print); 2160-6900 (web)
- OCLC no.: 30996365

Links
- Journal homepage; Online access

The Proceedings of the International Association for Business and Society is an annual series that publishes a selection of the peer-reviewed papers presented at the association's annual conference.

== About ==
Each volume contains papers in the following areas:

- Business Ethics
- Corporate Social Responsibility and Social Performance
- Environmental Management and Regulation
- Corporate Governance Issues
- Stakeholder Issues and Theory
- Public Affairs and Public Policy
- Teaching and Research Issues

The International Association for Business and Society is a learned society that supports research and teaching about the relationships between business, government, and society. It has published these Proceedings for its members since 1990, first in print format and then on CD-ROM. The series is now only published in electronic format, and volumes 16 (2005) to the present are available online from the Philosophy Documentation Center. Contributors include Donna Wood, Duane Windsor, James Weber, Steven Wartick, Mark Starik, Sanjay Sharma, Kathleen Rehbein, Gordon Rands, Robert Phillips, John Mahon, Jeanne Logsdon, Anne Lawrence, Bryan Husted, and Virginia Gerde.
