= Werner Beierwaltes =

German academic (1931–2019)

Werner Beierwaltes (8 May 1931, Klingenberg am Main – 22 February 2019, Würzburg) was a German academic best known as a historian of philosophy. His most important areas of specialization were Neoplatonism and German Idealism. He was an Emeritus Professor of Philosophy at LMU Munich.

His many books include Proklos: Grundzuge seiner Metaphysik, Denken des Einen: Studien zur neuplatonischen Philosophie und ihrer Wirkungsgeschichte, Eriugena: Grundzuge seines Denkens, Platonismus im Christentum, and Platonismus und Idealismus. He was among the original Editorial Advisors of the scholarly journal Dionysius, in which English-language examples of his writings may be found. He was also a member of the Editorial Board of the International Journal of Philosophical Studies, Quaestio, and Anuario Filosófico. In 1980, he delivered the Saint Augustine Lecture (his topic was Augustine's concept of happiness) at Villanova University, where it is presented annually by the Institute for the Study of Augustine and Augustinian Traditions.

He was a Member of the Bavarian Academy of Sciences and Humanities from 1986 and a Member of the Royal Irish Academy. He was in addition admitted to the Order of Merit of the Federal Republic of Germany and the Bavarian Order of Merit.
