= James E. Faulconer =

American philosopher

James E. Faulconer is an American philosopher, a former Richard L. Evans Professor of Philosophy at Brigham Young University, the former director of BYU's London Centre, a Fellow at the Wheatley Institution (and its former associate director), and a senior research fellow at the Maxwell Institute for Religious Scholarship. He previously served as the dean of undergraduate education and the chair of the Philosophy Department at BYU.

== Biography ==
Faulconer was born 27 September 1947 in Warrensburg, MO, USA, his family being from the nearby small towns of Knob Noster and Lamont. His father spent his career in the U.S. Army, so Faulconer lived for substantial periods of his life in Germany, Korea, and several U.S. states. He graduated from high school in Korea and later lived in Korea as a missionary for two and one-half years (March 1967–September 1969).

Faulconer met and married Janice Kay Allen in 1971. They have four children (Christian, Matthew, Rebecca, and Elisabeth) and thirteen grandchildren.

Faulconer received his B.A. in English from BYU. He then received master's and Ph.D. degrees in philosophy from Pennsylvania State University. His area of interest in philosophy is contemporary European philosophy, particularly the work of Martin Heidegger and late 20th- and early 21st-century French thinkers, particularly as that work bears on religious experience. Faulconer was the founding editor of Epoché: A Journal for the History of Philosophy. He was a visiting professor at the Higher Institute for Philosophy, Catholic University of Leuven (1995–96) and a visiting researcher in the library of the École Normale Supérieur (2000–2001).

Faulconer is a member of the Church of Jesus Christ of Latter-day Saints. He is also a member of the United States Democratic Party, where he has served as a district chairperson.

== Bibliography ==
=== Author ===
- Introduction to Logic, with Dennis J. Packard. D. Van Nostrand, 1980. 417 pages.
- Tools for Scripture Study. Provo, Utah: FARMS, 1999. 156 pages.
- Romans 1: Notes and Reflections. Provo, Utah: FARMS, 1999. 142 pages.
- Faith, Philosophy, Scripture. Provo, Utah: Maxwell Institute, 2010. 254 pages.
- The Life of Holiness: Notes and Reflections on Romans 1, 5-8. Provo, UT: Maxwell Institute, 2012. 497 pages.
- The Doctrine and Covenants Made Harder: Study Questions. Salem, OR: Salt Press, 2013. 285 pages.
- The Old Testament Made Harder: Study Questions. Provo, UT: Maxwell Institute, 2015. 640 pages.
- The Book of Mormon Made Harder: Study Questions. Provo, UT: Maxwell Institute, 2014. 382 pages.
- The New Testament Made Harder: Study Questions. Provo, UT: Maxwell Institute, 2015. 518 pages.
- Mosiah: a short theological introduction. Provo, UT: Maxwell Institute, 2020. 136 pages.
- Thinking Otherwise: Theological Explorations of Joseph Smith's Revelations. Provo, UT: Maxwell Institute, 2020. 175 pages.

=== Editor ===
- Reconsidering Psychology: Perspectives from Contemporary Continental Philosophy. Ed. with R. N. Williams. Pittsburgh: Duquesne University Press. 1990. 262 pages.
- Appropriating Heidegger. Ed. with Mark W. Wrathall. Cambridge: Cambridge University Press, 2000. 214 pages
- Transcendence in Religion and Philosophy. Editor. Indianapolis: Indiana University Press, 2003. 151 pages.
- Common Ground -- Different Opinions: Latter-day Saints and Contemporary Issues. Ed. with Justin White. Salt Lake City, UT: Kofford. 2013, 379 pages.
- Perspectives on Mormon Theology: Scriptural Theology. Ed. with Joseph M. Spencer. Salt Lake City, UT: Kofford. 2015, 211 pages.

== Sources ==
- Amazon.com listing
- Maxwell Institute bio
