= Teach For America Counter-Narratives =

- Editor: T. Jameson Brewer, Kathleen deMarrais
- Language: English
- Publisher: Peter Lang
- Publication date: June 2015
- Publication place: United States
- ISBN: 1433128764

Teach For America Counter-Narratives: Alumni Speak Up and Speak Out (ISBN 1433128764) is an edited book containing 20 counter-narratives about Teach For America (TFA). The volume was edited by T. Jameson Brewer and Kathleen deMarrais and was published by Peter Lang in June 2015.

Each chapter, written by TFA alumni, sheds new light on the once-celebrated organization. With narratives covering the entire span of TFA's 25 years of operations, the chapters are organized into three broad categories: (1) TFA's Recruitment, Training, and Support Structure; (2) TFA's Approach to Diversity; and (3) TFA's Approach to Criticism and Critics.

== Recognition and stories ==
Teach For America Counter-Narratives has been featured in the following: National Public Radio (NPR), NPR Illinois, NonProfit Quarterly, The Washington Post, The Huffington Post, Esther Cepeda's Nationally Syndicated Column, AlterNet, The Daily Beast, Living in Dialogue, Jacobin, Atlanta Backstar, and The Chronicle of Philanthropy. Teach For America Counter-Narratives was also listed as one of Teaching for Change's Favorite Books of 2015.
