= Nick D'Aloisio =

Programmer, entrepreneur

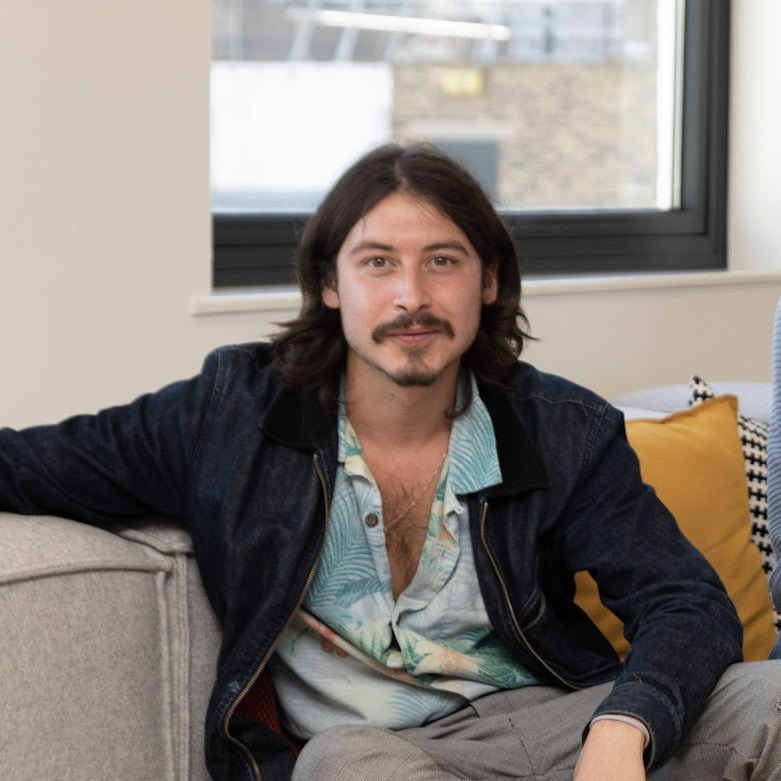
- Born: Nicholas D'Aloisio-Montilla; 1 November 1995 (age 31); Melbourne, Australia
- Education: King's College School, University of Oxford
- Occupations: Computer programmer, Internet entrepreneur, philosopher, student (Hertford College, University of Oxford)
- Known for: Summly

Nicholas D'Aloisio (born 1 November 1995) is a British computer programmer and internet entrepreneur. He is the founder of Summly, a mobile app which automatically summarises news articles and other material, which was acquired by Yahoo for $30M, according to allthingsd.com, but the price wasn't officially disclosed. D'Aloisio is the youngest person to receive a round of venture capital in technology, at the age of 16. D'Aloisio was more recently the founder of a startup called Sphere that was acquired by Twitter in October 2021 for an undisclosed sum, and received $30M of venture capital investment from Index Ventures and Mike Moritz. He is also a student at Oxford University, where he graduated from the BPhil in Philosophy in July 2021 and now is undertaking the PhD (DPhil) course. D'Aloisio has had seven papers accepted for publication or revision & resubmission in peer-reviewed journals.

== Early life and education ==
D'Aloisio was born in Melbourne, Australia. Having spent some years there, D’Aloisio left Australia for the United Kingdom at the age of seven with his lawyer mother and banker father, when they returned to London. D'Aloisio was educated at King's College School, an independent school for boys in Wimbledon, south west London. In the summer of 2014, he took A-level examinations at King's College School, Wimbledon. From 2014, D'Aloisio studied his undergraduate degree in philosophy and computer science at Hertford College, Oxford University. In 2019, he commenced the BPhil graduate programme in Philosophy at Oxford University, and then advanced onto the DPhil (PhD) course in 2021.

Since 2017, D'Aloisio has published a number of academic papers in peer-reviewed journals. One of them, titled "Imagery and Overflow: We See More Than We Report", was published in Philosophical Psychology He presented a second paper at the Centre for Philosophical Psychology, University of Antwerp. A third paper was published in the philosophy journal Ratio, and three more papers were accepted for publication in the peer-reviewed journals Philosophia, Disputatio and Phenomenology and the Cognitive Sciences.

== Career ==
=== Summly ===
In March 2011, D'Aloisio launched an iOS app named Trimit, which used an algorithm to condense text such as emails and blog posts into a summary of 1000, 500, or 140-character text. With 100,000 downloads, the app was featured as on the Apple App Store. Shortly afterwards, Trimit attracted the attention of business magnate Li Ka-Shing, who provided 16-year-old D'Aloisio with US$300,000 in venture capital investment. After gathering feedback, D'Aloisio re-designed the app and renamed it Summly in December 2011.

Summly aimed to solve perceived problems with the way news articles are presented on smartphones, with the initial version of Summly being downloaded by over 200,000 users. He hired a team from Israel, including a scientist named Inderjeet Mani, who specialised in natural language processing, to improve the app. With corporate support, in November 2012, D'Aloisio received US$1 million in new venture funding from celebrities such as Yoko Ono, Ashton Kutcher and Stephen Fry, in addition to Li Ka-Shing. In March 2013, D'Aloiso sold Summly to Yahoo! for approximately US$30 million, according to allthingsd.com, but price wasn't officially disclosed. He joined Yahoo! as a product manager the same month.

The Summly algorithm first decides whether a document is summarizable by using a classifier model that is trained on a dataset of summarizable documents and unsummarizable documents (such as works of fiction). Then, a scoring system is used to identity and prune uninformative and incoherent sentences until the summary drops below the word limit. The coherence score is obtained by assigning weights to the presence of features in the sentence. For short summaries, the informativeness score of a sentence is determined by language-independent features such as its position or length. For longer summaries, a support vector machine learns to detect sentences with the highest ROUGE-1 scores. For other summaries, a random walk is used to determine salient nodes in a graph (a la PageRank) where sentences are represented as nodes with exponentially decreasing weights for those that appear later.

=== Yahoo News Digest ===
In January 2014, D'Aloisio announced the launch of Yahoo News Digest at the Consumer Electronics Show in Las Vegas. An evolution of Summly, Yahoo News Digest provides mobile users with a summary of important news of the day in the form of a twice-a-day digest. The articles are automatically and manually curated, as well as summarised into key units of information, known as "Atoms", which include maps, infographics, quotes and Wikipedia extracts. The Verge praised the app, stating, "Yahoo! News Digest is the boldest and most visually impressive app the company has released since Yahoo! Weather last year." It was the winner of the 2014 Apple Design Award. D'Aloisio resigned from Yahoo! in October 2015.

=== Sphere ===
In late 2015, D'Aloisio co-founded a new startup called Sphere Knowledge with Tomas Halgas, who he met at Oxford. Whilst yet to be made public, Sphere is said to be knowledge-sharing service where users can swap information via instant messaging. As of March 2019, the Financial Times reports that the company has raised US$30 million. In October 2021, multiple news outlets including TechCrunch, The Telegraph, The Times and BBC reported that Sphere had been acquired by Twitter, and that the majority of the 30-person team would be joining the company.

== Awards and recognition ==
D'Aloisio garnered media attention for being a young entrepreneur. He has been covered by major publications, including ReadWrite, Business Insider, Wired, Forbes, The Huffington Post and TechCrunch. D'Aloisio has also made numerous television appearances.

In 2013, The Wall Street Journal awarded D'Aloisio "Innovator of the Year" in New York City for his work on Summly and at Yahoo. He was included in Time magazine's Time 100 as one of the world's most influential teenagers. He also appeared in the 30 Under 30, an annual list of top entrepreneurs by Forbes, and appeared in GQ magazine's 100 Most Connected Men of 2014. D'Aloisio was placed No. 30 on the 2014 Silicon Valley 100 by Business Insider. He won a Spirit of London Award in December 2012 as Entrepreneur of the Year. In addition, he was placed No. 1 in London's Evening Standard Top 25 under 25 for 2013. D'Aloisio also received 2013's Entrepreneur of the Year by Spear's Wealth Management, as well as a Merton Business Award.

== See also ==
- News aggregator
- Multi-document summarization
- Text mining
