= Erasmus Journal for Philosophy and Economics =

- Discipline: Economics, History, Philosophy
- Language: English

Publication details
- History: 2008–present
- Publisher: Stichting Erasmus
- Frequency: Biannual
- Open access: Yes

Standard abbreviations
- ISO 4: Erasmus J. Philos. Econ.

Indexing
- ISSN: 1876-9098

Links
- Journal homepage

The Erasmus Journal for Philosophy and Economics (EJPE) is a peer-reviewed open access interdisciplinary journal of philosophy, history, and economics. It is supported by the Erasmus Institute for Philosophy and Economics of Erasmus University Rotterdam, and is published twice a year. The journal also hosts the Mark Blaug Prize in Philosophy and Economics, awarded to a graduate student or recent graduate.

== Abstracting and indexing ==
The journal is abstracted and indexed in ABI/INFORM, Business Source Premier, Business Source Elite, EconLit, Philosopher's Index, and Scopus.

== See also ==
- List of economics journals
- List of history journals
- List of philosophy journals
