= Jana Sawicki =

American philosopher, academic, and author

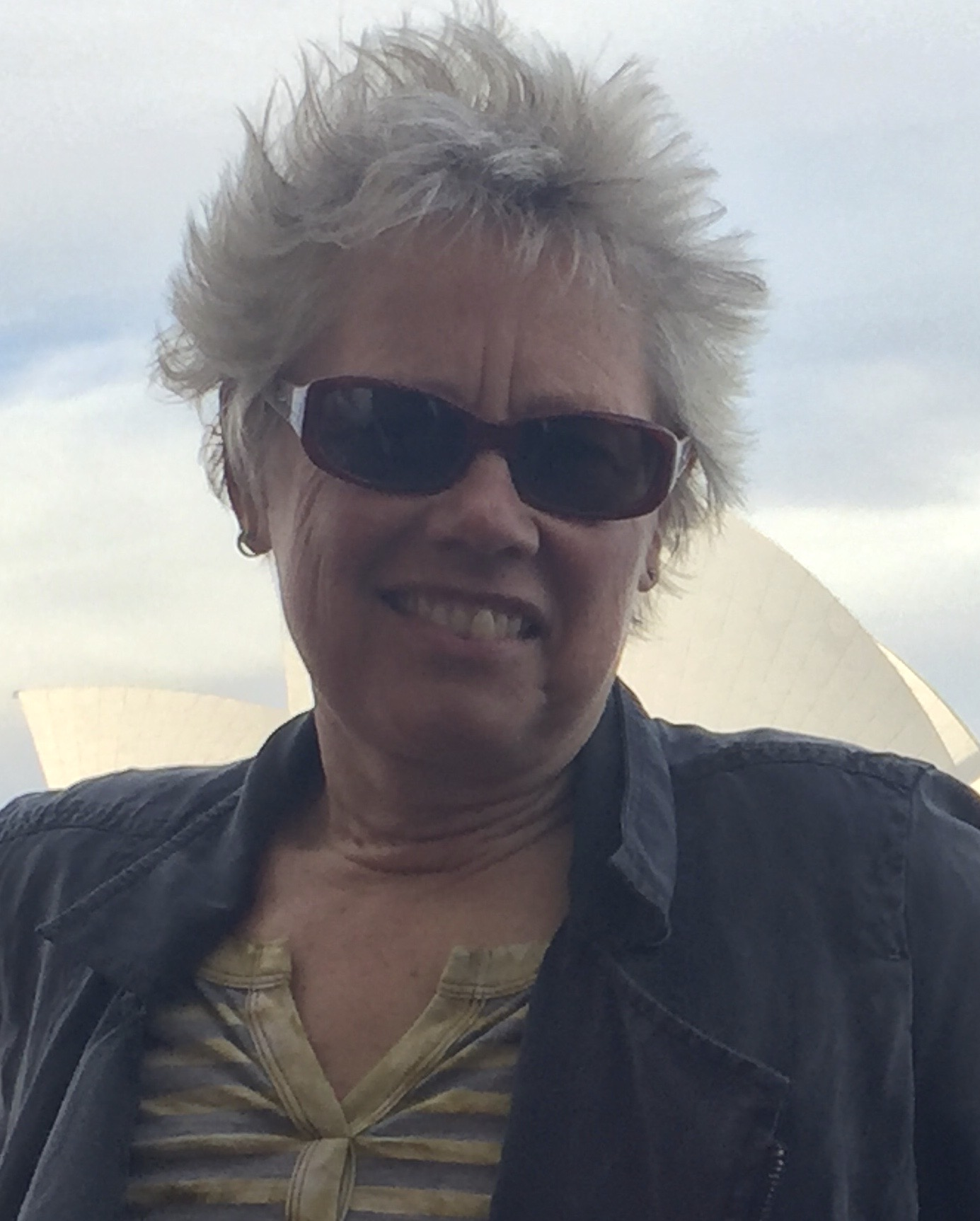
- Sawicki in 2016
- Occupations: Philosopher, academic, and author

Academic background
- Education: B.A. M.A. M. Phil. Ph.D.
- Alma mater: Sweet Briar College; Columbia University

Academic work
- Institutions: Williams College

Jana Sawicki is an American philosopher, academic, and author. She is the Morris Professor of Rhetoric at Williams College.

Sawicki's work spans continental philosophy, Foucault, critical theory, social and political philosophy, and Feminist theory and queer theory. She co-edited A Foucault Companion with Timothy O'Leary and Chris Falzon, and a special issue on Foucault and Queer Theory with Shannon Winnubst, as well as authored a book Disciplining Foucault: Feminism, Power, and the Body.

== Education and early career ==
Sawicki graduated with a B.A. in Philosophy from Sweet Briar College in 1974. She earned an M.A. from Columbia University in 1977, where she also served as a Preceptor. She completed her M.Phil. in 1978, before receiving her Ph.D. from Columbia University in 1981.

== Career ==
From 1981 to 1987, Sawicki served as an Assistant Professor of Philosophy at the University of Maine and a Visiting Scholar at the Massachusetts Institute of Technology between 1987 and 1988. She then worked as an Associate Professor of Philosophy at the University of Maine, a position she held from 1987 to 1991. Subsequently, she joined Williams College, initially serving as a Visiting Associate Professor for a year, before becoming an Associate Professor for the next three years. She also chaired the Women's and Gender Studies Department from 1993 to 2003, concurrently serving as a Professor of Philosophy and Women's Studies from 1995 to 2003, and was appointed to the W. Van Alan Clark Third Century Professorship from 2002 to 2008.

Sawicki chaired the Department of Philosophy at Williams College from 2003 to 2009 and held the Carl W. Vogt '58 Professorship of Philosophy from 2008 to 2017. Between 2015 and 2018, she directed the Oakley Center for Humanities and Social Sciences, followed by an appointment as the Chair of the Philosophy Department until 2022. She has been serving as the Morris Professor of Rhetoric there since 2017.

== Works ==
In 1991, Sawicki authored Disciplining Foucault: Feminism, Power, and the Body, in which she advocated for the possibility of Foucauldian feminism and critiqued the idea of total power within phallocentric discourse. Lauren Rabinovitz remarked that this book "provides students new to Foucault's work with a helpful introduction to his concepts." Similarly, Stephen Katz lauded the book as "persuasive and well-elucidated," positioning it as an accessible entry point into the intersection of feminism and Foucault's philosophy. In 2013, she co-edited A Companion to Foucault, a collection of essays that analyzed Foucault's works and engaged with his lecture courses. Ansgar Allen, in his review of this book, called it "an essential tool for future Foucault scholars."

Sawicki has engaged with Michel Foucault's ideas and published an article titled "Foucault and Feminism: Toward a Politics of Difference" in her earlier scholarship, where she applied his methods to explore how embracing difference challenged feminist theory, critiqued the concepts of the revolutionary subject and social totality, and analyzed debates on sexuality and reproductive technologies. Further, she examined Foucault's relevance in rethinking feminism amid neoliberal governmentality, incorporating his work with Eve Kosofsky Sedgwick's queer feminist perspective to address skepticism about Foucault's ethics. She also contributed to Biopower: Foucault and Beyond, authoring a chapter titled "Precarious Life: Butler and Foucault on Biopolitics," which explored the intersection of biopower, vulnerability, and the normative foundation of critique.

In addition to her books, Sawicki has authored numerous influential articles and book chapters that have shaped contemporary feminist and continental philosophical discourse. Her 1986 essay, “Foucault and Feminism: Toward a Politics of Difference,” published in Hypatia, applied Foucault’s methods to argue that emphasizing differences among women challenges unified feminist theory and reconsiders debates on sexuality, reproductive technologies, and political subjectivity.

In 2013, she published “Queer Feminism: Cultivating Ethical Practices of Freedom” in Foucault Studies, exploring the relevance of Foucault’s ideas for feminist and queer thought in the context of neoliberal governmentality, drawing on the work of Eve Kosofsky Sedgwick to rethink ethical practices beyond identity politics.

Sawicki has also contributed chapters such as “Queering Foucault and the Subject of Feminism” (2006) and “Foucault, Feminism and Questions of Identity” (1994) in The Cambridge Companion to Foucault, examining how Foucault’s work informs feminist and queer understandings of subjectivity. Her essays “Foucault and the Discourse of Desire” (2010) and “Foucault’s Pleasures: Desexualizing Queer Politics” (2004) investigate the intersections of desire, pleasure, power, and ethics, while “Foucault and Sexual Freedom: Why Embrace an Ethics of Pleasure?” further explores Foucault’s conception of ethical self‑formation. Additionally, Sawicki’s contributions such as “Disciplining Mothers: Feminism and the New Reproductive Technologies” and “Feminism, Foucault, and ‘Subjects’ of Power and Freedom” (1996) highlight her engagement with reproductive ethics and feminist interpretations of power, demonstrating her ongoing influence in the application of Foucauldian analysis to contemporary feminist theory.

== Philosophy ==
Sawicki's scholarship has focused particularly on the relationship between Foucault's philosophy and feminist thought. Her work considers questions of power, subjectivity, identity, freedom, sexuality, and political resistance. Rather than treating power solely as something possessed by institutions or individuals, her interpretation of Foucault examines the ways power operates through social practices and forms of subject formation.

Her 1986 article, "Foucault and Feminism: Toward a Politics of Difference," addressed the problem of difference within feminist theory. The essay examined whether Foucault's analysis of power could contribute to feminist political theory while avoiding assumptions about a unified category of "women."

Sawicki subsequently developed these themes in her book Disciplining Foucault: Feminism, Power, and the Body, published by Routledge in 1991. The book examines Foucault's accounts of power, discipline, sexuality, and the body in relation to feminist theory. It also considers the possibilities and limitations of using Foucauldian concepts in feminist analysis. Her work has challenged interpretations of Foucault that treat his conception of power as leaving little room for resistance or political action. Sawicki has instead examined how practices of freedom and forms of ethical self-formation can emerge within relations of power.

=== Feminism and Foucault ===
A major theme of Sawicki's scholarship is the possibility of bringing Foucauldian philosophy and feminist theory into dialogue. Her work addresses tensions between Foucault's rejection of universal political subjects and feminist approaches that have sometimes relied on shared categories of identity.

In "Foucault, Feminism and Questions of Identity," published in The Cambridge Companion to Foucault, Sawicki examined the implications of Foucault's analysis of identity for feminist theory. She has argued that feminist politics can recognize differences among women without abandoning collective political action.

Her writings have also addressed feminist interpretations of power and freedom. "Feminism, Foucault, and 'Subjects' of Power and Freedom," published in Feminist Interpretations of Michel Foucault in 1996, further developed her analysis of the relationship between subjectivity, power, and political agency.

Sawicki has also applied Foucauldian analysis to reproductive technologies and motherhood. Her work on "Disciplining Mothers" examined the ways reproductive technologies and associated forms of medical and social knowledge can participate in the regulation of women's bodies and identities.

=== Queer theory and sexuality ===
Sawicki's later work extended her analysis of Foucault into queer theory and the philosophy of sexuality. She has examined Foucault's treatment of desire, pleasure, sexuality, and ethical self-formation and their implications for contemporary feminist and queer politics.

Her chapter "Queering Foucault and the Subject of Feminism," published in the revised edition of The Cambridge Companion to Foucault in 2005, considered the relationship between Foucault's account of subjectivity and feminist approaches to identity.

In "Foucault's Pleasures: Desexualizing Queer Politics," published in Feminism and the Final Foucault in 2004, she examined the political and ethical implications of Foucault's discussions of pleasure. She subsequently explored related questions in "Foucault and Sexual Freedom: Why Embrace an Ethics of Pleasure?" and in her 2013 article "Queer Feminism: Cultivating Ethical Practices of Freedom."

In her work on queer feminism, Sawicki has considered whether Foucault's later writings on ethics and practices of freedom can contribute to feminist and queer approaches to political life. Her analysis has also drawn on the work of queer feminist theorist Eve Kosofsky Sedgwick.

=== Critical theory and freedom ===
Sawicki's broader philosophical interests include the nature and function of critique, political agency, freedom, identity, and the relationship between individuals and social institutions. Her work has increasingly addressed questions concerning how people can challenge established forms of knowledge and power without relying on a single universal theory of emancipation.

She has also engaged with debates in contemporary critical theory and the Frankfurt School. Her later research has considered the relationship between Foucault and psychoanalysis, as well as the concept of "experiments in living" and practices through which individuals and communities may develop alternative forms of life.

=== A Companion to Foucault ===
In 2013, Sawicki co-edited A Companion to Foucault with Chris Falzon and Timothy O'Leary. Published by Wiley-Blackwell, the volume brings together essays examining different aspects of Foucault's philosophy and intellectual legacy. Sawicki's involvement in the volume reflects her continuing engagement with Foucault scholarship across philosophy, political theory, feminism, and related fields.

== Bibliography ==
=== Books ===
- Disciplining Foucault: Feminism, Power, and the Body (1991) ISBN 9780415901888
- A Companion to Foucault (2013) ISBN 9781782684640

=== Selected articles ===
- Sawicki, J. (1986). Foucault and Feminism: Toward a Politics of Difference. Hypatia, 1(2), 23-36.
- Sawicki, J. (1987). Heidegger and Foucault: Escaping Technological Nihilism. Philosophy & Social Criticism, 13(2), 155-173.
- Sawicki, Jana (1988-12-01), "Feminism and the Power of Foucaldian Discourse", After Foucault, Rutgers University Press, pp. 161–178, doi:10.36019/9780813566153-009, ISBN 978-0-8135-6615-3
- Sawicki, Jana (1994), "Foucault, feminism, and questions of identity", in Gutting, Gary (ed.), The Cambridge Companion to Foucault, Cambridge Companions to Philosophy, Cambridge: Cambridge University Press, pp. 286–313, ISBN 978-1-139-00293-6
- Sawicki, Jana (2010), Falzon, Christopher (ed.), "Foucault, Queer Theory, and the Discourse of Desire", Foucault and Philosophy, Wiley-Blackwell, p. 185
- Sawicki, Jana (2014). "Comment on Johanna Oksala?s Foucault, Politics, and Violence". Philosophy Today. 58 (2): 289–295. doi:10.5840/philtoday201422121.
- Sawicki, Jana (2008). "Queering Freedom. By Shannon Winnubst". Hypatia. 24 (3): 205–210. doi:10.1111/j.1527-2001.2009.01052_2.x.
- Sawicki, Jana (2005). "Review of Michel Foucault, \emphAbnormal: Lectures at the College de France, 1974-1975". Notre Dame Philosophical Reviews. 2005 (1).
- Sawicki, J. (1994). Foucault, Feminismus und Identitätsfragen. Deutsche Zeitschrift für Philosophie, 42(4), 609-632.
- Sawicki, J. (2013). Queer Feminism: Cultivating Ethical Practices of Freedom. Foucault Studies, 74-87.
- Sawicki, J. (2017). Feminist Experiences: Foucauldian and Phenomenological Investigations, by Johanna Oksala Evanston, IL: Northwestern University Press, 2016, 189 pp. ISBN 9780810132405.
- Huffer, L., Ogden, S., Patton, P., & Sawicki, J. (2018). Foucauldian Spaces: Round Table Discussion with Lynne Huffer, Steven Ogden, Paul Patton, and Jana Sawicki.
