= Studia Neoaristotelica =

- Discipline: Philosophy
- Language: English
- Edited by: Daniel D. Novotný (editor-in-chief), Lukáš Novák

Publication details
- History: 2004–present
- Publisher: Philosophy Documentation Center and University of South Bohemia (Czech Republic)
- Frequency: Biannually

Standard abbreviations
- ISO 4: Stud. Neoaristot.

Indexing
- ISSN: 1214-8407 (print); 1804-6843 (web)
- OCLC no.: 320563061

Links
- Journal homepage; Online tables of contents; Online access

Studia Neoaristotelica - A Journal of Analytical Scholasticism is a peer-reviewed academic journal dedicated to the study of Aristotelian philosophy in the scholastic tradition. It was established in 2004 by the University of South Bohemia Faculty of Theology, Czech Republic and is now published by Philosophy Documentation Center. Its focus is on the later scholastics of the Renaissance and Baroque periods and the relation of their ideas to modern, especially analytic philosophy.

The board of editorial advisors include David Oderberg, Paul Richard Blum, David Clemenson, Rolf Darge, Petr Dvořák, Costantino Esposito, Edward Feser, James Franklin, Michael Gorman, Jorge J.E. Gracia, Daniel Heider, Rafael Hüntelmann, Gyula Klima, Sven K. Knebel, Simo Knuutila, Ulrich G. Leinsle, Pavel Materna, Uwe Meixner, Roberto Hoffmeister Pich, Edmund Runggaldier, Stanislav Sousedik, Jacob Schmutz, and others. All issues are available online from the Philosophy Documentation Center.
