= Archiv für Geschichte der Philosophie =

- Discipline: Philosophy
- Language: German, English, French, Italian
- Edited by: Karin de Boer, Anja Jauernig, Katja Vogt

Publication details
- History: 1888–present
- Publisher: Walter de Gruyter (Germany)
- Frequency: Quarterly

Standard abbreviations
- ISO 4: Arch. Gesch. Philos.

Indexing
- ISSN: 0003-9101 (print); 1613-0650 (web)

Links
- Journal homepage; Online archive; RSS [permanent dead link]

Archiv für Geschichte der Philosophie (English: Archive for the History of Philosophy) is a peer-reviewed academic journal of philosophy. It publishes in German, English, French, and Italian. It focuses on the history of philosophy and was founded in 1888.

== See also ==
- List of philosophy journals
