= Rational mysticism =

Metaphysical theory

Rational mysticism, which encompasses both rationalism and mysticism, is a term used by scholars, researchers, and other intellectuals, some of whom engage in studies of how altered states of consciousness or transcendence such as trance, visions, and prayer occur. Lines of investigation include historical and philosophical inquiry as well as scientific inquiry within such fields as neurophysiology and psychology.

== Overview ==
The term "rational mysticism" was in use at least as early as 1911 when it was the subject of an article by Henry W. Clark in the Harvard Theological Review. In a 1924 book, Rational Mysticism, theosophist William Kingsland correlated rational mysticism with scientific idealism. South African philosopher J. N. Findlay frequently used the term, developing the theme in Ascent to the Absolute and other works in the 1960s and 1970s.

Columbia University pragmatist John Herman Randall, Jr. characterized both Plotinus and Baruch Spinoza as “rationalists with overtones of rational mysticism” in his 1970 book Hellenistic Ways of Deliverance and the Making of Christian Synthesis. Rice University professor of religious studies Jeffrey J. Kripal, in his 2001 book Roads of Excess, Palaces of Wisdom, defined rational mysticism as “not a contradiction in terms” but “a mysticism whose limits are set by reason.”

In response to criticism of his book The End of Faith, author Sam Harris used the term rational mysticism for the title of his rebuttal. University of Pennsylvania neurotheologist Andrew Newberg has been using nuclear medicine brain imaging in similar research since the early 1990s.

Executive editor of Discover magazine Corey S. Powell, in his 2002 book, God in the Equation, attributed the term to Albert Einstein: “In creating his radical cosmology, Einstein stitched together a rational mysticism, drawing on—but distinct from—the views that came before.”

Science writer John Horgan interviewed and profiled James Austin, Terence McKenna, Michael Persinger, Christian Rätsch, Huston Smith, Ken Wilber, Alexander Shulgin and others for Rational Mysticism: Dispatches from the Border Between Science and Spirituality, his 2003 study of “the scientific quest to explain the transcendent.”

== See also ==
- Analytic philosophy
- Gnosis
- Henosis
- Philosophy of Baruch Spinoza
- Platonism
- Pythagoreanism
- Relationship between religion and science
- Sociology of scientific knowledge
