= Animus (journal) =

Animus is an electronic academic journal of philosophy and the humanities based at the Grenfell Campus, Memorial University of Newfoundland. It was established in 1996 and appears annually. The current editors are Ken Jacobsen, David Peddle, Neil Robertson, Kenneth Kierans, and Eli Diamond. Animus is abstracted and indexed in the Philosopher's Index.
