= Teorema (journal) =

- Discipline: Philosophy, philosophy of science
- Language: Spanish & English

Publication details
- History: 1971–1986; 1996-present
- Publisher: Universidad de Granada (Spain)
- Frequency: 2/year + 1 monographic

Standard abbreviations
- ISO 4: Teorema

Indexing
- ISSN: 1888-1254

Links
- Journal homepage

Teorema is a triannual peer-reviewed academic journal of philosophy, published in Spain.

== History ==
It was established in 1971 by Manuel Garrido (*1925-†(2015) and published without interruption until 1986. Teorema also organised a significant number of conferences and symposia, on a wide variety of topics. In December 1996, Teorema resumed publication. The current editor-in-chief is Luis M. Valdés-Villanueva (University of Oviedo).

== Scope ==
Teorema publishes original articles in Spanish or in English in the following areas: logic, philosophy of language, philosophical logic, philosophy of mind, philosophy and history of science, epistemology, and related areas. The journal also regularly publishes special issues on specific themes and includes a supplement, limbo, a bulletin covering studies on the Anglo-Spanish philosopher Jorge Santayana.

== Abstracting and indexing ==
The journal is abstracted and indexed in the Arts and Humanities Citation Index, Latindex, Répertoire bibliografique de la philosophie, and The Philosopher's Index. The contents of teorema are also available at JSTOR.
