= Apeiron (journal) =

Apeiron: A Journal for Ancient Philosophy and Science
- Discipline: Philosophy, history of science, history of medicine
- Language: English, French, German
- Edited by: Mariska Leunissen, Christian Wildberg

Publication details
- History: 1966-present
- Publisher: Walter de Gruyter
- Frequency: Quarterly

Standard abbreviations
- ISO 4: Apeiron

Indexing
- ISSN: 0003-6390
- LCCN: cn88030374
- OCLC no.: 166882481

Links
- Journal homepage

Apeiron: A Journal for Ancient Philosophy and Science is a peer-reviewed academic journal on ancient philosophy. It covers research in the area of ancient Greek and Roman philosophy and science, up to the end of the classical period (roughly the seventh century CE).

== See also ==
- List of philosophy journals
