= Linguistic and Philosophical Investigations =

- Discipline: Philosophy
- Language: English

Standard abbreviations
- ISO 4: Linguist. Philos. Investig.

Indexing
- ISSN: 1841-2394
- OCLC no.: 505834669

Linguistic and Philosophical Investigations is a philosophy journal that publishes articles addressing the foundations of language. Retraction Watch has referred to it as a "fake journal", alleging that many of its publications are AI-generated and that many of the purported authors do not exist.

== See also ==
- List of philosophy journals
