= Grazer Philosophische Studien =

- Discipline: Philosophy
- Language: English, German
- Edited by: Johannes Brandl, Marian David, Maria Reicher, Leopold Stubenberg

Publication details
- History: 1975–present
- Publisher: Brill Publishers/Rodopi Publishers
- Frequency: Irregular

Standard abbreviations
- ISO 4: Grazer Philos. Stud.

Indexing
- ISSN: 0165-9227
- LCCN: 85640361
- OCLC no.: 643613117

Links
- Journal homepage; Online access

Grazer Philosophische Studien/International Journal for Analytic Philosophy is a peer-reviewed academic journal on philosophy published by Rodopi Publishers. It was established in 1975 by Rudolf Haller and is currently edited by Johannes L. Brandl (University of Salzburg), Marian David (University of Graz), Maria E. Reicher-Marek (University of Aachen), and Leopold Stubenberg (University of Notre Dame). At least two volumes of the journal appear each year, including special issues on selected topics. The journal covers all aspects of philosophy, especially analytical philosophy. Contributions are in English or German.

== See also ==
- List of philosophy journals
