= Humana.Mente =

- Discipline: Philosophy
- Language: English, French, German, Italian
- Edited by: Silvano Zipoli Caiani

Publication details
- History: 2007–present
- Publisher: Edizioni ETS
- Frequency: Quarterly
- Open access: Yes

Standard abbreviations
- ISO 4: Humana.Mente

Indexing
- ISSN: 1972-1293

Links
- Journal homepage; Online archive

Humana.Mente – Journal of Philosophical Studies is a quarterly peer-reviewed academic journal of philosophy. Each issue focuses on a specific theme, selected from among critical topics in the contemporary philosophical debate, and is edited by a specialist on the subject, usually an emerging researcher with both philosophical and scientific competence. The editor-in-chief is Silvano Zipoli Caiani (University of Florence), the executive editors are Marco Fenici; Federico Boem, and Matteo Galletti. At present, the journal publishes papers in English.

== Indexing ==
Humana.Mente is indexed in:SCOPUS (Elsevier citation database of peer-reviewed literature); WEB OF SCIENCE (Emerging Sources Citation Index);DOAJ (Directory of Open Access Journals);PhilPapers (Online Research in Philosophy). In 2022, according to Scimago Journal and Country Rank, Humana.Mente is ranked within the second quartile of international philosophical journal.

== Sections ==
Humana.Mente is organized in four sections: Papers, Book Reviews, Commentaries, and Interviews. The Papers section intends to create a wide and stimulating reflection on the topics of the issue. Reviews focus on the latest books (dating back not more than 2 years prior to the publication of the issue) that relate to the issue topics. By contrast, the Commentaries section wants to re-open the debate on more “classical” books that deal with the issue topics, and possibly suggest a new perspective to interpret them. Interviews are open dialogs with notable scholars.
