= Niels Jørgen Cappelørn =

Niels Jørgen Cappelørn (born 11 February 1945) is a Danish theologian, Søren Kierkegaard scholar and former director of Søren Kierkegaard Research Center at the University of Copenhagen. He has written and edited a number of books on Kierkegaard, and was editor of Index til Søren Kierkegaards Papirer, bind XIV-XVI (1975–78). He was Director of the Danish Bible Society from 1980 to 1993.

Professor Cappelørn is a member of the Danish Council of Ethics, a body which provides advice to the Danish Parliament and raises public debate about ethical problems in the field of biomedicine, and a member of the Norwegian Academy of Science and Letters. He was made a Knight of the Order of the Dannebrog in 1992. A festschrift in his honor, At Være Sig Selv Nærværende (To Be Present to Oneself) was published in 2010, on the occasion of Professor Cappelørn's 65th birthday.
