= Crousetown, Nova Scotia =

Community in Nova Scotia, Canada

Coordinates: 44°14′55″N 64°28′38.9″W

Crousetown in Nova Scotia

Crousetown is a community in the Canadian province of Nova Scotia, located in the Lunenburg Municipal District in Lunenburg County.

Robert Crouse, the philosopher and priest, was a resident of Crousetown.
