= Waiguo Zhexue =

- Discipline: Philosophy
- Language: Chinese
- Edited by: Peking University

Publication details
- History: 1981–present
- Publisher: Commercial Press for the Department of Philosophy at Peking University (China)
- Frequency: Semiannually

Standard abbreviations
- ISO 4: Waiguo Zhexue

Indexing
- ISSN: 1007-6719
- OCLC no.: 695454845

Links
- Journal homepage

Waiguo Zhexue (Chinese: 外国哲学, lit. Foreign Philosophy) is a peer-reviewed Chinese-language academic journal covering the study of non-Chinese philosophies. It was established in 1981 and is published semiannually by the Institute of Foreign Philosophy at Peking University and the Commercial Press. The journal's primary objective is to introduce, analyze, and critique philosophical ideas and movements from around the world, for a comprehensive understanding of global philosophical discourse within the Chinese academic community.

Waiguo Zhexue
- Simplified Chinese: 外国哲学
- Traditional Chinese: 外國哲學
Transcriptions
Standard Mandarin
- Hanyu Pinyin: Wàiguó Zhéxué

== History ==
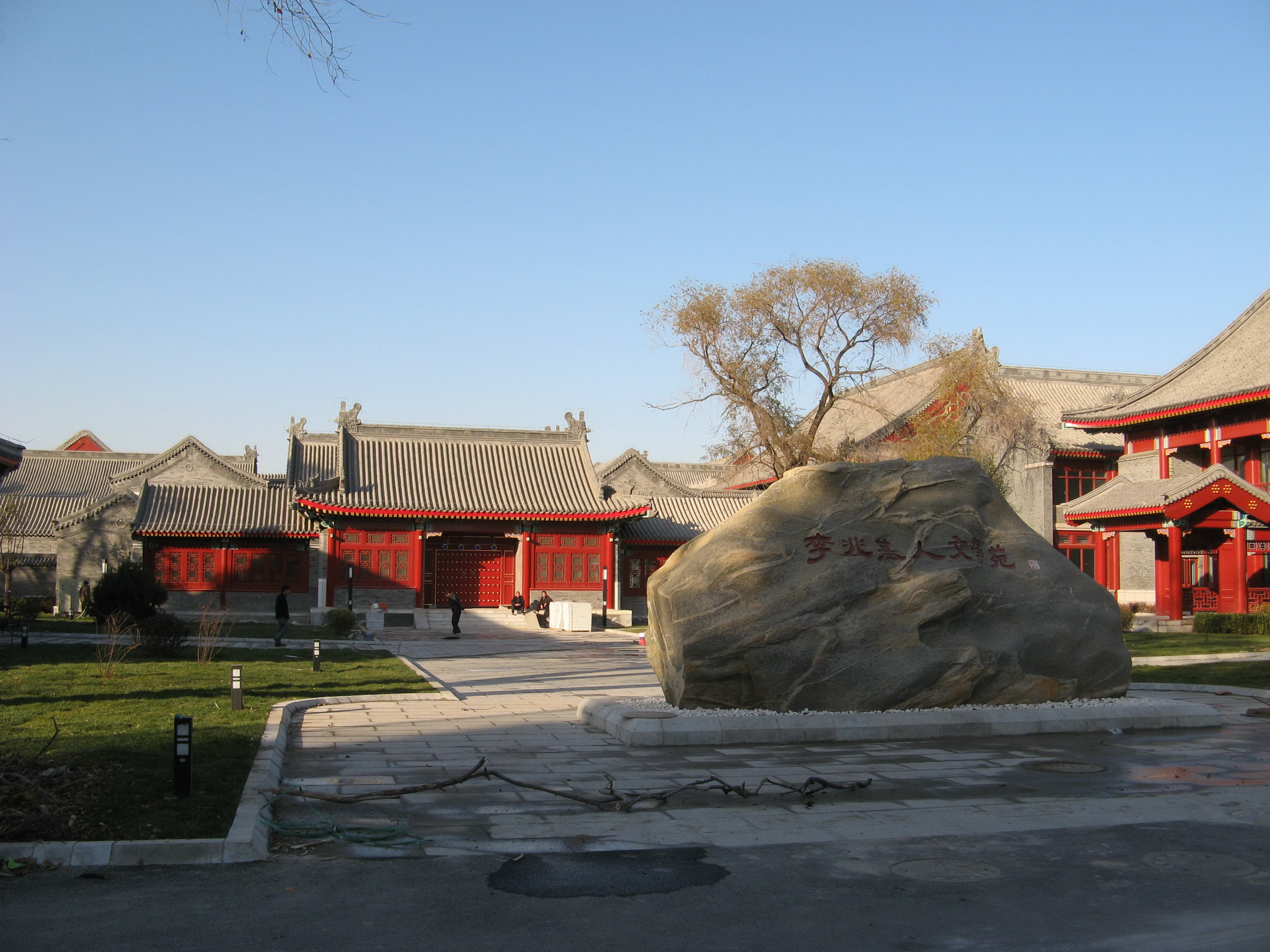
Institute of Foreign Philosophy, Peking University

The 1980s marked a period of significant intellectual openness in China, with scholars increasingly engaging with Western philosophical traditions. In response to this growing interest, the Institute of Foreign Philosophy at Peking University established the journal in 1981, as a platform to bridge Chinese scholars with international philosophical developments, facilitating cross-cultural academic exchange.

== Abstracting and indexing ==
The journal is abstracted and indexed in CNKI, CSSCI, AMI, National Social Sciences Database, Wanfang Data.

== See also ==
- List of philosophy journals
