= Filosofický časopis =

- Discipline: Philosophy
- Language: Czech
- Edited by: Ladislav Kvasz

Publication details
- History: 1953–present
- Publisher: Academy of Sciences of the Czech Republic (Czech Republic)
- Frequency: Bimonthly

Standard abbreviations
- ISO 4: Filos. čas.

Indexing
- ISSN: 0015-1831
- OCLC no.: 8303633

Links
- Journal homepage

Filosofický časopis is a peer-reviewed academic journal on philosophy. The journal was established in 1953 by the Czechoslovak Academy of Sciences. Nowadays Filosofický časopis is published by the Institute for philosophy of the Academy of Sciences of the Czech Republic.

Filosofický časopis is the oldest philosophical journal among those which are now published in the Czech Republic. It covers all philosophical traditions and all the areas of philosophy. It is indexed in the Web of Science, Scopus, DOAJ, ERIH and ISI databases. The editor-in-chief is Ladislav Kvasz.

== See also ==
- List of philosophy journals
