= Bruce Aune =

American philosopher (born 1933)

- Born: November 7, 1933 (age 92)

Education
- Education: UCLA, University of Minnesota

Philosophical work
- Era: 21st-century philosophy
- Region: Western philosophy
- Institutions: University of Massachusetts Amherst, University of Pittsburgh, Oberlin College
- Main interests: epistemology, metaphysics, philosophy of language, history of ethics

Bruce Aune (born November 7, 1933) is an American philosopher who is Professor Emeritus of Philosophy at the University of Massachusetts Amherst. He is known for his works on epistemology, metaphysics and history of ethics.

== Books ==
- Knowledge, Mind, and Nature (1967)
- Rationalism, Empiricism, and Pragmatism (1970)
- Reason and Action (1977)
- Kant's Theory of Morals (1980)
- Metaphysics: The Elements (1985)
- Knowledge of the External World (1991)
- An Empiricist Theory of Knowledge (2009)
- My Philosophic Life: A Memoir (2015)
