= Revista Española de Filosofía Medieval =

Revista Española de Filosofía Medieval ("Spanish Journal of Medieval Philosophy - REFIME") is a scholarly journal publishing studies and research on medieval philosophy and science. Revista is printed and distributed by UCOPress at the University of Cordoba, Spain. The Journal is sponsored by Sociedad de Filosofía Medieval and it has been published since 1993.

The current editors of Revista Española de Filosofía Medieval are Alexander Fidora Riera (ICREA – Autonomous University of Barcelona), Natalia Jakubecki (CONICET - Universidad de Buenos Aires). The editorial team also includes María Cabré Duran (University of Girona) as journal's executive editor, Luca Burzelli (Universitat Pompeu Fabra, Barcelona) as assistant editor, María Trinidad Alcalá Díaz (Universidad de Córdoba) as section editor, and Mário João Correia (Universidade do Porto) as book review editor.
