= Foucault Studies =

- Discipline: philosophy
- Language: English
- Edited by: Sverre Raffnsøe

Publication details
- History: 2004–present
- Publisher: Copenhagen Business School (Denmark)
- Frequency: Annual

Standard abbreviations
- ISO 4: Foucault Stud.

Indexing
- ISSN: 1832-5203

Links
- Journal homepage; Online access

Foucault Studies is a peer-reviewed academic journal dedicated to scholarly work on the thought of Michel Foucault. It was established in 2004 and is edited by Robert Bernasconi at Copenhagen Business School.

== See also ==
- List of philosophy journals
