= International Journal of Philosophical Studies =

Peer-reviewed academic journal on philosophy

- Discipline: Philosophy
- Language: English

Publication details
- History: 1993–present
- Publisher: Routledge
- Frequency: 5/year

Standard abbreviations
- ISO 4: Int. J. Philos. Stud.

Indexing
- ISSN: 0967-2559 (print); 1466-4542 (web)
- OCLC no.: 27997870

Links
- Journal homepage; Online access; Online archive

International Journal of Philosophical Studies is a peer-reviewed academic journal of philosophy publishing original work from both analytic and continental traditions.

== See also ==
- List of philosophy journals
