= Avant (journal) =

- Discipline: interdisciplinary studies, philosophy
- Language: English, Polish
- Edited by: Witold Wachowski

Publication details
- History: 2010–present
- Publisher: Centre for Philosophical Research in Warsaw (Poland)
- Frequency: Triannually
- Open access: yes

Standard abbreviations
- ISO 4: Avant

Indexing
- ISSN: 2082-7598 (print); 2082-6710 (web)

Links
- Journal homepage

Avant. The Journal of the Philosophical-Interdisciplinary Vanguard (Trends in interdisciplinary studies and philosophy of science) is a triannual peer-reviewed open access academic journal. It is published by the Centre of Philosophical Research in Warsaw and cooperates with the faculty and PhD students at the NCU. The editor-in-chief is Witold Wachowski.

The journal is bilingual (English and Polish), published both online and in print.

The Avant journal is interested in current trends in interdisciplinary studies and philosophy of science. The journal publishes reviews and review papers, polemical texts, comments, opinions, academic essays and interviews; it focuses on new approaches in cognitive science, phenomenology, psychology, sociology, anthropology, studies on art, social ontology, constructivism, robotics, sciences of complexity and others.
