= Quodlibet (journal) =

Philosophy journal

- Discipline: Philosophy
- Language: English
- Edited by: Scott David Foutz

Publication details
- History: 1999–present
- Publisher: Scott David Foutz

Standard abbreviations
- ISO 4: Quodlibet

Indexing
- ISSN: 1526-6575
- OCLC no.: 42345714

Links
- Journal homepage

Quodlibet: online journal of Christian theology and philosophy is a peer-reviewed academic journal of philosophy. It deals with issues that present a common ground between philosophy and theology. The journal covers all areas of theology and philosophy with particular attention for Christianity, though not excluding contributions from other perspectives. For example, the September 1999 issue included an article on the impact of quantum physics on theological dialogue.

Both articles and book reviews have been published.

This online journal may no longer exist. For over a year, it had been on "hiatus," not accepting articles for publication. As of December 2019 its official link no longer works.

== See also ==
- List of philosophy journals
