= Robert Crouse =

Canadian religious philosopher (1930–2011)

- Born: October 25, 1930; Winthrop, Massachusetts, United States
- Died: January 15, 2011 (aged 80); Crousetown, Nova Scotia, Canada

Academic background
- Education: University of King's College, Harvard Divinity School, University of Toronto, Harvard University
- Thesis: Honorius Augustodunensis, De Neocosmo. A Critical Edition of the Text with Introduction and Notes. (1970)
- Doctoral advisor: George Huntston Williams

Robert Darwin Crouse (October 25, 1930 – January 15, 2011) was a Canadian religious philosopher and Anglican priest.

== Early life and education ==
Crouse received his primary and secondary education in the village school of Crousetown and at King’s Collegiate School in Windsor. He arrived at Dalhousie University and King’s College in 1947, the year James Doull began teaching in the Classics Department. He graduated in Classics in 1951 and then spent a year studying philosophy at Dalhousie and theology at King’s.

Crouse then attended Harvard to study Divinity where he added German to his Greek, Latin, and French. Through work on Dante and after years of teaching in Italy at the Ambrosianum and the Augustinianum he also acquired Italian. Harvard granted him an S.T.B. (cum laude) in 1954 and he was ordained priest by the Anglican Bishop of Nova Scotia. After Harvard, Crouse moved to Trinity College, Toronto, where he was a Tutor in Divinity for three years and earned a Master of Theology (First Class Honours) in 1957. In 1970 Crouse completed the PhD at Harvard; his dissertation was a critical edition of the De Neocosmo of Honorius Augustodunensis. Trinity awarded him an Honorary Doctor of Divinity in 1983.

== Career ==
Crouse’s full-time teaching career began with an appointment as Assistant Professor of Church History and Patristics at Bishop's University, in the Province of Quebec. When he returned to Nova Scotia in 1963 to join the Classics Department of Dalhousie, several of his former students at Bishop’s followed him; one of them, the Augustinian scholar Dr. Colin Starnes, became Professor of Classics and President of the University of King's College.

At Dalhousie, together with James Doull, Crouse played an essential role in creating a distinctive way of presenting Classics. The scholarly sciences were used, not to enforce historicism, but to break down the barriers between past, present, and future. They also emphasized a vision of the Classics that included Hellenism’s relation to Middle Eastern cultures.

Crouse published more than seventy articles, reviews, and translations. In 1972 he joined other members of the Department of Classics, as well as members of the Departments of German and Sociology, at Dalhousie University, as the first coordinators responsible for the structure and lectures of the Foundation Year Programme at King’s. He served as Chairman of the Department of Classics from 1971 to 1976 and was made full Professor in 1976. Together with Hilary Armstrong and Patrick Atherton, in 1977, Crouse and Doull founded Dionysius. At King’s he was a Carnegie Professor from 1979 and Clerk of Convocation between 1972 and 1994, responsible both for the choice of honorary degree candidates and the conduct of the Encaenia ceremonies; he served as Vice-President for two years and Director of the Foundation Year Programme for one. In 1981 Crouse helped establish St Peter Publications in Charlottetown and the Atlantic Theological Conferences.

He retired as Emeritus Professor in 1996. In 1990 the Institutum Patristicum Augustinianum in Rome named him Visiting Professor of Patrology, a post he took up repeatedly until 2004; he was the first non-Roman Catholic to be given this distinction. King’s awarded him an Honorary Doctor of Divinity in 2007.

Crouse was described by Roman Catholic writers as a scholar of "extraordinary learning and deep attention to the original texts from antiquity to the present day," and a "prime mover" of the Anglo-Catholic tradition. Anglican reviewers have cited his "extraordinary spiritual depth" and "profound spiritual reflection."
