= Filosofia, ara! =

Catalan academic Journal of philosophy

- Type: Magazine
- Founded: December 2015
- Language: Catalan
- ISSN: 2462-3865
- Website: filoara.cat

Filosofia, ara! is a Catalan academic Journal of philosophy

== Description ==
Filosofia, ara! was founded in December 2015 in Catalonia. The Magazine is coordinated by Xavier Serra Besalú and Anna Sarsanedas Darnés, and draws inspiration from the publications Philosophie Magazine and Philosophy Now. It is published twice a year, and it aims primarily at high-school, university and post-university students, teachers, and other people interested in philosophy. The first issue was dedicated to the philosophers included in the syllabus of the History of Philosophy Exam of the Catalan University Entrance Exam in 2015 (Plato, René Descartes, John Locke, John Stuart Mill and Friedrich Nietzsche).

Each issue of the magazine includes a number of articles dedicated to a specific topic. It also includes other sections with general articles, reviews, documentation, translations, accounts of successful educational experiences, an area devoted to young authors (the student's balcony), and a back cover that illustrates the vitality of philosophy in Catalonia.
