= Conatus (journal) =

Journal of philosophy

Conatus - Journal of Philosophy
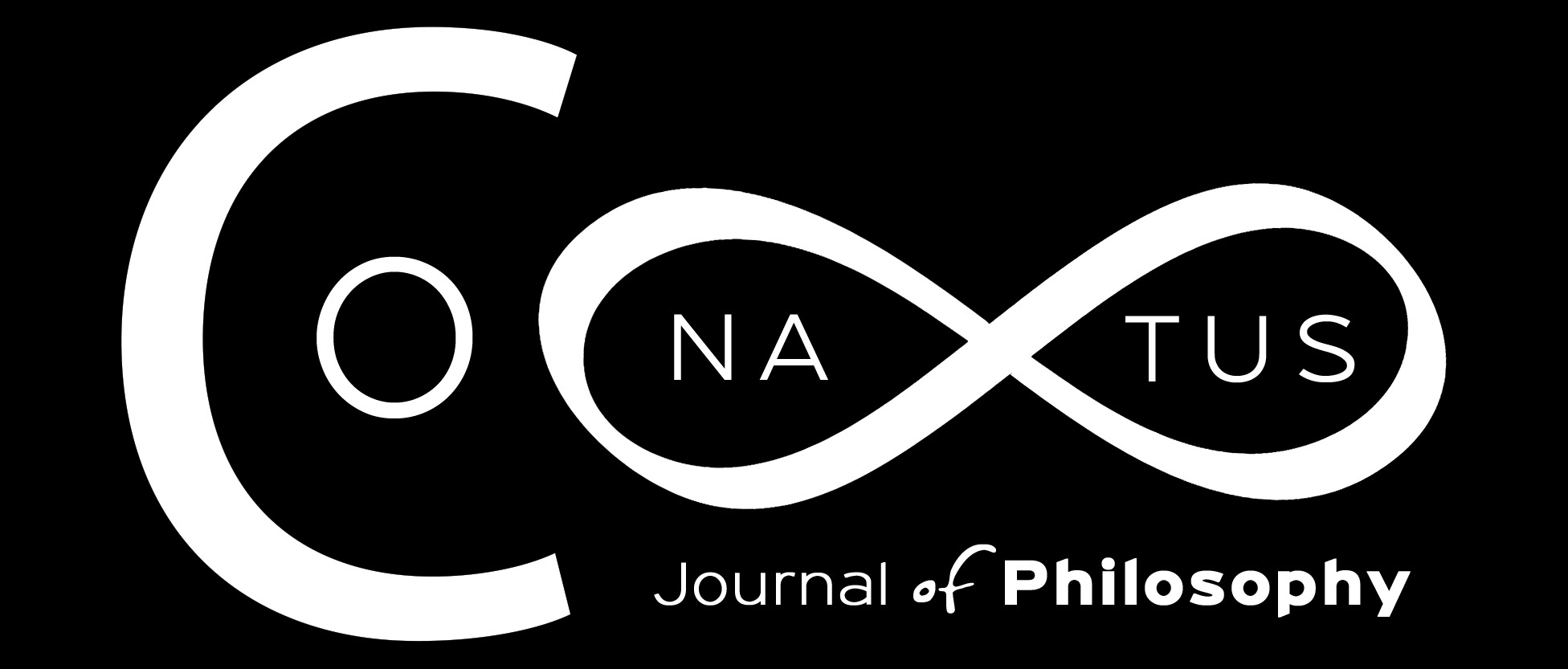
- Discipline: Philosophy
- Language: English
- Edited by: Evangelos D. Protopapadakis

Publication details
- History: 2016–present
- Publisher: Applied Philosophy Research Laboratory (NKUA) (Greece)
- Frequency: Biannual
- Open access: Yes
- License: CC BY NC

Standard abbreviations
- ISO 4: Conatus

Indexing
- ISSN: 2653-9373 (print); 2459-3842 (web)
- OCLC no.: 1314033045

Links
- Journal homepage; Online archive

Conatus: Journal of Philosophy is a biannual peer-reviewed open-access academic journal of philosophy. It was established in 2016 by the Applied Philosophy Research Laboratory (Department of Philosophy, National and Kapodistrian University of Athens) in collaboration with the Greek National Documentation Centre. It publishes original philosophical articles on theoretical and applied issues. The founder and current editor-in-chief is Evangelos D. Protopapadakis (National and Kapodistrian University of Athens).

== Abstracting and indexing ==
The journal is abstracted and indexed in Scopus and EBSCO databases.

== Article categories ==
The journal publishes original research articles, critical discussions, book reviews, and letters to the editor.
