= Dionysius (journal) =

Dionysius is a scholarly journal published by the Department of Classics at Dalhousie University. It was established originally in 1977, and a new series began in 1998. It publishes articles on the history of ancient philosophy and theology, and has a special interest in the Aristotelian and Neoplatonic traditions. It also publishes more general articles relating to literature, history, and religion.

The original editors-in-chief were J.A. Doull, R.D. Crouse, and A. H. Armstrong, whose Form, Individual, and Person in Plotinus appeared in the first volume.

Many of the original editorial advisors made contributions to the journal. Examples include Werner Beierwaltes' Negati Affirmatio or The World as Metaphor: A Foundation for Medieval Aesthetics from the Writings of John Scotus Eriugena and his Cusanus and Eriugena; Mary T. Clark's Augustine's Theology of the Trinity: Its Relevance; J.N. Findlay's The Myths of Plato; Hans-Georg Gadamer's Plato's "Parmenides" and Its Influence; and George Grant's Nietzsche and the Ancients: Philosophy and Scholarship.
