= Peter Lang (publisher) =

Swiss academic publisher

- Founded: 1970, Frankfurt am Main, Germany
- Founder: Peter Lang
- Country of origin: Switzerland
- Headquarters location: Lausanne
- Distribution: self distributed (Switzerland); Libri (Germany); Gardners (UK); Baker & Taylor, GOBI Library Solutions, Ingram Content Group (US); University of Toronto Press; China Publishers Services (Hong Kong); Co Info (Australia)
- Publication types: Books, academic journals, textbooks
- Official website: peterlang.com

Peter Lang is an academic publisher specializing in the humanities and social sciences. It has its headquarters in Lausanne, Switzerland, with offices in Berlin, Brussels, Chennai, New York, and Oxford.

Peter Lang publishes over 1,100 academic titles annually, both in print and digital formats, with a backlist of over 40,000 books. It has its complete online journals collection available on Ingentaconnect, and distributes its digital textbooks globally through Kortext.

== Areas of publication ==
The company specializes in the following twelve subject areas:

- Economics and Management
- Education
- English Language and Literatures
- German Language and Literatures
- History
- Law
- Linguistics
- Media and Communication
- Philosophy
- Politics
- Romance Languages and Literatures
- Theology

== History ==
The company was founded in Frankfurt am Main in 1970 by Swiss editor Peter Lang. Since 1982 it has had an American subsidiary, Peter Lang Publishing USA, specializing in textbooks for classroom use in education, media and communication, and Black studies, as well as monographs in the humanities and social sciences.

Peter Lang was acquired in 2015 through a management buyout led by Chairman Claude Béglé.

== Academic journals ==
Peter Lang has published 22 academic journals:

- Cognitive Semiotics
- Compar(a)ison
- Cultura
- Faits de Langues
- Informationes Theologiae Europae
- International Journal of Musicology, New Series
- Jahrbuch für Internationale Germanistik
- Jahrbuch für Pädagogik
- Journal of International Mobility
- Journal of Public Pedagogy
- Literatur für Leser
- Mediaevistik
- Neue Politische Literatur
- Pädagogische Rundschau
- Philology
- Philosophy and Theory in Higher Education
- SPIEL, Neue Folge
- Variations
- Zeitschrift für Angewandte Linguistik
- Zeitschrift für Germanistik Online DB
- Zeitschrift für Weltgeschichte
- Zeitschrift für Wortbildung/Journal of Word Formation

=== Former journals published by Peter Lang ===
- Asiatische Studien/Études Asiatiques (published by De Gruyter Brill)
