= International Directory of Philosophy =

Online philosophy database

- Producer: Philosophy Documentation Center
- History: 2010–present
- Languages: English

Access
- Providers: Philosophy Documentation Center
- Cost: Subscription with limited preview

Coverage
- Disciplines: Philosophy
- Record depth: Index
- Format coverage: online
- Temporal coverage: 2008-current
- Geospatial coverage: Worldwide
- No. of records: 31,000+ philosophers, 2,900 philosophy departments, 1,200 journals, 420 membership organizations, 350 research centers, 700 publishers

Links
- Website: www.pdcnet.org/idphil

The International Directory of Philosophy is an online database containing information on university philosophy departments, research centers, professional societies, journals, and philosophy publishers in approximately 130 countries. It was established by the Philosophy Documentation Center in 2010 through the consolidation of the Directory of American Philosophers and International Directory of Philosophy and Philosophers. This database is notable as an extensive collection of edited information about continuing philosophical activity world wide. It contains over 37,000 listings.

== History ==
The Directory of American Philosophers was established in 1963 by Prof. Archie Bahm at the University of New Mexico as a guide to on-going philosophical activity in the US and Canada. It contains edited listings for university and college philosophy programs, research centers, professional societies, philosophical journals, and publishers. It has been published by the Philosophy Documentation Center since 1972 and is now in its 29th edition (2018–2019).

The International Directory of Philosophy and Philosophers was established in 1965 under the auspices of the International Institute of Philosophy with the aid of UNESCO. The founding editors were Gilbert Varet (Centre de Documentation Philosophique – Université de Besançon), and Paul Kurtz (State University of New York at Buffalo). The first edition was also known as the Repertoire international de la philosophie et des philosophes. It has been published by the Philosophy Documentation Center since 1972 and is now in its 21st edition (2019–2020).

The data collection and editorial procedures established for publication of these print directories were adapted by Philosophy Documentation Center to support the production of the online International Directory of Philosophy.

== See also ==
- List of academic databases and search engines
