= Søren Kierkegaard Research Center =

Research institute at the University of Copenhagen, Denmark

Coordinates: 55.6756°N 12.5718°E

Søren Kierkegaard Research Center (Danish: Søren Kierkegaard Forskningscentret) at the University of Copenhagen in Denmark is an independent foundation headed by Dr. Niels Jørgen Cappelørn, and is dedicated to the research and promotion of 19th-century philosopher, Søren Kierkegaard.

The purpose of Søren Kierkegaard Research Center is:

- to carry out and promote Kierkegaard research from literary, theological and philosophical perspectives at both the national and international level
- to establish a new complete edition of all of Kierkegaard’s writings: the works he himself had published, as well as the ones he left unfinished.

Søren Kierkegaard’s Writings will be completed by 2009 containing 55 volumes. It is to be translated into English, German, French, Spanish, and Chinese.
