= International Philosophical Bibliography =

- Producer: UCLouvain
- History: 1934–present
- Languages: English, French

Access
- Providers: Peeters Publishers
- Cost: Subscription

Coverage
- Disciplines: Philosophy
- Record depth: Index and keywords
- Geospatial coverage: Worldwide
- No. of records: > 1 million

Links
- Website: pob.peeters-leuven.be/content.php

The International Philosophical Bibliography (IPB), also known in French as Répertoire bibliographique de la philosophie (RBP), is a bibliographic database covering publications on the history of philosophy and continental philosophy.

The database comprises records of publications in over 30 languages. Annually, about 12,000 records are added. The indexes include, among other elements, over 84,000 names of authors, editors, translators, reviewers, and collaborators, as well as more than 3,000 commentaries on philosophical works, making it the world's most complete index in Philosophy.

Since 1934, the IPB has been developed by the Higher Institute of Philosophy at the University of Louvain (UCLouvain), first in Leuven and since 1978 in Louvain-la-Neuve. The online version was launched by Peeters Publishers in 1997 and continues to be updated quarterly.

== See also ==
- List of academic databases and search engines
