= International Bibliography of the Social Sciences =

Bibliographic database

- Producer: ProQuest (United States)
- History: 1951 to present

Access
- Cost: Subscription

Coverage
- Disciplines: Social sciences
- Format coverage: Journal articles
- Temporal coverage: 1951 to present
- Geospatial coverage: Worldwide
- Update frequency: Weekly

The International Bibliography of the Social Sciences (IBSS) is a bibliography for social science and interdisciplinary research. The database focuses on the social science disciplines of anthropology, economics, politics and sociology, and related interdisciplinary subjects, such as development studies, human geography and environment and gender studies. It was established in 1951 and prepared by the Fondation Nationale des Sciences Politiques in Paris. Production was transferred to the London School of Economics in 1989, and then to ProQuest in 2010.
