= Peeters Publishers =

Belgian academic publisher

- Founded: 1857
- Country of origin: Belgium
- Headquarters location: Leuven
- Distribution: ISD (US); VRIN (France); John Garratt Publishing (Australia)
- Publication types: Books, journals, and databases
- Official website: www.peeters-leuven.be

Peeters Publishers is an international academic publisher founded in Leuven in 1857, joining a tradition of book printing in Leuven dating back to the 15th century. Peeters publishes 200 new titles and 75 journals a year. Humanities and social sciences are the main fields of the publishing house, with series focusing on Biblical studies, Religious studies, Patristics, Classical and Oriental studies, Egyptology, Philosophy, Ethics, Medieval studies, and the Arts.

== History ==
In 1857 the Peeters family began its printing house and bookshop in the center of Leuven. The company grew rapidly and had more than 100 employees at the turn of the twentieth century.

The Fire of Leuven in 1914 destroyed the company. After the First World War, the family focused mainly on its bookshop. In 1960, Emmanuel Peeters took over the Imprimerie Orientaliste and brought the book printing business back to the Peeters family in Leuven.

To this day, the Peeters publishing house is still family-owned and has strongly internationalised its activities.

== See also ==
- List of Peeters' academic journals
