= FRANCIS =

French academic bibliographic database

- Producer: INIST (France)
- Languages: English, French, German, Spanish

Access
- Providers: EBSCO, ProQuest, Ovid Technologies
- Cost: Subscription

Coverage
- Disciplines: Humanities, social sciences
- Record depth: Index & abstract
- Format coverage: Journal articles (79%); Books (9%), Conference proceedings, dissertations, reports, exhibition catalogs (7%), Other (5%)
- Temporal coverage: 1972-present
- Geospatial coverage: Worldwide, with emphasis on France and Europe
- No. of records: > 2.600.000
- Update frequency: Weekly

Links
- Website: www.inist.fr?Francis-74&lang=en

FRANCIS is an academic bibliographic database maintained by INIST. FRANCIS covers the core academic literature in the humanities and social sciences with special emphasis on European literature.

INIST-CNRS is now providing free access to the FRANCIS database, along with PASCAL database content, on their website.

== See also ==
- Official website
