= PhilPapers =

Online directory of philosophy papers

- Producer: Centre for Digital Philosophy at the University of Western Ontario (Canada)
- History: 2009–present

Access
- Cost: Free

Coverage
- Disciplines: Philosophy
- Record depth: Index and abstract
- Format coverage: Journals, books, open access archives, and personal web pages
- Geospatial coverage: Worldwide

Links
- Website: philpapers.org
- Title list(s): philpapers.org/journals

PhilPapers is an interactive academic database of journal articles in philosophy. It is maintained by the Centre for Digital Philosophy at the University of Western Ontario, and as of 2022, it has "394,867 registered users, including the majority of professional philosophers and graduate students". The general editors are its founders, David Bourget and David Chalmers.

PhilPapers receives financial support from other organizations, including a substantial grant in early 2009 from the Joint Information Systems Committee in the United Kingdom. The archive is praised for its comprehensiveness and organization, and for its regular updates. In addition to archiving papers, the editors run and publish the most extensive ongoing survey of academic philosophers.

== History ==
=== Philosophy Research Index ===
Philosophy Research Index
- Producer: Philosophy Documentation Center
- History: 2011–2014 (consolidated with PhilPapers)
- Languages: English, German, French, Spanish, and other western languages

Access
- Providers: Philosophy Documentation Center
- Cost: Subscription with limited preview

Coverage
- Disciplines: Philosophy
- Record depth: Index
- Format coverage: Books. Journal, Dissertations, other documents
- Temporal coverage: 1450-current
- Geospatial coverage: international
- No. of records: 1.3 million +

Links
- Website: www.pdcnet.org/pri

The Philosophy Research Index was established as an indexing database containing bibliographic information on philosophical publications in several western languages. It contained listings for a range of philosophical publications, including books, anthologies, scholarly journals, dissertations, and other documents. The first version of the database was launched by the Philosophy Documentation Center in 2011 after a multi-year planning and development process, with technical support from Makrolog Content Management. It was established to build systematic coverage of philosophical literature in several languages in a manner that could be sustained for the long term. The database provides faceted searching, automatic translation and social networking functionality, and a visual time line for the display of search results, as well as OpenURL linking to fulltext resources. Philosophical topics covered include aesthetics, epistemology, ethics, history of philosophy, logic, metaphysics, philosophy of language, philosophy of religion, philosophy of science, political philosophy, and social philosophy.

In July 2014 PDC partnered with the PhilPapers Foundation. All data in the Philosophy Research Index was consolidated into the PhilPapers database. The Philosophy Research Index ceased be available as a separate resource once commitments to its customers was fulfilled.

== See also ==
- List of academic databases and search engines
