= Philosophy Documentation Center =

American non-profit publisher and resource center

- Company type: Publisher, service provider
- Industry: Publishing, Internet services
- Genre: Applied ethics, classics, philosophy, religious studies
- Founded: Bowling Green State University, 1966
- Headquarters: Charlottesville, Virginia, U.S.
- Key people: George Leaman (director)
- Products: Academic journals, conference proceedings, anthologies, reference work, academic databases, digital media
- Services: Membership management, content digitization, hosting
- Website: www.pdcnet.org

The Philosophy Documentation Center (PDC) is a non-profit publisher and resource center that provides access to scholarly materials in applied ethics, classics, philosophy, religious studies, and related disciplines. It publishes academic journals, conference proceedings, anthologies, and online research databases, often in cooperation with scholarly and professional associations. It also provides membership management and electronic publishing services, and hosts electronic journals, series, and other publications from several countries.

== History ==
The Philosophy Documentation Center was established in 1966 at Bowling Green State University in Ohio to manage the publication of specialized reference works in philosophy. It was founded by two members of the university philosophy department, Ramona Cormier and Richard Lineback, who recognized a need to improve access to the growing body of philosophical literature in English and other languages. Its first publication was The Philosopher’s Index, which provided bibliographic listings, indexed by subject and author, of recently published journal articles in philosophy. Work on the development of this project at PDC was supported for several years by grants to Bowling Green State University from the National Endowment for the Humanities.

PDC also took up work on other specialized publishing projects. In 1970, PDC assumed responsibility for the publication of the Directory of American Philosophers and the International Directory of Philosophy and Philosophers. In 1974, it began publishing a series of research bibliographies to provide systematic overviews of the primary and secondary work of major philosophers. That same year PDC published its first journal, Philosophy Research Archives, in cooperation with the American Philosophical Association and the Canadian Philosophical Association. This bilingual project was established in microfiche format in an effort to overcome the space limitations of traditional print journals. This concept was developed by representatives of the American Council of Learned Societies, the Humanities Research Council of Canada, PDC, and the American and Canadian philosophical associations. It was one of the earliest experiments with non-traditional formats in journal publishing and is freely available online.

In 1977, PDC published a collection of papers from the First National Workshop-Conference on Teaching Philosophy, its first publishing work in support of a new professional organization. PDC also provided publishing services to independent philosophy publications for the first time. PDC's production support for serial publications in print and electronic format has expanded significantly since that time. PDC currently produces over a hundred print and electronic publications in philosophy and neighboring disciplines, and provides online access to complete sets of journals and series in several languages.

In 1995 the editor and owner of The Philosopher's Index retired from Bowling Green State University and ended his long association with PDC. Since 1995 he has continued to publish Philosopher's Index separate from PDC with his own organization (Philosopher's Information Center). PDC continued to develop other publications and services, with a focus on the publishing and membership management needs of professional associations and scholarly societies. The scope of this work increased over time, with notable projects such as the Proceedings of the Twentieth World Congress of Philosophy and the major publications of the American Philosophical Association. Fields covered by PDC now include applied ethics, classics, philosophy, religious studies, and semiotics. It manages memberships for twenty organizations, and this work includes secure hosting, digital work flow management, authenticated access to electronic resources, and online conference registration.

In 2001 PDC relocated its operations and most of its staff to Charlottesville, Virginia as a consequence of increasing technical demands of this expanding range of services.

== Electronic resources ==
In 1979, PDC launched dial-up access to The Philosopher's Index database in cooperation with DIALOG; Philosopher's Index was made available on CD-ROM in 1990. In 1987, PDC published The Logic Works, an instructional software program for introductory logic courses, in cooperation with Rob R. Brady. A number of versions of this DOS-based program were published by PDC for 15 years. PDC also published EthicsWorks, a software package for introductory ethics courses, in cooperation with Robert Pielke. In 1996, PDC partnered with InteLex Corporation to develop POIESIS: Philosophy Online Serials. This project made the content of dozens of print journals accessible online in conjunction with print subscriptions. It also allowed for the creation of complete back issue collections of several journals on CD-ROM, including Business Ethics Quarterly, Philosophy & Theology, The Review of Metaphysics, and Teaching Philosophy.

In 2009, PDC launched its eCollection of journals and series from several countries, with online access for institutions, single individuals, and membership organizations. PDC partnered with PORTICO to ensure long term preservation of this collection and participates in the CLOCKSS digital archive. PDC's online platform is also compliant with the Project COUNTER standard for online usage statistics harvesting.

In 2010, PDC launched the International Directory of Philosophy, an online database consolidating the content of the Directory of American Philosophers and the International Directory of Philosophy and Philosophers. This database contains information on university philosophy departments and programs, professional societies, research centers, journals, and publishers in approximately 130 countries.

In 2011, PDC launched the Philosophy Research Index, a new indexing database not associated with The Philosopher's Index, the International Philosophical Bibliography, or other resource. The goal of the project was to build complete bibliographic coverage of philosophical literature in several languages and by July 2014 it contained over 1.3 million listings. At that time PDC partnered with the PhilPapers Foundation and Philosophy Research Index was incorporated into the PhilPapers database.

PDC provides single document access options for non-subscribers for all journals and series on its site, including a free preview of the first page of each document. The implementation allows each publication to choose its own access terms. Pre-publication access to forthcoming articles is provided for select titles.

PDC is a member of CrossRef and integrates digital object identifiers into all journals it publishes. PDC also participates in CrossRef's Cited-By Linking and CrossMark version control services.

== See also ==
- Academic journals published by PDC
- List of academic databases and search engines
