= Philosopher's Information Center =

Educational Organization

- Founded: 1966
- Founder: Richard H. Lineback
- Headquarters location: Bowling Green, Ohio
- Official website: www.philinfo.org

The Philosopher's Information Center is a nonprofit, educational organization. It was founded in 1967 by Richard H. Lineback, who continues to serve as president.

The center is publisher of The Philosopher's Index, a comprehensive bibliography of publications in philosophy and related disciplines that date back to 1902 and originate in 140 countries. Since its founding, the center has worked to expand the scope of the index. The center has received major funding from the National Endowment for the Humanities for retrospective, international, and book projects.
