= Business purpose =

Business concept

Business purpose refers to the wider, long-term goals of a commercial enterprise. It expresses the corporate's reason for existing, its particular commitment with respect to the surrounding world. A business purpose statement serves as an affirmative reminder of the company's core identity to employees, customers, and other stakeholders; a common ground hopefully enabling them to focus on their particular tasks while feeling what they do is part of a wider, socially valued endeavor. Alongside established normative, purpose is a fundamental component of business ethics and is closely related to corporate statements such as vision, mission, and values. A simplifying, although debatable view, contends that business purpose may exist in one of two forms: current purpose, or mission; and future purpose, or vision. The term has gained wide media attention in recent times.

== History ==
Aristotle contemplated the importance of business ethics and business purpose in his Nicomachean Ethics, where he describes the moral and intellectual traits accompanying virtuous human behavior in society. Also in his Politics, where he discerns between "productive knowledge" and the political abilities required for "good wealth" acquisition. Other classic philosophers cited for dealing with matters relevant to the purpose of business are Kierkegaard, David Hume, and Nietzsche.

Ideas on the purpose of business have evolved and undergone deep revision in the present era. Early modern discussion on business purpose doctrine took place in mid-20th century in the context of its relevance to tax-saving provisions in the US Internal Revenue Code. In 1964, American businessman Frederick Kappel published a volume containing a selection from his speeches dealing with the theme and its relation to performance. The advent of social responsibility theories in the 1960's brought about demands for businesses to widen the scope of their beneficiaries to include actors beyond the owners themselves, and for companies to share with the state the economic burden of attending social needs in the communities related to their areas of operation.

A plethora of books covering the importance of corporate purpose have been published in recent times, among them Purpose: The Starting Point of Great Companies by Nikos Mourkogiannis in 2006, Start with Why by Simon Sinek in 2009, Conscious Capitalism by John Mackey and Rajendra Sisodia in 2014, Grow the Pie by Alex Edmans in 2020, Good is the new Cool by Afdhel Aziz in 2021, and Deep Purpose by Ranjay Gulati in 2022. In their book Net Positive Paul Polman and Andrew Winston provide many examples of purpose-driven organizations, including Unilever of which Polman was CEO from 2009 to 2019. Schreuder (2022) sketches the evolution of corporate social responsibility over the last four decades from Do No Harm to Net Positive or even Max Positive and provides the case of Royal DSM as illustration.
