= OVM (disambiguation) =

OVM may refer to:

- Open Verification Methodology, a documented methodology with a supporting building-block library for the verification of semiconductor chip designs
- Option Verdun/Montréal, a municipal political party in Montreal, Quebec, Canada
- OrionVM, an Australian infrastructure as a service provider and white-label cloud platform
- Optimal Velocity Model, a car-following model
- Oracle VM, server virtualization offering from Oracle in sustaining support since July 2024, being replaced by KVM and OVirt based technologies
