= Goa Institute of Management =

Business school in Goa, India

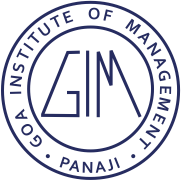
- Other name: GIM
- Motto: "Learning Never Stops at GIM"
- Type: Private business school
- Established: 1993; 33 years ago
- Founder: Romuald D'Souza
- Accreditation: AMBA, AICTE, NBA, SAQS
- Chairman: Ashank Desai
- Director: Arun Elias
- Students: 960
- Location: Sanquelim, Goa, India; 15.569°N 74.027°E
- Campus: Urban, 50 acres (0.2 km^{2})
- Website: www.gim.ac.in

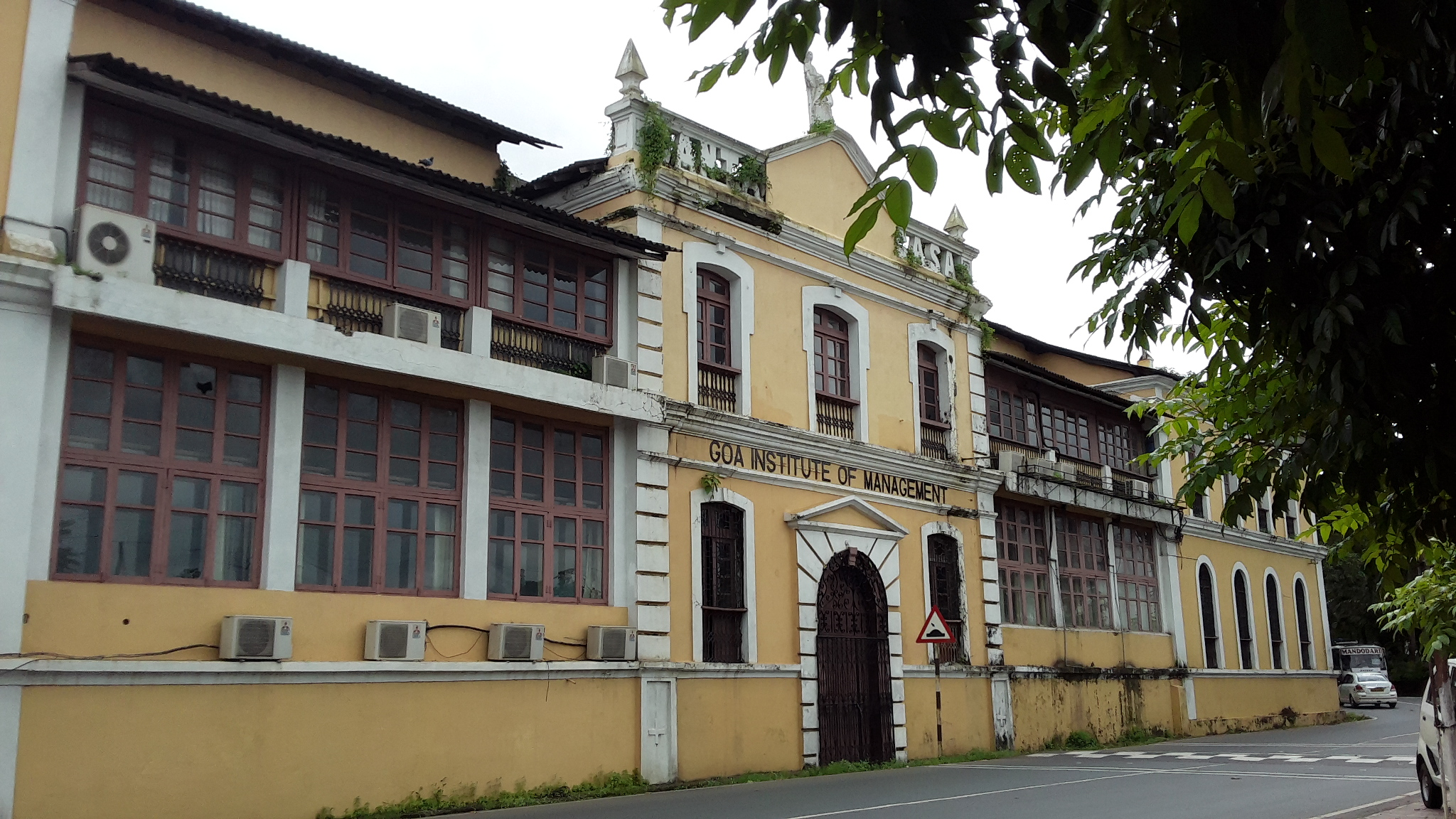
Heritage Building of Goa Institute of Management

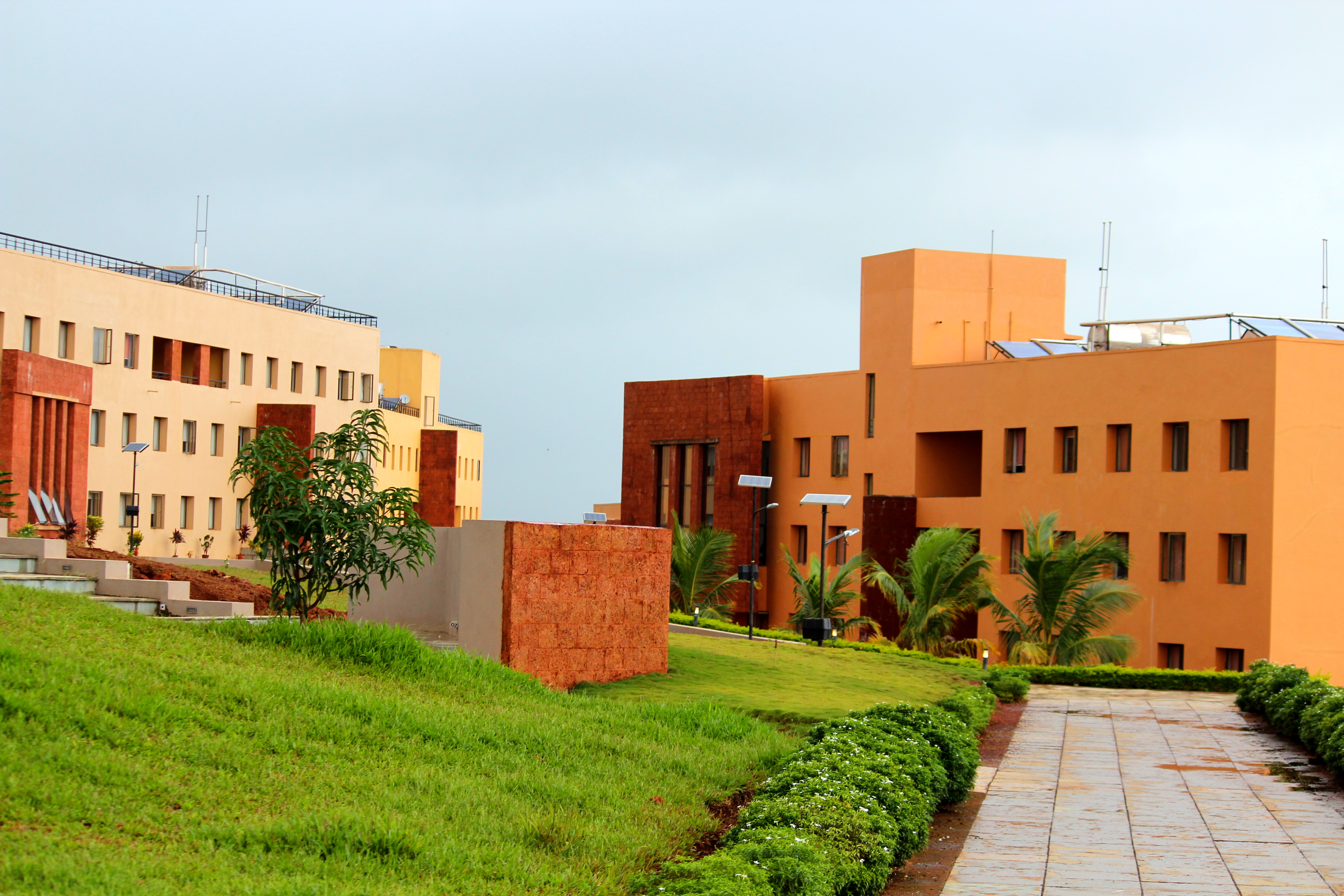
Goa Institute of Management, Sanquelim Campus.

The Goa Institute of Management (abbreviated as GIM-Goa) is an Indian autonomous business school located North Goa district in the state of Goa. GIM Goa was founded in 1993 by Romuald D'Souza, a Jesuit priest.

== History ==
Before founding GIM Goa, D'Souza earlier served as the Director of XLRI, Jamshedpur from 1982 to 1989. In 1987, he founded the Xavier Institute of Management, Bhubaneswar and was its Director till 1993.

GIM began its journey with one classroom of batch size 35 at the V. M. Salgaocar College of Law.

== Administration ==
The school is governed by a board, and offers a full-time MBA (PGDM) program (2 years), PGDM -Healthcare Management Programme (HCM-2 years), PGDM in Big Data Analytics (BDA - 2 years), PGDM in Banking, Insurance & Financial Services (BIFS- 2 years) and Part Time Executive MBA (3 years). It has a full-time "Fellow Programme in Management" (FPM) which is a doctoral programme ideal for individuals seeking academic research and teaching careers as faculty or professors. GIM also conducts Management Development Programs/Corporate trainings for various MNC's, Public & Private sector companies.

== Campus ==
=== Ribandar Campus (1993-2009) ===
Gradually, as the popularity of the programme grew with the student community, the campus was shifted to the heritage building in Ribandar Conservation Area. It was here in the same campus that the Institute really flourished while offering their flagship Postgraduate diploma in Management.

The 350-year-old campus is situated on the banks of the Mandovi River, in the Santa Casa de Misericordia in Ribandar. The building in which the school was is now a heritage conservation area under the care of Government of Goa. The class of 2011 were the last students to graduate from this campus.

=== Sanquelim Campus (2009-present) ===
In 2009, the Institute shifted to a sprawling campus in the lap of nature at Sanquelim. This 50 acre campus and is eco friendly and has a state of the art solar power generation facility to meet the energy requirements of the campus. The water treatment plant ensures retreated water is collected in a common pool and is utilized for maintenance. The pool also has its own flora and fauna with various types of fresh water fish and local birds. The new campus was inaugurated by Shri. Ashok Sekhar Ganguly, Rajya Sabha MP and former chairman of Hindustan Lever Ltd and Mla of Sanquelim Pratap Prabhakar Gauns.

=== Architecture ===
The GIM Sanquelim campus was structured in such a way so as to enable conditions for interaction, collaboration and open dialogue. The architecture is characterized by vast corridors with room for ample daylight and fresh air. Its open ambience promotes collaboration and problem solving.

The task of designing the new GIM campus was given to Ms. Somaya & Kallapa, who have also designed the new complex of IIT Bombay & Birla Institute of Technology and Science, Pilani. Civil works contract was given to Ms. Vascon Engineers & Blue Star executed most of the HVAC works.

=== Location ===
The campus is located in the quaint town of Sanquelim.in North Goa district of the Western state of Goa in India . It comes under the Poriem Panchayat Area. Some of the major tourism attractions near the campus are Harvalem Waterfalls, Chorla Ghat, Old Goa, Panaji City, Calangute beach.

=== Accommodation ===
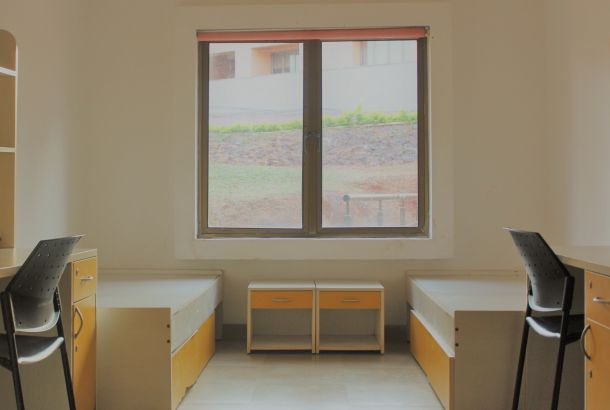
GIM Hostel Twin Sharing Room

GIM has a fully residential programme with separate hostels for Boys and Girls. Faculty accommodation is also given on the Campus.

=== Labs ===
Data Labs: Lab has SAS Suite with Open-source software like R, R Studio, Python 3.7, Hadoop, Cloudera, CDH5.x, Tableau, Power BI, Oracle VM

Finance Lab: It has access to financial research tools such as Thomson Reuters Eikon, Prowess IQ of CMIE, ProQuest

Behavioural Lab: It is equipped with Tobii Technology, which assists marketers in analysing behavioural data and patterns

=== Activities ===
- GIM organizes TEDx, Seminars, conferences around the year for students.
- There are 26 student clubs. Students choose their club depending on their Interests.
- Ribandar Talks is their famous event where many motivational speakers and famous personalities are called sharing their knowledge with students.
- Inception is their main annual function. There are many such cultural events held in GIM.
- Freshers party, Convocation, Farewell, Music festival, Educational Trips, and so on are organized by the institute
- Students get to experience the local culture through their Give Goa Initiative.

=== Facilities ===
Canteen/Cafeteria, Food Court, Convenience Store, Medical Facilities, Wi-Fi Campus, Open Auditorium, Multi-Purpose Hall, Meditation room.

=== Sports complex ===
Consists of basketball court, swimming pool, cricket ground, football ground, lawn-tennis court, volleyball court, badminton etc.

== Academics ==
Goa Institute of Management was established in 1993. It is an autonomous institute governed by a board and is accredited to AICTE & National Board of Accreditation

=== Academic programmes ===
GIM is an autonomous institute and offers PGDM (MBA), PGDM-PT and FPM. Its courses have been granted international accreditation by Association of MBAs (AMBA) & GSBN

Currently, the institute offers the following courses
Course	Intake
PGDM-Management	300
PGDM-Healthcare Management	120
PGDM-Big Data Analysis	120
PGDM-Banking Insurance & Financial Services	120

=== PGDM (MBA) ===
Post Graduate Diploma in Management is a two-year fully residential programme consisting of six terms. Students also pursue summer internship project spread over 8–10 weeks.

=== PGDM (MBA) in Healthcare Management ===
This is a 2 years full time residential course and it was introduced in 2013. The Higher Education Review has rated GIM as top 10 most promising Healthcare Management Colleges in India

=== PGDM (MBA) in Big Data Analysis ===
This course was introduced in 2018. A business analytics software & services SAS has announced its association with GIM for the Big Data Course. SAS and GIM hosted an event in which the teams analysed COVID-19 data of several countries and arrived at a conclusion that COVID-19 will not be eradicated anytime soon and we must adhere to the norms and guidelines advised by the government and health agencies.

=== PGDM (MBA) in Banking Insurance & Financial Services (BIFS) ===
This is also a 2-year fully residential course specializing in finance and related sectors. It has seen increasing affinity from the student community towards this course. The facilities for this course includes a finance lab, which is similar to a stock market trading floor so that students get practical experience in its operations. The course is good in terms of core finance knowledge skills those are imparted

=== PGDM - part time ===
It is a three-year part time MBA programme for working professionals. The last year of the programme is assigned for dissertation and work improvement project. The officiating registrar of Goa University Dr. Radhika Nayak is one of their prominent Alumni of part time programme.

=== Fellow Programme in Management ===
The programme is of four years and is aimed at training research scholars for a career in academia and practice. The program was launched in 2020 with an intake of 6 students.

=== Management development programmes ===
GIM conducts customized management trainings for executives and employees of various MNCs, Public companies, Government employees etc. It also conducts open training programmes for executives.

== Selection criteria ==
Student has to appear for any one of the exams - XAT / CAT / GMAT / CMAT Then they have to apply for admission via their website. Final selection of the student on the basis of academic performance, objective assessment, Personal Interview, composite diversity index & work experience etc. Candidates must have secured at least 50% aggregate marks (45% for SC/ST) in any degree course recognized by Association of Indian Universities / AICTE.

== Rankings ==
Institute rankings

Business/Management – India
- NIRF (2022): 36
- Outlook India (2022): 11

GIM-Goa was ranked 36 among business schools in India by the National Institutional Ranking Framework in 2022. It was ranked 11 by Outlook India's "Top Private MBA Institutions In India" of 2022.

== Awards ==
1. Ranked "Best for the World" Pioneering B-School In Positive Impact Rating
2. 2021 Flourish Prize for Global Goal #8
3. IMC Gold Award for Excellence in Management Education
4. International Green Gown Awards - Highly commended Institution of the year 2022
5. 2022 Flourish Prize for Global Goal #6

== Placements ==
Every year companies come to the campus for placements. The institute has 100% placements record every year

== International tie-ups ==
Goa Institute of Management has international tie-ups with leading educational institutions

- University of Catolica, Portugal (AACSB, Equis, EFMD accredited)
- University of Antwerp, Belgium (AACSB accredited)
- Kansas State University, USA (Higher Learning Commission (HLC) of the North Central Association of Colleges and Schools)
- Warsaw University of Technology Business School (WUTBS), Poland (EPAS accreditation)
- Lappeenranta University of Technology (LUT), Finland (EFMD accredited)
- Lisbon University Institute (ICSTE), Portugal (AACSB, AMBA)
- Sapir College, Israel (Institutional Accreditation, Ministry of Education, Israel)
- Colegio Universitario De Estudios Financieros (CUNEF), Spain
- The Institute of Higher Education in Management (HEM, Morocco; EFMD Member)
- North South University, Dhaka, Bangladesh (UGC, Bangladesh)

== International exchange programs ==
=== International Consulting Bootcamp ===
This ICB is an intensive two to four- week program. Students from the partner universities travel to India along with their professors to work on a live project. Collaborating partners are University of Antwerp & University of Dhaka.

=== The International Student Exchange Program ===
GIM's student exchange programs enable students to study abroad for one term at its partner universities of:

- Catolica Lisbon
- University of Antwerp
- LUT University
- CUNEF
- HEM

=== The Country Immersion Program ===
Currently, GIM students can travel to WUTBS, Poland for this program. WUTBS awards GIM students a completion certificate titled ‘Certificate in Business: A European Perspective’.

Warsaw University of Technology Business School

== Atal Incubation Center ==
The Atal Incubation Centre at Goa Institute of Management (AIC-GIM) was inaugurated by the honorable Chief Minister of Goa Dr. Pramod Sawant, on 26 February 2021. Atal Incubation Center at GIM has turbo charged more than 22+ Startups & conducted 35+ Startup ecosystem programs.

== Centers of excellence ==
=== Center for Social Sensitivity and Action (CSSA) ===
It is a center to promote social responsibility within and outside GIM. CSSA remains committed to the UN Sustainable Development Goals, Principles for Responsible Management Education (PRME) initiative and to the promotion of responsible management.

=== Centre For Creativity, Innovation And Design Thinking (CCIDT) ===
They organize several workshops for photography, dance, theatre, doodling, along with competitions and events throughout the year to ensure that the students' gusto is always sky high.

=== Center for Excellence in Sustainable Development (CESD) ===
Undertakes all the eco-friendly or environmental initiatives in GIM. It is also actively engaged in MSME and Government sustainability projects.

=== Center For Creativity, Innovation And Design Thinking (CCIDT) ===
The centre works at multiple levels to provide students with ample opportunities to practice design thinking skills with the use of workshops, contests based on Howard Gardner's multiple intelligences

=== Center For Entrepreneurship Development (EDC) ===
The aim of this center is to foster the spirit of entrepreneurship among students and community

=== Center for Teaching Excellence (TE@GIM) ===
Center for Teaching Excellence at GIM promotes learning-centric pedagogical practices and innovations.

=== Center for Public Policy (CPP) ===
The Center for Public Policy takes policy matters beyond the classroom and engages students in policy development projects involving public and private organizations.

== Give Goa ==
GIM inculcates in its students a sense of social responsibility through its CSR initiative ‘Give Goa’ which is a part of the course curriculum. Students work with various NGOs, understand the problems they are facing and help them with their cause.

The Give Goa initiative was started to promote social responsibility among the students of GIM through service to the less privileged communities and thereby contribute to goal of a more inclusive society. It is operationalized as a compulsory four-credit course in the first year of the PGDM program. The course has two components: a three-credit experiential project with partner organizations (such as banks and NGOs) and one-credit classroom learning experience.

== Student clubs ==
- Brain Vista - The Quiz Club
- Bitathon
- Entrepreneurship Cell (Ecell)
- GIM Agora Speakers International
- HRiday - HR Club
- i3 - Industry Institute Interaction Club
- Kshitiz - Creative and Literary Club
- MECCA - Marketing Club
- Parigyan - Data Science Society
- Prayas - Sports Club
- RaZzMaTaZz - The Cultural Club
- Samarthan
- Samriddhi
- Sankhya - The analytics club
- SCOPES - Supply Chain and Operations Club
- SOFIA - Society of Finance
- Sprokets - The Photography Club
- Student Alumni Relations Cell
- Student Public Relations Cell
- Students Advisory Council
- The Systems and Consulting Club
- Vinidhan - Student Investment Club
- Society for Public Policy
- Ribandar Talks

== Speakers ==
GIM has had eminent personalities address the students. Some of the most recent speakers have been:

- The Dalai Lama
- Shiv Khera, Author
- Anil Agarwal, founder and executive chairman, Vedanta Resources
- Prahlad Kakkar, film director
- Bjørn Lomborg, author of The Skeptical Environmentalist
- Piyush Pandey, executive chairman and national creative director Ogilvy & Mather India
- Anil D. Sahasrabudhe, Chairman- AICTE
