= Romuald D'Souza =

Indian Jesuit priest (1925–2019)

Romuald de Souza
- Born: 20 December 1925; Aldona, Portuguese Goa
- Died: 1 November 2019 (aged 93)
- Relatives: Wilfred de Souza (brother)
- Honours: Padma Shri (2010)

Romuald de Souza, SJ (20 December 1925 – 1 November 2019) was an Indian Jesuit priest. A prominent institution-builder and one-time provincial of the Jesuit province in Goa, de Souza was director of prestigious Xavier Labour Relations Institute (XLRI), at Jamshedpur, upto 1989. In 1987, he founded the Xavier Institute of Management, in Bhubaneswar, and in 1993 he established the Goa Institute of Management (GIM), then located at Ribandar on the outskirts of Panjim.

== Early life ==
Romuald de Souza was born in Aldona, Portuguese Goa. He was ordained as a priest in 1958 in Belgium. He did his master's degree in counselling from Fordham University, New York City United States. After that he studied further at Columbia University, New York City. He studied at the St. Xavier’s College, Bombay and joined the Society of Jesus (Jesuits) in Bombay in 1945. Ordained priest in 1958, he was a teacher at Loyola High School, Margao and St. Paul’s High School, Belgaum; and was later as principal at St. Vincent’s High School, Poona. In 1973 when the Jesuit Superior General, Fr Pedro Arrupe SJ appointed Romuald the Provincial of the Goa-Poona Province.

== Career ==
He returned to India in 1962 and took over as principal of St. Vincent's High School Pune in 1967. He founded the Xavier Centre of Historical Research, Porvorim, Goa in 1978. He served as the Director of XLRI, Jamshedpur from 1982 to 1989. In 1987, he founded the Xavier Institute of Management, Bhubaneswar and was its director till 1993. In 1993, he founded the Goa Institute of Management at Panaji Goa and served as its director till 2004.

He served as a Member of various academic organisations, like the Association of Management Development Institutes of South Asia, the All India Board of Management Studies, Government of India, the Executive Council of the Goa University, the Academic Council of Utkal University. He was a professional member of the Academy of Management United States, International Council of Psychologists and the American Psychological Society. He taught business ethics, management of stress, psychometrics and organisational behaviour. He also founded the now defunct Marian Institute of Healthcare Management, Goa.

== Honours ==
On 26 January 2010, the Government of India, awarded de Souza the Padma Shri, India's fourth highest civilian award, for his contribution to Education and Literature.
