= Business ethics =

Application of ethical principles to the area of business activities

Business ethics is a form of applied ethics or professional ethics that examines ethical principles and moral or ethical problems that can arise in a business environment. It applies to all aspects of business conduct and is relevant to the conduct of individuals and business organizations. These ethics originate from individuals, organizational statements or the legal system. These norms, values, ethical, and unethical practices are the principles that guide a business.

Business ethics refers to contemporary organizational standards, principles, sets of values, and norms that govern the actions and behavior of individuals in a business organization. Business ethics has two dimensions: normative business ethics and descriptive business ethics. As a corporate practice and a career specialization, the field is primarily normative. Academics attempting to understand business behavior employ descriptive methods. The range and quantity of business ethical issues reflect the interaction of profit-maximizing behavior with non-economic concerns.

Interest in business ethics accelerated dramatically during the 1980s and 1990s, both within major corporations and within academia. For example, most major corporations today promote their commitment to non-economic values under headings such as ethics codes and social responsibility charters.

Adam Smith said in 1776, "People of the same trade seldom meet together, even for merriment and diversion, but the conversation ends in a conspiracy against the public, or in some contrivance to raise prices." Governments use laws and regulations to direct business behavior in what they perceive to be beneficial directions. Ethics implicitly regulates areas and details of behavior that lie beyond governmental control. The emergence of large corporations with limited relationships and sensitivity to the communities in which they operate accelerated the development of formal ethics regimes.

Maintaining an ethical status is the responsibility of the manager of the business. According to a 1990 article in the Journal of Business Ethics, "Managing ethical behavior is one of the most pervasive and complex problems facing business organizations today."

== History ==
Business ethics reflect the norms of each historical period. As time passes, norms evolve, causing accepted behaviors to become objectionable. Business ethics and the resulting behavior evolved as well. Business was involved in slavery, colonialism, and the Cold War.

The term 'business ethics' came into common use in the United States in the early 1970s. By the mid-1980s, at least 500 courses in business ethics reached 40,000 students, using some twenty textbooks and at least ten casebooks supported by professional societies, centers and journals of business ethics. The Society for Business Ethics was founded in 1980. European business schools adopted business ethics after 1987, commencing with the European Business Ethics Network. In 1982, the first single-authored books in the field appeared.

Firms began highlighting their ethical stature in the late 1980s and early 1990s, possibly in an attempt to distance themselves from the business scandals of the day, such as the savings and loan crisis. The concept of business ethics caught the attention of academics, media and business firms by the end of the Cold War. However, criticism of business practices was attacked for infringing on the freedom of entrepreneurs and critics were accused of supporting communists. This scuttled the discourse of business ethics both in the media and academia. The Defense Industry Initiative on Business Ethics and Conduct (DII) was created to support corporate ethical conduct. This era began the belief and support of self-regulation and free trade, which lifted tariffs and barriers and allowed businesses to merge and divest in an increasingly global atmosphere.

=== Religious and philosophical origins ===
One of the earliest written treatments of business ethics is found in the Tirukkuṛaḷ, a Tamil book dated variously from 300 BCE to the 7th century CE and attributed to Thiruvalluvar. Many verses discuss business ethics, in particular, verse 113, adapting to a changing environment in verses 474, 426, and 140, learning the intricacies of different tasks in verses 462 and 677.

== Overview ==
Business ethics reflects the philosophy of business, which one of those aims is to determine the fundamental purposes of a company. Business purpose expresses the company's reason for existing. Modern discussion on the purpose of business has been freshened by views from thinkers such as Richard R. Ellesworth, Peter Drucker, and Nikos Mourkogiannis: Earlier views, such as Milton Friedman's, held that the purpose of a business organization is to make a profit for shareholders. Nevertheless, the purpose of maximizing shareholders' wealth often "fails to energize employees". In practice, many non-shareholders also benefit from a firm's economic activity, among them employees through contractual compensation and its broader impact, consumers by the tangible or non-tangible value derived from their purchase choices and society as a whole through taxation and/or the company's involvement in social action when it occurs. On the other hand, if a company's purpose is to maximize shareholder returns, then sacrificing profits for other concerns is a violation of its fiduciary responsibility. Corporate entities are legal persons but this does not mean they are legally entitled to all of the rights and liabilities of natural persons.

Ethics are the rules or standards that govern our decisions on a daily basis. Many consider "ethics" with conscience or a simplistic sense of "right" and "wrong". Others would say that ethics is an internal code that governs an individual's conduct, ingrained into each person by family, faith, tradition, community, laws, and personal mores. Corporations and professional organizations, particularly licensing boards, generally will have a written code of ethics that governs standards of professional conduct expected of all in the field. "Law" and "ethics" are not synonymous, nor are the "legal" and "ethical" courses of action in a given situation necessarily the same. Statutes and regulations passed by legislative bodies and administrative boards set forth the "law". Slavery was once legal in the US, but one certainly would not say enslaving another was an "ethical" act.

Economist Milton Friedman wrote that corporate executives' "responsibility ... generally will be to make as much money as possible while conforming to their basic rules of the society, both those embodied in law and those embodied in ethical custom". Friedman also said, "the only entities who can have responsibilities are individuals ... A business cannot have responsibilities. So the question is, do corporate executives, provided they stay within the law, have responsibilities in their business activities other than to make as much money for their stockholders as possible? And my answer to that is, no, they do not." This view is known as the Friedman doctrine. A multi-country 2011 survey found support for this view among the "informed public" ranging from 30 to 80%. Ronald Duska and Jacques Cory have described Friedman's argument as consequentialist or utilitarian rather than pragmatic: Friedman's argument implies that unrestrained corporate freedom would benefit the most people in the long term. Duska argued that Friedman failed to differentiate between two very different aspects of business: (1) the motive of individuals, who are generally motivated by profit to participate in business, and (2) the socially sanctioned purpose of business, or the reason why people allow businesses to exist, which is to provide goods and services to people. So Friedman was wrong that making a profit is the only concern of business, Duska argued.

Peter Drucker once said, "There is neither a separate ethics of business nor is one needed", implying that standards of personal ethics cover all business situations. However, Drucker in another instance said that the ultimate responsibility of company directors is not to harm—primum non nocere.

Philosopher and author Ayn Rand has put forth her idea of rational egoism, which also applies to business ethics. She stresses that the position of the entrepreneur, who has to be responsible for his own happiness and the business is a means to said happiness, where the entrepreneur is not required to serve the interest of anyone else and no one is entitled to his/her work.

Another view of business is that it must exhibit corporate social responsibility (CSR): an umbrella term indicating that an ethical business must act as a responsible citizen of the communities in which it operates, even at the cost of profits or other goals. In the US and most other nations, corporate entities are legally treated as persons in some respects. For example, they can hold title to property, sue and be sued and are subject to taxation, although their free speech rights are limited. This can be interpreted to imply that they have independent ethical responsibilities. Duska argued that stakeholders expect a business to be ethical and that violating that expectation must be counterproductive for the business.

Ethical issues include the rights and duties between a company and its employees, suppliers, customers and neighbors, its fiduciary responsibility to its shareholders. Issues concerning relations between different companies include hostile takeovers and industrial espionage. Related issues include corporate governance, corporate social entrepreneurship, political contributions, legal issues such as the ethical debate over introducing a crime of corporate manslaughter, and the marketing of corporations' ethics policies. According to research published by the Institute of Business Ethics and Ipsos MORI in late 2012, the three major areas of public concern regarding business ethics in Britain are executive pay, corporate tax avoidance and bribery and corruption.

The ethical standards of an entire organization can be damaged if a corporate psychopath is in charge. This will affect not only the company and its outcome but also the employees who work under a corporate psychopath. The way a corporate psychopath can rise in a company is by their manipulation, scheming, and bullying. They do this in a way that can hide their true character and intentions within a company.

== Functional business areas ==
=== Finance ===
Fundamentally, finance is a social science discipline. The discipline borders behavioral economics, sociology, economics, accounting and management. It concerns technical issues such as the mix of debt and equity, dividend policy, the evaluation of alternative investment projects, options, futures, swaps, and other derivatives, portfolio diversification and many others. Finance is often mistaken by people to be a discipline free from ethical burdens. The 2008 financial crisis caused critics to challenge the ethics of the executives in charge of U.S. and European financial institutions and financial regulatory bodies. Finance ethics is overlooked for another reason—issues in finance are often addressed as matters of law rather than ethics.

==== Finance paradigm ====
Aristotle said, "the end and purpose of the polis is the good life". Adam Smith characterized the good life in terms of material goods and intellectual and moral excellences of character. Smith, in his The Wealth of Nations, commented, "All for ourselves, and nothing for other people, seems, in every age of the world, to have been the vile maxim of the masters of mankind."

However, a section of economists influenced by the ideology of neoliberalism interpreted the objective of economics to be the maximization of economic growth through accelerated consumption and production of goods and services. Neoliberal ideology promoted finance from its position as a component of economics to its core. Proponents of the ideology hold that unrestricted financial flows, if redeemed from the shackles of "financial repressions", best help impoverished nations to grow. The theory holds that open financial systems accelerate economic growth by encouraging foreign capital inflows, thereby enabling higher levels of savings, investment, employment, productivity and "welfare", along with containing corruption. Neoliberals recommended that governments open their financial systems to the global market with minimal regulation over capital flows. The recommendations, however, met with criticisms from various schools of ethical philosophy. Some pragmatic ethicists found these claims to be unfalsifiable and a priori, although neither of these makes the recommendations false or unethical per se. Raising economic growth to the highest value necessarily means that welfare is subordinate, although advocates dispute this, saying that economic growth provides more welfare than known alternatives. Since history shows that neither regulated nor unregulated firms always behave ethically, neither regime offers an ethical panacea.

Neoliberal recommendations to developing countries to unconditionally open up their economies to transnational finance corporations were fiercely contested by some ethicists. The claim that deregulation and the opening up of economies would reduce corruption was also contested.

Dobson observes, "a rational agent is simply one who pursues personal material advantage ad infinitum. In essence, to be rational in finance is to be individualistic, materialistic, and competitive. Business is a game played by individuals, as with all games, the object is to win, and winning is measured in terms solely of material wealth. Within the discipline, this rationality concept is never questioned, and has indeed become the theory-of-the-firm's sine qua non". Financial ethics, is in this view, a mathematical function of shareholder wealth. Such simplifying assumptions were once necessary for the construction of mathematically robust models. However, signalling theory and agency theory extended the paradigm to greater realism.

==== Other issues ====
Fairness in trading practices, trading conditions, financial contracting, sales practices, consultancy services, tax payments, internal audit, external audit and executive compensation also fall under the umbrella of finance and accounting. Particular corporate ethical/legal abuses include: creative accounting, earnings management, misleading financial analysis, insider trading, securities fraud, bribery/kickbacks and facilitation payments. Outside of corporations, bucket shops and forex scams are criminal manipulations of financial markets. Cases include accounting scandals, Enron, WorldCom and Satyam.

=== Human resource management ===
Human resource management occupies the sphere of activity of recruitment selection, orientation, performance appraisal, training and development, industrial relations and health and safety issues. Business Ethicists differ in their orientation towards labor ethics. Some assess human resource policies according to whether they support an egalitarian workplace and the dignity of labor.

Issues including employment itself, privacy, compensation in accord with comparable worth, collective bargaining (and/or its opposite) can be seen either as inalienable rights or as negotiable. Discrimination by age (preferring the young or the old), gender/sexual harassment, race, religion, disability, weight and attractiveness. A common approach to remedying discrimination is affirmative action.

Once hired, employees have the right to the occasional cost-of-living increases, as well as raises based on merit. Promotions, however, are not a right, and there are often fewer openings than qualified applicants. It may seem unfair if an employee who has been with a company longer is passed over for a promotion, but it is not unethical. It is only unethical if the employer did not give the employee proper consideration or used improper criteria for the promotion. Each employer should know the distinction between what is unethical and what is illegal. If an action is illegal, it is breaking the law, but if an action seems morally incorrect, that is unethical. In the workplace, what is unethical does not mean illegal and should follow the guidelines put in place by OSHA (Occupational Safety and Health Administration), EEOC (Equal Employment Opportunity Commission), and other law-binding entities.

Potential employees have ethical obligations to employers, involving intellectual property protection and whistle-blowing.

Employers must consider workplace safety, which may involve modifying the workplace or providing appropriate training or hazard disclosure. This differentiates based on the location and type of work that is taking place and may require compliance with the standards to protect employees and non-employees under workplace safety.

Larger economic issues such as immigration, trade policy, globalization and trade unionism affect workplaces and have an ethical dimension, but are often beyond the purview of individual companies.

==== Trade unions ====
Trade unions, for example, may push employers to establish due process for workers, but may also cause job loss by demanding unsustainable compensation and work rules.

==== Management strategy ====
Among the many people management strategies that companies employ are a "soft" approach that regards employees as a source of creative energy and participants in workplace decision-making, a "hard" version explicitly focused on control and Theory Z that emphasizes philosophy, culture and consensus. None ensures ethical behavior. Some studies claim that sustainable success requires a humanely treated and satisfied workforce.

=== Procurement ===
In the procurement field, ethical behaviour includes adherence to the principle of fairness, avoidance of preferential treatment, and the elimination of malpractice in relation to suppliers and their workforces. The Chartered Institute of Procurement & Supply, which provides ethical procurement assessment for its members, notes that "it's important to recognise that being ethical isn't just within the business community, but consumers can also make ethical choices in their buying decisions".

=== Sales and marketing ===
Marketing ethics came of age only as late as the 1990s. Marketing ethics was approached from ethical perspectives of virtue or virtue ethics, deontology, consequentialism, pragmatism and relativism.

Ethics in marketing deals with the principles, values and/or ideas by which marketers (and marketing institutions) ought to act. Marketing ethics is also a contested terrain, beyond the previously described issue of potential conflicts between profitability and other concerns. Ethical marketing issues include marketing redundant or dangerous products/services, transparency about environmental risks, transparency about product ingredients such as genetically modified organisms possible health risks, financial risks, security risks, etc., respect for consumer privacy and autonomy, advertising truthfulness and fairness in pricing & distribution.

According to Borgerson and Schroeder (2008), marketing can influence individuals' perceptions of and interactions with other people, implying an ethical responsibility to avoid distorting those perceptions and interactions.

Marketing ethics involves pricing practices, including illegal actions such as price fixing and legal actions, including price discrimination and price skimming. Certain promotional activities have drawn fire, including greenwashing, bait and switch, shilling, viral marketing, spam (electronic), pyramid schemes and multi-level marketing. Advertising has raised objections about attack ads, subliminal messages, sex in advertising and marketing in schools.

=== Inter-organizational relationships ===
Scholars in business and management have paid much attention to the ethical issues in the different forms of relationships between organizations such as buyer-supplier relationships, networks, alliances, or joint ventures. Drawing in particular on transaction cost theory and agency theory, they note the risk of opportunistic and unethical practices between partners through, for instance, shirking, poaching, and other deceitful behaviors. In turn, research on inter-organizational relationships has observed the role of formal and informal mechanisms to both prevent unethical practices and mitigate their consequences. It especially discusses the importance of formal contracts and relational norms between partners to manage ethical issues.

=== Emerging issues ===
Being the most important element of a business, stakeholders' main concern is to determine whether or not the business is behaving ethically or unethically. The business's actions and decisions should be primarily ethical before they become an ethical or even legal issue. "In the case of the government, community, and society, what was merely an ethical issue can become a legal debate and eventually law." Some emerging ethical issues are:

- Corporate environmental responsibility: Businesses' impacts on ecosystemic environments can no longer be neglected and ecosystems' impacts on business activities are becoming more imminent.
- Fairness: The three aspects that motivate people to be fair is equality, optimization, and reciprocity. Fairness is the quality of being just, equitable, and impartial.
- Misuse of the company's time and resources: This particular topic may not seem to be a very common one, but it is very important, as it costs a company billions of dollars on a yearly basis. This misuse is from late arrivals, leaving early, long lunch breaks, inappropriate sick days, etc. This has been observed as a major form of misconduct in businesses today. One of the greatest ways employees participate in the misuse of the company's time and resources is by using the company computer for personal use.
- Consumer fraud: There are many different types of fraud, namely, friendly fraud, return fraud, wardrobing, price arbitrage, and returning stolen goods. Fraud is a major unethical practice within businesses that should be paid special attention to. Consumer fraud is when consumers attempt to deceive businesses for their own benefit.
- Abusive behavior: A common ethical issue among employees. Abusive behavior consists of inflicting intimidating acts on other employees. Such acts include harassing, using profanity, threatening someone physically and insulting them, and being annoying.

=== Production ===
This area of business ethics usually deals with the duties of a company to ensure that products and production processes do not needlessly cause harm. Since a few goods and services can be produced and consumed with zero risks, determining the ethical course can be difficult. In some cases, consumers demand products that harm them, such as tobacco products. Production may have environmental impacts, including pollution, habitat destruction and urban sprawl. The downstream effects of technologies, such as nuclear power, genetically modified food and mobile phones, may not be well understood. While the precautionary principle may prohibit introducing new technology whose consequences are not fully understood, that principle would have prohibited the newest technology introduced since the Industrial Revolution. Product testing protocols have been attacked for violating the rights of both humans and animals. Some sources that provide information on companies that are environmentally responsible or do not test on animals.

=== Property ===
The etymological root of property is the Latin proprius, which refers to 'nature', 'quality', 'one's own', 'special characteristic', 'proper', 'intrinsic', 'inherent', 'regular', 'normal', 'genuine', 'thorough, complete, perfect' etc. The word property is value-loaded and associated with the personal qualities of propriety and respectability, and it also implies questions relating to ownership. A 'proper' person owns and is true to herself or himself, and is thus genuine, perfect and pure.

==== Modern history of property rights ====
Modern discourse on property emerged by the turn of the 17th century within theological discussions of that time. For instance, John Locke justified property rights, saying that God had made "the earth, and all inferior creatures, [in] common to all men".

In 1802, utilitarian Jeremy Bentham stated, "property and law are born together and die together".

One argument for property ownership is that it enhances individual liberty by extending the line of non-interference by the state or others around the person. Seen from this perspective, property rights are absolute and property has a special and distinctive character that precedes its legal protection. Blackstone conceptualized property as the "sole and despotic dominion which one man claims and exercises over the external things of the world, in total exclusion of the right of any other individual in the universe".

===== Slaves as property =====
During the seventeenth and eighteenth centuries, slavery spread to European colonies, including America, where colonial legislatures defined the legal status of slaves as a form of property.

Combined with theological justification, the property was taken to be essentially natural, ordained by God. Property, which later gained meaning as ownership and appeared natural to Locke, Jefferson and to many of the 18th and 19th century intellectuals as land, labor or idea, and property right over slaves had the same theological and essentialized justification It was even held that the property in slaves was a sacred right. Wiecek says, "Yet slavery was more clearly and explicitly established under the Constitution than it had been under the Articles". In an 1857 judgment, US Supreme Court Chief Justice Roger B. Taney said, "The right of property in a slave is distinctly and expressly affirmed in the Constitution."

==== Natural right vs social construct ====
Neoliberals hold that private property rights are a non-negotiable natural right. Davies counters with "property is no different from other legal categories in that it is simply a consequence of the significance attached by law to the relationships between legal persons." Singer claims, "Property is a form of power, and the distribution of power is a political problem of the highest order". Rose finds, "'Property' is only an effect, a construction, of relationships between people, meaning that its objective character is contestable. Persons and things, are 'constituted' or 'fabricated' by legal and other normative techniques." Singer observes, "A private property regime is not, after all, a Hobbesian state of nature; it requires a working legal system that can define, allocate, and enforce property rights." Davis claims that common law theory generally favors the view that "property is not essentially a 'right to a thing', but rather a separable bundle of rights subsisting between persons which may vary according to the context and the object which is at stake".

In common parlance, property rights involve a bundle of rights including occupancy, use and enjoyment, and the right to sell, devise, give, or lease all or part of these rights. Custodians of property have obligations as well as rights. Michelman writes, "A property regime thus depends on a great deal of cooperation, trustworthiness, and self-restraint among the people who enjoy it."

Menon claims that the autonomous individual, responsible for his/her own existence, is a cultural construct moulded by Western culture rather than the truth about the human condition. Penner views property as an "illusion"—a "normative phantasm" without substance.

In the neoliberal literature, the property is part of the private side of a public/private dichotomy and acts as a counterweight to state power. Davies counters that "any space may be subject to plural meanings or appropriations which do not necessarily come into conflict".

Private property has never been a universal doctrine, although since the end of the Cold War, it has become nearly so. Some societies, e.g., Native American bands, held land, if not all property, in common. When groups came into conflict, the victor often appropriated the loser's property. The rights paradigm tended to stabilize the distribution of property holdings on the presumption that title had been lawfully acquired.

Property does not exist in isolation, and neither do property rights. Bryan claimed that property rights describe relations among people and not just relations between people and things. Singer holds that the idea that owners have no legal obligations to others wrongly supposes that property rights hardly ever conflict with other legally protected interests. Singer continues implying that legal realists "did not take the character and structure of social relations as an important independent factor in choosing the rules that govern market life". The ethics of property rights begins with recognizing the vacuous nature of the notion of property.

=== Intellectual property ===
Intellectual property (IP) encompasses expressions of ideas, thoughts, codes, and information. "Intellectual property rights" (IPR) treats IP as a kind of real property, subject to analogous protections, rather than as a reproducible good or service. Boldrin and Levine argue that "government does not ordinarily enforce monopolies for producers of other goods. This is because it is widely recognized that a monopoly creates many social costs. Intellectual monopoly is no different in this respect. The question we address is whether it also creates social benefits commensurate with these social costs."

International standards relating to intellectual property rights are enforced through the Agreement on Trade-Related Aspects of Intellectual Property Rights. Within the United States, the United States Patent and Trademark Office (USPTO) grants patents and registers trademarks, while the United States Copyright Office (USCO) administers copyright law.

The US Constitution included the power to protect intellectual property, empowering the Federal government "to promote the progress of science and useful arts, by securing for limited times to authors and inventors the exclusive right to their respective writings and discoveries". Boldrin and Levine see no value in such state-enforced monopolies, stating, "we ordinarily think of innovative monopoly as an oxymoron. Further, they comment, 'intellectual property' "is not like ordinary property at all, but constitutes a government grant of a costly and dangerous private monopoly over ideas. We show through theory and example that intellectual monopoly is not necessary for innovation and, as a practical matter, is damaging to growth, prosperity, and liberty". Steelman defends patent monopolies, writing, "Consider prescription drugs, for instance. Such drugs have benefited millions of people, improving or extending their lives. Patent protection enables drug companies to recoup their development costs because, for a specific period of time, they have the sole right to manufacture and distribute the products they have invented." The court cases by 39 pharmaceutical companies against South Africa's 1997 Medicines and Related Substances Control Amendment Act, which intended to provide affordable HIV medicines, have been cited as a harmful effect of patents.

One attack on IPR is moral rather than utilitarian, claiming that inventions are mostly a collective, cumulative, path-dependent, social creation and therefore, no one person or firm should be able to monopolize them even for a limited period. The opposing argument is that the benefits of innovation arrive sooner when patents encourage innovators and their investors to increase their commitments.

Roderick T. Long, a libertarian philosopher, argued:

Ethically, property rights of any kind have to be justified as extensions of the right of individuals to control their own lives. Thus, any alleged property rights that conflict with this moral basis—like the "right" to own slaves—are invalidated. In my judgment, intellectual property rights also fail to pass this test. To enforce copyright laws and the like is to prevent people from making peaceful use of the information they possess. If you have acquired the information legitimately (say, by buying a book), then on what grounds can you be prevented from using it, reproducing it, or trading it? Is this not a violation of the freedom of speech and the press? It may be objected that the person who originated the information deserves ownership rights over it. But information is not a concrete thing an individual can control; it is universal, existing in other people's minds and other people's property, and over these, the originator has no legitimate sovereignty. You cannot own information without owning other people.

Machlup concluded that patents do not have the intended effect of enhancing innovation. Self-declared anarchist Proudhon, in his 1847 seminal work, noted, "Monopoly is the natural opposite of competition," and continued, "Competition is the vital force which animates the collective being: to destroy it, if such a supposition were possible, would be to kill society."

Mindeli and Pipiya argued that the knowledge economy is an economy of abundance because it relies on the "infinite potential" of knowledge and ideas rather than on the limited resources of natural resources, labor and capital. Allison envisioned an egalitarian distribution of knowledge. Kinsella claimed that IPR create artificial scarcity and reduce equality. Bouckaert wrote, "Natural scarcity is that which follows from the relationship between man and nature. Scarcity is natural when it is possible to conceive of it before any human, institutional, or contractual arrangement. Artificial scarcity, on the other hand, is the outcome of such arrangements. Artificial scarcity can hardly serve as a justification for the legal framework that causes that scarcity. Such an argument would be completely circular. On the contrary, artificial scarcity itself needs a justification". Corporations fund much IP creation and can acquire IP they do not create, to which Menon and others have objected. Andersen claims that IPR has increasingly become an instrument in eroding the public domain.

Ethical and legal issues include patent infringement, copyright infringement, trademark infringement, patent and copyright misuse, submarine patents, biological patents, patent, copyright and trademark trolling, employee raiding and monopolizing talent, bioprospecting, biopiracy and industrial espionage, and digital rights management.

Notable IP copyright cases include A&M Records, Inc. v. Napster, Inc., Eldred v. Ashcroft, and Disney's lawsuit against the Air Pirates.

== International issues ==
While business ethics emerged as a field in the 1970s, international business ethics did not emerge until the late 1990s, looking back on the international developments of that decade. Many new practical issues arose out of the international context of business. Theoretical issues such as the cultural relativity of ethical values receive more emphasis in this field. Other, older issues can be grouped here as well. Issues and subfields include:

- The search for universal values as a basis for international commercial behavior
- Comparison of business ethical traditions in different countries and on the basis of their respective GDP and corruption rankings
- Comparison of business ethical traditions from various religious perspectives
- Ethical issues arising out of international business transactions—e.g., bioprospecting and biopiracy in the pharmaceutical industry; the fair trade movement; transfer pricing.
- Issues such as globalization and cultural imperialism
- Varying global standards—e.g., the use of child labor
- The way in which multinationals take advantage of international differences, such as outsourcing production (e.g. clothes) and services (e.g. call centers) to low-wage countries
- The permissibility of international commerce with pariah states

Foreign countries often use dumping as a competitive threat, selling products at prices lower than their normal value. This can lead to problems in domestic markets, as it becomes difficult for them to compete with the pricing set by foreign markets. In 2009, the International Trade Commission conducted research on anti-dumping laws. Dumping is often seen as an ethical issue, as larger companies take advantage of other, less economically advanced companies.

== Issues ==
Ethical issues often arise in business settings, whether through business transactions or forming new business relationships. It also has a huge focus in the auditing field, whereby the type of verification can be directly dictated by ethical theory. An ethical issue in a business atmosphere may refer to any situation that requires business associates as individuals, or as a group (for example, a department or firm) to evaluate the morality of specific actions, and subsequently, make a decision among the choices. Some ethical issues of particular concern in today's evolving business market include such topics as honesty, integrity, professional behaviors, environmental issues, harassment, and fraud, to name a few. From a 2009 National Business Ethics survey, it was found that types of employee-observed ethical misconduct included abusive behavior (at a rate of 22 percent), discrimination (at a rate of 14 percent), improper hiring practices (at a rate of 10 percent), and company resource abuse (at a rate of percent).

The ethical issues associated with honesty are widespread and vary greatly in business, from the misuse of company time or resources to lying with malicious intent, engaging in bribery, or creating conflicts of interest within an organization. Honesty encompasses the truthful speech and actions of an individual wholly. Some cultures and belief systems even consider honesty to be an essential pillar of life, such as Confucianism and Buddhism (referred to as sacca, part of the Four Noble Truths). Many employees lie in order to reach goals, avoid assignments or negative issues; however, sacrificing honesty in order to gain status or reap rewards poses potential problems for the overall ethical culture organization, and jeopardizes organizational goals in the long run. Using company time or resources for personal use is also commonly viewed as unethical because it boils down to stealing from the company. The misuse of resources costs companies billions of dollars each year, averaging about 4.25 hours per week of stolen time alone, and employees' abuse of Internet services is another main concern. Bribery, on the other hand, is not only considered unethical in business practices, but it is also illegal. In accordance with this, the Foreign Corrupt Practices Act was established in 1977 to deter international businesses from giving or receiving unwarranted payments and gifts that were intended to influence the decisions of executives and political officials. Although small payments known as facilitation payments will not be considered unlawful under the Foreign Corrupt Practices Act if they are used towards regular public governance activities, such as permits or licenses.

== Influential factors on business ethics ==
Many aspects of the work environment influence an individual's decision-making regarding ethics in the business world. When an individual is on the path of growing a company, many outside influences can pressure them to perform a certain way. The core of a person's performance in the workplace is rooted in their personal code of behavior. A person's personal code of ethics encompasses many different qualities such as integrity, honesty, communication, respect, compassion, and common goals. In addition, the ethical standards set forth by a person's superior(s) often translate into their own code of ethics. The company's policy is the 'umbrella' of ethics that plays a major role in the personal development and decision-making processes that people make with respect to ethical behavior.

National economic conditions often shape corporate ethics. In environments marked by high poverty, large corporations may continue to expand, while smaller firms face significant survival challenges. This pressure can lead leadership to explore unconventional or unethical avenues to secure business opportunities. Similarly, social media has become a primary influence on ethical standards. The constant flow of information and public opinion can pressure individuals to conform to perceived norms. Consequently, fast-moving digital trends and the drive for instant engagement can alter how people evaluate moral and professional decisions.

== Economic systems ==
Political economy and political philosophy have ethical implications, particularly regarding the distribution of economic benefits. John Rawls and Robert Nozick are both notable contributors. For example, Rawls has been interpreted as offering a critique of offshore outsourcing on social contract grounds.

== Law and regulation ==
Laws are the written statutes, codes, and opinions of government organizations by which citizens, businesses, and persons present within a jurisdiction are expected to govern themselves or face legal sanction. Sanctions for violating the law can include (a) civil penalties, such as fines, pecuniary damages, and loss of licenses, property, rights, or privileges; (b) criminal penalties, such as fines, probation, imprisonment, or a combination thereof; or (c) both civil and criminal penalties.

Very often, it is held that business is not bound by any ethics other than abiding by the law. Milton Friedman is the pioneer of the view. He held that corporations have the obligation to make a profit within the framework of the legal system, nothing more. Friedman made it explicit that the duty of the business leaders is "to make as much money as possible while conforming to the basic rules of the society, both those embodied in the law and those embodied in ethical custom". Ethics for Friedman is nothing more than abiding by customs and laws. The reduction of ethics to abidance to laws and customs, however, has drawn serious criticisms.

Counter to Friedman's logic, it is observed that legal procedures are technocratic, bureaucratic, rigid and obligatory whereas ethical act is conscientious, voluntary choice beyond normativity. Law is retroactive. Crime precedes law. For Law against crime to be passed, the crime must have happened. Laws are blind to the crimes undefined in them. Further, as per law, "conduct is not criminal unless forbidden by law which gives advance warning that such conduct is criminal". Also, the law presumes the accused is innocent until proven guilty and that the state must establish the guilt of the accused beyond a reasonable doubt. As per liberal laws followed in most of the democracies, until the government prosecutor proves the firm guilty with the limited resources available to her, the accused is considered to be innocent. Though the liberal premises of law are necessary to protect individuals from being persecuted by the government, it is not a sufficient mechanism to make firms morally accountable.

== Implementation ==
=== Corporate policies ===
As part of more comprehensive compliance and ethics programs, many companies have formulated internal policies pertaining to the ethical conduct of employees. These policies can be simple exhortations in broad, highly generalized language (typically called a corporate ethics statement), or they can be more detailed policies, containing specific behavioral requirements (typically called corporate ethics codes). They are generally meant to identify the company's expectations of workers and to offer guidance on handling some of the more common ethical problems that might arise in the course of doing business. It is hoped that having such a policy will lead to greater ethical awareness, consistency in application, and the avoidance of ethical disasters.

An increasing number of companies also require employees to attend seminars regarding business conduct, which often include discussion of the company's policies, specific case studies, and legal requirements. Some companies even require their employees to sign agreements stating that they will abide by the company's rules of conduct.

Many companies are assessing the environmental factors that can lead employees to engage in unethical conduct. A competitive business environment may call for unethical behavior. Lying has become expected in fields such as trading. An example of this is the issues surrounding the unethical actions of the Salomon Brothers.

Not everyone supports corporate policies that govern ethical conduct. Some claim that ethical problems are better dealt with by depending upon employees to use their own judgment.

Others believe that corporate ethics policies are primarily rooted in utilitarian concerns and that they are mainly to limit the company's legal liability or to curry public favor by giving the appearance of being a good corporate citizen. Ideally, the company will avoid a lawsuit because its employees will follow the rules. Should a lawsuit occur, the company can claim that the problem would not have arisen if the employee had only followed the code properly.

Some corporations have tried to burnish their ethical image by creating whistle-blower protections, such as anonymity. In the case of Citi, they call this the Ethics Hotline. Though it is unclear whether firms such as Citi take offences reported to these hotlines seriously or not. Sometimes there is a disconnection between the company's code of ethics and the company's actual practices. Thus, whether or not such conduct is explicitly sanctioned by management, at worst, this makes the policy duplicitous, and, at best, it is merely a marketing tool.

Jones and Parker wrote, "Most of what we read under the name business ethics is either sentimental common sense or a set of excuses for being unpleasant." Many manuals are procedural form-filling exercises, unconcerned about the real ethical dilemmas. For instance, the US Department of Commerce ethics program treats business ethics as a set of instructions and procedures to be followed by 'ethics officers'. Some others claim that being ethical is just for the sake of being ethical. Business ethicists may trivialize the subject, offering standard answers that do not reflect the situation's complexity.

Richard DeGeorge wrote in regard to the importance of maintaining a corporate code:

Corporate codes have certain usefulness and there are several advantages to developing them. First, the very exercise of doing so in itself is worthwhile, especially if it forces a large number of people in the firm to think through, in a fresh way, their mission and the important obligations they as a group and as individuals have to the firm, to each other, to their clients and customers, and to society as a whole. Second, once adopted, a code can be used to generate continuing discussion and possible modification to the code. Third, it could help to inculcate in new employees at all levels the perspective of responsibility, the need to think in moral terms about their actions, and the importance of developing the virtues appropriate to their position.

Ethics codes often state a company's view on DEI (diversity, equity, inclusivity). In 2025, some companies began changing their ethics policies to reduce the focus on DEI, and some companies have decided to completely eliminate DEI from their policies.

=== Ethics officers ===
Following a series of fraud, corruption, and abuse scandals that affected the United States defense industry in the mid-1980s, the Defense Industry Initiative (DII) was created to promote ethical business practices and ethics management in multiple industries. Subsequent to these scandals, many organizations began appointing ethics officers (also referred to as "compliance" officers). In 1991, the Ethics & Compliance Officer Association —originally the Ethics Officer Association (EOA)—was founded at the Center for Business Ethics at Bentley University as a professional association for ethics and compliance officers.

The 1991 passing of the Federal Sentencing Guidelines for Organizations in 1991 was another factor in many companies appointing ethics/compliance officers. These guidelines, intended to assist judges with sentencing, set standards organizations must follow to obtain a reduction in sentence if they are convicted of a federal offense.

Following the high-profile corporate scandals of companies like Enron, WorldCom and Tyco between 2001 and 2004, and following the passage of the Sarbanes–Oxley Act, many small and mid-sized companies also began to appoint ethics officers.

Often reporting to the chief executive officer, ethics officers focus on uncovering or preventing unethical and illegal actions. This is accomplished by assessing the ethical implications of the company's activities, making recommendations on ethical policies, and disseminating information to employees.

The effectiveness of ethics officers is not clear. The establishment of an ethics officer position is likely to be insufficient in driving ethical business practices without a corporate culture that values ethical behavior. These values and behaviors should be consistently and systemically supported by those at the top of the organization. Employees with strong community involvement, loyalty to employers, superiors or owners, smart work practices, and trust among the team members do inculcate a corporate culture.

=== Sustainability initiatives ===
Many corporate and business strategies now include sustainability. In addition to the traditional environmental 'green' sustainability concerns, business ethics practices have expanded to include social sustainability. Social sustainability focuses on issues related to human capital in the business supply chain, such as workers' rights, working conditions, child labor, and human trafficking. Incorporation of these considerations is increasing, as consumers and procurement officials demand documentation of a business's compliance with national and international initiatives, guidelines, and standards. Many industries have organizations dedicated to verifying ethical delivery of products from start to finish, such as the Kimberly Process, which aims to stop the flow of conflict diamonds into international markets, or the Fair Wear Foundation, dedicated to sustainability and fairness in the garment industry.

Initiatives in sustainability encompass "green" topics, as well as social sustainability. Tao et al. refer to a variety of "green" business practices, including green strategy, green design, green production and green operation. There are however, many different ways in which sustainability initiatives can be implemented by a company.

==== Improving operations ====
An organization can implement sustainability initiatives by improving its operations and manufacturing processes so as to make it more aligned with environmental, social, and governance issues. Johnson & Johnson incorporates policies from the Universal Declaration of Human Rights, International Covenant on Civil and Political Rights and International Covenant on Economic, Social and Cultural Rights, applying these principles not only for members of its supply chain but also to its internal operations. Walmart has made commitments to doubling its truck fleet efficiency by 2015 by replacing 2/3rds of its fleet with more fuel-efficient trucks, including hybrids. Dell has integrated alternative, recycled, and recyclable materials in its products and packaging design, improving energy efficiency and design for end-of-life and recyclability. Dell plans to reduce the energy intensity of its product portfolio by 80% by 2020.

==== Board leadership ====
The board of a company can decide to lower executive compensation by a given percentage, and give the percentage of compensation to a specific cause. This is an effort which can only be implemented from the top, as it will affect the compensation of all executives in the company. In Alcoa, an aluminum company based in the US, "1/5th of executive cash compensation is tied to safety, diversity, and environmental stewardship, which includes greenhouse gas emission reductions and energy efficiency" (Best Practices). This is not usually the case for most companies, where we see the board take a uniform step towards the environment, social, and governance issues. This is only the case for companies that are directly linked to utilities, energy, or material industries, something which Alcoa as an aluminum company, falls in line with. Instead, formal committees focused on the environment, social, and governance issues are more usually seen in governance committees and audit committees, rather than the board of directors. "According to research analysis done by Pearl Meyer in support of the NACD 2017 Director Compensation Report shows that among 1,400 public companies reviewed, only slightly more than five percent of boards have a designated committee to address ESG issues." (How compensation can).

==== Management accountability ====
Similar to board leadership, creating steering committees and other types of committees specialized for sustainability, senior executives are identified who are held accountable for meeting and constantly improving sustainability goals.

==== Executive compensation ====
Introducing bonus schemes that reward executives for meeting non-financial performance, goals including safety targets, greenhouse gas emissions, reduction targets, and goals engaging stakeholders to help shape the company's public policy positions. Companies such as Exelon have implemented policies like this.

==== Stakeholder engagement ====
Other companies will keep sustainability within their strategy and goals, presenting findings at shareholder meetings, and actively tracking metrics on sustainability. Companies such as PepsiCo, Heineken, and FIFCO take steps in this direction to implement sustainability initiatives. (Best Practices). Companies such as Coca-Cola have actively tried to improve their efficiency of water usage, hiring 3rd party auditors to evaluate their water management approach. FIFCO has also successfully led water-management initiatives.

==== Employee engagement ====
Implementation of sustainability projects through directly appealing to employees (typically through the human resource department) is another option for companies to implement sustainability. This involves integrating sustainability into the company culture, with hiring practices and employee training. General Electric is a company that is taking the lead in implementing initiatives in this manner. Bank of America directly engaged employees by implementing LEED (Leadership in Energy and Environmental Design) certified buildings, with a fifth of its building meeting these certifications.

==== Supply chain management ====
Establishing requirements for not only internal operations but also first-tier suppliers as well as second-tier suppliers to help drive environmental and social expectations further down the supply chain. Companies such as Starbucks, FIFCO and Ford Motor Company have implemented requirements that suppliers must meet to win their business. Starbucks has led efforts in engaging suppliers and local communities where they operate to accelerate investment in sustainable farming. Starbucks set a goal of ethically sourcing 100% of its coffee beans by 2015.

==== Transparency ====
By revealing decision-making data about how sustainability was reached, companies can give away insights that can help others across the industry and beyond make more sustainable decisions. Nike launched its "making app" in 2013, which released data about the sustainability of the materials it was using. This ultimately allows other companies to make more sustainable design decisions and create lower-impact products.

== Academic discipline ==
As an academic discipline, business ethics emerged in the 1970s. Since no academic business ethics journals or conferences existed, researchers published in general management journals and attended general conferences. Over time, specialized peer-reviewed journals appeared, and more researchers entered the field. Corporate scandals in the early 2000s increased the field's popularity. As of 2009, sixteen academic journals devoted to various business ethics issues existed, with Journal of Business Ethics and Business Ethics Quarterly considered the leaders. Journal of Business Ethics Education publishes articles specifically about education in business ethics.

The International Business Development Institute is a global non-profit organization that represents 217 nations and all 50 United States. It offers a Charter in Business Development that focuses on ethical business practices and standards. The Charter is directed by Harvard University, MIT, and Fulbright Scholars, and it includes graduate-level coursework in economics, politics, marketing, management, technology, and legal aspects of business development as it pertains to business ethics. IBDI also oversees the International Business Development Institute of Asia, which provides individuals living in 20 Asian nations the opportunity to earn the Charter.

== Religious views ==
In Sharia law, followed by many Muslims, banking specifically prohibits charging interest on loans. Traditional Confucian thought discourages profit-seeking. According to the article "Theory of the real economy", there is a narrower point of view from the Christian faith towards the relationship between ethics and religious traditions. This article stresses how Christianity is capable of establishing reliable boundaries for financial institutions. One criticism comes from Pope Benedict who describes the "damaging effects of the real economy of badly managed and largely speculative financial dealing." It is mentioned that Christianity has the potential to transform the nature of finance and investment, but only if theologians and ethicists provide more evidence of what is real in the economic life. Business ethics receives an extensive treatment in Jewish thought and Rabbinic literature, both from an ethical (Mussar) and a legal (Halakha) perspective; see the article Jewish business ethics for further discussion. According to the article "Indian Philosophy and Business Ethics: A Review", by Chandrani Chattopadyay, Hindus follow "Dharma" as Business Ethics and unethical business practices are termed "Adharma". Businessmen are supposed to maintain steadiness, self-purification, non-violence, concentration, clarity and control over their senses. Books like the Bhagavat Gita and the Arthashastra contribute a lot towards the conduct of ethical business.

== Related disciplines ==
Business ethics is related to philosophy of economics, the branch of the philosophy that deals with the philosophical, political, and ethical underpinnings of business and economics. Valon Lluka writes: "Business ethics operates on the premise, for example, that the ethical operation of a private business is possible—those who dispute that premise, such as libertarian socialists (who contend that 'business ethics' is an oxymoron), do so by definition outside of the domain of business ethics proper."

The philosophy of economics also deals with questions such as what, if any, are the social responsibilities of a business; business management theory; theories of individualism vs. collectivism; free will among participants in the marketplace; the role of self interest; invisible hand theories; the requirements of social justice; and natural rights, especially property rights, in relation to the business enterprise.

Business ethics is also related to political economy, which is an economic analysis from political and historical perspectives. Political economy deals with the distributive consequences of economic actions.

== See also ==
- B Corporation (certification) – Social and environmental certification of for-profit companies
- Business culture – Customary behaviours in an organization
- Business law – Rules and guidelines of trade
- Corporate behaviour – Actions of a company or other corporate group
- Corporate crime – Crimes committed either by a corporation or its representatives
- Corporate social responsibility – Form of corporate self-regulation aimed at contributing to social or charitable goals
- Eastern ethics in business – East and Southeast Asian ethics in business
- Ethical altruism – Ethical belief that actions are morally good only if they benefit others / Ethical egoism
- Ethical code – Ethical concept
- Ethical consumerism – Type of consumer activism
- Ethical implications in contracts
- Ethical job – Ethical framework
- Ethicism – Philosophical study of morality
- Evil corporation – Corporation that ignores social responsibility
- Moral psychology – Interdisciplinary field of study
- Optimism bias – Type of cognitive bias
- Organizational ethics – Field of ethics focusing on organizations
- Penny stock scam – Form of securities fraud
- Philosophy and economics – Branch of philosophy
- Political corruption – Use of power by government officials for illegitimate private gain
- Strategic misrepresentation – Cognitive bias of underestimating time needed
- Strategic planning – Organizational decision making process
- Work ethic – Belief in the virtues of labor
  - Protestant work ethic – Social-theologic concept
