= Ian Pratt =

Ian Pratt may refer to:

- Ian Pratt (computer scientist), chief architect of the open-source Xen project and chairman of Xen.org
- Ian Pratt (politician), member of the Western Australian Legislative Assembly
