= Philosophy of business =

Fundamental principles of business

The philosophy of business considers the fundamental principles that underlie the formation and operation of a business enterprise; the nature and purpose of a business, and the moral obligations that pertain to it.

== See also ==
- Business ethics
- Theory of the firm
