= Xenoserver =

A XenoServer is a server that can safely execute foreign, potentially untrusted code. The XenoServer is developed collaboratively by Telekom Innovation Laboratories and Cambridge University and implemented using the Xen VMM.

The XenoServer platform is a network of XenoServers meant to support distributed code execution services.

The name comes from the Greek word ξένος, which can mean both "foreigner" and "guest", hence the notion of inviting foreign code to run on your server as a guest.
