= Ian Pratt (computer scientist) =

British computer scientist

Ian Pratt is a British computer scientist. He was the chief architect of the open-source Xen project, and chairman of Xen.org. He was also the founder of XenSource, the company behind Xen project. After XenSource was acquired by Citrix, he became vice president of Advanced Virtualization Products at this company, until leaving in 2011. He then became the CEO of Bromium. Bromium was eventually acquired by HP Inc in 2019, and he became the Global Head of Security at HP.

Before working full-time at XenSource, Pratt was a senior lecturer at the University of Cambridge Computer Laboratory where he taught undergraduate courses and supervised PhD students, and was a Fellow of King's College, Cambridge. He was the leader of the Systems Research Group, where he was also part of the XenoServer project that lead to the creation of the Xen hypervisor. He co-founded Nemesys Research Ltd, a company that broadcast video over ATM networks, which was acquired by FORE Systems in 1997.

He received the Academy Silver Medal in 2009 and was elected to Royal Academy of Engineering in 2012. He resides in Cambridge, UK.
