= Chorla Ghat =

Nature destination in the Western Ghats

Coordinates: 15.650354°N 74.124327°E

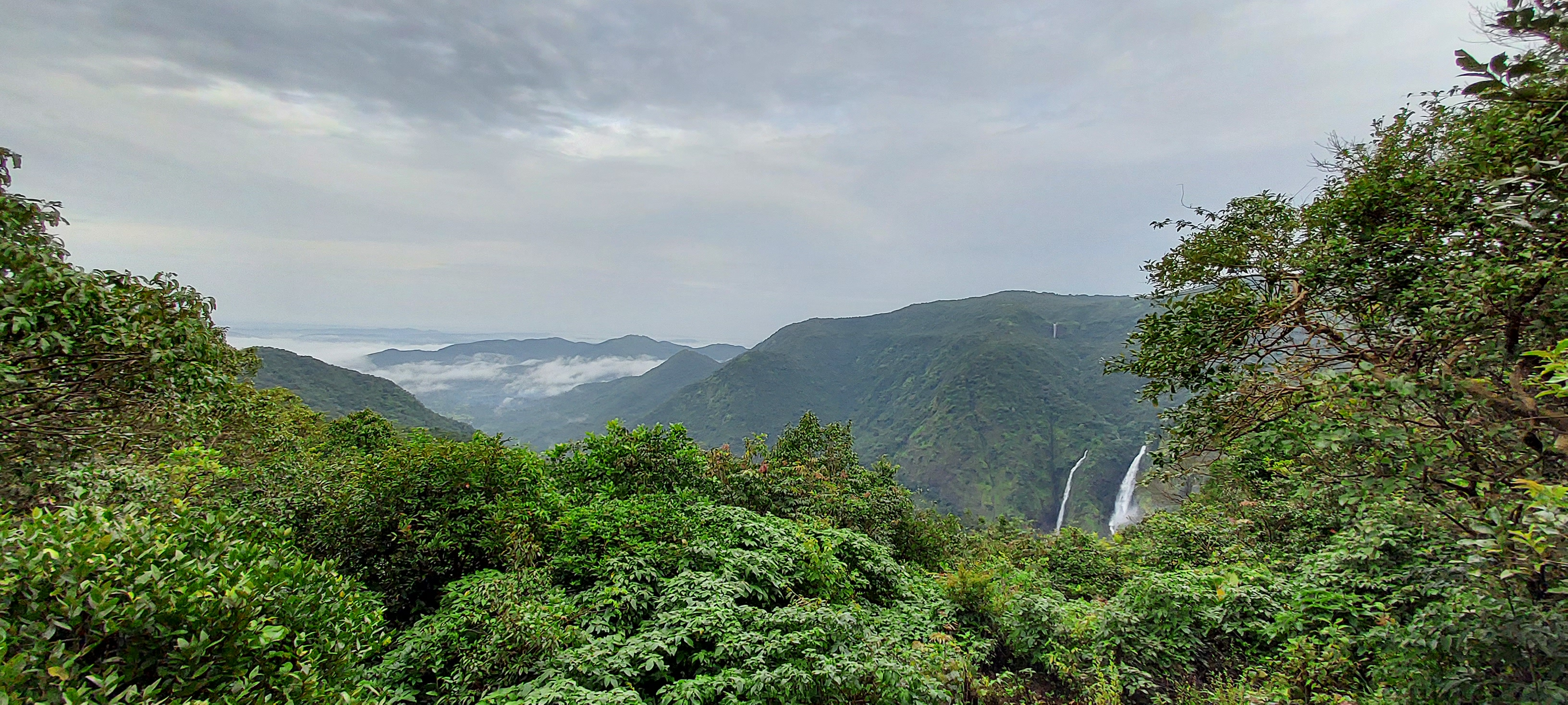
Chorla ghat view point

Chorla Ghat (Marathi: चोरला घाट Kannada: ಚೋರ್ಲಾ ಘಾಟ್) is an Indian nature destination, located on the intersection of the borders of the states of Goa, Karnataka, and Maharashtra. It lies to the north-east of Panaji, Goa (about 50 km (31 miles) by road) and nearly 55 kilometres (34 miles) from Belgaum in Karnataka. It is a part of the Western Ghats in the Sahyadri mountain range, and is at an elevation of 800 metres (2,600 feet). The ghat boasts of a few rare species of wild-life such as the barred wolf snake (Lycodon striatus) in its sub-tropical forests.

During late September

The Nature Conservation Facility has been established at Chorla Ghat to facilitate research and long term monitoring of the Western Ghats of the Sahyadris region and their biodiversity and is intended at providing a platform for ecologists and wildlife biologists by way of a fully equipped field station for this area.

Places to visit include Twin Vajra Waterfalls and Peak of Lasni Temb. Activities include: Foot trail, Jungle walks, Treks and hike, Machans and hide.
