= Purpose: The Starting Point =

2005 book by Nikos Mourkogiannis

Purpose: The Starting Point of Great Companies
- Author: Nikos Mourkogiannis
- Language: English
- Genre: Business
- Publisher: St. Martin's Griffin
- Publication date: 2006
- Publication place: United States

Purpose: The Starting Point of Great Companies, is a book by Nikos Mourkogiannis originally published in 2006, which has been reviewed in US national media, and repeatedly cited in corporate culture books and academic journals. The volume consists of one introduction and 11 chapters covering exemplified discussions on notions that the author regards as important with respect to the purpose of business: innovation, excellence, commitment to customers, competitiveness and leadership. The text is preceded by a foreword by the late Harvard Law Professor Roger Fisher. The book was published by St. Martin's Griffin, N.Y.
