= Eastern ethics in business =

East and Southeast Asian ethics in business

Eastern ethics encompasses the ethics or ways of thinking derived from East and Southeast Asia. This includes Chinese, Middle Eastern, Indian and Japanese ethics, as well as their influence on business. Through a combination of globalisation and growing diversity, Eastern ethics and spiritual practices have become prominent within businesses and their conduct. Across the Eastern and Oriental region, differing ethics arise from historic philosophies, religions or ways of thinking and may prohibit or encourage specific conduct.

== Chinese ethics ==
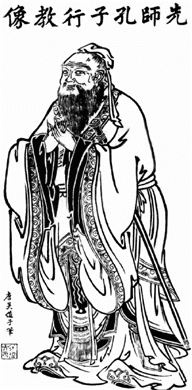
Illustration of Confucius

=== Confucian ===
Confucianism originates from China and details the social values, institutions, rituals, virtues and transcendental ideals. Confucian ethics develops the personal characters and virtues of benevolence, ritual propriety, righteousness, wisdom and integrity. These teachings were developed by Confucius (551–479 B.C.E.) and overlap with commercial activity and relations.

=== Classical Confucians ===
Benevolence (or Ren) is a Confucian ethic that necessitates a person to uphold this characteristic within a business or non-business interaction, which mirrors the historic expectation of rulers demonstrating benevolence. Mencius (Mencius, 1970, p. 49) stated that "What is the point of mentioning the word ‘profit’? All that matters is that there should be benevolence and rightness", which entails that profit in business is reasonable if delivered through benevolence and rightness. Business practices are also considered to be carried out with sincerity, as indicated by the Analects. On a government level, benevolence is expected to ensure welfare and responsibilities are fulfilled with moral leadership.

=== Neo-Confucians ===
Neo-Confucianism considers an approach based on speculative metaphysical truth combined with personal self-cultivation in social ethics. This theory was established by Zhu Xi during the Song dynasty and was derived through the classical Confucius texts from the Doctrine of the Mean, the Analects and Mencius. His theory states that people are considered good by the way they display their endowments and social and familial environment. In terms of business, profits, wealth, position and selfish desires are intolerable when engaging in commercial activity as these human desires override the moral principle of self-cultivation and allow the purified mind to naturally respond to these situations.

Under the Ming dynasty, Wang Yangming had a different approach to Neo-Confucian ethics in commercial activity to than Zhu. His ethical approach centralises on the combination of action and knowledge, or personal morality, defining social well-being. Vulgar Learning saw memorisation, recitation, broad learning and textual studies as knowledge accrued externally, but should instead rely on the moral principles (li) of the external world. By uniting thought and action, people should act in accordance to with Heaven and Earth and should be reflected in business activity.

== Middle Eastern ethics ==
=== Islam ===
In the Middle East, Islam is the most dominant religion in this region as 62% Muslims globally live here, and provides an ethical structure for commercial conduct and practices for people. Islam originated in the seventh century, 610 A.D., through Muhammad (570 A.D. – 632 A.D.) after receiving an angelic visitation that is believed to be the final prophet from God regarding faith to humanity. There is also a firm belief in one God, Allah, and all conduct, including commercial conduct, undertaken by an individual is associated with worshipping Allah. Virtuous or vicious conduct is judged under the Quran and Sunnah from the Hadith.

In Islamic culture, Muslims are expected to adhere to the five pillars of Islam and the Islamic code of ethics and thereby act in accordance with what is considered halal, not haram. A businessperson is expected to act in an ethical manner with Allah at the foremost intention and then ethically with other businessmen. Islamic ethics dictate abstinence from corruption, misuse of power and fraud, whilst simultaneously encouraging efficiency, integrity, collaboration and respect amongst employees. This all falls under the indivisible concept of oneness, called Tawhid, which details the importance of an individual and their god, other individuals and their environment.

Considering the legal landscape, Islam still remains a part of the written laws and underpins the ongoing commercial and trading practices. The Sharia once formulated a significant part of the written law in Muslim countries; however, since the 19th century, numerous countries have become influenced by Western colonial powers and have seen a mix between Western laws and Sharia Law. These countries include Pakistan, Israel and Egypt, whilst Turkey has adopted a more secular legal system. In the 20th century, the Sharia has become more adaptive to modern circumstances and still preserves the ethical foundations of Islam. This is seen particularly in Iran and Saudi Arabia, which have traditionally upheld a classical Sharia. Businesses operating in countries that experience a legal system that is prominently dictated by Islamic law experience restraints in operation if their activity compels interest on consumers by protecting the welfare of parties involved. Also, the strict nature of Islamic law restricts the way businesses engage in interest or risky activity.

== Indian ethics ==
=== Hinduism ===
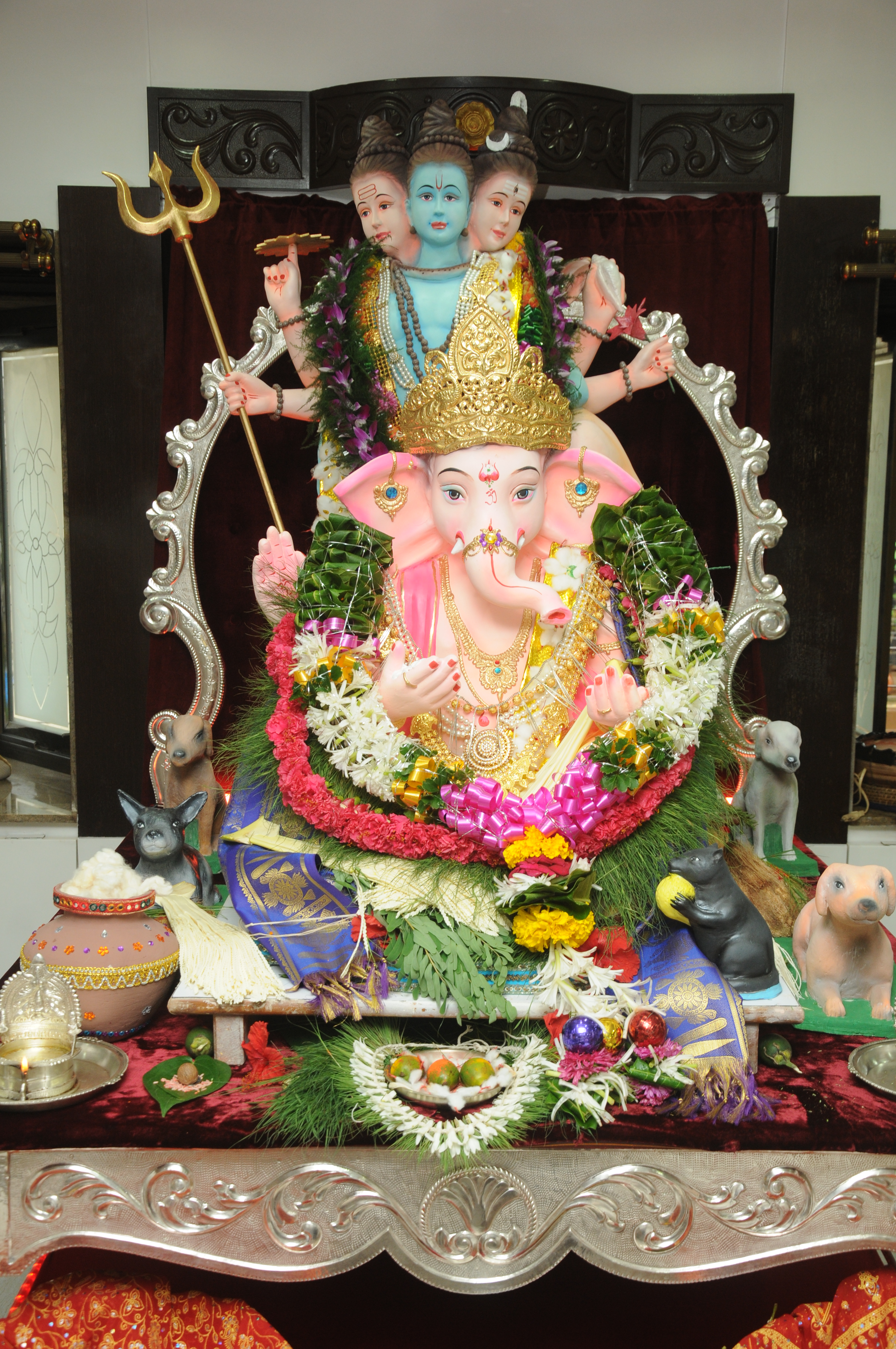
Lord Ganesha (Ganpati)

Hinduism is considered part of the four major religions in the world and has over 1.1 billion followers. Hinduism, also referred to as Sanatana Dharma, translates to the eternal law or way. It is also the oldest religion of the four major ones. Though Hinduism is present around the world, the predominant countries that practice Hinduism and would operate their businesses under this include Nepal, Mauritius and India.

Ethical business considerations derived from Hinduism have become an important part of defining people's actions. The Gita details how the ethics of Hindu teachings influence business practices and involves how Dharma, meaning duty or ethics, encourages individuals to follow callings to move higher in life and to attain this duty and is relevant in business practices and trade. Another teaching, Tat-Twam-Asi, highlights the way nature, individuals and spirits intertwine. These teachings hold businesses to consider a holistic approach to their commercial outlook.

Lord Ganesha in Hinduism is a god tasked to "remove obstacles", "patron of sciences and arts," as well as the "deva of wisdom and intelligence," as Dunn and Jensen (2019) claim. The elephant often symbolises Ganesha as the ears represent and encourage greater listening, the small mouth promotes lesser talking, the big stomach associates with one's greater ability to digest the bad, neutral and good things in life, the little eyes with attentive concentration and the trunk for high efficiency and flexibility. This becomes identifiable in business work ethics as people aim to resemble Lord Ganesha and his features.

=== Neo Hinduism ===
Neo-Hinduism has underpinned the success of businesses and consumer lifestyles through a rapid economic growth seen in India. Hinduism asserts the importance of wealth and success as a feature of an acceptable life more dominantly than other religions such as Islam, Christianity and Buddhism. Nevertheless, too much personal wealth is not expected to deliver happiness, as society should be able to benefit from this selfless and moral behaviour.

=== Buddhism ===
Buddhism was founded in 500 BCE by Prince Siddartha Gautama (Gautama Buddha) in India. It is practiced by 535 million people predominantly across most Asian countries such as India, Cambodia, Thailand, Laos, Mongolia, Sri Lanka, Myanmar and Bhutan. Buddhism focuses more on an experimental and knowledge-based system. The teachings of Buddha centralise on the Three Universal Truths, the Four Noble Truths and the Noble Eightfold Path and have the main belief of reincarnation.

Workplaces have increasingly started to integrate more spiritual principles into their culture and management systems on the basis of Buddhist ethics and influences. It has also made a growing presence in Western countries such as the US, indicative of the increasing cultural diversity that has been brought about by globalisation. Buddhism has seen values and ethics of an increase in greater personal responsibility, motivation towards greater collaboration and open-mindedness become embedded within business practices.

The Buddhist ethical concept of Karma gives people control over their choice of actions, words and thoughts. Choosing to deviate from harmful actions will allow people to avoid the potential cause of suffering in the future, synonymous with a cause-and-effect cycle. Greater personal responsibility is achieved through Karma, whereby evoking ownership over negative and positive actions and reflecting on the consequences. This ethic fosters a more integrated and less irritable or stressful behaviour within businesses that limits the way of blaming others for personal failures rather than on oneself. For example, if managers are generous towards their suppliers or have donated to charity, it is expected that there will be an eventual positive effect for the business.

Zen refers to recognising the meaning of life without being influenced by logic or language and embodies the attainment of enlightenment. The ethics surrounding Zen emulate the Buddhist ethics of precepts, compassion and monastic codes. Motivation towards healthy detachment in a business environment draws on the mindfulness of Zen to free people from suffering at work. This reduces work-related stress and anxiety as it encourages people to alter their psychological stance to become more accepting and open-minded. This is seen in the way businesses eliminate clusters that do not add value to the business through removing people, processes, or objects that would otherwise cause such stress.

Buddhism defines that two qualities must develop simultaneously and equally: compassion (karuna) and wisdom (panna). The ethical conduct of perceiving one another as filial figures enables a model of compassion and kinship, which, when applied to the workplace environment, builds encouragement and motivation towards achieving goals. This extends to how the Dalai Lama said that it is through the interconnectedness coalesced with the interdependence of people and objects that have fabricated the way the world lives. In business, this ethic infers that acknowledgement of the work by different people, such as the cleaner, employer or consumer, operates in an interconnected manner and produces the best work. This continues in the way tasks are fulfilled with respect and through teamwork to generate better outcomes and also corresponds with the Buddhist ethical behaviour.

== Japanese ethics ==
=== Buddhism ===
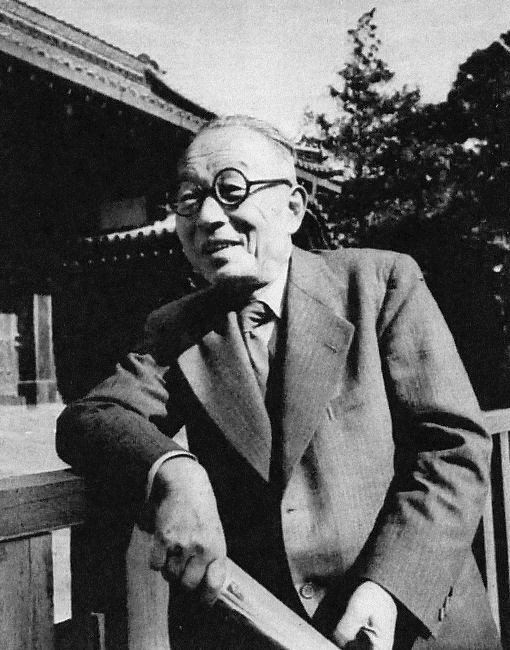
Pictured is Watsuji Tetsuro

In Japan, there is an understanding that each phenomenon has its own soul or spirit (numen) that is affiliated with other unique numens in the world. It is known that in an environment where definite norms exist, it is a "transcendental normative environment" and is supported by Buddhism (Dunfee, 1961). Work has its own numen, which Japanese people associate with a greater life force, a reflection of ethics. It is recognised that becoming an expert in a field often implies reaching a godlike (kami) stage. This is emphasised in the way Japanese employees continuously improve, through Kaizen, their products, work ethic and decisions to reach the path of universal numen.

Watsuji Tetsuro’s work on Japanese ethics considers the balanced yet dual relationship an individual has with themselves and with society. His analysis of these ethics has been obtained predominantly from Buddhist ethical standards as well as ancient Japanese cultural understandings. Tetsuro argues that trust is built within an individual (ningen sonzai) as it has already been established through existing relationships with people, which encourages them to act ethically. The idea of trust amongst business practices to maintain the relationship amongst customers is carried out through conduct such as the use of safe working conditions and quality products. Here, a person’s sense of truth is promoted through their business behaviour to act ethically and truthfully and aligns with the social matrix. Tetsuro claims that untruthful individuals in a business can create a "certain distortion" amongst "group spirit" and an openness to "communal sense" to society is needed (Tetsuro, 1935). He concludes that through the Eastern way of thinking, Japanese people believe relations should be long-term looking as it is offensive if relationships are made for short-term gains.
