= OrionVM =

Australian company

- Type: Privately held company
- Industry: Internet hosting services
- Founder: Sheng Yeo (CEO); Alex Sharp (CTO); Joseph Glanville
- Headquarters: Sydney, Australia and San Francisco, California
- Products: OrionVM Wholesale Cloud Platform
- Number of employees: 50 (estimated)
- Website: OrionVM.com

OrionVM Wholesale Pty Limited (trading as OrionVM) is an Australian infrastructure as a service provider and white-label cloud platform. Resellers present customers with a rebranded interface for deploying virtual machine instances, which are only billed for what their customers use. Cloud Harmony benchmarked the OrionVM Cloud Platform's InfiniBand-backed network storage as the world's fastest in 2011.

The company was founded and is headquartered in Sydney, Australia, with offices in San Francisco, California.

== History ==
OrionVM was founded in a dorm by Sheng Yeo, Alex Sharp and Joseph Glanville in 2010. The company's cloud platform was developed while the founders were still students at the University of Technology, Sydney and University of Sydney. After fifteen months of development, their cloud platform entered a Public Beta programme, with a full launch on 1 April 2011.

In 2011, the company received angel investments from Australian entrepreneur and PIPE Networks co-founder Stephen Baxter and American Gordon Bell of DEC and Microsoft Research.

For his work at OrionVM, CEO Sheng Yeo was nominated for the 2012 Australian Entrepreneur of the Year and the 2013 Ernst & Young Entrepreneur of the Year.

In 2014, OrionVM received a State Merit award and a National Finalist nomination in the 2014 iAwards, with CTO Alex Sharp winning the Hills YIA Cloud award. The company was nominated for a Stevie Award for New Product or Service of the Year in Cloud Infrastructure Software, and an Australian Startup Awards nomination.

In 2016, Yeo and Sharp were named in the Forbes 30 Under 30 Asia list.

== Products ==
OrionVM Wholesale Cloud Platform
- AAPT Connect's rebrand of the platform
- Original authors: Alex Sharp; Sheng Yeo; Joseph Glanville
- Developer: OrionVM
- Release: 1 April 2010; 16 years ago
- Written in: C, Python
- Operating system: Linux for hypervisor and instances, Windows Server for instances
- Platform: Xen
- Available in: English
- Type: Infrastructure as a Service
- Licence: Proprietary for platform and Windows Server instances; Open source for API, ovm_ctl and Linux instances
- Website: Official website

OrionVM sells a wholesale cloud infrastructure platform for public, private and hybrid cloud deployments. Vendors can white-label the platform for resale, or for internal use. Prominent resellers include:

- Australian telephone company AAPT
- BizCloud
- IT broker StrataCore.

== Technology ==
OrionVM uses the Xen hypervisor to virtualise multiple machines (referred to as "instances") on the same hardware. Linux instances use paravirtualisation for reduced overhead by default, with Windows Server being deployed using hardware-assisted virtualisation (HVM).

Traditional virtual private server and infrastructure as a service providers consolidate storage into a storage area network, which is limited by Ethernet network speeds and best-effort reliability. OrionVM's platform took design cues from supercomputers by placing hypervisor storage and compute on the same physical servers. These are backed by a decentralised InfiniBand fabric. This improves network reliability and performance, and allows for rapid rollover between physical hosts for high availability.

== Features ==
=== Rebranded panel ===
To end users, the base of the platform consists of a web panel, where customers are able to deploy virtual machines. For resellers, the logos and theme can be modified to suit their own branding.

=== Instances ===
From the panel, users can deploy preconfigured instances with their chosen operating system and required memory. Additional storage disks and IP addresses can be created separately, then assigned to new or existing instances. After shutting down, further resources can be allocated or scaled down.

=== Access ===
Instances can be accessed out-of-band via a web-based serial console or VNC session. Access is also available via ovm_ctl, an open source command line interface available from GitHub and the pip package manager.

Linux machines come preconfigured with SSH, and Windows with RDP for remote access.

=== Templates ===
Instances can be provisioned from a series of predefined templates, which can be customised if required. They include:

- CentOS
- Debian Linux
- FreeBSD
- Slackware Linux
- Ubuntu Server (long-term support releases)
- Microsoft Windows Server

Vyatta templates are officially supported for software-defined logical networking between instances.

=== API ===
A public API exists for controlling instances. Open source Python bindings are available on GitHub.

== See also ==
- Cloud computing
- InfiniBand
