= Ranjay Gulati =

Indian-American organizational scholar

- Education: Delhi University St. Stephen's College; Washington State University; MIT Sloan School of Management; Harvard University
- Occupation: Academic
- Employer: Harvard Business School

Ranjay Gulati is an Indian-American organizational scholar and currently the Paul R. Lawrence MBA Class of 1942 Professor of Business Administration at the Harvard Business School.

== Early life ==
Ranjay Gulati graduated from St. Stephen's College at the University of Delhi in India, where he earned a bachelor's degree in economics in 1983, and Washington State University in the United States, where he earned a second bachelor's degree in computer science in 1985. He earned a master's degree in management from the MIT Sloan School of Management in 1987, and a PhD from Harvard University in Organizational Behavior in 1993.

== Career ==
Gulati taught at Northwestern University's Kellogg School of Management from 1993 to 2008. Since 2008, he has been the Jaime and Josefina Chua Tiampo Professor of Business Administration at the Harvard Business School.

Gulati is the author of several books.

== Personal life ==
Gulati resides in Newton, Massachusetts, U.S.

== Works ==
- Books
  - Gulati, Ranjay (2007). Managing Network Resources: Alliances, Affiliations, and other Relational Assets. Oxford, U.K.: Oxford University Press. ISBN 9780199299850. OCLC 799861429.
  - Gulati, Ranjay (2009). Reorganize for Resilience: Putting Customers at the Center of Your Organization. Boston, Massachusetts: Harvard Business Press. ISBN 9781422156186. OCLC 681532425.
  - Gulati, Ranjay; Mayo, Anthony J.; Nohria, Nitin (2013). Management. Mason, Ohio: South-Western Publishing. ISBN 9781133626701. OCLC 822619101.
- Articles
  - Gulati, Ranjay; Nohria, Nitin; Wohlgezogen, Franz (March 2010). "Roaring Out of Recession". Harvard Business Review.
  - Gulati, Ranjay; DeSantola, Alicia (March 2016). "Start-Ups That Last". Harvard Business Review.
  - Gulati, Ranjay; DeSantola, Alicia (March 4, 2016). "Startups Can't Revolve Around Their Founders If They Want to Succeed". Harvard Business Review.
  - Gulati, Ranjay (September–October 2017). "GE's Global Growth Experiment". Harvard Business Review.
