= Ethical implications in contracts =

When creating a contract, a negotiator is not only doing so to reach an agreement between two or more parties, but to create an agreement that is durable; whereby parties of the contract are legally bound and committed to its promises. A legally binding contract is defined as an exchange of promises or an agreement between parties that the law will enforce, and there is an underlying presumption for commercial agreements that parties intend to be legally bound (Contracts 2007).

In order to be a legally binding contract, most contracts must contain two elements:

- All parties must agree about an offer made by one party and accepted by the other.
- Something of value must be exchanged for something else of value. This can include goods, cash, services, or a pledge to exchange these items.

In addition, certain contracts are required by state law to be in writing (real estate transactions, for example), while others are not.

Wade and Honeyman describe a ‘durable’ contract as one in which all parties substantially perform without abandonment and without resorting to legal proceedings. With only anecdotal evidence, it is difficult to know what percentages of contracts are in fact breached. It is probable that the statistics vary greatly over differing class, culture, wealth and type of transaction. The reasons for a breach of contract are also varying, and ethical issues can emerge in some situations.

Some ethical considerations which may become apparent in the durability of contracts are cultural relativism and moral relativism.

Grace and Cohen (2005) describe cultural relativism as the extent to which different societies and cultures have different values and ethical standards in the fields of business and organisational life. Those who embrace cultural relativism believe that all beliefs (religious, ethical, aesthetic, and political) are relative to the individual within a culture. Types of relativism include moral (where ethics depend on the social assembly), situational (where right or wrong is dependent on the situation), and cognitive (where truth itself has no objective standard). The legislative system is having a harder time defining laws with the diminishing set of standards, and our court system is having a harder time interpreting them.

Moral relativism views ethical standards, morality, and positions of right or wrong as being culturally based. This therefore subjects these views as being an individual's choice. While modern society was previously governed by a "Judeo-Christian" standard, this view has increasingly been acknowledged as the chief moral philosophy of modern society. (Moral Relativism – Neutral Thinking?. 2006). However, these "Judeo-Christian" standards continue to be the foundation for civil law, as most people believe that right and wrong are not absolutes, but are determined by the individual.

Following are reasons for breaches in contracts and the way in which these ethical considerations may impact upon them. In most of these situations, the law may not agree with moral or cultural relativism and award in favour of what people generally view as being ‘right’ or ‘wrong’. It is therefore imperative that contracts are created to be as durable as possible so parties are unable to find legal ‘loopholes’ and use their power, wealth, ignorance or cultural differences in setting contracts aside. Following these descriptions is a list of ways on which contracts can be made more durable.

== Cultural expectations of flexibility ==
In some cultural groups such as Japan, the creation of a contract symbolises the formation of a working relationship, and not a legally binding agreement. Some groups will regard the contract as being flexible in terms that if any problems or issues arise, the parties will reassess the obligations of the agreement and negotiate ways to preserve the relationship. However, this is not generally the ‘Western’ view on contracts.

In relation to the ethical issue of cultural relativism, a business is obliged to operate in a manner acceptable to the host country, both legally and morally. But what if the contract is not necessarily subject to having a ‘host country’? Is it morally wrong for a Western party to hold a Japanese party to the contract when it is known that the Japanese party would not have intended to be legally bound? Or is it unethical or immoral of the Japanese to sign such an agreement, even though they mean well when signing it, knowing the Western party intended to be legally bound by the contract but themselves see the contract as more of a flexible agreement?

Honeyman and Wade (2005) state that differences in cultural expectations can predictably lead to the more economically powerful party attempting to negotiate that all breaches will be dealt with ultimately by courts from their own culture, applying their own cultural and legal rules.

This then highlights the issue of different legal rules existing in different countries which enable contracts to be set aside. The list of exceptions to finality of contracts varies from one jurisdiction to another, and this is often placed under the label ‘frustration of contracts’.

== Lack of informed consent ==
Some acts cannot legally take place because of a lack of informed consent. This can occur under conditions of pressures of limited time, money, exhaustion and exhortations to settle from lawyers. Another person is generally authorised to give consent if an individual is unable to. These cases sometimes result in a party refusing to comply with the terms of the contract; however, they are rarely successful as a defense to an enforcement action. Judges usually take the view that a client advised by a lawyer is strongly presumed both to have a basic understanding of legal principle, and to have given consent (Informed Consent 2007). This was the case in Gerbert and Gerbert (1990) FLC 92–137, where a husband settled for 10% of assets against his probable entitlement to 40%, and it was held that there was no miscarriage of justice as the husband acted freely and was advised to seek legal advice. In cases where an individual is provided limited facts, serious ethical issues may arise.

Is it ethical to hold someone to a contract when they clearly had no awareness of exactly what they were signing and committing themselves to, due to ignorance or not? Is it ethical for a lawyer to encourage the signing of a document if they are clearly not fully understanding of the document?

== Wealth ==
If the chance of success and money is opportune to a wealthy person, their capacity and willingness can give rise to alleging various legal justifications for breach. A few years of legal expenses may only be a small proportion of their empire, and the resulting attrition and disparate investment in the conflict may eventually encourage other parties to renegotiate the disputed clauses.

In terms of moral relativism, most people would agree that it is ethically wrong to use wealth to control a situation and to ‘force’ people into renegotiating clauses in contracts if they are unable to afford the legal bill accompanying a dispute. However, as moral relativism is subject to a one's own beliefs on what is right and wrong, some may not view using wealth as a means to control as being the wrong thing to do. In situations such as these, the ‘little man’ usually loses out and will ultimately succumb to the power of the other party or parties.

== Undue influence ==
Undue influence is an equitable doctrine that involves one person taking advantage of a position of power over another. The law presumes that in certain classes of relationship there will be a special risk of one party unduly influencing their conduct and motives for contracting (Undue Influence 2007). Because the court can vitiate such a contract if there is a special relationship, when no special relationship exists, the general rule is whether there was a relationship of such trust and confidence that it should give rise to such a presumption.

An example of such a case is Odorizzi v. Bloomfield School District CA Ct of App 54 Ca Rpt 533 [1964]. The plaintiff was under contract as a teacher. He was arrested, and the next day he allegedly was pressured by his superiors to sign and deliver his resignation. He was cleared of the criminal charges, and then he sought to be reinstated by the school district. They refused, so he sued to rescind his resignation. He claimed that his resignation should not be enforced because, among other things, he signed it under the "undue influence" of his superiors.

When a party has placed their confidence and trust in another and this relationship is broken, the view of moral relativism will generally see this situation as being wrong. Undue influence is usually an act of dishonesty and/or deceit in a situation where one party realizes their power over the other and takes advantage of this. Deception and deceit are not viewed as being ethical values inherent in a person.

== Increasing the durability of contracts ==
As Honeyman and Wade point out, to increase the chances of ‘performance’ of a contract (and therefore reduce chances of a breach), a party should enhance:

- Entering into contracts with parties where there is already a longstanding relationship – therefore raising incentives to perform promises
- Avoiding making contracts with cultural groups that view contracts as the ‘beginning of a relationship’, rather than a legally binding agreement
- Clarifying whether ‘yes’ means ‘maybe’ or ‘no’ and whether signed and detailed contracts are considered to be binding, morally, legally and/or in reputation, or just amount to the declaration that a working relationship now exists
- Including clauses and a discussion regarding how any future misunderstandings and problems will be addressed
- Attempting to agree that final determination of any future problems with performance will be in a court or arbitration venue
- Only going into contract with parties that are stable and reliable
- Taking out risk management insurance for non-performance or currency fluctuations
- Attempting to enter into an agreement which recognizes procedural, emotional and substantive needs of all parties involved
- Not walking close to the line on any of the legal rules such as duress, deceit, vague terminology or illegality and this will give other parties the opportunity to claim a loophole
- Attempting to reduce buyer's remorse by
  - Making congratulatory speeches about the agreement's benefits
  - Never agreeing quickly to any clauses
  - Adding post-agreement gifts and bonuses
  - Publicize the deal by mutual agreement. A wider audience will then place expectations on all parties to perform, or risk losing face and credibility in future arrangements. Most people have a strong desire to act consistently with their own clear commitment.
