= Nikos Mourkogiannis =

- Νίκος Μουρκογιάννης
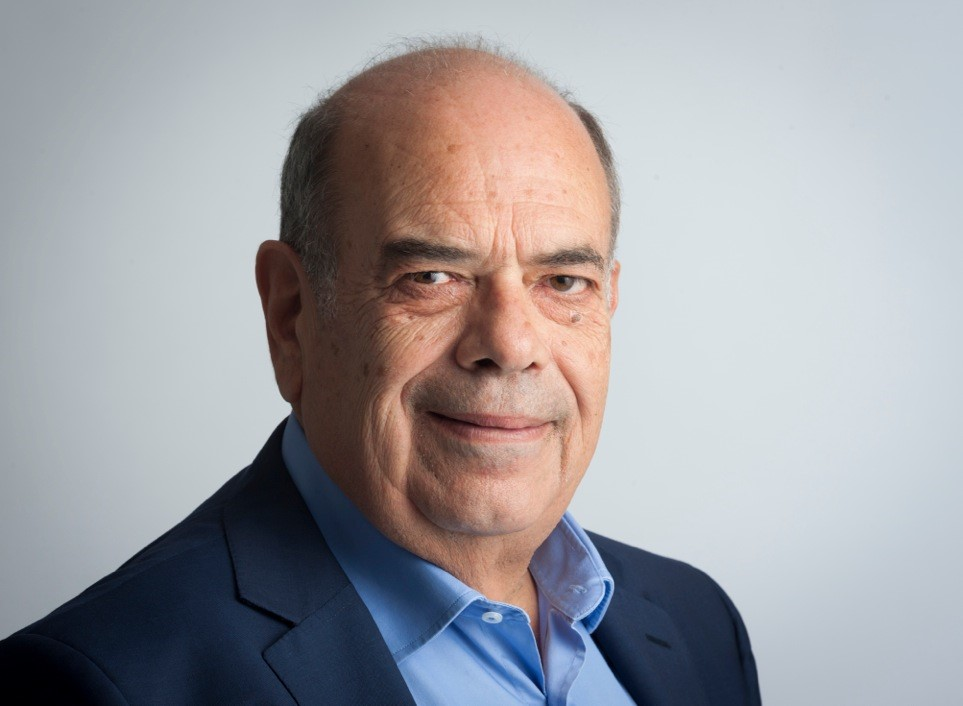
- Nikos Mourkogiannis in 2017
- Born: March 9, 1952 (age 74); Mytilene, Greece
- Occupations: Business consultant, lawyer, author
- Notable work: Purpose: The Starting Point of Great Companies
- Website: nikos.com

Nikos Mourkogiannis (Greek: Νίκος Μουρκογιάννης, born March 9, 1952) is a Greek business consultant, lawyer and writer. He is member of the board of the Stelios Philanthropic Foundation and Honorary Visiting Professor of Practice at Cass Business School.

He is known as the author of the book "Purpose: The Starting Point of Great Companies", which is taught in universities and is considered an important asset for all businesses. It is a book about leadership and business strategy, in which there is a full analysis of the four primary business purposes: Discovery, Helping, Achievement, and Heroism.

During his presidency of the Greek National Opera (GNO), he embarked on a restructuring program and the reorganization of GNO's financial situation, thereby saving the organization's operation and leading to its continuous progress.

== Early life and education ==
Nikos Mourkogiannis was born in Greece in 1952. After graduating as a valedictorian from the Varvakeio Experimental Gymnasium in 1969, he received an LL.B. (summa cum laude) from the Law School of the National and Kapodistrian University of Athens in 1974.

He pursued PhD studies in Political Economy and Government at the John F. Kennedy School of Government at Harvard University in 1978 and obtained his MBA degree from Harvard Business School in 1993.

== Career ==
In 1976 he helped establish the field of Negotiations at Harvard University with Professor Roger Fisher (academic), author of Getting to Yes. Nikos Mourkogiannis developed the curriculum of the first course on negotiations taught at Harvard University, "Cooping with Conflict", which he taught for 5 years. He was a co-founder of the Harvard Negotiation Project and conducted seminars about settling several international conflicts, including that of the Middle East. He made important contributions to the work on the Camp David Accords.

In 1981 Nikos Mourkogiannis joined Westinghouse Electric Corporation, reporting to the President of Europe, Africa and Middle East until 1983, when he moved to General Dynamics where he became the only non-engineer Director of F16 Programs.

In 1992 he joined Monitor Company Group LP, now Monitor Deloitte, where he became chairman and CEO for Europe, Africa and Middle East. During his tenure the number of Monitor's consultants employed in the region quadrupled.

In 2005 he moved to Booz Allen Hamilton as Senior Advisor on Strategic Leadership, and he also founded and became Chairman of PantheaLeadership Advisors, in which Booz Allen Hamilton was a shareholder.

In 2010 he came back to Greece, after receiving an invitation by the former Minister of Culture and Tourism, to undertake the presidency of the Board of the Greek National Opera, aiming to reorganize its financial situation which threatened the organization's operation.

In 2011 he became Director of Strategic Restructuring at Roland Berger, and in 2012 he was elected member of the board of the European Union Agency for Network and Information Security (ENISA). From 2013 till 2014, he advised the European Commissioner for Digital Agenda, Neelie Kroes, on cypersecurity.

Since 2016, Nikos Mourkogiannis is Trustee & Member of the Board of the Stelios Philanthropic Foundation.

== Authorship career ==
Nikos Mourkogiannis belongs to the school of Teleology, according to which, concepts, in the four fields he studies and writes about (Law, Economics, Political Science, Management), can be understood only in connection with what Aristotle called "Telos", which in English is translated as "Purpose".

Nikos Mourkogiannis has been featured in many academic journals of leadership. His book entitled 'Purpose: The Starting Point of Great Companies', was endorsed by 32 presidents and CEOs of many global organizations such as Deutsche Börse, the Maersk Oil, the Campbell's, Braun and Whole Foods. He has also received positive reviews from prestigious publications such as: The New York Times, The Financial Times and The Times.

Nikos Mourkogiannis's work has been praised by several business and thought leaders such as Jacob Rothschild, Josef Ackermann, Rosabeth Moss Kanter and Jeffrey Sonnenfeld.

He has authored several articles in publications such as Strategy+Business magazine, Leader to Leader, The Conference Board Review, Leadership Excellence and Ivey Business Journal. Nikos Mourkogiannis has been invited to write for the Harvard Business Review Online and the Business Week Online.

- Nikos Mourkogiannis (2006), Purpose: The starting Point of Great Companies, Paperback

== Personal life ==
Nikos Mourkogiannis was married to Janet Sherbow, a professional photographer, from 1983 until her death in 2013. His only daughter, Ceci Mourkogiannis, is co-founder and CEO of Papero Inc., a San Francisco-based media company.

== Conscious Capitalism Movement ==
Based on the book "Purpose: The Starting Point of Great Companies" by Nikos Mourkogiannis, John Mackay ( John Mackey (businessman) ) has founded the Conscious Capitalism movement, as he states in his speeches and personal blog. Companies and people refer to the concept of Conscious Capitalism and choose to pursue a sustainable business strategy for both humans and the environment.

The Conscious Capitalism has its principles in 4 parts; the Higher Purpose, the Stakeholder Orientation, the Conscious Leadership and the Conscious Culture.
