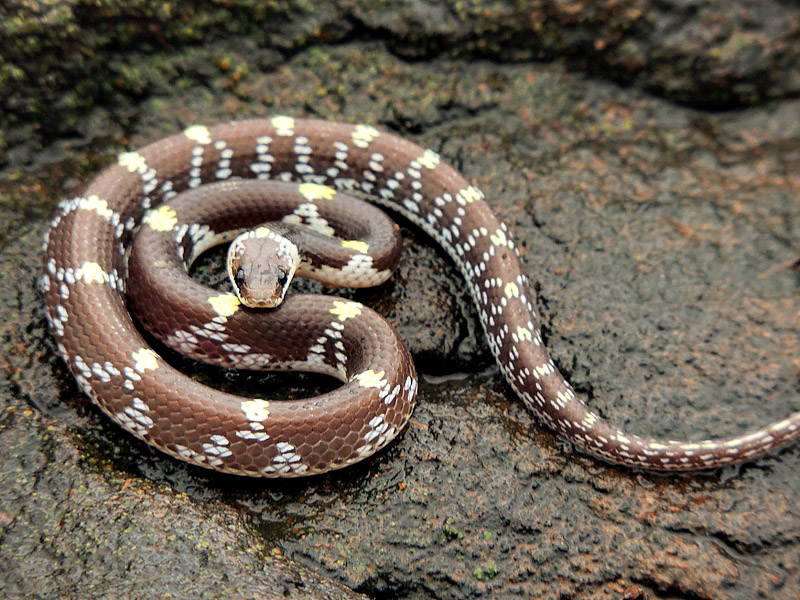
- Lycodon striatus from Maharashtra

Conservation status
- Least Concern (IUCN 3.1)

Scientific classification
- Kingdom: Animalia
- Phylum: Chordata
- Class: Reptilia
- Order: Squamata
- Suborder: Serpentes
- Family: Colubridae
- Genus: Lycodon
- Species: L. striatus

Binomial name
- Lycodon striatus (Shaw, 1802)

Synonyms
- Coluber striatus Shaw, 1802

= Lycodon striatus =

Species of snake

Lycodon striatus, commonly known as the northern wolf snake or the barred wolf snake, is a species of nonvenomous colubrid snake from southern Asia.

== Geographical range ==
Lycodon striatus is found in Afghanistan, India (Andhra Pradesh, Tamil Nadu, Gujarat, Karnataka, Madhya Pradesh, Maharashtra, Punjab and Uttar Pradesh), eastern and north-eastern Iran, Nepal, Pakistan, Sri Lanka, western Tajikistan, southern Turkmenistan (Kopet Dagh) and Uzbekistan.

== Description ==
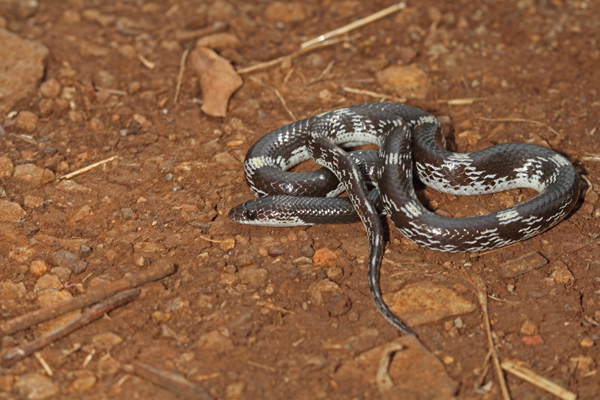
Lycodon striatus

Lycodon striatus is dark brown or black above, with white transverse spots or crossbands, which are widely separated anteriorly. The sides are lineolated with white, with a black spot corresponding to each white crossband. The upper lip and ventrum are uniform white (coloration in alcohol). The longest adult known to George Albert Boulenger in 1893 was 43 centimetres (17 in) in total length, with a tail 7.5 cm (3.0 in) long.

The head is only slightly distinct from the neck, and the snout is flattened. There are 8 upper labials, the first and second contacting the nasal scale.

== Taxonomy ==
Lycodon striatus was first described in 1802 by George Shaw, as Coluber striatus; its type locality was "Vizagapatam and Hyderabad". Two subspecies are recognised, including the nominate race:

- Lycodon striatus sinhaleyus Deraniyagala, 1955
- Lycodon striatus striatus (Shaw, 1802)

== Ecology ==
Lycodon striatus prefers dry regions such as semideserts and forest edges. Snakes of this species are nocturnal. By day they hide under stones, but after dark they emerge to hunt. Lycodon striatus feeds on skinks, geckos and other small lizards.

== Reproduction ==
Adult females lay eggs in April (in India). Clutch size is small, at only 2–4 eggs, and the egg size is relatively large – 25–30 millimetres (1.0–1.2 in) long by 9–12 mm (0.35–0.47 in) wide. Parental care of the eggs has been observed.
