= Oracle VM Server for x86 =

Server virtualization offering by Oracle Corporation

- Developer: Oracle Corporation
- Stable release: 3.4.6.3 / 3 June 2020; 5 years ago
- Written in: C
- Operating system: Linux kernel
- Platform: IA-32, x86-64
- Type: Platform virtualization
- License: Server: GNU GPL; Manager: Proprietary (redistributable freeware)
- Website: www.oracle.com/us/technologies/virtualization/oraclevm/overview/index.html

Oracle VM Server for x86 is a server virtualization offering from Oracle Corporation. Oracle VM Server for x86 incorporates the free and open-source Xen hypervisor technology, supports Windows, Linux, and Solaris guests and includes an integrated Web based management console. Oracle VM Server for x86 features fully tested and certified Oracle Applications stack in an enterprise virtualization environment.

Oracle VM Server for x86 can be freely downloaded through Oracle Software Delivery Cloud. Oracle announced the general availability of Oracle VM 3.4.6 at 30 November 2018.

Oracle VM Server for x86 entered sustaining support on July 1, 2024, and is not receiving new patches or updates. It has been replaced by Oracle Linux Virtualization Manager, which is based on KVM and OVirt.

== Components ==
- Oracle VM Manager: web based management console to manage Oracle VM Servers.
- Oracle VM Server: includes a version of Xen hypervisor technology, and the Oracle VM Agent to communicate with Oracle VM Manager for management of virtual machines. It also includes a minimized Linux kernel as Dom0.

== Resource limits ==
As of version 3.4.6, Oracle VM Server for x86 can take advantage of up to 384 CPUs (Tested) / 2048 CPUs (Designed), 6TB RAM per server and can host a maximum of 300 VM per server.
VCPUs per VM: 256 (PVM) / 128 (HVM, PVHVM) VMs per server, 1 TB RAM

== End of life ==
Oracle VM Server for x86 is now in sustaining support, and will not receive patches or security fixes. It has been replaced by Oracle Linux Virtualization Manager.

== See also ==
- Docker
- Kernel-based Virtual Machine
- libvirt
- Oracle VM Server for SPARC
