= Richard P. Nielsen =

Richard P. Nielsen is an American educator who is the Professor of Management and Organization at Boston College's Carroll School of Management and a past President of the Society for Business Ethics.

== Biography ==
Nielsen was born in 1946 in New York City. He has bachelor's and master's degrees from the Wharton School of the University of Pennsylvania and a Ph.D. from Syracuse University.

He has served as President, Program Chair, and Executive Board Member of the Society for Business Ethics. He has also served as Senior Editor for Organization Studies (journal), and is currently serving on the Editorial Boards of Business Ethics Quarterly, Business and Professional Ethics Journal, Journal of Academic Ethics, and Sustainability Accounting, Management and Policy Journal.

== Selected publications ==
- Nielsen, Richard P. The politics of ethics: Methods for acting, learning, and sometimes fighting with others in addressing ethics problems in organizational life. Oxford University Press, (1996).
- Nielsen, Richard P. "Cooperative strategy." Strategic Management Journal, (1988): 475-492.
- Nielsen, Richard P. "Changing unethical organizational behavior." Academy of Management Perspectives, (1989): 123-130.
- Nielsen, Richard P. and Jean M. Bartunek. "Opening narrow, routinized schemata to ethical stakeholder consciousness and action." Business & Society, (1996): 483-519.
- Nielsen, Richard P. "Corruption networks and implications for ethical corruption reform." Journal of Business Ethics, (2003): 125-149.
- Nielsen, Richard P. and Christi Lockwood. "Varieties of transformational solutions to institutional ethics logic conflicts." Journal of Business Ethics, (2018): 45-55.
- Nielsen, Richard P. and Simona Giorgi. "Social situational business ethics framing for engaging with ethics issues." Business and Professional Ethics Journal, (2020): 1-42.
