= Professional Ethics (journal) =

- Discipline: Ethics, philosophy
- Language: English
- Edited by: Robert Baum

Publication details
- History: 1992-2003
- Publisher: Center for Applied Ethics, University of Florida (United States)
- Frequency: Quarterly

Standard abbreviations
- ISO 4: Prof. Ethics

Indexing
- ISSN: 1063-6579 (print); 2154-3658 (web)
- LCCN: 93-660008
- OCLC no.: 26103927

Links
- Journal homepage; Online access

Professional Ethics: A Multidisciplinary Journal was a peer-reviewed academic journal that examined ethical issues in the context of the practice of a profession. Established in 1992, the journal published original research on ethics issues in accounting, business, engineering, sports, the military, and other fields. Notable contributors include Carol G. Gould, R. M. Hare, and Daryl Koehn. The journal published special issues in cooperation with professional organizations in several countries, including the Australian Association for Professional and Applied Ethics, Canadian Society for the Study of Practical Ethics, International Association for the Philosophy of Sport, International Colloquium on Military Obedience, Maguire Center for Ethics and Public Responsibility, and the Markkula Center for Applied Ethics. Professional Ethics was published at the Center for Applied Ethics at the University of Florida until 2003. Members of the Society for Ethics Across the Curriculum have online access to all issues of this journal as a benefit of membership.

== Abstracting and indexing ==
Professional Ethics has been indexed by MEDLINE, The Philosopher's Index, Philosophy Research Index, PhilPapers, and Scopus.

== Mergers ==
In 2004, Professional Ethics was merged with the Business and Professional Ethics Journal. The combined journal is published by the Philosophy Documentation Center, in cooperation with the Institute for Business and Professional Ethics at DePaul University.

== See also ==
- List of philosophy journals
