= Journal of Business Ethics Education =

- Discipline: Business ethics, Education, Philosophy
- Language: English
- Edited by: John Hooker

Publication details
- History: 2004-present
- Publisher: NeilsonJournals Publishing
- Frequency: Annual

Standard abbreviations
- ISO 4: J. Bus. Ethics Educ.

Indexing
- ISSN: 1649-5195 (print); 2041-6962 (web)
- OCLC no.: 60386769

Links
- Journal homepage; Tables of content, 2004-present

The Journal of Business Ethics Education is a peer-reviewed academic journal that examines the particular challenges facing business ethics educators. It publishes articles, case studies, and reviews intended to help instructors do a better job in the classroom. Established in 2004, the journal is edited by John Hooker at Carnegie Mellon University, and published by NeilsonJournals Publishing in print and electronic formats. The journal is also available online from the Philosophy Documentation Center.

== Notable contributors ==
- Norman E. Bowie
- Joanne B. Ciulla
- William C. Frederick
- Richard T. De George
- Joseph DesJardins
- Georges Enderle
- Edwin M. Hartmann
- Lori V. Ryan

== See also ==
- List of philosophy journals
