= Norman E. Bowie =

American academic (born 1942)

Norman E. Bowie is an American philosopher and business ethicist, known for his work in corporate responsibility and the application of Kantian ethics to business. He is professor emeritus at the University of Minnesota, where he held the Elmer L. Andersen Chair in Corporate Responsibility.

He is an important voice in ongoing debates over business ethics, in which his own voice has been in favor of the Kantian view of ethics (in business as elsewhere) as a Kingdom of Ends.

== Education ==
Bowie earned his AB in philosophy from Bates College in 1964 and his PhD in philosophy from the University of Rochester in 1968.

== Academic career ==
In 1972 Bowie accepted the position of executive director of the American Philosophical Association (APA) and the APA then at the University of Maryland moved to Hamilton College.

Bowie moved to the University of Delaware when the American Philosophical Association moved its permanent headquarters there in 1975. Later at Delaware he created the Center for the Study of Values which was best known for its conferences that applied philosophical insight to contemporary value conflicts. Several of these conference proceedings resulted in books.

Bowie held a joint appointment in the Department of Strategic Management and the Department of Philosophy at the University of Minnesota. He has also served as Dixons Professor of Business Ethics and Social Responsibility at the London Business School and was a fellow at Harvard University's Program on Ethics and the Professions.

He is a past president of the Society for Business Ethics and the American Society for Value Inquiry, and a former executive director of the American Philosophical Association.

Bowie has served on the editorial boards of Business Ethics Quarterly and Business and Professional Ethics Journal and is a senior contributing editor for the Journal of Business Ethics Education.

Bowie has taught business ethics in the Minnesota Carlson Executive MBA program, regular MBA courses, and the joint MBA program with the Warsaw School of Economics. In 2003, he launched an international business ethics course that includes a study trip to Europe.

In 2009, Bowie received the first Lifetime Achievement Award in Scholarship presented by the Society for Business Ethics.

== Research and contributions ==
Bowie is recognized for his pioneering work on Kantian ethics in business. His work on Kantian Business Ethics was the subject of a festschrift Kantian Business Ethics: Critical Perspectives that included criticism of his work and his response. He also co-edited Ethical Theory and Business with Tom Beauchamp, which has reached its ninth edition.

His areas of expertise include corporate responsibility, ethics, leadership, morality of markets, and sustainability. Bowie has emphasized integrating philosophical ethics into practical business decision-making.

== List of books ==
- 1971 Towards A New Theory of Distributive Justice, University of Massachusetts Press Translated into Spanish, 1972.
- 1977 Ethical Theory and Business, Co-editor with Tom L Beauchamp, Prentice- Hall Second Edition, 1983 .Third Edition, 1988 Translated into Japanese. Fourth Edition, 1993. Fifth Edition, 1997. Sixth Edition 2001. Seventh Edition 2003. Eighth Edition 2008 with Denis Arnold as a third editor, Ninth Edition 2013 Tenth Edition 2020 with Beauchamp and Bowie as advisory coeditors and Cambridge University Press as publisher . An eleventh edition with Arnold as the sole editor is in press.
- 1981 Ethical Issues in Government, Editor, Temple University Press
- 1982 Ethics, Public Policy, and Criminal Justice, Co-editor with Frederick Elliston, Oelgeschlager, Gunn & Hain Publishers
- 1988 Equal Opportunity, Editor, Westview Press
- 1990 Business Ethics, Prentice Hall. Second Edition, Co-author with Ronald Duska, A selection has been reprinted as "Criteria for Government Regulations" Ethical Issues in Business, Michael Boylan, Editor, Harcourt Brace, 1995, pp. 434–439. First Edition single authored 1982
- 1992 Ethics and Agency Theory, Co-editor with R. Edward Freeman, Oxford University Press
- 1994 University-Business Partnerships: An Assessment, Rowman and Littlefield. An article based on Chapter 5, "The Clash Between Academic Values and Business Values," appeared in Business & Professional Ethics Journal, Vol. XII, 1993, pp. 3–19
- 1999 Business Ethics A Kantian Perspective, Blackwell Publishers: Also published in Chinese by the Shanghai Academy of Social Sciences. Also published in Japanese by Koyoshobo Publishers 2008.
- 2002 Guide to Business Ethics, Editor Blackwell Publishers
- 2005 Ethical Marketing with Patrick E. Murphy, Gene R. Lazniak, and Thomas A Klein Pearson Prentice Hall, also in initial Prentice Hall SafariX Series. Translated into Chinese, Peking University Press.
- 2005 Management Ethics with contributions from Patricia H. Werhane. Blackwell Publishers, to be translated into Chinese and published by Economic Management Publishing House. To be translated into Japanese. Publisher Koyo Shobo
- 2011 Business Ethics for Dummies with Meg Schneider. Wiley
- 2012 Kantian Business Ethics: Critical Perspectives Denis G Arnold and Jared D Harris. Edward Elgar Publishing Chapter 11 Norman E Bowie “A Reply to My Critics” pp175–189
- 2013 Business Ethics in the 21st Century. Springer Books
- 2017 Business Ethics: A Kantian Perspective Second Edition. Cambridge University Press
