= Lukas Meyer =

German philosopher, academic

Lukas H. Meyer
- Born: August 22, 1964 (age 62); Germany
- Occupations: Philosopher, academic and author

Academic background
- Education: M.A., philosophy Diploma Political Science; D.Phil; Habilitation
- Alma mater: Uhland-Gymnasium Tübingen; Washington University in St. Louis; Freie Universität Berlin; University of Oxford; University of Bremen
- Thesis: Extending Liberal Political Philosophy: International and Intergenerational Relations(Doctoral Thesis)(1996); Historische Gerechtigkeit (Habilitation)(2003)

Lukas H. Meyer is a German philosopher, academic and author. He is a university professor as well as speaker of the working section Moral and Political Philosophy (in German "Praktische Philosophie") at the University of Graz.

Meyer is most known for his works on practical philosophy, primarily focusing on legal philosophy, political philosophy, ethics and social philosophy. Among his authored works are his publications in academic journals, including Politics, Philosophy & Economics, Global Environmental Change and Nature Climate Change as well as books such as Rights, Culture, and the Law: Themes from the Legal and Political Philosophy of Joseph Raz and Rectifying Historical Injustice Debating the Supersession Thesis.

Meyer co-founded the journal Moral Philosophy and Politics (de Gruyter) and has served as its editor in chief since January 2024. He serves as the associate editor of the journal Law, Ethics and Philosophy.

== Education ==
Following his graduation from Uhland-Gymnasium Tübingen, Meyer pursued studies in philosophy, political science, history, and international law at Tübingen and Yale. In 1987, he obtained a Master of Arts in Philosophy from Washington University in St. Louis, followed by a diploma in political science from the Freie Universität Berlin in 1990. Moreover, in 1996, he received his doctorate from the University of Oxford. Furthermore, focusing on the topic of "Historical Justice", he completed his habilitation in 2003 at the University of Bremen.

== Career ==
Meyer began his academic journey in 1990 as a research assistant at Freie Universität Berlin, where he served until 1995. Subsequently, he assumed the role of a research assistant at the University of Bremen. In the period from 2000 to 2002, he held positions at the Australian National University, at Harvard University and at Columbia University. Between 2004 and 2005, he became a lecturer in practical philosophy and political theory at the University of Keele. Following this, he held an appointment as an assistant professor of practical philosophy at the University of Bern. Since 2009, he has served as the speaker of the working section Moral and Political Philosophy and has held the position of university professor of philosophy at the University of Graz.

Upon joining the University of Graz in 2009, Meyer held various positions, including serving as the head of the Department of Philosophy from 2009 to 2013 and 2017 to 2019, vice-head of the department since 2021, vice-dean of the Faculty of Humanities from 2011 to 2013, head of the Center for Cultural Studies from 2011 to 2013, dean of the Faculty of Humanities from 2013 to 2017, and speaker of the Field of Excellence Climate Change Graz since 2019.

Meyer serves as the vice chairman of the Climate Change Center Austria.

== Research ==
Meyer, in his research, has focused on intergenerational justice, historical justice and ethics of climate change. In a book chapter that he authored in the book Rights, Culture and the Law, he defended a liberal cosmopolitan stance, asserting equal moral status for all people across time, rejecting the relevance of unique relations to future generations for attributing moral rights to them, and prioritizing a forward-looking perspective on history with a focus on the well-being of present and future individuals. His 2006 study argued for a global cap on greenhouse gas emissions and proposed a distribution of emission rights based on prioritarian principles, contending that people in developing countries should be granted higher emission rights than those in industrialized countries, rejecting the justification of above-average current emissions based on above-average past emissions. In addition, his book and encyclopedic article, both titled Intergenerational Justice, investigated the philosophical aspects of intergenerational relations, exploring questions about the status of deceased and future individuals, potential harm across time periods, and the duties of justice, with practical implications for policy areas like reparations for historical injustices and responses to climate change.

In his collaborative work with Karl Steininger and others, Meyer advocated transitioning from production-based to consumption-based climate policies for industrialized nations, asserting potential gains in global cost-effectiveness and justice through factors like clean technology transfer and redirecting import tax revenues to developing economies. Furthermore, he analyzed the interplay between expectations, emissions, and justice, emphasizing the importance of considering various legitimate expectations in addressing climate change. While contributing to the book titled Climate Change 2014: Mitigation of Climate Change, he examined climate change from a human perspective, addressing ethics and economics, investigating the notion of dangerous interference with the climate system, and delving into justice and value considerations to offer decision-makers a holistic grasp of societal responses. Additionally, in collaboration with Christian Lininiger and others, his 2015 study explored the challenges in allocating global greenhouse gas reductions within the UN framework, highlighting discrepancies in national carbon accounting systems and advocating for reliable global data to ensure consistent calculation of multiple carbon accounts for effective climate policies. Furthermore, his collaborative work with Keith Williges and others proposed an approach to the allocation of the global carbon budget among countries for mitigating climate change, emphasizing fairness considerations such as securing basic needs, attributing historical responsibility, accounting for past emission benefits, and incorporating a qualified version of the equal-per-capita approach with limited grandfathering. Moreover, in a book that he co-edited with Pranay Sanklecha, he explored the ethical dimensions of climate change, advocating for prioritized emission rights for the developing world based on historical injustice and proposing a shift in framing financial contributions for climate change adaptation as measures rooted in global distributive justice.

While contributing to the book Loss and Damage from Climate Change, Meyer authored a book chapter, wherein he explored climate change-induced Loss and Damage, highlighting key elements such as risk management efficacy, attribution science, adaptation limits, climate insurance, and the imperative of inclusive narratives in policy discussions. He led the Doctoral Programme Climate Change (DKCC), Uncertainties, Thresholds and Coping Strategies from 2014 to 2022. His edited work titled Rectifying Historical Injustice Debating the Supersession Thesis, examined and challenged Jeremy Waldron's "supersession thesis", exploring its conceptual foundations and applications in addressing historical injustices, with a focus on real-world cases such as indigenous rights, linguistic injustice, and climate change. Moreover, he also holds the distinction of being among the first philosophers to serve as lead author for an assessment status report issued by the Intergovernmental Panel on Climate Change.

== Awards and honors ==
- 2001–02 – Feodor Lynen Research Fellow of the Alexander von Humboldt-Foundation, Columbia University in New York City
- 2004 – Honorary Research Fellow, Research Institute for Philosophy
- 2021– – Affiliated Professor, Scuola Superiore di Studi Universitari e di Perfezionamento Sant'Anna

== Bibliography ==
=== Books ===
- Neukantianismus und Rechtsphilosophie (2002) ISBN 978-3-7890-8197-2
- Rights, Culture, and the Law: Themes from the Legal and Political Philosophy of Joseph Raz (2003) ISBN 978-0-19-924825-4
- Justice in Time: Responding to Historical Injustice (2004) ISBN 3-8329-0503-4
- Historische Gerechtigkeit (2005) ISBN 978-3-11-018330-6
- Intergenerational Justice (2009) ISBN 978-0-19-928295-1
- Justice, Legitimacy, and Public International Law (2009) ISBN 978-0-511-69172-0
- Democracy, Equality, and Justice (2011) ISBN 978-1-138-87483-1
- Rectifying Historical Injustice Debating the Supersession Thesis (2023) ISBN 978-1-032-30182-2

=== Selected articles ===
- Meyer, L. (2003). Past and future: the case for a threshold notion of harm. Rights, culture, and the law: Themes from the legal and political philosophy of Joseph Raz, 143–159.
- Meyer, L. (2003). Obligations persistantes et réparation symbolique. : Revue Philosophique de Louvain. 101 (1), 105 – 122.
- Meyer, L. H., & Roser, D. (2006). Distributive justice and climate change. The allocation of emission rights. Analyse & Kritik, 28(2), 223–249.
- Meyer, L. 2013. Why Historical Emissions Should Count. Chicago Journal of International Law, 13, 598–614.
- Steininger, K., Lininger, C., Droege, S., Roser, D., Tomlinson, L., & Meyer, L. (2014). Justice and cost effectiveness of consumption-based versus production-based approaches in the case of unilateral climate policies. Global Environmental Change, 24, 75–87.
- Steininger, K. W., Lininger, C., Meyer, L. H., Muñoz, P., & Schinko, T. (2016). Multiple carbon accounting to support just and effective climate policies. Nature Climate Change, 6(1), 35–41.
- Mechler, R., Calliari, E., Bouwer, L. M., Schinko, T., Surminski, S., Linnerooth-Bayer, J., ... & Zommers, Z. (2019). Science for loss and damage. Findings and propositions. Loss and damage from climate change: Concepts, methods and policy options, 3–37.
- Meyer, L. H., & Zalta, E. N. (Eds.). (2021). Intergenerational Justice. The Stanford Encyclopedia of Philosophy.
- Williges, K., Meyer, L. H., Steininger, K. W., & Kirchengast, G. (2022). Fairness critically conditions the carbon budget allocation across countries. Global Environmental Change, 74, 102481.
