= Ciulla =

Ciulla is a surname. Notable people with the surname include:

- Anthony Ciulla, later Tony Capra (c. 1943–2003), American criminal
- Joanne B. Ciulla (born 1952), American philosopher
