= Stakeholder (corporate) =

Member of groups without whose support the organization would cease to exist

In a corporation, a stakeholder is a member of "groups without whose support the organization would cease to exist", as defined in the first usage of the word in a 1963 internal memorandum at the Stanford Research Institute. The theory was later developed and championed by R. Edward Freeman in the 1980s. Since then it has gained wide acceptance in business practice and in theorizing relating to strategic management, corporate governance, business purpose and corporate social responsibility (CSR). The definition of corporate responsibilities through a classification of stakeholders to consider has been criticized as creating a false dichotomy between the "shareholder model" and the "stakeholder model", or a false analogy of the obligations towards shareholders and other interested parties.

== Types ==
Any action taken by any organization or any group might affect those people who are linked with them in the private sector. For examples these are parents, children, customers, owners, employees, associates, partners, contractors, and suppliers, people that are related or located nearby. Broadly speaking there are three types of stakeholders:

- Primary stakeholders are usually internal stakeholders, are those that engage in economic transactions with the business (for example stockholders, customers, suppliers, creditors, and employees).
- Secondary stakeholders are usually external stakeholders, although they do not engage in direct economic exchange with the business – are affected by or can affect its actions (for example the general public, communities, activist groups, business support groups, and the media).
- Excluded stakeholders are those such as children or the disinterested public, originally as they had no economic impact on business. Now as the concept takes an anthropocentric perspective, while some groups like the general public may be recognized as stakeholders others remain excluded. Such a perspective does not give plants, animals or even geology a voice as stakeholders, but only an instrumental value in relation to human groups or individuals.

A narrow mapping of a company's stakeholders might identify the following stakeholders:

- Employees
- Communities
- Shareholders
- Creditors
- Investors
- Government
- Customers
- Owners
- Financiers
- Managers

A broader mapping of a company's stakeholders may also include:

- Suppliers
- Distributors
- Labor unions
- Government regulatory agencies
- Government legislative bodies
- Government tax-collecting agencies
- Industry trade groups
- Professional associations
- NGOs and other advocacy groups
- Prospective employees
- Prospective customers
- Local communities
- National communities
- Public at Large (Global Community)
- Competitors
- Schools
- Future generations
- Analysts and Media
- Research centers

== In corporate responsibility ==
In the field of corporate governance and corporate responsibility, a debate is ongoing about whether the firm or company should be managed primarily for stakeholders, stockholders (shareholders), customers, or others. Proponents in favor of stakeholders may base their arguments on the following four key assertions:

1. Value can best be created by trying to maximize joint outcomes. For example, according to this thinking, programs that satisfy both employees' needs and stockholders' wants are doubly valuable because they address two legitimate sets of stakeholders at the same time. There is evidence that the combined effects of such a policy are not only additive but even multiplicative. For instance, by simultaneously addressing customer wishes in addition to employee and stockholder interests, both of the latter two groups also benefit from increased sales.
2. Supporters also take issue with the preeminent role given to stockholders by many business thinkers, especially in the past. The argument is that debt holders, employees, and suppliers also make contributions and thus also take risks in creating a successful firm.
3. These normative arguments would matter little if stockholders (shareholders) had complete control in guiding the firm. However, many believe that due to certain kinds of board of directors structures, top managers like CEOs are mostly in control of the firm.
4. The greatest value of a company is its image and brand. By attempting to fulfill the needs and wants of many different people ranging from the local population and customers to their own employees and owners, companies can prevent damage to their image and brand, prevent losing large amounts of sales and disgruntled customers, and prevent costly legal expenses. While the stakeholder view has an increased cost, many firms have decided that the concept improves their image, increases sales, reduces the risks of liability for corporate negligence, and makes them less likely to be targeted by pressure groups, campaigning groups and NGOs.

A corporate stakeholder can affect or be affected by the actions of a business as a whole. Whereas shareholders are often the party with the most direct and obvious interest at stake in business decisions, they are one of various subsets of stakeholders, as customers and employees also have stakes in the outcome. In the most developed sense of stakeholders in terms of real corporate responsibility, the bearers of externalities are included in stakeholdership.

== In management ==
In the last decades of the 20th century, the word "stakeholder" became more commonly used to mean a person or organization that has a legitimate interest in a project or entity. In discussing the decision-making process for institutions—including large business corporations, government agencies, and non-profit organizations—the concept has been broadened to include everyone with an interest (or "stake") in what the entity does. This includes not only vendors, employees, and customers, but even members of a community where its offices or factory may affect the local economy or environment. In this context, a "stakeholder" includes not only the directors or trustees on its governing board (who are stakeholders in the traditional sense of the word) but also all persons who paid into the figurative stake and the persons to whom it may be "paid out" (in the sense of a "payoff" in game theory, meaning the outcome of the transaction). Therefore, in order to effectively engage with a community of stakeholders, the organisation's management needs to be aware of the stakeholders, understand their wants and expectations, understand their attitude (supportive, neutral or opposed), and be able to prioritize the members of the overall community to focus the organisation's scarce resources on the most significant stakeholders.

Example

- For example, in the case of a professional landlord undertaking the refurbishment of some rented housing that is occupied while the work is being carried out, key stakeholders would be the residents, neighbors (for whom the work is a nuisance), and the tenancy-management team and housing-maintenance team employed by the landlord. Other stakeholders would be funders and the design-and-construction team.

The holders of each separate kind of interest in the entity's affairs are called a constituency, so there may be a constituency of stockholders, a constituency of adjoining property owners, a constituency of banks the entity owes money to, and so on. In that usage, "constituent" is a synonym for "stakeholder".

== Stakeholder theory ==
Post, Preston, Sachs (2002), use the following definition of the term "stakeholder": "A person, group or organization that has interest or concern in an organization. Stakeholders can affect or be affected by the organization's actions, objectives and policies. Some examples of key stakeholders are creditors, directors, employees, government (and its agencies), owners (shareholders), suppliers, unions, and the community from which the business draws its resources.

Not all stakeholders are equal. A company's customers are entitled to fair trading practices but they are not entitled to the same consideration as the company's employees. The stakeholders in a corporation are the individuals and constituencies that contribute, either voluntarily or involuntarily, to its wealth-creating capacity and activities, and that are therefore its potential beneficiaries and/or risk bearers." This definition differs from the older definition of the term stakeholder in Stakeholder theory (Freeman, 1983) that also includes competitors as stakeholders of a corporation. Robert Allen Phillips provides a moral foundation for stakeholder theory in Stakeholder Theory and Organizational Ethics. There he defends a "principle of stakeholder fairness" based on the work of John Rawls, as well as a distinction between normative and derivative legitimate stakeholders. Real stakeholders, labelled stakeholders: genuine stakeholders with a legitimate stake, the loyal partners who strive for mutual benefits. Stake owners own and deserve a stake in the firm. Stakeholder reciprocity could be an innovative criterion in the corporate governance debate as to who should be accorded representation on the board. Corporate social responsibility should imply a corporate stakeholder responsibility.

== Examples of a company's stakeholders ==
Stakeholders:	Stakeholder's concerns:
Government	taxation, VAT, legislation, employment, truthful reporting, legalities, externalities...
Employees	rates of pay, job security, compensation, respect, truthful communication, appreciation, acknowledgement, recognition.
Customers	value, quality, customer care, ethical products.
Suppliers	providers of products and services used in the end product for the customer, equitable business opportunities.
Creditors	credit score, new contracts, liquidity.
Community	jobs, involvement, environmental protection, shares, truthful communication.
Trade unions	quality, worker protection, jobs.
Owner(s)	profitability, longevity, market share, market standing, succession planning, raising capital, growth, social goals.
Investors	return on investment, income.

== See also ==
- Stakeholder engagement
- Stakeholder theory
- Stakeholder (law)
- UK company law
- Strategy Markup Language, whose core elements include <Stakeholder>
- Multistakeholder Governance Model
