= List of ethics journals =

This is a list of peer-reviewed, academic journals in the field of ethics.

Note: there are many important academic magazines that are not true peer-reviewed journals. They are not listed here.

== A ==
- American Journal of Bioethics

== B ==
- Bioethics
- BMC Medical Ethics
- Business and Professional Ethics Journal
- Business Ethics: A European Review
- Business Ethics Quarterly

== C ==
- Canadian Journal of Bioethics
- Christian Bioethics: Non-Eucumenical Studies in Medical Ethics
- Clinical Ethics

== E ==
- Environmental Ethics
- Environmental Values
- Ethical Theory and Moral Practice
- Ethics
- Ethics and Information Technology
- Ethics in Progress
- Ethics & International Affairs
- Ethics & Politics [Etica & Politica]*
- Ethics, Policy & Environment (formerly Ethics, Place & Environment)

== H ==
- Hastings Center Report

== I ==
- International Journal of Applied Philosophy
- International Journal of Feminist Approaches to Bioethics

== J ==
- Journal of Academic Ethics
- Journal of Agricultural and Environmental Ethics
- Journal of Animal Ethics
- Journal of Applied Philosophy
- Journal of Business Ethics
- The Journal of Ethics
- Journal of Empirical Research on Human Research Ethics
- Journal of Jewish Ethics
- Journal of Law, Medicine & Ethics
- Journal of Medical Ethics
- Journal of Military Ethics
- Journal of Moral Philosophy
- Journal of Political Philosophy
- Journal of Social Philosophy
- Journal of the Society of Christian Ethics
- Journal of Value Inquiry

== K ==
- Kennedy Institute of Ethics Journal

== M ==
- Moral Philosophy and Politics

== N ==
- The National Catholic Bioethics Quarterly
- The New Bioethics
- Neuroethics

== P ==
- Philosophical Psychology
- Philosophy & Public Affairs
- Philosophy of the Social Sciences
- Politics, Philosophy & Economics

== R ==
- Radical Philosophy
- Relations. Beyond Anthropocentrism

== S ==
- Science and Engineering Ethics

== T ==
- Teaching Ethics

== See also ==
- List of philosophy journals
