= Lori Verstegen Ryan =

Lori Verstegen Ryan is professor of management at San Diego State University. She is the director of SDSU's Corporate Governance Institute. She is on the editorial boards of Business & Society and Business Ethics Quarterly and previously served on the editorial board of Academy of Management Review and as associate editor for corporate governance of Business & Society. Ryan is a Fellow of the International Association for Business and Society, having served as conference chair (2005) and president (2006-2007).
