= Denis Collins (business ethicist) =

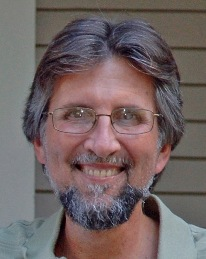
- Born: Denis Collins; January 12, 1956 (age 70); Bronx, New York
- Died: February 25, 2021
- Citizenship: American
- Education: University of Pittsburgh
- Known for: Optimal Ethics System Model
- Scientific career
- Fields: Business ethics Leadership; Service learning Social responsibility Participatory management
- Workplaces: Edgewood College; University of Bridgeport; University of Wisconsin–Madison

Denis Collins (born January 12, 1956) was an American business ethicist and tenured professor of business at Edgewood College in Madison, Wisconsin.

== Biography ==
Denis Collins was born in the Bronx and raised in Carlstadt, New Jersey. He received a B.S. in business administration from Montclair State University in 1977, an M.A. in philosophy from Bowling Green State University in 1987, and a PhD in business environment and public policy from the University of Pittsburgh in 1990. He specialized in business ethics, teaching it at the University of Wisconsin–Madison, the University of Bridgeport, and Edgewood College.

He is a terminal cancer survivor, husband and father.

== Optimal Ethics System Model ==
Collins' Optimal Ethics System Model is a compilation of what he says are best practices for achieving a morally healthy organization (preventing unethical or illegal behavior). They typically take the form of step-by-step instructions, like recipes. Collins offers empirical evidence that sustained financial success requires implementation of this model.

The Optimal Ethics System Model offers best practices in five categories:

1. Hiring practices
  1. Procedures for recruiting individuals who demonstrate and sustain ethical behavior over time
2. Orientation practices
  1. Procedures for orienting new employees to a code of ethics and conduct
  2. Procedures for orienting new employees to an ethical decision-making framework
3. Training practices
  1. Procedures for teaching ethics
4. Operating practices
  1. Procedures for nurturing respect for employee and customer diversity
  2. Systems for reporting ethical misbehavior
  3. Procedures for ethical leadership and management (rewarding ethical behavior)
  4. Procedures for engaging and empowering employees to achieve superior performance
  5. Procedures for managing interaction with the natural environment
  6. Procedures for conducting meaningful community outreach
5. Evaluation practices
  1. Procedures for continually improving best practices

== Books ==
Collins has authored or edited articles and essays on business ethics, social responsibility, participatory management, and service learning; he has also authored, co-authored, and co-edited several books:

- Business Ethics: How to Design and Manage Ethical Organizations
- Essentials of Business Ethics: Creating an Organization of High Integrity and Superior Performance
- Behaving Badly: Ethical Lessons from Enron
- Gainsharing and Power: Lessons from Six Scanlon Plans
- Sustaining the Natural Environment: Empirical Studies on the Interface Between Nature and Organizations
- Ethical Dilemmas in Business

== Board service ==
- Encyclopedia of Business Ethics and Society, 2004–2007
- Journal of Business Ethics, 2003–
- Journal of Academic Ethics, 2002–
- Organization & Environment, 1996–1999
- International Association for Business and Society, 1995
- Social Issues in Management Division, Academy of Management, 1995–1998

== Awards ==
- 2011 Samuel Mazzuchelli Medallion for cultivating intellectual and spiritual resources to empower others, Edgewood College
- 2010 MBA Outstanding Faculty Award, Edgewood College
- 2009 Estervig-Beaubien Outstanding Professor Award, Edgewood College
- Three times voted the outstanding MBA faculty member at the University of Wisconsin–Madison in BusinessWeek's survey of alumni
- Finalist for the Academy of Management Distinguished Educator Award
