= Michalos =

Michalos is a surname. Notable people with the surname include:

- Alex Michalos (born 1935), Canadian political scientist
- Nikos Michalos (born 1977), Greek basketball player
- Takis Michalos (1947–2010), Greek water polo player
