= Richard Clyde Taylor =

American philosopher

- Born: November 5, 1919; Charlotte, Michigan, U.S.
- Died: October 30, 2003 (aged 83); Trumansburg, New York, U.S.

Education
- Education: Brown University (PhD)
- Doctoral advisor: Roderick Chisholm

Philosophical work
- Era: 20th-century philosophy
- Region: Western philosophy
- School: Analytic philosophy
- Institutions: Brown University, Columbia University, University of Rochester
- Doctoral students: Norman Bowie, Myles Brand, Keith Lehrer, Peter van Inwagen
- Main interests: Metaphysics; Virtue ethics Arthur Schopenhauer

Richard Clyde Taylor (November 5, 1919 – October 30, 2003) was an American philosopher renowned for his contributions to metaphysics and virtue ethics. He was also an internationally known beekeeper.

== Biography ==
Richard C. Taylor was born in Charlotte, Michigan on November 5, 1919 and earned his B.A. at the University of Illinois in 1941. In an interview with the philosopher Timothy Madigan, he laments that he never undertook philosophical studies as an undergraduate and that his mother's pastor suggested he might become a fine preacher. Consequently, he undertook studies in religion at the University of Chicago, where he was exposed to philosophers such as Plato for the first time and developed a disdain for the Christian religion. After Japan's attack on Pearl Harbor, he enlisted in the Navy and pursued studies at the Postgraduate School of the Naval Academy at Annapolis. During World War II, he served as a commissioned submarine officer in a squadron located in the Pacific near the Philippines and filled the time during lonely watches by continuing to read philosophical texts including George Santayana’s Realms of Being. He subsequently earned his M.A. from Oberlin College in 1947. In 1951, he received his PhD at Brown University, where his supervisor was Roderick Chisholm.

Over the course of his academic career, Taylor served as the William H. P. Faunce Professor of Philosophy at Brown University (1953-1963), a Professor of Philosophy (Graduate Faculty) at Columbia University (1963-1966) and a Professor of Philosophy at the University of Rochester (1965-1985). He served as Chairman of the Department of Philosophy at the University of Rochester from 1966 until 1969. In addition, he assumed visiting appointments at about a dozen other institutions including: Cornell University, Hamilton College, Hartwick, Ohio State, Princeton University, Union and Wells College.

Early in his career, Taylor also published works utilizing the nom de plume Diodorus Cronus in honor of the obscure ancient Greek philosopher of the same name.

== Academic work ==
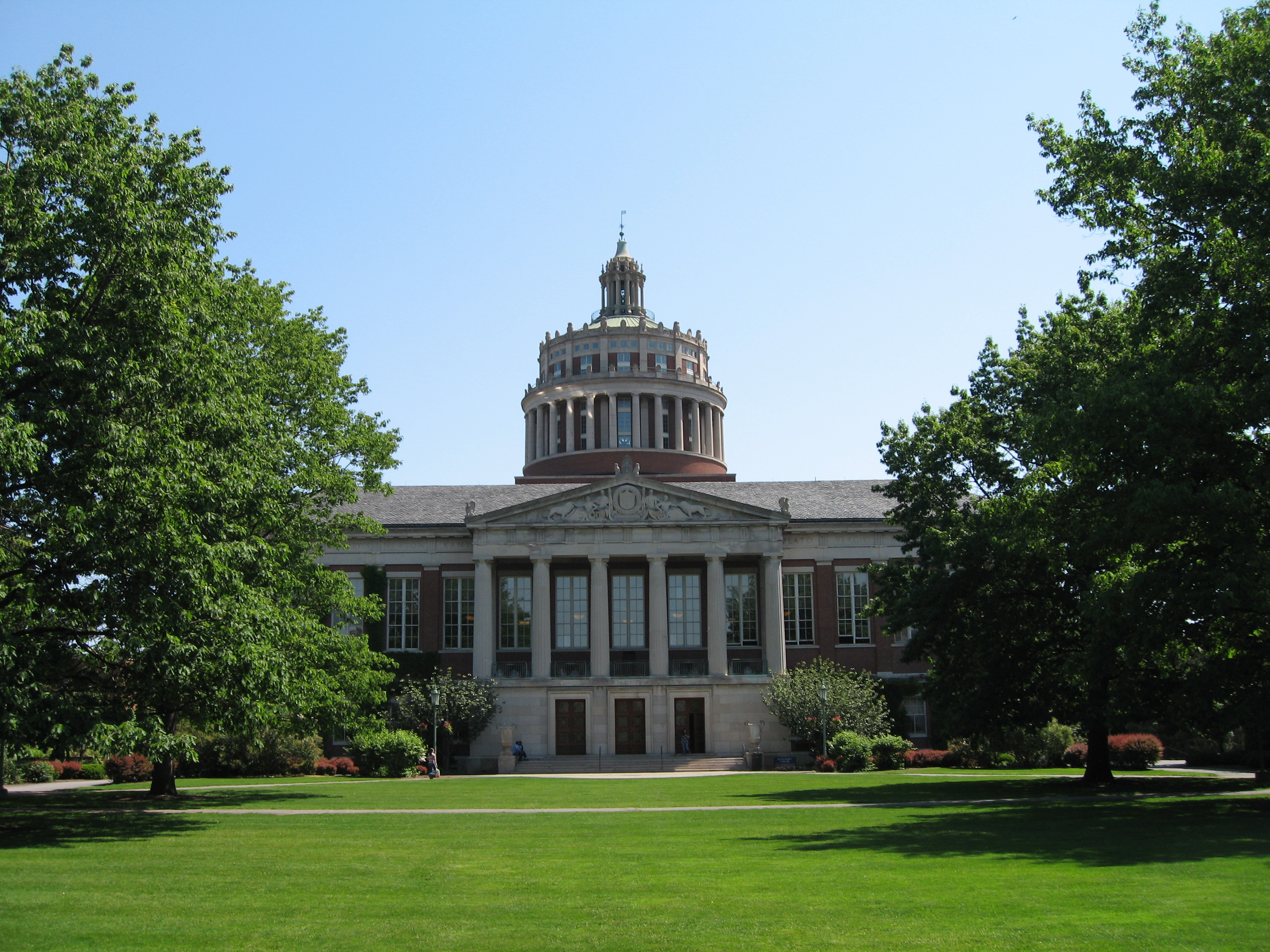
The Rush Rhees Library at University of Rochester, as seen from the Eastman Quadrangle.

It has been observed that Taylor can be described as an Analytic philosopher due to his research into such topics as: time, causality, as well as action and purpose. However, his views on the limitations of "serious philosophy" and "philosophie perennis" distinguished him from many traditional analytic philosophers of his time. He was also influenced by the works of Johann Gottlieb Fichte, Curt John Ducasse, Arthur Schopenhauer and Roderick Chisholm. His research interests included the study of metaphysics as well as the philosophy of religion.

In general terms Taylor argued that the ultimate objective of modern philosophical inquiry should not be the accumulation of a body of philosophical knowledge within a particular school of thought, which he characterized as being unattainable. Instead, he advocated a return to the ancient view that the study of philosophy is best described as the love of wisdom. and that "there simply is no such thing as philosophical knowledge, nor any philosophical way of knowing anything."

Defying conventional academic expectations, Taylor readily embraced the works of such ancient philosophers such as Thales, Epicurus, Plato and Aristotle while also admiring the more pessimistic contributions of Arthur Schopenhauer. He remained disdainful of the works of Immanuel Kant, however, and was equally dismissive of the "foolishness" which sometimes characterized organized religious practice in general. Nevertheless, he was careful not to characterize himself as a secular humanist.

It has been observed that in Taylor's view, the German idealists who followed Immanuel Kant were needlessly preoccupied with the formulation of an intricate system of intellectual moral philosophy which is based upon objective rules and a conceptualization of what it means to be dutiful. Following Schopenhauer's lead, Taylor objected to utilizing rationalism as the ultimate basis for any philosophical insight into the human condition. Like Schopenhauer, Taylor argued instead, that mankind's natural "will" or "striving" to achieve is far more fundamental than "rationality" per se. With this in mind, he argued against the emphasis placed by some modern philosophers on egalitarianism and pointed to the use of "compassion" as a source of moral value. In addition, he argued in favor of transcending a mundane existence through the pursuit of creative individual excellence and the realization of a virtuous life as envisioned by the philosophers of ancient Greece. As Taylor readily admitted, this qualified him as something akin to a philosophical "elitist". Yet he was also quick to remind his students of his conviction that the meaning of life is "not to do, but simply to be."

Paradoxically, Taylor was also quick to describe himself as a humanist who simultaneously embraced a belief in God as derived from his consciousness of the profound mysteries of life in the natural world. As a result, he argued against the exclusive use of a "cold intellect" and urged his readers to embrace the presence of a universal, timeless and loving deity. In his Action and Purpose (1966) he cautioned against the proclivity of modern man to eagerly embrace a dogmatic form of determinism within the paradigm of "scientific explaination" by observing,

"It seems to me naive to suppose that men today have suddenly ceased being arbitrary and dogmatic in the general conceptions which they have embraced, or to suppose that contemporary general conceptions are somehow more obviously correct than those of past ages."

Echoing a fundamental theme found in many of the world's religious traditions, he concluded in his With Heart and Mind (1973) that, "Nature, God, and the self, which is both an illusion and the only thing there is, never begin, never cease." In this sense, he has also been described as an idiosyncratic Theist who does not necessarily support a particular organized religious practice per se, but who espouses a belief in a divine presence within the natural order. Consequently, his views are analogous to those espoused by Socrates, Baruch Spinoza, William James and to a lesser extent J. S. Mill.

In the realm of social philososphy, Taylor's views on the presence of mankind's "natural right" to life and property were equally emphatic. He cautioned against a dogmatic devotion or blind assertion for the presence of such rights by asserting that their ultimate foundation is purely utilitarian in nature.

Always unpretentious, however, Taylor did not exempt his own philosophical output from harsh criticism and even humorously described some of it as being of "little account". As his colleague at the University of Rochester Robert L. Holmes observed, later in his academic career Taylor reexamined his philosophical thoughts once again and subsequently embraced pacifism despite having served as a commissioned officer on a submarine during World War II. Above all else, he enjoyed dialectic exchanges with his students, as well as the practice of Socratic whimsy in his lectures. His students at the University of Rochester often delighted in his custom of disavowing all pretense by conducting his lectures casually clad in khakis, a rugged pair of work boots and a flannel shirt while accompanied by Polly (his trusty Dalmatian), a warm thermos of hot tea and a kind hearted twinkle in his eye.

Over the years, Taylor was a frequent contributor to the Free Inquiry magazine. He was also inducted into the International Academy of Humanism. In 1993, he debated William Lane Craig over the subject 'Is The Basis For Morality Natural or Supernatural?'.

Taylor's best-known book was Metaphysics (1963). Other works included Action and Purpose (1966), Good and Evil (1970) and Virtue Ethics (1991). Taylor was also the editor of The Will to Live: Selected Writings of Arthur Schopenhauer. He was an enthusiastic advocate of virtue ethics. He also wrote influential papers on the meaning of life, which, like Albert Camus, he explored through an examination of the myth of Sisyphus.

Taylor's 1962 essay "Fatalism" was the subject of David Foster Wallace's undergraduate thesis at Amherst College, published in 2011 together with Taylor's essay and contemporary responses under the title Fate, Time, and Language: An Essay on Free Will.

Notable philosophers who studied under Taylor as graduate students include Norman Bowie, Myles Brand, Keith Lehrer, and Peter van Inwagen.

== Apiarist ==
- You may read Ricahrd Taylor's Joys of Beekeeping (1974); Here on Openlibrary.org

In addition to his achievements within the academic realm, Taylor was a devoted apiarist and also made significant contributions to the art of beekeeping. He once quipped humorously that,

"I suspect I’ll be remembered for my writings on honeybees longer than for my philosophy. It is something I began as a kid and it was a lifelong obsession. While philosophy tended to carry me off into the realms of nothingness, my association with beekeepers kept my feet firmly planted in reality."

Taylor owned three hundred hives of bees and, from 1970, produced mostly comb honey. He explained his management techniques in several books, including The Comb Honey Book and The Joys of Beekeeping. He has been cited for promoting a naturalistic approach to harvesting honey which incorporates the use of patience and keen observations of the behavior of bees in a hive without resorting to an invasive or forced mechanized extraction of honey. In keeping with his philosophical convictions, his honey stand was located in front of his country home on Cayuga Lake and was operated strictly on the honor system, which Taylor encouraged through the use of gentle and kind solicitations posted on its walls.

== Death ==
Taylor died at the age of 83 on October 30, 2003, in his home in Trumansburg, New York due to complications ensuing from lung cancer.

== Publications ==
Included among Richard Taylors publications are the following texts:

- You may read works by Richard Taylor including: "Good and Evil: A New Direction" (1970) "The Will to Live: Selected Writings by Arthur Schopenhauer" (1963); Here on Archive.org

- You may read Richard Taylor's "Metaphysics" (1963) online Here at hathitrust.org

- You may read Richard Taylor's "Dare to be Wise" (1968) online Here on JSTOR.org

- The Will to Live: Selected Writings of Arthur Schopenhauer. Ed. Richard Tayler.(1962)
- Metaphysics by Richard Taylor (1963)
- On the Basis of Morality by Arthur Schopenhauer, Richard Taylor, E. F. J. Payne (1965)
- "Time, Truth and Ability". Analysis, Steven Cahn coauthor (1965) 137-141
- Freedom and Determinism. Ed. Richard Taylor (1966)
- Action and Purpose by Richard Taylor (1966)
- "Dare to be Wise". The Review of Metaphysics (1968) 615-629
- Good and Evil: A New Direction by Richard Taylor (1970)
- Freedom, Anarchy, and the Law: An Introduction to Political Philosophy by Richard Taylor (1973)
- With Heart and Mind by Richard Taylor (1973)
- On the Fourfold Root of the Principle of Sufficient Reason. Arthur Schopenhauer. Introduction by Richard Taylor (1974)
- The New Comb Honey Book by Richard Taylor (1981)
- Ethics, Faith and Reason by Richard Taylor (1985)
- Reflective Wisdom. by Richard Taylor (1989)
- Virtue Ethics An Introduction by Richard Taylor (1991)
- Restoring Pride: The Lost Virtue of Our Age (1996) by Richard Taylor

== See also ==
- American philosophy
- List of American philosophers
