= Business and Professional Ethics Journal =

- Discipline: Business ethics, philosophy
- Language: English
- Edited by: Daryl Koehn, Bas van der Linden

Publication details
- History: 1981–present
- Publisher: Philosophy Documentation Center (United States)
- Frequency: Quarterly

Standard abbreviations
- ISO 4: Bus. Prof. Ethics J.

Indexing
- ISSN: 0277-2027 (print); 2153-7828 (web)
- LCCN: 85-641765
- JSTOR: busiprofeethijou
- OCLC no.: 7520096

Links
- Journal homepage; Online access; Special issues

Business and Professional Ethics Journal is a peer-reviewed academic journal that examines ethical issues in business encountered by professionals working in large organizational structures. It provides an outlet for original work that contributes to the development of alternative theories and practices within business and professional ethics, and that examines why global ethical issues, such as poverty alleviation and sustainability, emerge and persist. The journal is published by the Philosophy Documentation Center in cooperation with the Institute for Business and Professional Ethics at DePaul University. Members of the Society for Ethics Across the Curriculum have online access to this journal as a benefit of membership.

== Abstracting and indexing ==
Business and Professional Ethics Journal is abstracted and indexed by ABI/INFORM, Academic ASAP, Business Periodicals Index, Business Source Premier, Emerging Sources Citation Index, ERIH PLUS, MEDLINE, PAIS International, Periodicals Index Online, Philosopher's Index, PhilPapers, ProQuest Research Library, Public Affairs Index, Scopus, Social Sciences Abstracts, TOC Premier, Wilson Business Abstracts, and Wilson OmniFile.

== History ==
The journal was established in 1981 by Robert Baum, Norman E. Bowie, and Deborah Johnson. The journal has published special issues in cooperation with professional organizations in several countries, including The Academy of Business in Society (EABIS), Australian Association for Professional and Applied Ethics, Canadian Society for the Study of Practical Ethics, the Markkula Center for Applied Ethics, Middlesex University Business School, and the Society for Business Ethics. In 2004 the Business and Professional Ethics Journal merged with Professional Ethics. The editors-in-chief are Daryl Koehn (DePaul University) and Bas van der Linden (Radboud University Nijmegen).

== See also ==
- List of ethics journals
- List of philosophy journals
