= Robert Allen Phillips =

American academic (born 1968)

Robert A. Phillips
- Born: April 18, 1968 (age 58); Asheville, North Carolina, U.S.
- Education: Appalachian State University; University of South Carolina; Darden School of the University of Virginia
- Scientific career
- Fields: Business administration, business ethics

Robert Phillips (born April 18, 1968) is the Ruffin Professor of Business Ethics at Darden Graduate School of Business Administration University of Virginia. He was previously George R. Gardiner Professor in Business Ethics and Professor of Strategic Management and Public Policy at the Schulich School of Business, York University. In 2016–17, he was the Gourlay Visiting Professor of Ethics in Business. He has also taught at the University of Richmond, Cheung Kong Graduate School of Business (Shanghai, China), the University of San Diego, the Wharton School at the University of Pennsylvania, and the McDonough School of Business at Georgetown University.

Phillips was born in Asheville, North Carolina, and received a B.S. from Appalachian State University, an M.B.A. from the University of South Carolina, and a Ph.D. from Darden Graduate School of Business Administration at the University of Virginia in 1997. He is known for his work on stakeholder theory and organizational ethics. His published work includes four books (including Stakeholder Theory and Organizational Ethics and The Cambridge Handbook of Stakeholder Theory) and dozens of scholarly articles, several of which have been reprinted around the world in multiple languages. He is a senior fellow at the Olsson Center for Applied Ethics and section editor at Journal of Business Ethics. He was formerly associate editor of Business & Society, Representative-at-Large at the Strategic Management Society, and is past president of the Society for Business Ethics.
