= Journal of Empirical Research on Human Research Ethics =

- Discipline: Ethics
- Language: English
- Edited by: Joan E. Sieber

Publication details
- History: 2006-present
- Publisher: SAGE Publications
- Frequency: 5/year
- Impact factor: 0.953 (2017)

Standard abbreviations
- ISO 4: J. Empir. Res. Hum. Res. Ethics

Indexing
- ISSN: 1556-2646 (print); 1556-2654 (web)
- LCCN: 2005214869
- OCLC no.: 60545004

Links
- Journal homepage; Online access; Online archive

The Journal of Empirical Research on Human Research Ethics is a peer-reviewed academic journal that publishes empirical research on topics in human research ethics. The first editor-in-chief was Joan E. Sieber (California State University, East Bay) and the current editor-in-chief is Douglas R Wassenaar (University of KwaZulu-Natal). It was established in 2006 and is published by SAGE Publications.

== Abstracting and indexing ==
The journal is abstracted and indexed in:

- MEDLINE/PubMed
- PsycINFO
- Social Sciences Citation Index
- Science Citation Index

According to the Journal Citation Reports, its 2017 impact factor is 0.953, ranking it 12th out of 16 journals in the category "Medical Ethics".

== See also ==
- List of ethics journals
