= Jeffrey Moriarty =

American philosopher

- Awards: Louis O. Kelso Fellowship

Education
- Education: Rutgers University (PhD), Princeton University (BA)

Philosophical work
- Era: 21st-century philosophy
- Region: Western philosophy
- School: analytic philosophy
- Institutions: Bentley University
- Main interests: business ethics
- Website: https://sites.google.com/site/jeffreymoriarty1/

Jeffrey Moriarty is an American philosopher and Professor of Philosophy and Executive Director of the Hoffman Center for Business Ethics at Bentley University. He is a former president of the Society for Business Ethics and is known for his works on business ethics. Moriarty is a recipient of the Louis O. Kelso Fellowship.

== Books ==
- Business Ethics: A Contemporary Introduction. New York, NY: Routledge 2021
