= Business Ethics: A European Review =

Academic journal

- Discipline: Business Ethics
- Language: English
- Edited by: Dima Jamali

Publication details
- History: 1992-present
- Publisher: John Wiley & Sons
- Frequency: Quarterly
- Impact factor: 2.919 (2018)

Standard abbreviations
- ISO 4: Bus. Ethics: Eur. Rev.

Indexing
- CODEN: BUETFV
- ISSN: 0962-8770 (print); 1467-8608 (web)
- LCCN: 93641302
- OCLC no.: 535480842

Links
- Journal homepage; Online access; Online archive

Business Ethics: A European Review is a quarterly peer-reviewed academic journal published by John Wiley & Sons covering business ethics. The editor-in-chief is Dima Jamali (American University of Beirut). Occasionally, the journal publishes special issues on particular interdisciplinary themes. In 2020, the journal has been renamed as Business Ethics, the Environment and Responsibility (BEER).

== Abstracting and indexing ==
The journal is abstracted and indexed in the Social Sciences Citation Index, ProQuest, EBSCO databases, and POIESIS: Philosophy Online Serials. According to the Journal Citation Reports, it has a 2018 impact factor of 2.919, ranking it 57th out of 147 journals in the category "Business" and 3rd out of 54 journals in the category "Ethics".

== See also ==
- List of ethics journals
