= Ethics in Progress =

- Discipline: Ethics, moral philosophy, philosophy.
- Language: English
- Edited by: Ewa Nowak

Publication details
- History: 2010–present
- Publisher: Adam Mickiewicz University in Poznań, Faculty of Philosophy (Poland)
- Frequency: Biannual
- Open access: Yes
- License: CC BY-SA

Standard abbreviations
- ISO 4: Ethics Prog.

Indexing
- ISSN: 2084-9257

Links
- Journal homepage; Online archive

Ethics in Progress a Polish open access peer-reviewed academic journal devoted to ethics and philosophy, published electronically, mainly in English.

The journal is devoted to ethical issues, especially empirical research of ethical problems, experimental ethics, moral competence.

The founder of the journal is Professor Ewa Nowak, Ph.D., head of the Department of Ethics at the Faculty of Philosophy of Adam Mickiewicz University in Poznań.

Ethics in Progress has been published since 2010. It publishes primarily texts in English, but also in Polish, German and Italian. Scientific articles published in the journal are reviewed in a double-blind system and subjected to anti-plagiarism control.

The journal has implemented COPE (Committee on Publication Ethics) publishing standards, uses digital identifiers for electronic documents (DOI, Digital Object Identifier) and incorporates unique identifiers of researchers (ORCID numbers) into its activities.

The journal was on the ministerial list of scored journals, with a score of 7 for 2016, 2017, 2018. In 2019, 2020 and 2021, the journal is on the ministerial list of scored journals, with a score of 40.

The journal is indexed in SCOPUS, listed on Directory of Open Access Journals, and on SHERPA/RoMEO journal policy database. Articles from this journal are available in the Google Scholar service.

In 2023 Ethics in Progress has advanced to 34 percentile in Scopus CiteScore Ranking in Philosophy, placing it in 3rd quartile of philosophy journals listed on Scopus.

The editorial team consists of Ewa Nowak, Tomasz Raburski, Georg Lind(until +2021), Jason Matzke, Roma Kriauciuniene, Roberto Franzini Tibaldeo, Joanna Dutka, Alicja Skrzypczak, Marcin Jan Byczyński, Sara Sgarlata and Noemi Sgarlata.

== See also ==
- List of ethics journals
- List of philosophy journals
