= Thomas Donaldson (ethicist) =

Thomas Donaldson is The Mark O. Winkelman Professor of Legal Studies & Business Ethics at the Wharton School at the University of Pennsylvania. He is an expert in the areas of business ethics, corporate compliance, corporate governance, and leadership. He is Associate Editor for the Business Ethics Quarterly (2015-). He is a supporter of stakeholder theory in relation to business management, arguing in 1995 that "the most prominent alternative to the stakeholder theory (i.e., the "management serving the shareowners" theory) is morally untenable".

Donaldson received his PhD at the University of Kansas in 1976 and his BS from the same institution in 1967.

Donaldson has authored or edited several books:

- The Ties that Bind: A Social Contract Approach to Business Ethics, Harvard University Business School Press, 1999, co-authored with Thomas W. Dunfee
- Ethical Issues in Business, 8th edition, Prentice-Hall Inc., 2007, co-edited with Patricia Werhane
- Ethics in Business and Economics, 2 volume set, Ashgate Publishing, 1998, co-edited with Thomas W. Dunfee
- Ethics in International Business, Oxford University Press, 1989
- Corporations and Morality (PDF). Prentice-Hall Inc. 1982. Archived from the original (PDF) on September 1, 2006.

His other writings have appeared in publications such as The Academy of Management Review, the Harvard Business Review, Ethics, Journal of Organizational Behavior, and Economics and Philosophy.

== Awards and distinctions ==
- The 2019 Lifetime Achievement Award from the Society for Business Ethics
- The 2016 Sumner Marcus Award from the Social Issues in Management Division of the Academy of Management.
- The Aspen Institute’s Pioneer Award for Lifetime Achievement.
- His book, Ties that Bind, was the winner of the 2005 SIM Academy of Management Best Book Award
- Chairman of the Social Issues in Management Division of the Academy of Management (2007–2008)
- Founding member and past president of the Society for Business Ethics
- Associate Editor of the Academy of Management Review from 2002–2007
- Named the most influential “thought leader” in Ethisphere Magazine’s 2007 ranking of the 100 Most Influential People in Business Ethics

Prior to 1996 (from 1990 to 1996), he held the position of the John F. Connelly Professor of Business Ethics in the School of Business at Georgetown University. There he was voted Outstanding Teacher of the Year by MBA students and Distinguished Researcher of the Year by business school faculty members.

In the summer of 2002, he testified in the US Senate regarding the Sarbanes-Oxley corporate reform legislation. In October, 2006, he delivered a two-hour address/workshop to the Secretary General of the United Nations, Kofi Annan, and the other Assistant Secretaries General regarding the UN's reform initiative.
