= Keith Lehrer =

American philosopher (born 1936)

- Born: January 10, 1936 (age 90)

Education
- Education: University of Minnesota, Brown University
- Doctoral advisor: Richard Clyde Taylor
- Other advisor: Roderick Chisholm

Philosophical work
- Era: Contemporary philosophy
- Region: Western philosophy
- School: Analytic; Epistemic coherentism
- Institutions: University of Arizona, University of Miami
- Main interests: Epistemology, philosophy of action
- Notable ideas: The distinction between compatibilism and incompatibilism Knowledge as undefeated justified true belief

Keith Lehrer (/ˈlɛərər/; born January 10, 1936) is an American philosopher. He is emeritus Regent's professor of philosophy at the University of Arizona and a research professor of philosophy at the University of Miami, where he spends half of each academic year.

== Education and career ==
Lehrer received his PhD in philosophy from Brown University where he studied under Richard Clyde Taylor and Roderick Chisholm. He joined the faculty at the University of Arizona in 1973, where he helped build a major graduate program. Prior to that, he taught at the University of Rochester.

His research interests include epistemology, free will, rational consensus, Thomas Reid and, recently, aesthetics.

Lehrer is a former president of the Pacific Division of the American Philosophical Association (APA) and also served as the APA executive director for a number of years. He is an elected Fellow of the American Academy of Arts and Sciences.

Lehrer, and his wife Adrienne Lehrer, are also artists. Their work has been on display at the Vincent Gallery in Coconut Grove, Florida, concurrent with his stay at the University of Miami, where he was a visiting professor.

== Philosophical work ==
Lehrer is best known for his defense of a coherentist theory of knowledge. According to Lehrer, "a person is justified in accepting a proposition just in case that proposition coheres with the relevant part of her cognitive system."

Lehrer's work, "Why Not Scepticism?" (WNS) is used in many introductory philosophy courses as a coherent and readable introduction to the subject (1971 Philosophical Forum, vol. II, pp. 283–298). In part VI he critiques Wittgenstein's view that philosophical skepticism is “disguised nonsense” (Philosophical Investigations §464). In Lehrer's textbook, Philosophical Problems and Arguments: An Introduction 4th ed. (PPA), he distinguishes two kinds of nonsense, “epistemic” and “semantic,” and presents examples of each. Lehrer argues that skepticism appears to be preposterously false and therefore is nonsense only in the epistemic sense. Yet the skeptic's sentences are perfectly well-formed and meaningful in the semantic sense (PPA pp 59–60). A Wittgensteinian would respond that the skeptic's well-formed syntax is deceptive. By misusing everyday epistemic language, Lehrer creates the illusion that skepticism is also semantically meaningful. If we cannot know anything for certain as Lehrer claims, then according to Wittgenstein we cannot be certain of the meaning of our words either (On Certainty §114). In Wittgenstein's view, both skepticism and its negation (realism) are epistemic nonsense cloaked in the well-formed syntax of ordinary language. The mistake according to Wittgenstein lies in the assumption that well-formed sentences are semantically meaningful regardless of how one uses them in philosophical contexts. Lehrer on the other hand argues that philosophers have an “extraordinary” linguistic dispensation that allows them to meaningfully engage in epistemic nonsense (WNS p 289). (See also Nonsense § Disguised Epistemic Nonsense)

He has authored seven books on philosophical subjects, and over 170 scholarly articles. Lehrer is perhaps best known for his defense of the coherence theory of justification in epistemology. He is the originator of the widely discussed TrueTemp example.

== Selected publications ==
Books

- Exemplars of Truth (Oxford, 2019)
- Art, Self, and Knowledge (Oxford, 2011)
- Self Trust: A Study of Reason, Knowledge and Autonomy (Oxford, 1997)
- Philosophical Problems and Arguments: An Introduction (Hackett, 1992, 4th ed.), with James Cornman and George Pappas
- Metamind (Oxford, 1990)
- Theory of Knowledge (Westview, 1990)
- Thomas Reid (Routledge, 1989)
- Rational Consensus in Science and Society: A Philosophical and Mathematical Study (D. Reidel, 1981), with Carl Wagner
- Knowledge (Oxford, 1974)

Recent articles

- "Love and Autonomy," in a volume Love Analyzed, ed. R. Lamb, Westview Press, 1997.
- "Semantic Fields and Vectors of Meaning," with Adrienne Lehrer, In Lexical Semantics, Cognition and Philosophy, B. Lewandowska-Tomaszcyzyk, Lødz University Press, 1998.
- "Meaning, Exemplarization and Metarepresentation," written for Metarepresentation, Dan Sperber ed., a volume of Vancouver Studies in Cognitive Science.
- "Acceptance and Belief Reconsidered," in a volume edited by P. Engel, Belief and Acceptance, to be published by Kluwer in Philosophical Studies Series.
- "Justification, Knowledge and Coherence," to be published in Erkenntnis.
- "Rationality," to be published in Guidebook to Epistemology, Blackwell's, edited by J. Greco and E. Sosa.
- "Individualism versus Communitarianism: A Consensual Compromise," written for a symposium at the World Congress of Philosophy, Boston, August, 1998, and to published in the proceedings.
- "Reid, Hume and Common Sense," to be published in Reid Studies.

Books edited

- Knowledge, Teaching and Wisdom (Kluwer, forthcoming), with Jeannie Lum, Beverly Slichta and Nicholas Smith
- Austrian Philosophy, Past & Present (Kluwer, in process), with Johann Marek.
- An Opened Curtain: A U.S.-Soviet Philosophical Summit (Westview, 199), with Ernest Sosa
- Knowledge and Skepticism (Westview, 1989), with Marjorie Clay
- Science and Ethics (Rodopi, 1988) Thomas Reid's Inquiry and Essays (Hackett, 1983), with Ronald Beanblossom
- Analysis and Metaphysics: Essays in Honor of R.M. Chisholm (D. Reidel, 1975)
- New Readings in Philosophical Analysis (Appleton-Century-Crofts, 1972), with Herbert Feigl and Wilfrid Sellars
- Theory of Meaning (Prentice Hall, 1970) with Adrienne Lehrer
- Freedom and Determinism (Random House, 1966).

Books about Keith Lehrer

- Keith Lehrer, edited by Radu Bogdan, Reidel, 1980.
- The Current State of the Coherence Theory: Critical Essays on the Epistemic Theories of Keith Lehrer and Laurence Bonjour, edited by John W. Bender, Kluwer, 1989.
- Metamind, Knowledge, and Coherence: Essays on the Philosophy of Keith Lehrer, edited by Johannes Brandl, Wolfgang Gombocz, and Christian Piller, Rodopi, 1991.
- The Epistemology of Keith Lehrer (Series: Philosophical Studies Series, Vol. 95), edited by Erik J.Olsson, 2003, 364 p., Hardcover.
