= Alex Michalos =

Canadian political scientist and philosopher

Alex Michalos OC
- Born: Alexandros Charles Michalos; August 1, 1935 (age 90)
- Education: Western Reserve University; University of Chicago
- Known for: Quality of life research
- Spouse: Deborah Poff
- Awards: Order of Canada (2010)
- Scientific career
- Fields: Philosophy; Political science
- Institutions: University of Guelph; University of Northern British Columbia
- Thesis: Probability and Degree of Confirmation: A Study of the Disagreement Between Karl Popper and Rudolf Carnap from 1934 to 1964 (1965)

Alexandros Charles Michalos OC (born August 1, 1935) is a Canadian political scientist and philosopher known for his work in quality of life research. He is professor emeritus of political science and former chancellor at the University of Northern British Columbia, where he served as the founding director of the Institute for Social Research and Evaluation. Before joining the University of Northern British Columbia, he taught at the University of Guelph from 1966 to 1994. He served as senior research advisor to the Canadian Index of Wellbeing, and continues to serve as a member of their Canadian Research Advisory Group. He served as president of the International Society for Quality-of-Life Studies from 1999 to 2000. He is the founder or co-founder of seven peer-reviewed academic journals, and as of 2010, still served as editor-in-chief of one of them: the Journal of Business Ethics. He was named a member of the Order of Canada in 2010.
