= Stakeholder theory =

Management and ethical theory that considers multiple constituencies

Examples of a company's internal and external stakeholders

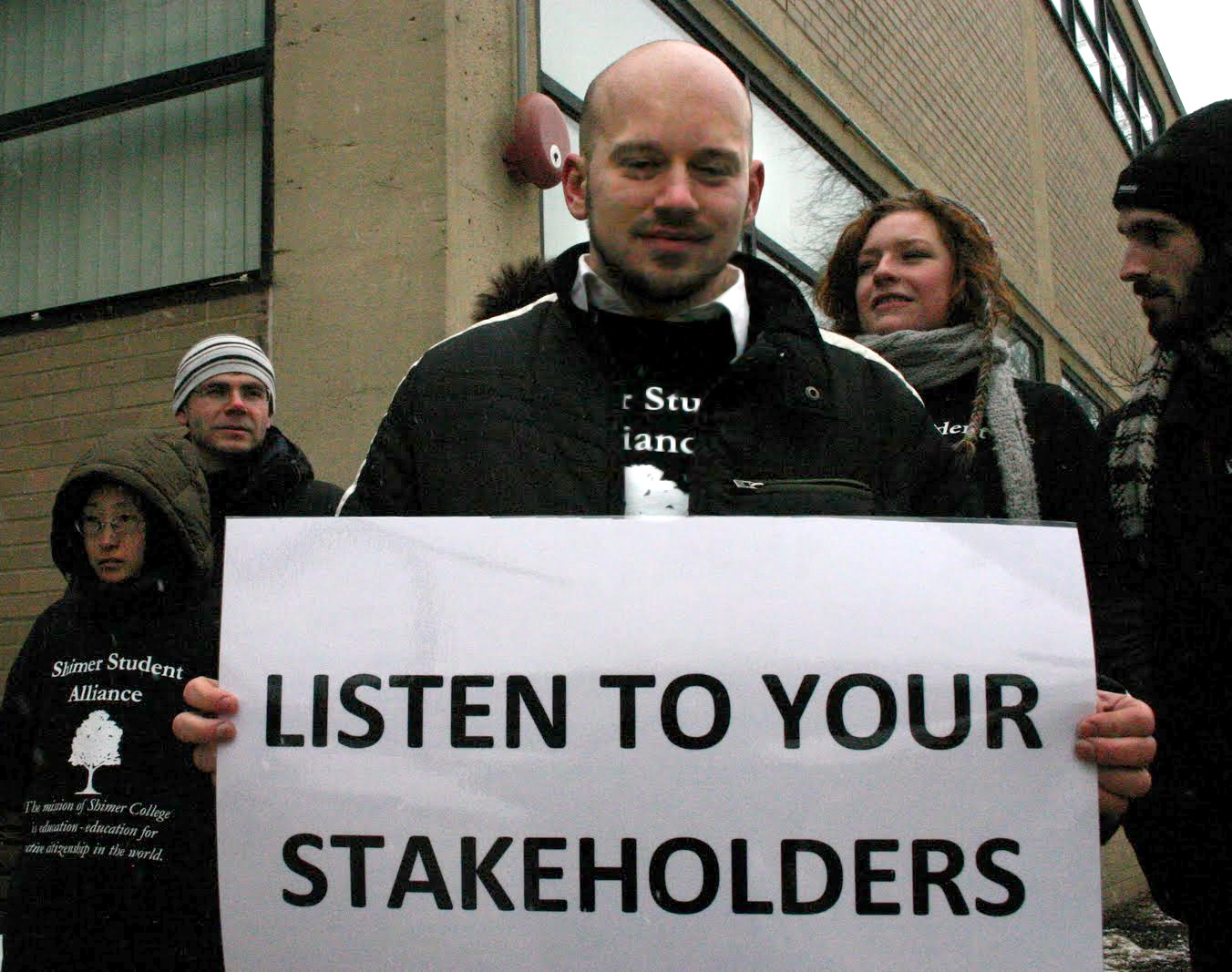
Protesting students invoking stakeholder theory at Shimer College in 2010

The stakeholder theory is a theory of organizational management and business ethics. One common version of stakeholder theory seeks to define the specific stakeholders of a company (the normative theory of stakeholder identification) and then examine the conditions under which managers treat these parties as stakeholders (the descriptive theory of stakeholder salience).

It accounts for multiple constituencies impacted by business entities like employees, suppliers, local communities, creditors, and others. It addresses morals and values in managing an organization, such as those related to corporate social responsibility, market economy, and social contract theory.

The stakeholder view of strategy integrates a resource-based view and a market-based view, and adds a socio-political level.

In fields such as law, management, and human resources, stakeholder theory succeeded in challenging the usual analysis frameworks, by suggesting that stakeholders' needs should be put at the beginning of any action.

== History ==
Concepts similar to modern stakeholder theory can be traced back to longstanding philosophical views about the nature of civil society itself and the relations between individuals. In Miles v Sydney Meat-Preserving Co Ltd (1912), which saw the rejection of a shareholder's legal right to a dividend, Australian chief justice Samuel Griffith observed that:

The law does not require the members of a company to divest themselves, in its management, of all altruistic motives, or to maintain the character of the company as a soulless and bowelless thing, or to exact the last farthing in its commercial dealings, or forbid them to carry on its operations in a way which they think conducive to the best interests of the community as a whole.

The term "stakeholder" in its current use first appeared in an internal memorandum at the Stanford Research Institute in 1963. Eric Rhenman, a Swedish management academic, published in 1964 in Swedish Företagsdemokrati och Företagsorganisation (published in English in 1968) which remains one of the very first published academic conceptualizations of stakeholder and the stakeholder model of the firm. Subsequently, a "plethora" of stakeholder definitions and theories were developed. In 1971, Hein Kroos and Klaus Schwab published a German booklet Moderne Unternehmensführung im Maschinenbau (Modern Enterprise Management in Mechanical Engineering) arguing that the management of a modern enterprise must serve not only shareholders but all stakeholders (die Interessenten) to achieve long-term growth and prosperity. This claim is disputed. U.S. authors followed; for example, in 1983, Ian Mitroff published "Stakeholders of the Organizational Mind" in San Francisco. R. Edward Freeman had an article on Stakeholder theory in the California Management Review in early 1983, but makes no reference to Mitroff's work, attributing the development of the concept to internal discussion in the Stanford Research Institute. He followed this article with a book Strategic Management: A Stakeholder Approach. This book identifies and models the groups which are stakeholders of a corporation, and both describes and recommends methods by which management can give due regard to the interests of those groups. In short, it attempts to address the "principle of who or what really counts".

In the traditional view of a company, the shareholder view, only the owners or shareholders of the company are important, and the company has a binding fiduciary duty to put their needs first, to increase value for them. Stakeholder theory instead argues that there are other parties involved, including employees, customers, suppliers, financiers, communities, governmental bodies, political groups, trade associations, and trade unions. Even competitors are sometimes counted as stakeholders – their status being derived from their capacity to affect the firm and its stakeholders. The nature of what constitutes a stakeholder is highly contested, with hundreds of definitions existing in the academic literature.

== Development ==
Numerous articles and books written on stakeholder theory generally identify Freeman as the "father of stakeholder theory". Freeman's Strategic Management: A Stakeholder Approach (1984) is widely cited in the field as being the foundation of stakeholder theory, although Freeman himself refers to several bodies of literature used in the development of his approach, including strategic management, corporate planning, systems theory, organization theory, and corporate social responsibility. A related field of research examines the concept of stakeholders and stakeholder salience, or the importance of various stakeholder groups to a specific firm.

An anticipation of such concepts, as part of Corporate Social Responsibility, can be found in a publication from 1968 by the Italian economist Giancarlo Pallavicini, creator of "the decomposition method of the parameters" to calculate the results of activities that are not directly related to the economic activities of an enterprise, particularly those concerning ethical, moral, social, cultural, and environmental issues.

More recent scholarly works on the topic of stakeholder theory that exemplify research and theorizing in this area include Donaldson and Preston (1995), Mitchell, Agle, and Wood (1997), Friedman and Miles (2002), and Phillips (2003).

Thomas Donaldson and Lee E. Preston argue that the theory has three distinct but mutually supportive aspects, descriptive, instrumental, and normative:

- The descriptive approach is used in research to describe and explain the characteristics and behaviors of firms, including how companies are managed, how the board of directors considers corporate constituencies, the way that managers think about managing, and the nature of the firm itself.
- The instrumental approach uses empirical data to identify the connections that exist between the management of stakeholder groups and the achievement of corporate goals (most commonly profitability and efficiency goals).
- The normative approach, identified as the core of the theory by Donaldson and Preston, examines the function of the corporation and identifies the "moral or philosophical guidelines for the operation and management of the corporation".

Mitchell, et al. derive a typology of stakeholders based on the attributes of power (the extent a party has means to impose its will in a relationship), legitimacy (socially accepted and expected structures or behaviors), and urgency (time sensitivity or criticality of the stakeholder's claims). By examining the combination of these attributes in a binary manner, 8 types of stakeholders are derived along with their implications for the organization. Friedman and Miles explore the implications of contentious relationships between stakeholders and organizations by introducing compatible/incompatible interests and necessary/contingent connections as additional attributes with which to examine the configuration of these relationships. Robert Allen Phillips distinguishes between normatively legitimate stakeholders (those to whom an organization holds a moral obligation) and derivatively legitimate stakeholders (those whose stakeholder status is derived from their ability to affect the organization or its normatively legitimate stakeholders). Kenneth Goodpaster distinguished stakeholder analysis, which identifies parties affected by managerial decisions, from stakeholder synthesis, which incorporates stakeholder considerations into decision-making; he argued that strategic stakeholder synthesis risks treating stakeholders merely as instruments, while multi-fiduciary stakeholder synthesis risks making managers accountable to an indeterminate set of fiduciary obligations.

== Non-human nature and underrepresented stakeholders ==
A persistent line of development concerns whether stakeholders must be human actors. Mark Starik argued that the non-human natural environment can be integrated into stakeholder management because organizations are embedded in natural environments, because the stakeholder concept need not be restricted to a human political-economic category, and because other stakeholder groups do not adequately represent nature's interests. This position broadened the scope of stakeholder identification from conventional social groups to entities such as ecosystems, species, and the biophysical conditions on which organizations depend.

Other theorists rejected this move within stakeholder theory while still treating environmental obligations as ethically important. Phillips and Reichart argued that a fairness-based account of stakeholder theory cannot assign stakeholder status to the non-human environment because stakeholder obligations arise among persons or groups that voluntarily accept benefits in a cooperative scheme, but they maintained that environmental concerns can enter stakeholder reasoning through legitimate human stakeholders and through non-stakeholder ethical duties. Eric Orts and Alan Strudler similarly argued that stakeholder theory is useful as a heuristic for broadening managerial attention beyond shareholders, but that it cannot by itself supply the ethical principles needed for issues such as legal compliance or the valuation of the natural environment.

More recent work has recast the issue in terms of "unvoiced" and "undervoiced" stakeholders. Sandra Waddock grouped such stakeholders into marginalized or fringe human groups whose claims are often ignored, silent human stakeholders such as future generations, and non-human nature such as places, species, and ecosystems; she argued that their salience becomes clearer when stakeholder reasoning uses an eco-social, whole-system lens rather than only a firm-centred strategic lens. Empirical research on nature-inclusive stakeholder engagement has examined how organizations may treat nature not merely as an external resource but as a partner in value creation. Silvan Oberholzer's study of Indigenous businesses of the Arhuaco, Kogui, Wiwa and Kankuamo peoples in the Sierra Nevada de Santa Marta used interviews, Indigenous-authored secondary sources and observation to propose a multidimensional approach in which organizational actors relate to nature through physical, emotional, mental and spiritual relationships and where nature can guide regenerative value creation.

== Implementation in other fields ==
Stakeholder theory succeeds in becoming famous not only in the business ethics fields; it is used as one of the frameworks in corporate social responsibility methods. For example, ISO 26000 and GRI (Global Reporting Initiative) involve stakeholder analysis.

In the field of business ethics, Weiss, J.W. (2014) illustrates how stakeholder analysis can be complemented with issues management approaches to examine societal, organizational, and individual dilemmas. Several case studies are offered to illustrated uses of these methods.

Stakeholder theory has seen growing uptake in higher education in the late 20th and early 21st centuries. One influential definition defines a stakeholder in the context of higher education as anyone with a legitimate interest in education who thereby acquires a right to intervene. Studies of higher education first began to recognize students as stakeholders in 1975. External stakeholders may include employers. In Europe, the rise of stakeholder regimes has arisen from the shift of higher education from a government-run bureaucracy to modern systems in which the government's role involves more monitoring than direct control.

Economist and university professor Danuše Nerudová, a candidate in the 2023 Czech presidential election, is a proponent of stakeholder capitalism where "questions of sustainability and global politics, as well as the development of domestic societies" will have increased relevance for company and state decision making. Researcher Benjamin Tallis has examined whether a move from neoliberalism to stakeholder capitalism, "which implies a different role for the state as well as a focus on creating more cohesive and resilient societies", could affect public optimism in the Czech Republic.

== Criticism ==
The political philosopher Charles Blattberg has criticized stakeholder theory for assuming that the interests of the various stakeholders can be, at best, compromised or balanced against each other. Blattberg argues that this is a product of its emphasis on negotiation as the chief mode of dialogue for dealing with conflicts between stakeholder interests. He recommends conversation instead and this leads him to defend what he calls a 'patriotic' conception of the corporation as an alternative to that associated with stakeholder theory.

Management scholar Samuel F. Mansell argued that stakeholder theory, by applying the political concept of a 'social contract' to the corporation, undermines the principles on which a market economy is based, and could thereby increase the opportunities of weak stakeholder exploitation by self-interested managers rather than to decrease them. Goodpaster formulated an earlier "stakeholder paradox": a merely strategic use of stakeholder analysis can amount to "business without ethics", whereas treating managers as fiduciaries for all stakeholders can amount to "ethics without business". Michael Jensen argued that traditional stakeholder theory leaves managers with multiple objectives and no principled way to make trade-offs, and proposed "enlightened value maximization" as a way to use stakeholder relationships while retaining long-run firm value as the single objective function. Christopher Stoney and Diana Winstanley argued that the popularity of stakeholding had made the concept blurred and confused, especially because authors differ on whether they use it analytically or prescriptively, for intrinsic or instrumental reasons, and with different assumptions about political intervention and enforcement.

== See also ==
- Agency cost
- Codetermination
- Economic democracy
- Friedman doctrine
- Principal–agent problem
- Stakeholder (corporate)
- Stakeholder (law)
- Stakeholder analysis
- Stakeholder engagement software
- Stakeholder management
- Outline of organizational theory
