= Hastings Center Report =

Bioethics journal

- Discipline: Bioethics, philosophy, ethics, humanities, health policy, health law, religious studies
- Language: English
- Edited by: Gregory Kaebnick

Publication details
- History: 1971-present
- Publisher: Wiley-Blackwell (United States)
- Frequency: Bimonthly
- Impact factor: 2.3 (2024)

Standard abbreviations
- ISO 4: Hastings Cent. Rep.

Indexing
- ISSN: 0093-0334 (print); 1552-146X (web)
- LCCN: 2004-212569
- JSTOR: 00930334
- OCLC no.: 15622366

Links
- Journal homepage; Online access

The Hastings Center Report is a bimonthly peer-reviewed academic journal of bioethics. It is published by Wiley-Blackwell on behalf of the Hastings Center (Garrison, New York). The editor-in-chief is Gregory Kaebnick. According to the Journal Citation Reports, the journal has a 2024 impact factor of 2.3. In 2018, it ranked it 5th out of 16 journals in the category "Medical Ethics".

The journal focuses on legal, moral, and social issues in medicine and the life sciences. It publishes a variety of article types that may take many forms:

- articles that explore philosophical and ethical issues in medicine, health care, technology, medical research, the use of human subjects in research, and the environment
- reports or reviews of empirical studies that implicate relevant philosophical and ethical questions
- short, provocative essays; case studies (which may be accompanied by commentary on the case)
- personal narratives about receiving or providing health care
- and brief commentary on relevant events in the news

== See also ==
- List of ethics journals
