= Teaching Ethics =

- Discipline: Philosophy, education
- Language: English
- Edited by: Edyta Kuzian, Dan Wueste

Publication details
- History: 2001-present
- Publisher: Philosophy Documentation Center (United States)
- Frequency: Biannual

Standard abbreviations
- ISO 4: Teach. Ethics

Indexing
- ISSN: 1544-4031 (print); 2154-0551 (web)
- LCCN: 2003-212233
- OCLC no.: 46517672

Links
- Journal homepage; Online access

Teaching Ethics is a peer-reviewed academic journal devoted to the philosophical examination of ethical issues in all disciplines. Its mission is to foster dialogue about ethics instruction across disciplinary boundaries, with a focus on business, medicine, technology, law, and other areas of liberal education. Notable contributors include Michael Davis, Deni Elliot, Mollie Painter-Morland, Lisa Newton, Louis Pojman, Wade Robison, and Holmes Rolston III. It is sponsored by the Society for Ethics Across the Curriculum. Members receive the journal as a benefit of membership. Members of the American Association of Philosophy Teachers and the Philosophy Learning and Teaching Organization also have access to this journal. It is published by the Philosophy Documentation Center and has a SHERPA/RoMEO "green" self-archiving policy.

== Indexing ==
Teaching Ethics is abstracted and indexed in Academic Search, Education Research Complete, Philosopher's Index, PhilPapers, and TOC Premier.

== See also ==
- List of ethics journals
- List of philosophy journals
