= Journal of Jewish Ethics =

- Discipline: Jewish ethics
- Language: English
- Edited by: Jonathan K. Crane, Emily Filler

Publication details
- History: 2015-present
- Publisher: Penn State University Press (United States)
- Frequency: Biannual

Standard abbreviations
- ISO 4: J. Jew. Ethics

Indexing
- ISSN: 2334-1777 (print); 2334-1785 (web)
- LCCN: 2014201591
- JSTOR: 23341777
- OCLC no.: 1082217204

Links
- Journal homepage; Online Access (JSTOR)

The Journal of Jewish Ethics is a biannual peer-reviewed academic journal covering Jewish ethics. It is sponsored by the Society of Jewish Ethics and published by Penn State University Press. The journal was established in 2015, with Louis E. Newman (Carleton College) and Jonathan K. Crane (Emory University) as founding editors-in-chief. The current editors are Jonathan K. Crane and Emily A. Filler (Earlham College).

== Abstracting and indexing ==
The journal is abstracted and indexed in the following bibliographic databases:

- Atla Religion Database
- Emerging Sources Citation Index
- Scopus

== See also ==
- List of ethics journals
