= Society for Ethics Across the Curriculum =

The Society for Ethics Across the Curriculum (SEAC) is a non-profit learned society based in the United States. Established in 1992, its mission is to stimulate scholarship on ethics and the teaching of ethics in all academic disciplines. The society sponsors the development of ethics-related resources for academic use; holds an annual conference; and produces the scholarly journal Teaching Ethics. The society's activities are supported in part by the Fund for the Improvement of Post-Secondary Education. The society's memberships and its journal are managed by the Philosophy Documentation Center.

== Online resources for members ==
SEAC members have online access to the following publications to support their research:

- Teaching Ethics, 2001–present
- Professional Ethics, 1992-2003
- Business and Professional Ethics Journal, 1981–present

== Annual meetings ==
The annual meetings of the Society for Ethics Across the Curriculum is held each Fall at a different location in the United States.
