= Institute for Business and Professional Ethics =

DePaul University administrative unit

The Institute for Business and Professional Ethics (IBPE) is a business ethics research and development center within the Driehaus College of Business at DePaul University in Chicago, Illinois. It was founded in 1985 in a joint effort between DePaul University's College of Liberal Arts & Social Sciences and Driehaus College of Business to encourage ethical deliberation in decision-makers by stirring their moral conscience, encouraging moral imagination, and stimulating research into business innovation and practices.

The IBPE publishes case studies, books, and journal articles in business ethics, and hosts a series of annual business workshops, conferences and events. It is also the editorial home of the Business and Professional Ethics Journal.

== Mission ==
The IBPE facilitates ethical deliberation in decision-makers by stirring their moral conscience, encouraging moral imagination, and stimulating research in business innovation and practices. We serve as a forum for exploring and fostering ethical practices in business and professions particularly aimed at:

- Students: Teaching students ethical practices and inspiring them to engage in socially responsible initiatives.
- Faculty: Providing resources to support the teaching of ethics in the curriculum, academic programs, research and scholarship.
- Business: Advancing ethical practices in business organizations in the Chicago area.
- Community: Catalyzing the for-profit sector to address local and global social responsibility.

== Leadership ==
The institute maintains an external advisory board of directors composed of entrepreneurs, compliance executives and other members of the business community nationally and in Chicago.

The operations staff includes:

- Daryl Koehn, Managing Director
- Summer Brown, Executive Director
- Regina Robinson, Research Associate

== Notable publications (selection) ==
Textbooks:

- Toward a New (Old) Theory of Responsibility: Moving beyond Accountability (SpringerBriefs in Ethics). Daryl Koehn. (Springer, 2019).
- Aesthetics and Business Ethics (Issues in Business Ethics Book 41). Daryl Koehn and Dawn Elm. (Springer, 2013).
- Rethinking Feminist Ethics: Care, Trust and Empathy. Daryl Koehn. (Routledge, 2012).
- Living With the Dragon: Acting Ethically in a World of Unintended Consequences. Daryl Koehn. (Routledge, 2010).
- Alleviating Poverty through Profitable Partnerships: Globalization, Markets & Economic Well-Being. Patricia Werhane, Scott P. Kelley, Laura P. Hartman, and Dennis J. Moberg. (Routledge, 2010).
- Business Ethics as Practice: Ethics as the Everyday Business of Business. Mollie Painter-Morland. (Cambridge, 2008).
- Effective & Ethical Practices in Global Corporations. Edited by Laura P Hartman and Patricia Werhane. (Routledge, 2009).
- Leadership, Gender and Organization. Mollie Painter-Morland and Patricia Werhane. (Springer, 2010).
- Rising Above Sweatshops: Innovative Management Approaches to Global Labor Challenges. Laura P Hartman, Denis Arnold, and Richard Wokutch. (Praeger, 2003).

Journal

The Business and Professional Ethics Journal is a peer-reviewed academic journal for interdisciplinary research that explores the systemic causes of ethical challenges in business and professional life. The Journal provides an outlet for papers that make significant contributions to the development of alternative theories and practices within business and professional ethics, and that examine why global ethical issues, such as poverty alleviation and sustainability, emerge and persist. The institute assumed editorial responsibility for BPEJ in 2010.

== Society of Business Ethics ==
The IBPE maintains close relations with the Society for Business Ethics, a non-profit association that promotes the advancement and understanding of ethics in business. Members of the IBPE team have worked for many years in cooperation with members of the Society for Business Ethics to promote open and thoughtful discussion of the most difficult moral, legal, empirical, and philosophical issues of business ethics.

== International Vincentian Business Ethics Conference ==
The International Vincentian Business Ethics Conference (IVBEC) is an annual event co-hosted by Dublin City University, the IBPE and DePaul University, Niagara University, and St. John's University. IVBEC attracts leading academics to examine, discuss and develop the role of business ethics in current economic, political, corporate and social life.

== Wicklander Fellowship ==
The Wicklander Fellowship is awarded annually to two full-time DePaul faculty members who demonstrate an interest in applied or professional ethics as these topics relate to their particular field of research. Past fellows have included faculty from accountancy, law, philosophy, religious studies, political science, communication and management, among others.

== Patricia H. Werhane Business Ethics Scholarship ==
The Patricia H. Werhane Business Ethics Scholarship awards an annual scholarship to a junior or senior DePaul University student. This student must have a GPA of 3.0 or higher and must also either be an undergraduate student with a business major (any discipline in the Driehaus College of Business) and a philosophy minor, OR a philosophy major and business minor.

== B Academics ==
IBPE is a co-founder and sponsor of B Academics, an academic professional organization made up of a global community of educators and researchers that provide resources to academics interested in benefit corporations and social enterprises. B Academics also hosts annual roundtables, webinars and workshops. IBPE Executive Director Summer Brown currently serves as a board member and secretary.

== "Big Questions" ==
Inspired by the prospect of video case studies several years ago, the Institute partnered with the late DePaul College of Communication faculty member Kim Clark to create a documentary television series focusing on issues of social justice and poverty alleviation.

"Big Questions" is part documentary, part talk show, and engages with some of the world's most critical challenges. Patricia Werhane and Kim Clark served as hosts, each bringing years of experience and knowledge to help shed light on new ideas and projects that are changing the way the world works.

The stories range from Chicago-focused issues such as food deserts and national issues like criminal recidivism, to international topics of health care in Ghana and Tanzania, and microlending in Bangladesh.

The series won a 2015 Chicago/Midwest Emmy award.
