= Roderick Chisholm =

American philosopher (1916–1999)

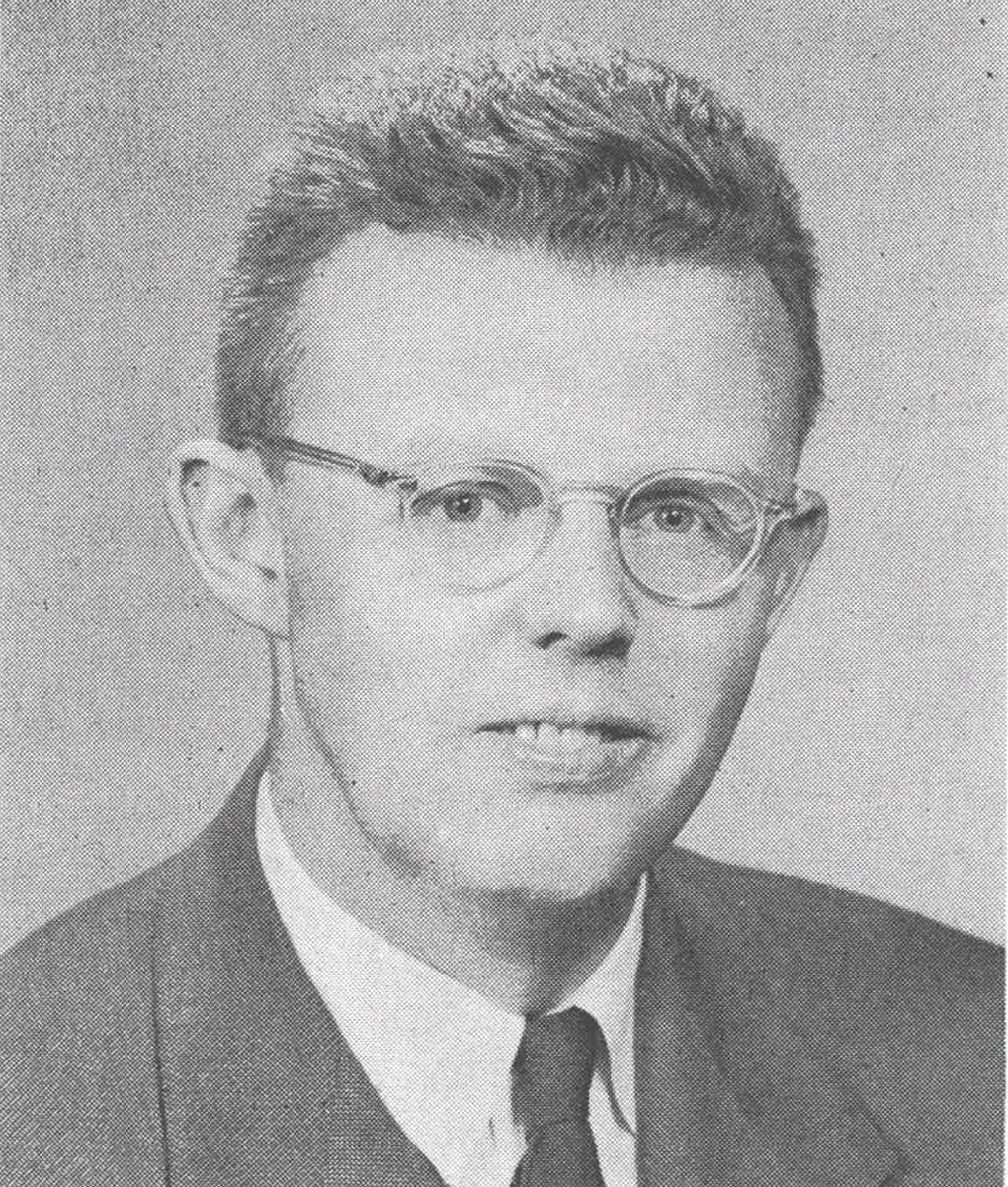
- Chisholm, c. 1955
- Born: Roderick Milton Chisholm; November 27, 1916; North Attleboro, Massachusetts, U.S.
- Died: January 19, 1999 (aged 82); Providence, Rhode Island, U.S.

Education
- Education: Brown University; Harvard University
- Thesis: The Basic Propositions of the Theory of Knowledge (1942)
- Doctoral advisor: C. I. Lewis, D. C. Williams
- Other advisor: Curt John Ducasse

Philosophical work
- Era: 20th-century philosophy
- Region: Western philosophy
- School: Analytic philosophy
- Institutions: Brown University
- Doctoral students: Richard Cartwright, Dale Jacquette, Charles Taliaferro, Richard Clyde Taylor, Dean Zimmerman
- Notable students: Keith Lehrer
- Main interests: Epistemology; Metaphysics
- Notable ideas: Direct attribution theory of reference, contrary-to-fact conditional, latitudinarianism, agent causation

Roderick Milton Chisholm (/ˈtʃɪzəm/ CHIZ-əm; November 27, 1916 – January 19, 1999) was an American philosopher known for his work on epistemology, metaphysics, free will, value theory, deontology, deontic logic and the philosophy of perception.

Richard and Fred Feldman, writing in the Stanford Encyclopedia of Philosophy, remark that he "is widely regarded as one of the most creative, productive, and influential American philosophers of the 20th Century."

== Biography ==
=== Early life and education ===
Chisholm graduated from Brown University in 1938 and received his Ph.D. at Harvard University in 1942 under Clarence Irving Lewis and D. C. Williams.

=== U.S. Army service ===
He was drafted into the United States Army in July 1942 and did basic training at Fort McClellan in Alabama. Chisholm administered psychological tests in Boston and New Haven. In 1943 he married Eleanor Parker, whom he had met as an undergraduate at Brown.

=== Academic career ===
He spent his academic career at Brown University and served as president of the Metaphysical Society of America in 1973.

He was editor of Philosophy and Phenomenological Research from 1980 until 1986.

Chisholm trained many distinguished philosophers, including Selmer Bringsjord, Fred Feldman, Keith Lehrer, James Francis Ross, Richard Taylor, and Dean Zimmerman. He also had a significant influence on many colleagues, including Jaegwon Kim and Ernest Sosa.

== Philosophy ==
Chisholm's first major work was Perceiving (1957). His epistemological views were summed up in a popular text, Theory of Knowledge, which appeared in three very different editions (1966, 1977, and 1989). His masterwork was Person and Object, its title deliberately contrasting with W. V. O. Quine's Word and Object. Chisholm was a metaphysical Platonist in the tradition of Bertrand Russell, and a rationalist in the tradition of Russell, G. E. Moore, and Franz Brentano; he objected to Quine's anti-realism, behaviorism, and relativism.

Chisholm defended the possibility of empirical knowledge by appeal to a priori epistemic principles whose consequences include that it is more reasonable to trust your senses and memory in most situations than to doubt them. His theory of knowledge was also famously "foundationalist" in character: all justified beliefs are either "directly evident" or supported by chains of justified beliefs that ultimately lead to beliefs that are directly evident. He also defended a controversial theory of volition called "agent causation" much like that of Thomas Reid. He argued that free will is incompatible with determinism, and believed that we do act freely; this combination of views is known as libertarianism.

He developed a highly original theory of first person thought according to which the things we believe are properties, and believing them is a matter of self-attributing them. (A similar view was developed independently by David Kellogg Lewis, and enjoys considerable popularity, although it is now known mainly through Lewis's work.) Chisholm was also famous for defending the possibility of robust self-knowledge (against the skeptical arguments of David Hume), and an objective ethics of requirements similar to that of W. D. Ross. Chisholm's other books include The Problem of the Criterion, Perceiving, The First Person and A Realist Theory of the Categories, though his numerous journal articles are probably better known than any of these.

Chisholm read widely in the history of philosophy, and frequently referred to the work of Ancient, Medieval, Modern, and even Continental philosophers (although the use he made of this material has sometimes been challenged). Nonetheless, he greatly respected the history of philosophy, in the face of a prevailing indifference among Analytic philosophers. Chisholm translated some work by Brentano and by Husserl, and contributed to the post-1970 renaissance of mereology.

=== Direct attribution theory of reference ===
Chisholm argued for the primacy of the mental over linguistic intentionality, as suggested in the title of Person and Object (1976) that was deliberately contrasted with Quine's Word and Object (1960). In this regard, he defended the direct attribution theory of reference in The First Person (1981). He argues that we refer to things other than ourselves by indirectly attributing properties to them, and that we indirectly or relatively attribute properties to them by directly attributing properties to ourselves. Suppose the following bed scene:

(1) a man M is in bed B with a woman W, namely, M-B-W, or
(2) a woman W is in bed B with a man M, namely, W-B-M.

If I were M and "U" were W, then I could directly attribute to myself the property (1) or M-B-W, while indirectly to "U" the property (2) or W-B-M, thereby referring to "U". That is, to say (1) is relatively to say (2), or to explicate M-B-W is to implicate W-B-M.

His idea of indirect attribution (1981) is relevant to John Searle's "indirect speech act" (1975) and Paul Grice's "implicature" (1975), in addition to entailment.

=== "Chisholming" ===
Stylistically, Chisholm was known for formulating definitions and subsequently revising them in the light of counterexamples. This led to a joke definition of a new verb:

chisholm, v. To make repeated small alterations in a definition or example. "He started with definition (d.8) and kept chisholming away at it until he ended up with (d.8′′′′′′′′)."

— Daniel Dennett and Asbjørn Steglich-Petersen, The Philosophical Lexicon, 2008

While intended as a joke, the term has found some use in serious philosophical papers (for example, Kevin Meeker's "Chisholming away at Plantinga's critique of epistemic deontology").

=== Persistence and identity ===
In his book Person and Object (1976), Chisholm endorses a mereological essentialism for everyday objects such as tables and chairs. He distinguishes two ways of thinking about the identity of such objects and how they may lose or gain parts over time: a "strict philosophical sense" and a "loose sense." In a strict philosophical sense, we must say that everyday vulgar objects do not persist through even the slightest change of parts. This is a strict mereological essentialist view. If any part of an everyday or 'vulgar' object is lost or gained over time, the object would cease to exist. (See Chisholm's Stanford Encyclopedia entry for more about vulgar objects). The object from before is now a new and different one. Chisholm argues that these vulgar objects persist through time only in a philosophically loose sense. If we consider these objects carefully, they are better understood as merely feigning identity, what Chisholm calls "ontological parasites" or ens per alio. If we consider a table in which we change out individual parts each day for a week, we may, at the end of the week, say there has only been one table in front of us; however, this is only the loose way of talking. The single 'table' we are referring to in that sentence is really only (Chisholm borrowing a phrase from Hume) a 'succession of related objects.' The single "table" we refer to plays loose with identity. In a strict philosophical sense, if the table has had seven changes to its parts, there have been seven different tables. We may innocently discuss much of the world around us as persisting through change in the loose sense, but when we consider strict philosophical puzzles, we must not be fooled by ontological parasites.

Chisholm considers this theory with the famous philosophical puzzle of The Ship of Theseus. According to mereological essentialism, once a single plank of the ship is removed, the ship has become a different object. We may continue to talk about the Ship of Theseus as if it persisted, but this would only be in the loose sense discussed above. Chisholm solves the puzzle by saying that, in the strict and philosophical sense, there is no persistence between the mereologically different objects. Note the possible implication for the "reconstructed ship" that is often a part of the thought experiment. If every single part of the original ship were saved perfectly, so that they were materially identical and rebuilt next to the new ship, Chisholm's mereological essentialism may lead him to agree that this is the original Ship of Theseus.

However, Chisholm's mereological essentialism does not extend to persons. Persons, unlike everyday vulgar material objects like ships and tables, persist in the strict and philosophical sense, even when they change their parts. This runs counter to his mereological essentialism in vulgar objects. He provides various arguments for why there is such a dividing line between the two and why persons are special. One argument is from the first hand experience of the unity of consciousness. He argues that these evidences, first person reporting and consciousness, are strong and should be innocent until proven guilty. He offers thought experiments as evidence including the surgery example and the use of Leibniz's law (identity of indiscernibles).

The surgery thought experiment (attributed to Charles Sanders Peirce) runs like this. Imagine you could save a substantial amount of money by undergoing surgery without an anesthesia. Instead, you will be given drugs afterwards that cause amnesia of the whole experience. You ask your friends and family what to do and they encourage you to skip the anesthesia and save the money. They have come up with a solution to help you avoid the pain of undergoing the surgery fully aware:

"Have no fear,” they will say. “Take the cheaper operation and we will take care of everything. We will lay down the convention that the man on the table is not you, Jones, but is Smith.” What ought to be obvious to you, it seems to me, is that the laying down of this convention should have no effect at all upon your decision. For you may still ask, “But won’t that person be I?” and, it seems to me, the question has an answer.

Chisholm's point is that our identity and persistence as person is not like the mere convention of the loose persistence of vulgar objects. Regardless of the convention, you will still experience the pain of the surgery. This is meant to strengthen his position that persons have strict philosophical persistence and are ens per se and not merely ens per alio. Persons are entities in themselves; vulgar objects are merely entities through another, or by entities by mere convention. Hence, if this thought experiment provides the intuition that we are not mere conventions, then mereological essentialism must be false for persons.

A second thought experiment is modal. It asks whether I, as a person, can persist with my identity through the loss of a hand. The answer according to first person reporting and the experience of consciousness is yes. If I have survived the loss of my hand (a mereological part) then mereological essentialism cannot hold for persons. This applies to Leibniz's Law in the following way. If my body were identical to its collection of parts then the collection of parts could not survive the loss of my hand. Leibniz's Law therefore implies that either I must not merely be the collection of parts that was my body or I am no longer myself. The evidence of consciousness rules out the latter; therefore, mereological essentialism must be false for persons. If mereological essentialism held for persons, then I would have been annihilated along with my hand.

== Bibliography ==
- Perceiving: A Philosophical Study (Ithaca: Cornell University Press), 1957.
- Realism and the Background of Phenomenology (Free Press), 1960.
- Chisholm delivered the Lindley Lecture at the University of Kansas on 23 April 1964, on "human freedom and the self". The Lindley Lecture Series was instituted at the university in memory of Ernest H. Lindley, who was Chancellor there from 1920 to 1939.
- Person and Object: A Metaphysical Study (London: G. Allen & Unwin), 1976.
- Essays on the Philosophy of Roderick M. Chisholm (ed. R.M. Chisholm and Ernest Sosa. Amsterdam: Rodopi), 1979.
- The First Person: An Essay on Reference and Intentionality (Minneapolis: University of Minnesota Press), 1981.
- The Foundations of Knowing (Minneapolis: University of Minnesota Press), 1982.
- Brentano and Meinong Studies (Atlantic Highlands, N.J.: Humanities Press), 1982.
- Brentano and Intrinsic Value (New York: Cambridge University Press), 1986.
- Roderick M. Chisholm (ed. Radu J. Bogdan. Boston: D. Reidel Publishing Company), 1986.
- On Metaphysics (Minneapolis: University of Minnesota Press), 1989.
- Theory of Knowledge (Englewood Cliffs, N.J.: Prentice Hall), 1st ed. 1966, 2nd ed. 1977, 3rd ed. 1989.
- "The Nature of Epistemic Principles", Noûs 24: 209–16, 1990.
- "On the Simplicity of the Soul", Philosophical Perspectives 5: 157–81, 1991.
- "Agents, Causes, and Events: The Problem of Free Will" in: Timothy O'Connor, ed. Agents, Causes, and Events: Essays on Indeterminism and Free Will (New York: Oxford University Press): 95–100, 1995.
- A Realistic Theory of Categories: An Essay on Ontology (New York: Cambridge University Press), 1996.

== See also ==
- American philosophy
- List of American philosophers
