= Politics, Philosophy & Economics =

- Discipline: Political science, philosophy, economics
- Language: English
- Edited by: Thomas Christiano, Jonathan Riley, Andrew Williams

Publication details
- History: 2002–present
- Publisher: SAGE Publications
- Frequency: Quarterly
- Impact factor: 0.512 (2015)

Standard abbreviations
- ISO 4: Politics Philos. Econ.

Indexing
- ISSN: 1470-594X (print); 1741-3060 (web)
- LCCN: 2002200174
- OCLC no.: 49397946

Links
- Journal homepage; Online access; Online archive

Politics, Philosophy & Economics is a quarterly peer-reviewed academic journal that covers philosophical aspects of political science and economy. It was established in 2002 and is published by SAGE Publications.

== Abstracting and indexing ==
The journal is abstracted and indexed in Academic Search Premier, the British Humanities Index, Current Contents, the Economic Literature Index, Scopus, and the Social Sciences Citation Index. According to the Journal Citation Reports, the journal has a 2015 impact factor of 0.512, ranking it 115th out of 163 journals in the category "Political Science" and 37th out of 51 journals in the category "Ethics".

== See also ==
- List of ethics journals
- List of political science journals
