= Society for Business Ethics =

American non-profit organization

The Society for Business Ethics is a non-profit organization established in 1980 to promote the advancement and understanding of ethics in business. Its mission is to provide a forum in which moral, legal, empirical, and philosophical issues of business ethics may be openly discussed and analyzed. Members include scholars, students, and professionals from several countries with a common interest in research, teaching, or the application of ethical principles to business management. The society sponsors a scholarly journal, Business Ethics Quarterly, publishes a newsletter, and hosts an annual conference. Individual members receive access to the journal, the right to vote for candidates for the Board of Directors, and a discount on registration for the annual conference.

== Objectives ==
The Society for Business Ethics exists to keep thinking and discussion surrounding business ethics alive and well. To that end, the Society strives to:

- Promote the study of business ethics
- Provide a forum in which moral, legal, empirical, and philosophical issues of business ethics may be openly discussed and analyzed
- Provide a means by which those interested in and concerned with business ethics may exchange ideas
- Promote research and scholarship through the regular publication of the journal Business Ethics Quarterly
- Promote the improvement of the teaching of business ethics in universities and organizations
- Foster a better understanding between college and university administrators and those engaged in teaching and research in the field of business ethics
- Help develop ethical business organizations
- Develop and maintain a friendly and cooperative relationship among teachers, researchers, and practitioners in the field of business and organizational ethics

== Presidents ==
The following persons have been president of the society:

- 1980 Richard De George, Thomas Donaldson, Pat Werhane
- 1981 Thomas Donaldson
- 1982 Pat Werhane
- 1983 Ken Goodpaster
- 1984 Richard De George
- 1985 Richard De George, Thomas Donaldson, Manny Velasquez
- 1986 Thomas Donaldson
- 1987 Manny Velasquez
- 1988 Norman Bowie
- 1989 Mike Hoffman
- 1990 Bill Frederick
- 1991 Lisa Newton
- 1992 Jennifer Moore
- 1993 Leo Ryan
- 1994 R. Edward Freeman
- 1995 Thomas W. Dunfee
- 1996 Laura Nash
- 1997 John Boatright
- 1998 Archie Carroll
- 1999 George Brenkert
- 2000 John Dienhart
- 2001 Laura Hartman
- 2002 Daryl Koehn
- 2003 Donna Wood
- 2004–2006 Dennis Moberg
- 2006 Edwin Hartman
- 2007 Richard Nielsen
- 2008 Robert Allen Phillips
- 2009 Joanne Ciulla
- 2010 Ian Maitland
- 2011 Denis Arnold
- 2012 Ron Duska
- 2013 Brian Husted
- 2014 Joe DesJardins
- 2015 Nien-He Hsieh
- 2016 Heather Elms
- 2017 Jeffery Smith
- 2018 Jeffrey Moriarty
- 2019 Jeffrey Frooman

== Board of directors ==
Each year members of the Society for Business Ethics elect a new member to the Board of Directors. The Board is the governing body of our Society and is responsible for all major policy decisions affecting the Society. Members of the Board of Directors serve a five year term. During the first year on the Board an individual serves as the Board member-at-large, during second year as secretary, during the third year as program chair (for our annual conference), during the fourth year as our Society’s president, and during the fifth year as Immediate Past President.

== Publications ==
The society publishes:

- Business Ethics Quarterly, 1991–present
- The Ruffin Series of the Society for Business Ethics
- Society For Business Ethics Newsletter, 1989–present
- Spiritual Goods: Faith Traditions and the Practice of Business, 2001

== Annual meetings ==
Meetings of the Society are held in late July or early August, generally in conjunction with the meetings of the Academy of Management. Information about the upcoming annual conference appears on the Society’s website.
