= Journal of Academic Ethics =

Journal focusing on ethical issues

- Discipline: Ethics
- Language: English
- Edited by: Loreta Tauginienė PhD; Shiva Das Sivasubramaniam BSc, PhD

Publication details
- History: 2003–present
- Publisher: Springer (Netherlands)
- Frequency: Quarterly
- ISO 4: Find out here

Indexing
- ISSN: 1570-1727 (print); 1572-8544 (web)

Links
- Journal homepage

The Journal of Academic Ethics is a peer-reviewed publication that spans multiple disciplines, focusing on ethical issues within the scope of university purposes. It features original research regarding the ethics involved in research creation and dissemination; teaching and student relations; leadership; management and governance. The journal thoroughly explores topics such as the ethical implications of university strategic directions; responsible investment practices; sustainability initiatives; and the accountable conduct of both research and teaching; collegiality among faculty; and suitable models for ethical governance in universities.

Among its board members are worth mentioning Richard P. Nielsen, Deborah C. Poff, and Denis Collins,

== Abstracting and Indexing ==
The journal is indexed in:

- SCOPUS
- EBSCO
- Gale
