= Deborah C. Poff =

Canadian educator

Deborah C. Poff CM is a Canadian philosopher, educator, and journal editor.

Deborah C. Poff is the former President and Vice-Chancellor at Brandon University in Brandon, Manitoba. She serves as editor of two major publications in the field of ethics. She was the Vice-President for Strategic Development at the Pacific Coast University for Workplace Health Sciences, Canada, before retiring.

== Biography ==
Poff received a B.A. (Hons.) in psychology from the University of Guelph, a B.A (Hons.) in philosophy from Queens University in Ontario, a master's degree in philosophy from Carleton University and a doctorate in philosophy from the University of Guelph. She taught logic, philosophy of science, and business ethics at the University of Alberta and chaired the Women's Studies Department at Mount St. Vincent University in Halifax, Nova Scotia.

She was the first Dean of Arts and Sciences at the newly founded University of Northern British Columbia and serves as co-editor-in-chief at the Journal of Business Ethics and the Journal of Academic Ethics. She was Vice President and Provost at UNBC before becoming President of Brandon University in 2004. She is President of the Canadian "National Council on Ethics in Human Research" and serves on the board of the "Nuclear Waste Management Organization."

She was awarded the Order of Canada in 2016 for her "contributions to the success of academic institutions as an administrator, and for her efforts to create educational opportunities for Indigenous peoples."

She was elected Chair of the Committee on Publication Ethics (COPE) in 2019.
