= Moral Philosophy and Politics =

- Discipline: Philosophy
- Language: English
- Edited by: Michael Schefczyk

Publication details
- History: 2014–present
- Publisher: De Gruyter
- Frequency: biannual
- Open access: hybrid

Standard abbreviations
- ISO 4: Moral Philos. Politics

Indexing
- ISSN: 2194-5616 (print); 2194-5624 (web)

Links
- Journal homepage; Online access

Moral Philosophy and Politics (MOPP) is a biannual academic journal that specializes in moral, political, social and legal philosophy.

== About ==
Moral Philosophy and Politics publishes both freestanding articles as well as themed special issues and symposia. The journal was established in 2014 by Lukas H. Meyer, Mark Peacock, Peter Schaber and Michael Schefczyk. Its editor-in-chief is Michael Schefczyk (Karlsruhe Institute of Technology).

The journal employs a double-blind review process and is published by De Gruyter.

Notable authors for the journal include Linda Bosniak, Jason Brennan, Gillian Brock, Matthew Kramer, David Miller, Margaret Moore, Julian Savulescu, Philip Pettit, and Natalie Stoljar. The journal has published special issues and symposia on such topics as brain drain, fair trade, the limits of markets, and discrimination.

== Abstracting and Indexing ==
The journal is abstracted and indexed in EBSCO Discovery Service, The Philosopher's Index, PhilPapers, ProQuest, SCImago (SJR) and Scopus, among others.

== See also ==
- List of ethics journals
- List of philosophy journals
- List of political science journals
