= Joanne B. Ciulla =

American philosopher (born 1952)

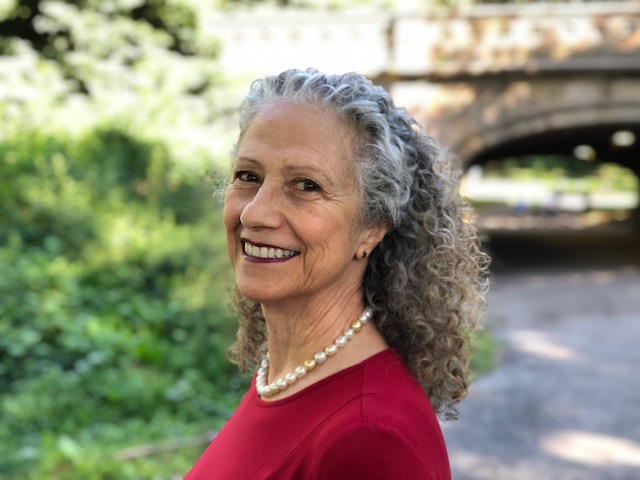
- Born: June 16, 1952 (age 74); Rochester, New York
- Education: Ph.D. Temple University, 1985 M.A. University of Delaware, 1976 B.A. University of Maryland, 1973
- Occupations: professor and director, Institute for Ethical Leadership
- Spouse: René Kanters (m. 1990)

Joanne Bridgett Ciulla (born June 16, 1952) is an American philosopher. She is a pioneer in the field of leadership ethics as well as teaching and publishing on business Ethics. She is currently a professor at the Rutgers Business School - Newark and New Brunswick and is the director of the Institute for Ethical Leadership. She has received several awards for her contributions to leadership studies and business ethics.

== Biography ==
Born in Rochester, New York, Ciulla received a B.A. in philosophy from the University of Maryland, College Park. in 1973, a M.A. in philosophy from the University of Delaware in 1976 and later a Ph.D. from Temple University in 1985.

Her teaching career began in the philosophy department at La Salle University in 1975. In 1984, she went to Harvard Business School as the Harvard Postdoctoral Fellow in Business and Ethics. She then taught as a senior fellow at the Wharton School in 1986. In 1991, she became the Coston Family Chair in Leadership and Ethics at the Jepson School of Leadership Studies, at the University of Richmond. There she was one of the four faculty who designed the Jepson School and its curriculum. She retired from the University of Richmond in 2016 as Professor Emerita and became Professor of Leadership Ethics and the Director of the Institute for Ethical Leadership at Rutgers Business School. She was president of the Society for Business Ethics (2009–2010) and International Society for Business Economics and Ethics (ISBEE) (2012–2016).

She married René P. F. Kanters, a chemist and software developer, in 1990. They live in New York City.

== Work ==
Ciulla's writing investigates the ethical challenges that are distinctive to leadership and stem from the demands of being both ethical and effective. Some of her work uses history and philosophy to understand the ethical dynamics of leadership. She began developing the field of leadership ethics in 1995 with her article "Leadership Ethics: Mapping the Territory" and published a textbook that used cases and primary philosophical sources to explore ethical questions in leadership. To bring more scholars into the field, she published several edited collections, and co-edited a reference work of primary sources in leadership ethics.

=== Leadership ethics ===
Leadership ethics emerged as a field of study in around 1995. Like business ethics, medical ethics, and other areas of applied ethics, it consists of a distinctive set of ethical challenges related to the role of leaders and their relationship with followers, and other stakeholders. Leadership ethics is part of the literature in leadership studies and business ethics. However, it is also relevant to a number of other areas in professional ethics because professionals often take on the roles of leaders. Research in leadership ethics is interdisciplinary and the literature includes work by philosophers, social scientists, and management scholars. It encompasses work on topics such as ethical leadership, toxic leadership, power, trust, care, responsibility, along with a number of philosophical problems such as dirty hands and moral luck. Some of the literature draws on classical sources in philosophy such as Aristotle and Kant, to examine a variety of ethical questions related to leadership.

== Selected works ==
- Ciulla, Joanne B. editor, Ethics, The Heart of Leadership. Westport, CT: Quorum Books, 1998, 2nd edition Praeger 2004, 3rd edition, 2014.
- Ciulla, Joanne B. The Working Life: The Promise and Betrayal of Modern Work. New York: Times Business Books, 2000, Crown Business Books, 2001 & Three Rivers Press, 2002. Chinese translation, Taipei: Commonwealth Publishing, 2002. Japanese translation, Tokyo: Shoeisha Publishing, 2004. Korean translation, Seoul: Dawoo Publishing, 2005.
- Ciulla, Joanne B., editor. The Ethics of Leadership, Belmont, CA: Wadsworth Publishing, 2003.
- Ciulla, Joanne B., Price, Terry L. and Murphy, Susan E., editors. The Quest for Moral Leaders: Essays on Leadership Ethics. Cheltenham, UK and Northhampton, MA: Edward Elgar Publishing, 2005.
- Ciulla, Joanne B., Martin, Clancy and Solomon Robert C., editors. Honest Work: A Business Ethics Reader. New York: Oxford University Press, 1st 2006, 2nd 2011, 3rd edition 2014, 4th edition, 2018.
- Ciulla, Joanne B. set editor (3 volumes). Leadership at the Crossroads, Westport, CT: Praeger, 2008. Volume Editor Leadership and the Humanities vol. 3, Leadership at the Crossroads, Westport, CT: Praeger, 2008.
- Ciulla, Joanne B., Uhl-Bien, Mary, Werhane Patricia J. editors. Leadership Ethics (3 Volumes), London: Sage, 2013.
- Ciulla, Joanne B. and Scharding, Tobey K., editors. Ethical Leadership in Troubling Times. Cheltenham, UK and Northhampton, MA: Edward Elgar Publishing, 2019.
- Ciulla, Joanne B. The Search for Ethics in Leadership, Business, and Beyond. Cham, Switzerland: Springer International Publishing, 2020.

== Awards and honors ==
- 2003 Outstanding Educator Award, The Virginia State Council of Higher Education
- 2007 Distinguished Educator Award from the University of Richmond
- 2017 Master Ethics Teacher Award, The Wheatley Institution, Brigham Young University and the Society for Business Ethics
- 2017-2020 Fulbright Specialist
- 2018 Eminent Leadership Scholar Award from Network of Leadership Scholars, The Academy of Management for "research and contribution to the field of Leadership Studies"
- 2018 Distinguished Service Award to the Field of Business Ethics, Society for Business Ethics
- 2018 Lifetime Achievement Award, International Leadership Association for "prominent published works resulting in significant contributions to the field of leadership studies"
- 2019 Lifetime Achievement Award, for outstanding Scholarly Achievement in the field of Business Ethics, Society for Business Ethics
