= Journal of Business Ethics =

- Discipline: Business ethics
- Language: English
- Edited by: Michelle Greenwood, Gazi Islam

Publication details
- History: 1982–present
- Publisher: Springer
- Frequency: 28 issues/year
- Impact factor: 6.3 (2025)

Standard abbreviations
- ISO 4: J. Bus. Ethics

Indexing
- ISSN: 0167-4544 (print); 1573-0697 (web)
- JSTOR: 01674544

Links
- Journal homepage

The Journal of Business Ethics is a peer-reviewed academic journal published by Springer.

The Journal of Business Ethics was founded by Alex C. Michalos (Institute for Social Research and Evaluation, University of Northern British Columbia) and Deborah C. Poff (Department of Philosophy, Carleton University) and originally published by D. Reidel. Professors Michalos and Poff served as the journal's Editors in Chief from its inception in 1982 to 2016. They were succeeded by R. Edward Freeman (Darden Business School, University of Virginia) and Michelle Greenwood (Department, of Management, Monash University) in 2016. Professor Freeman retired from the Journal in 2021 and was succeeded by Gazi Islam (Grenoble Ecole de Management). Consequently, the current Editors in Chief are Michelle Greenwood and Gazi Islam. D. Reidel became part of Springer in 2004.

== Aims and Scope ==
The Journal of Business Ethics aims to improve the human condition by providing a public forum for discussion and debate about ethical issues related to business. The journal's emphasis is on the "ethics" of business ethics, with the goal of promoting dialogue between diverse publics, both academic and civil society.

The editors encourage a broad scope, and the JBE publishes original articles from a wide variety of methodological and disciplinary perspectives concerning ethical issues related to business that bring something new or unique to the discourse in their field. The term 'business' is understood in a wide sense to include all systems involved in the exchange of goods and services, while 'ethics' concerns human action aimed at promoting a good life. Systems of production, consumption, marketing, advertising, social and economic accounting, labour relations, public relations and organisational behaviour are analysed from a moral viewpoint. Speculative philosophy as well as reports of empirical research are welcomed. The style and level of dialogue involve all who are interested in business ethics – civil society, business actors, universities, government agencies and consumer groups.

== Sections ==
To accommodate this wide scope, the journal has within it the following 33 sections:

- Accounting and Business Ethics
- Arts, Humanities, and Business Ethics
- Behavioural Business Ethics
- Book (and More) Reviews
- Business Ethics Learning and Education
- Consumer Ethics
- Corporate Governance and Business Ethics
- Corporate Responsibility: Theoretical/Qualitative Issues
- Corporate Responsibility: Quantitative Issues
- Corporate Sustainability and Business Ethics
- Critical Studies and Business Ethics
- Cross-cultural Management and Business Ethics
- Economics and Business Ethics
- Environment and Business Ethics
- Feminisms and Business Ethics
- Finance and Business Ethics
- Global Issues and Business Ethics
- Human Resource Management and Development and Business Ethics
- Labour Relations and Business Ethics
- Law, Public Policy, and Business Ethics
- Leadership and Ethics: Philosophical Perspectives and Qualitative Analysis
- Leadership and Ethics: Quantitative Analysis
- Marketing Ethics
- Organisational Behaviour and Business Ethics
- Philosophy and Business Ethics
- Philosophy and Business Ethics
- Psychology and Business Ethics
- Religion, Spirituality and Business Ethics
- Small Business, Entrepreneurship and Business Ethics
- Social Entrepreneurship and Ethics
- Sociology and Business Ethics
- Strategy and Business Ethics
- Technology and Business Ethics

Descriptions and the names of the editors of each of these sections can be found on the Journal's website.

== Number of Volumes and Issues ==
The Journal Business Ethics publishes seven volumes per year with each volume made up of four issues, i.e., 28 issues per year. The journal also publishes four Special Issues per year. The full list of issues can be found at on the JBE's website.

== Abstracted and Indexed in ==
ABS Academic Journal Quality Guide ANVUR Australian Business Deans Council (ABDC) Journal Quality List BFI List Baidu CLOCKSS CNKI CNPIEC Current Contents / Social & Behavioral Sciences Dimensions EBSCO Book Review Digest Plus EBSCO Business Abstracts with Full Text EBSCO Business Source EBSCO Discovery Service EBSCO Education EBSCO Education Source EBSCO Health Business EBSCO Management Collection EBSCO Nonprofit Organization Reference Center EBSCO OmniFile ECONIS ERIH PLUS EconLit	Google Scholar JSTOR Journal Citation Reports/Social Sciences Edition Naver Norwegian Register for Scientific Journals and Series OCLC WorldCat Discovery Service PhilPapers Portico ProQuest ABI/INFORM ProQuest Art, Design and Architecture Collection ProQuest Arts & Humanities Database ProQuest Arts Premium Collection ProQuest-ExLibris Primo ProQuest-ExLibris Summon PsycINFO Research Papers in Economics (RePEc) SCImago SCOPUS Social Science Citation Index TD Net Discovery Service UGC-CARE List (India) Wanfang

== Impact Factor and Ranking ==
The Journal of Business Ethics has an impact factor of 6.3 and a five-year impact factor of 9.7 (2025).

In 2025, the Journal is ranked 3rd out of 77 journals in the category of "Ethics" and 42nd out of 317 journals in the category of "Business" by the Clarivate Journal Citation Reports® Ranking by Category.

== See also ==
- List of ethics journals
