= Markkula Center for Applied Ethics =

University department in Santa Clara, US

- Established: 1986
- Budget: $3.7 million
- Director: Don Heider
- Administrative staff: 25
- Location: Santa Clara, California, United States
- Website: www.scu.edu/ethics

The Markkula Center for Applied Ethics is a department at Jesuit Santa Clara University. It was created by Manuel Velasquez, a faculty member in the School of Business, and funded by early Apple Inc. investor Mike Markkula and his wife, Linda Markkula.

The Center offers programs in ten major fields of ethics.

== Focus areas ==
=== Bioethics ===
The Center partners with area hospitals and hospices, focusing on clinical ethics to develop policies on issues such as organ donation after cardiac death and artificial nutrition and hydration. Partner hospitals also provide internship opportunities in healthcare for undergraduates. The Center's bioethics research focuses on "Medical Decision Making for Publicly Conserved and Unrepresented Patients," "Culturally Competent Care," and "Pandemic Ethics," among other topics.

=== Business Ethics ===
The Business and Organizational Ethics Partnership brings together business executives and business ethics scholars from Santa Clara University and other Bay Area institutions. The partnership is a forum to develop the creation of ethical organizational cultures. The Markkula Center for Applied Ethics also offers programs on assessing the ethical culture of their organization for boards of directors.

=== Campus Ethics ===
Santa Clara University hosts over 70 faculty members specializing in Campus Ethics across various disciplines, from literature to engineering. The Markkula Center for Applied Ethics provides Hackworth Grants for faculty and students researching on applied ethics. Additionally, it offers Hackworth Fellowships for students keen on developing ethics programs for their peers. Through the Campus Ethics program, they arrange presentations on applied ethics in diverse fields like technology, diversity, immigration, and law.

=== Government Ethics ===
The focus on Government Ethics includes conflicts of interest, gifts and bribes, cronyism, lobbying, transparency, and the personal lives of public officials. The Center's Ethics Roundtable enables locally elected officials such as mayors, council people, county supervisors, and members of special districts to meet quarterly to discuss how these issues play out in their work.

=== Internet Ethics ===
With a special focus on privacy, Internet Ethics offers presentations and teaching modules on such topics as data, social media, the 'right to be forgotten,' cybersecurity, ethics in video games, search engines, and privacy by design.

=== Journalism & Media Ethics ===
The Journalism & Media Ethics focus area addresses the ethical implications of how journalistic 'gatekeeping' has changed in a digital era. It collaborates with journalists, editors, and technologists to help members of the public engage with journalists and journalists equip themselves with in-depth knowledge on complex issues they cover. It also assists stakeholders across the digital ecosystem in defusing the rapid spread of misinformation and disinformation that frequently disguises itself as news.

=== Leadership Ethics ===
The Leadership Ethics focus of the center collaborates with businesses, nonprofits, governments, and other organizations to analyze real-world issues in leadership ethics. Its goal is to develop programs and tools that address these issues effectively.

=== Religious and Catholic Ethics ===
The ethics center in a Jesuit university has a special interest in the role of religion in ethics and the formation of moral character. They offer dialogue, research, and curriculum across a wide range of religious traditions.

=== Technology Ethics ===
The Technology Ethics focus area examines issues in the ethics of emerging technologies, providing teaching resources for universities and corporations, and working with organizations such as the Partnership on AI. Particular areas of focus include AI ethics, space ethics, ethics of human enhancement and transhumanism, and global catastrophic and existential risk.

== Practical Applications ==
Between 1996 and 2001, the Earthquake Engineering Research Institute (EERI) used the systematic approach developed by the Markkula Center to develop 11 case studies related to earthquake risk.

In 2020, they formed a New Journalism and Media Ethics Council to address issues of "disinformation, misinformation, and the role journalism should play in polarized societies." In 2026, they authored a series of papers on the ethics of prediction markets.
