= Daryl Koehn =

American philosopher

- Born: November 5, 1955 (age 70)

Education
- Education: University of Chicago (BA, PhD), Northwestern University (MBA), Brasenose College, Oxford (MA)

Philosophical work
- Era: 21st-century philosophy
- Region: Western philosophy
- Institutions: DePaul University
- Main interests: ethics, corporate governance

Daryl Koehn (born November 5, 1955) is an American philosopher and the Wicklander Chair in Professional Ethics at DePaul University. She is the co-editor-in-chief of Business and Professional Ethics Journal and managing director of the Institute for Business and Professional Ethics. Koehn is known for her works on ethics and corporate governance.

== Books ==
- The Ground of Professional Ethics
- The Nature of Evil
- Rethinking Feminist Ethics
- Local Insights, Global Ethics For Business
- Living With the Dragon: Acting Ethically in a World of Unintended Consequences
- Aesthetics and Business Ethics (ed. along with Dawn Elm)
- Toward a New (Old) Theory of Responsibility
