= Business & Society =

- Discipline: Business
- Language: English
- Edited by: Andrew Crane, Irene Henriques, Bryan Husted, Frank de Bakker

Publication details
- History: 1960–present
- Publisher: SAGE Publications
- Frequency: 8/year
- Impact factor: 7.0 (2022)

Standard abbreviations
- ISO 4: Bus. Soc.

Indexing
- ISSN: 0007-6503 (print); 1552-4205 (web)
- LCCN: 89645991
- OCLC no.: 300172771

Links
- Journal homepage; Online access; Online archive

Business & Society is a peer-reviewed academic journal that covers the field of business. The journal's editors-in-chief are Andrew Crane (University of Bath), Irene Henriques (York University), Bryan Husted (Tecnológico de Monterrey), and Frank de Bakker (IÉSEG School of Management). It was established in 1960 and is published by SAGE Publications in association with International Association for Business and Society.

== Abstracting and indexing ==
The journal is abstracted and indexed in Scopus and the Social Sciences Citation Index. According to the Journal Citation Reports, its 2022 impact factor is 7.0.
