= Business Ethics Quarterly =

- Discipline: Business ethics
- Language: English
- Edited by: Bruce Barry

Publication details
- History: 1991–present
- Publisher: Cambridge University Press (United States)
- Frequency: Quarterly
- Impact factor: 5.988 (2020)

Standard abbreviations
- ISO 4: Bus. Ethics Q.

Indexing
- ISSN: 1052-150X (print); 2153-3326 (web)
- LCCN: 93-648250
- JSTOR: 1052150X
- OCLC no.: 38554432

Links
- Journal homepage

Business Ethics Quarterly is a peer-reviewed academic journal that publishes theoretical and empirical research relevant to all aspects of business ethics. It publishes articles and reviews on a broad range of topics, including the internal ethics of business organizations, the role of business organizations in larger social, political, and cultural frameworks, and the ethical quality of market-based societies and market-based relationships. Business Ethics Quarterly is the official journal of the Society for Business Ethics and is published on a non-profit basis by the Cambridge University Press. The editor-in-chief are Frank den Hond, (Hanken School of Economics) and Mollie Painter, (Nottingham Trent University).

In November 2024, Business Ethics Quarterly was downgraded on Academic Journal Guide (AJG) from the Chartered Association of Business Schools (CABS) list, going from an ABS 4 to an ABS 3.

== Abstracting and indexing ==
The journal is abstracted and indexed by:

- ABI/INFORM
- ATLA Religion Database
- Business ASAP
- Business Source
- Business & Corporate Resource Center
- Business Periodicals Index
- Corporate ResourceNet
- Dow Jones Insight
- Emerald Reviews
- Index Philosophicus
- International Bibliography of the Social Sciences
- MEDLINE
- PAIS International
- Philosopher's Index
- Philosophy Research Index
- PhilPapers
- ProQuest Social Science Journals
- Public Affairs Index
- Scopus
- Social Sciences Citation Index
- Wilson Business Abstracts

According to the Journal Citation Reports, the journal has a 2020 2-year impact factor of 3.719, ranking it 6th out of 54 journals in the category "Ethics" and 85th of 153 journals in the category "business".

== See also ==
- List of ethics journals
