= Benjamin Bradley =

Benjamin Bradley may refer to:

- Benjamin Bradley (inventor) (1830–1904), American inventor
- Benjamin Franklin Bradley (1825–1897), politician in the Confederate States of America
- Benjamin Francis Bradley (1898–1957), British communist union leader
- Ben Bradley (politician) (born 1989), British Conservative Party politician
- Ben Bradley (Hollyoaks), a fictional character from the British soap Hollyoaks
- Ben Bradley (philosopher) (born 1971), American philosopher

== See also ==
- Ben Bradlee (1921–2014), Washington Post editor
- Ben Bradlee Jr. (born 1948), Boston Globe journalist and editor, son of Ben Bradlee
- Benjamin Braidley (1792–1845), English writer
