= Ergo =

Ergo may refer to:

- ergō, a Latin word meaning "therefore", as in cōgitō ergō sum
- Ergo (journal), an academic journal
- A Greek word έργο meaning "work", used as a prefix ergo-, for example, in ergonomics.
- Ergometer (rowing), an indoor rowing machine
- Campagnolo ErgoPower, in cycling
- Ergo (Indian newspaper)
- Ergo Proxy, an anime television series
- Ergo, a fictional planet in the Star Wars franchise
- ERGO Group, insurance companies owned by Munich Re
- Engelbert Ergo, a Flemish Baroque painter

== See also ==
- Urgo, a surname
