= The Oxford Handbook of Philosophy of Death =

- First edition
- Author: Ben Bradley, Fred Feldman and Jens Johansson (editors)
- Language: English
- Subject: philosophy of death
- Publisher: Oxford University Press
- Publication date: 2013
- Media type: Print
- Pages: 493
- ISBN: 9780195388923

The Oxford Handbook of Philosophy of Death is a 2013 book edited by Ben Bradley, Fred Feldman and Jens Johansson in which the authors explore philosophical aspects of death.

== Reception ==
The book was reviewed by James Stacey Taylor, Subhasis Chattopadhyay, and Mark Alfano.
