= 1990 Delta Pride strike =

1990 labor strike in Mississippi

- Part of the post–civil rights era in African-American history
- Date: September 12 or 13 – December 14, 1990 (Note: Sources vary on when the strike began, with most sources giving the date as either September 12 or September 13. In a 1992 book, journalist Richard Schweid said that the walkout occurred on September 7.) (Either 3 months and 2 days or 3 months and 1 day)
- Location: Sunflower County, Mississippi, United States (Note: The strike affected Delta Pride's primary facility in Indianola, as well as another plant in Inverness.)
- Caused by: Low wages and poor working conditions
- Goals: Increased wages and improved working conditions
- Methods: Boycott; Picketing; Strike action; Walkout
- Result: Union ratifies a new labor contract that included higher wages than initially offered by the company and changes to several company policies

Parties
United Food and Commercial Workers Local 1529	Delta Pride (Note: The name of the company differs between sources. Given names include "Delta Pride Catfish Company", "Delta Pride Catfish, Inc." "Delta Catfish Processors, Inc.", and simply "Delta Pride Catfish".)

Workers for Delta Pride, a catfish processing company based in Indianola, Mississippi, United States, went on strike from mid-September to mid-December 1990. The strike ended when the labor union representing the workers signed a contract that provided for wage increases and improved working conditions.

By the 1980s, aquaculture of catfish in Mississippi had become a multi-million-dollar industry, centered primarily in the Mississippi Delta region of the state. Delta Pride, a cooperative operated by over a hundred catfish farmers in the region, was the largest processor of catfish. It operated its main facility in Indianola and employed over 1,000 people. While many of the company's supervisors were white Americans, the overwhelming majority of its workforce were African Americans, particularly black women. In the mid-1980s, these employees unionized with the United Food and Commercial Workers. The primary motives behind unionizing were the low wages—typically less than a dollar above than the federal minimum wage—and the poor working conditions, with some employees comparing the work environment to that of the plantation complexes in the Southern United States. Of notable issue was the company's restroom policy, which limited workers to six restroom visits per week, with time limits of five minutes per visit. In mid-1990, the labor contract between the company and the union expired, and negotiations on a replacement contract were fruitless, with the union requesting higher wages and changes to company policies, including the restroom policy.

On either September 12 or 13, 1990, several hundred employees went on strike with a walkout. Picketing commenced and the union launched a nationwide boycott of Delta Pride products. Strike leaders attempted to frame the strike as a dispute over civil rights, and the strikers received considerable support from civil rights organizations, such as the NAACP, Operation PUSH, and the Southern Christian Leadership Conference. Additionally, many notable activists visited Indianola during the strike, including Bill Clay, Dick Gregory, and Jesse Jackson. While the company was able to hire a large number of replacement workers and stayed in operation during the strike, it experienced a number of setbacks that eventually led it to resume negotiations with the union. These included a souring public reputation and an incident where two company shareholders had attempted to bribe a member of the union's bargaining committee. By mid-December, negotiations had resumed, and on December 14, a new contract was ratified, ending the strike.

The strike is considered the largest by African Americans in the state's history, and at least one historian—Marcia Walker-McWilliams—has called it the largest in Mississippi history. Per the terms of the contract, workers received wages in excess of those initially offered by the company. In addition, the previously striking employees were rehired. Concerning other agreements, the contract saw an increase in holidays, an end to the company's restrictions on restroom access, and the creation of a health and safety committee, among other things.

== Background ==
=== Catfish industry in Mississippi ===
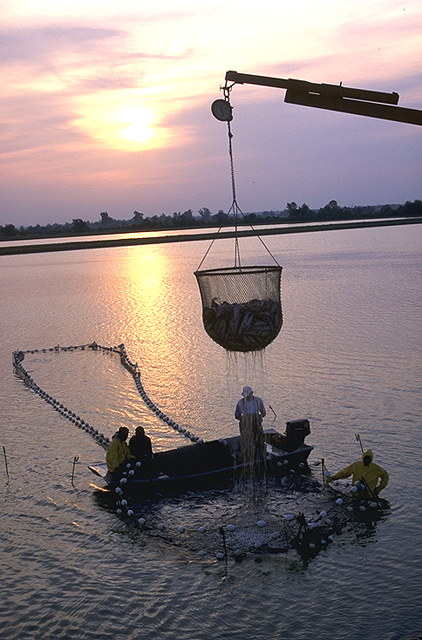
Workers harvesting catfish at a fish farm in Mississippi

In the 1980s, the U.S. state of Mississippi was a center for the aquaculture of catfish. In a 1988 article, The New York Times reported that "Mississippi is the source of 80 to 85 percent of the catfish grown and processed annually". (Note: The New York Times did not specify as to whether this figure applied to the catfish industry of the United States or to the worldwide catfish industry.) This growth coincided with a growing culinary popularity of catfish in the United States. Between 1978 and 1987, the amount of farm-raised catfish meat processed in the United States rose from 22 million pounds (10 million kilograms) to 280 million lb (130 million kg), with a statistician for the United States Department of Agriculture saying that the amount was roughly doubling every three years. That year, sales of catfish exceeded $300 million (equivalent to $850 million in 2025). By 1990, 37 plants had been built in the state to process the fish into meat, and approximately 6,000 Mississippians were employed in the industry. A majority of both these plants and the workers were located in the state's Mississippi Delta, a region in the western part of the state located between the Mississippi River to the west and the Yazoo River to the east. By 1990, this region had become the most productive in the United States for catfish production and processing.

Geologically, the Delta benefitted from the clay content of its soil and its shallow aquifers, which allowed for the creation of ponds needed for the raising of catfish. While catfish farming operations in the Delta had begun in the 1960s, the industry experienced a boom in the 1980s. This was due in part to increased mechanization in the cotton industry—historically one of the largest industries in the Delta—which caused an uptick in unemployment and created a large labor pool to work in the catfish industry. Additionally, many farmers who traditionally grew either cotton or soybeans began raising catfish. Workers were also attracted to the industry due to the wages, which were considered higher on average than other industries in the region. In 1988, the average hourly wage for someone working in catfish processing was about $4 ($10.89 in 2025). The workforce for the catfish industry, as well as the overall population of the Delta region during this time, was largely African American.

=== Delta Pride ===
Indianola in Sunflower County, Mississippi

In the late 1980s, the largest producer of processed catfish meat was Delta Pride. The company, which was founded by Samuel Hinote in 1981, was a cooperative owned by over a hundred catfish farmers in the region. (Note: Sources vary on the number of farmers who were involved in the Delta Pride cooperative. A 1987 report by United Press International gave a figure of 167. However, in a 1988 article for The New York Times, Ronald Smothers stated that the cooperative was owned by 168 farmers. Later, in 1990, Peter T. Kilborn wrote in an article for The New York Times that 155 farmers were involved. That same year, Donna St. George reported in The Seattle Times that the cooperative was owned by 180 farmers, a number echoed by Peter Schweid of the Los Angeles Times. A 2001 book that discusses the strike states that the cooperative was owned by 178 farmers.) Under the arrangement, the fish farmers would sell their fish to Delta Pride and share the profits received by the cooperative. Concerning the company's size and prominence, The New York Times called it the "industry wage leader" and the "General Motors" of catfish processing. In 1987, the company operated three plants, with its main facility in Indianola, a city in the Delta that had a population of around 8,000. In 1987, the company, which employed over 1,000 people, (Note: Sources vary on the size of the Delta Pride workforce in 1987. The United Press International stated that the company employed "nearly 1,500 employees", while Ronald Smothers of The New York Times reported that the company employed "nearly 2,000 people".) processed approximately 100 million lb (45 million kg) of fish. By 1990, catfish production had become the largest industry in the city, and Delta Pride was the single largest employer in Sunflower County. The number of manufacturing jobs in the county had roughly doubled between 1980 and 1987, largely because of the catfish industry, and the county also had an unemployment rate of 11.9 percent, which was lower than the surrounding area.

=== Unionization efforts ===
In late 1985, the United Food and Commercial Workers (UFCW)—a 1.6-million-member labor union that was the largest affiliate of the AFL-CIO—mailed 100,000 cards to residents of the Delta, requesting that the recipients fill out and mail the cards to UFCW Local 1529 in Memphis, Tennessee, if they were interested in seeking union representation. According to a director for the UFCW, the local union received a large number of responses from workers in the region's catfish industry, prompting the union to initiate a unionization drive. Union organizer Bobby Moses oversaw the drive, which was headquartered in Greenwood, Mississippi, and specifically targeted Delta Pride. As part of their efforts, the union reached out to local black churches and black businesses for support, and the Mississippi chapter of the NAACP also supported the union drive. The union also worked with Black Workers for Justice, which supported the effort. In response, the company hired the New Orleans-based law firm of Kullman, Inman, Bee & Downing, to assist in advocating against unionization. The National Labor Relations Board (NLRB), based on complaints from the union, accused the company of firing pro-union workers, making threats, and conducting surveillance, though the company denied these charges.

==== Issues expressed by Delta Pride employees ====
===== Working conditions =====
According to United Press International, which interviewed several workers in 1987, the main issue expressed by Delta Pride employees was the way in which they were treated by their supervisors. Sarah White, who worked as a skinner for Delta Pride in the 1980s, said that the company's management would fire workers "for any reason, just because they didn't like your attitude, or if you talked back at them". According to White, several workers were fired for being pregnant or sick. Workers could also be fired for being too slow, with supervisors often timing employees at their tasks with a stopwatch. Some workers at the plant complained of having to stand in fish entrails for several hours straight. Additionally, multiple employees stated that they had experienced eye, throat, and skin irritation due to the high level of ammonia in the plant's water supply. Repetitive strain injuries were also reported, with at least one employee having developed carpal tunnel syndrome. Due to the high levels of poverty and unemployment in the Delta, replacement workers for fired employees were often readily available.

One of the largest points of contention between the workers and company management concerned access to restrooms. Restroom visits were rationed, with employees allowed only six five-minute restroom breaks per week, in addition to their thirty-minute lunch break and two other fifteen-minute breaks. Per some employees, women workers needed to get permission before going to the restrooms and were often followed by their supervisors. Their visits were timed, with supervisors banging on the restroom door after five minutes. Additionally, the stalls lacked individual doors. The penalty for three violations of this restroom policy was often the loss of a days' work, and three additional violations often resulted in firing. According to historians Angela Boswell and Judith N. McArthur, the restroom policy was the "tipping point" towards eventual labor action.

In the Mississippi Delta, commercial catfish farming has replaced cotton culture, but although the "crop" is different, it is still harvested and processed by black laborers for powerful white landowners. The region's economic transformation has changed, without improving, African American women's work lives: assembly-line jobs skinning and gutting catfish under the scrutiny of white supervisors with stopwatches have replaced field labor under white overseers.

— Historians Angela Boswell and Judith N. McArthur, 2006

Numerous employees and commentators have compared the work environment at Delta Pride to those of the plantation complexes in the Southern United States. Aaron Henry, the president of the Mississippi branch of the NAACP, said in 1990 that the employees' anger towards Delta Pride was driven by "a combination of race and economics, coupled with the philosophy of the plantation", while Dick Stevens, the president of another catfish company based in Isola, Mississippi, said, "I don't think there's any doubt about the plantation mentality around here". This comparison was also highlighted by the fact that, while most of the employees were black women, most of the management was made up of white people. Additionally, some workers said that there were rumors that white male supervisors gave sexual favors of better wages or positions to female workers.

===== Wages =====
In a 1992 book, historian James C. Cobb stated that the primary reason workers expressed for unionizing was "the desire for better wages and working conditions". Concerning this former part, Peter T. Kilborn of The New York Times stated that the average worker at Delta Pride in 1990 was earning an hourly pay of $4.05 ($9.98 in 2025), compared to the federal minimum wage of $3.80 ($9.36 in 2025). At this rate, the average full-time worker made an average yearly income of $8,424 ($20,760 in 2025), which was below the poverty threshold of $12,675 ($31,236 in 2025) established by the federal government for a single parent of three children. However, the union stated that this figure was inaccurate and that the actual average hourly pay for a Delta Pride worker was only $3.90 ($9.61 in 2025). At the time, most of the employees of Delta Pride were single parents. Industry-wide, the average pay was slightly below $4 ($9.86 in 2025) per hour. At Delta Pride, the company assisted workers in applying for welfare programs. White also stated that there had been some instances where workers on the first shift would arrive at 8 a.m. but not be allowed to clock in until catfish arrived at the plant, which sometimes occurred several hours later. Per White, there had been several times when workers were physically present at the plant for eight hours but were only paid for three hours of work.

==== Unionization vote ====
In October 1986, workers at Delta Pride unionized with the UFCW, with a vote of 489 in favor and 349 against. A day prior to the vote, in an attempt to sway the workers against unionization, Delta Pride gave workers time off to attend a company-hosted barbecue where a pile of $182,000 ($535,000 in 2025)—representing the amount the company said workers would lose annually in union dues—was on display. Despite this, the union drive, which was largely led by black women including White, Margaret Hollins, Rose Turner, and Mary Young, succeeded, with the employees of Delta Pride becoming unionized under UFCW Local 1529. Speaking of the successful drive, Cleve McDowell, a field director for the NAACP in Mississippi, told The Washington Post,

This is the beginning of a second era of civil rights for us here. We are going past public accommodations and the right to vote and looking at economic power.

On June 29, 1987, the first labor contract between the union and the company went into effect. The contract would run for three years, expiring in mid-1990. At the time, Hinote was still involved in the company, serving as its president.

=== Issues facing the industry in the late 1980s / early 1990s ===
While there had been 37 catfish processing plants in operation in Mississippi during the 1980s, three of these had closed by 1990. In the 1980s, the industry had instituted a form of price fixing in which processing plants agreed to pay farmers $0.80 ($1.97 in 2025) per pound of fish, which cost farmers approximately $0.70 ($1.73 in 2025) to raise. However, this price fixing ultimately hurt many farmers due to their stakes in the processing cooperatives. Speaking in 1990, Larry W. Joiner (then-president and chief executive officer of Delta Pride) said, "From a processing standpoint, the industry is sick. Processors are selling for less than their cost of production." From 1988 to 1990, Delta Pride, which employed about 1,000 individuals, (Note: Sources vary on the exact number of individuals employed by the company during this time. In an October 1990 article, the Los Angeles Times stated that the company employed about 1,085 workers at two plants in Indianola. However, in a March 1990 article for the newspaper, journalist Lee May said that the Indianola plant employed 921 employees, while journalist Peter T. Kilborn said in a December 1990 article for The New York Times that the company employed about 1,200 individuals in September of that year.) failed to generate a profit. In 1989, this was in spite of roughly $144 million ($374 million in 2025) in sales. As early as 1988, Delta Pride was trying to mechanize the filleting process at their Indianola plant, though this was limited due to the technology available at the time. (Note: In 1988, The New York Times reported that Delta Pride had installed several filleting machines that could process 40 fish per minute, compared to five fish per minute processed by humans. However, the machines could not process fish larger than 28 ounces (0.79 kg) and required additional inspections and processing from humans.)

=== Contract negotiations in 1990 ===
In July 1990, the labor contract between the company and union expired, with the two sides negotiating on the terms of a new labor contract. According to historian Kieran W. Taylor, the company aimed to stall these negotiations, with the goal of breaking the local union. According to the Los Angeles Times, the company and union disagreed over the terms of the new contract, with the company offering hourly pay raises of between $0.35 and $0.90 ($0.86 and $2.22 in 2025). The union, however, requested higher wage increases, as well as improvements to the company's pension plan and the creation of a committee for workers' health and safety. Per the union, because of an increase in the federal hourly minimum wage to $4.25 ($10.05 in 2025) that was to take effect on April 1, 1991, the company's offer would only equate to an hourly increase of about 6.2¢ ($0.15 in 2025) per hour over what they would legally be required to pay.

Per the Associated Press, the workers were equally concerned about wages as they were about working conditions, with the news agency reporting that workers had complained of high incidents of injuries, being timed by supervisors, and the company's poor restroom policy. Concerning the injuries, in December 1989, the Occupational Safety and Health Administration of the United States Department of Labor had fined Delta Pride $32,800 ($85,200 in 2025) for workplace health and safety violations that the department said had resulted in workplace injuries. While the company contested the fine, it also hired consultants to help institute changes intended to prevent further injuries. Concerning the restrooms, the company's proposal included a maximum of six restroom breaks per week, which the union rejected, instead seeking an end to the restrictions on restroom breaks. According to White, in response, the company proposed adding five minutes to the employees' lunch break and requiring restroom visits to be made during that time.

After several weeks of negotiations, the company made its final offer to the union in late August 1990. According to Richard Schweid of the Los Angeles Times, this offer included an hourly wage increase of 6.5¢ ($0.16 in 2025) per year for each of the three years that the contract would be in place. However, the union rejected this proposal in early September, (Note: Sources vary on the exact date that the union rejected the company's proposal, with September 7 and September 10 both given.) with members voting 410 against and 5 in favor of accepting the deal. Following the rejection, Delta Pride refused to engage in further negotiations with the union.

== Course of the strike ==
=== Walkout ===
On either September 12 or 13, Delta Pride workers initiated a labor strike, which began with a walkout involving about 900 employees. (Note: Sources vary on the number of strikers involved in the initial walkout. While the most commonly reported number is 900, other reported values include 500, 1,000, and 1,200. In a 1990 article, United Press International stated that the union contract would affect about 1,200 employees.) The strike affected Delta Pride's facilities in Indianola and Inverness, while two other plants operated by the company were unaffected. Strikers received a weekly strike pay of $60 ($148 in 2025), in addition to a 50 lb (23 kg) ration of beans, peas, and rice provided by the union. In response, the company hired strikebreakers to replace the workers, with many hired from Cleveland and Greenville. Commenting on this, a spokesperson for the union said that the replacement workers were willing to cross the strikers' picket line because they lived in areas that had unemployment rates of about 20 percent. By October 8, a spokesperson for Delta Pride said that the company's workforce was roughly 80 percent of what it had been pre-strike, and that over 200 union members had left the union and returned to work.

=== Boycott and support from civil rights organizations ===
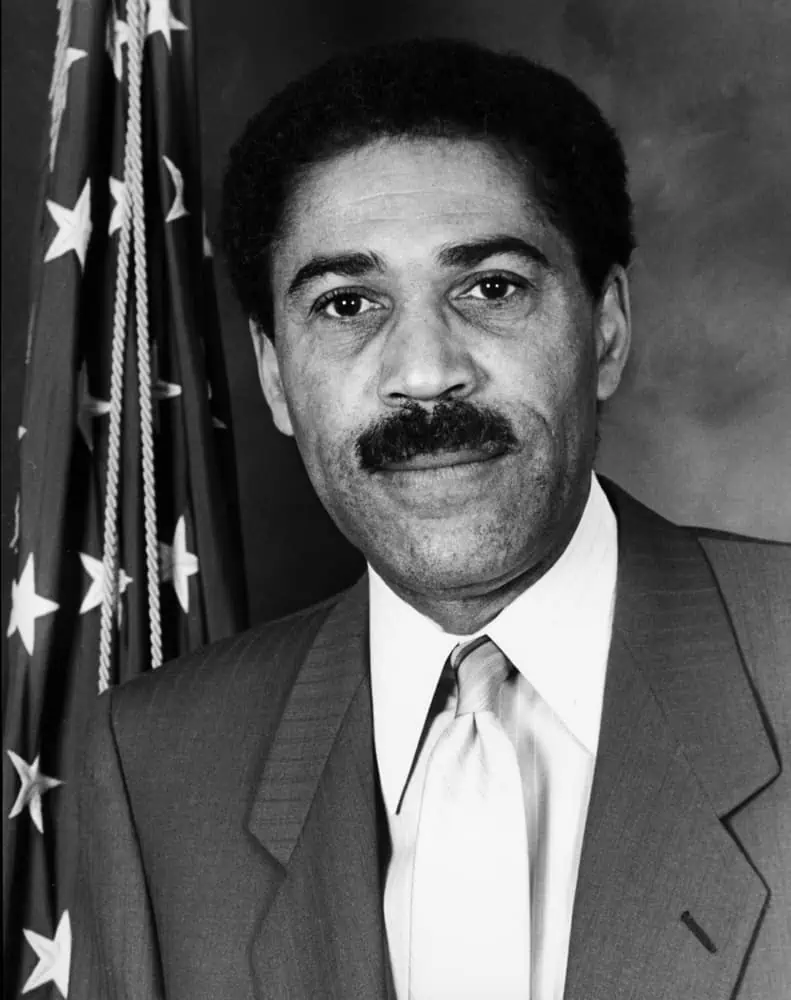
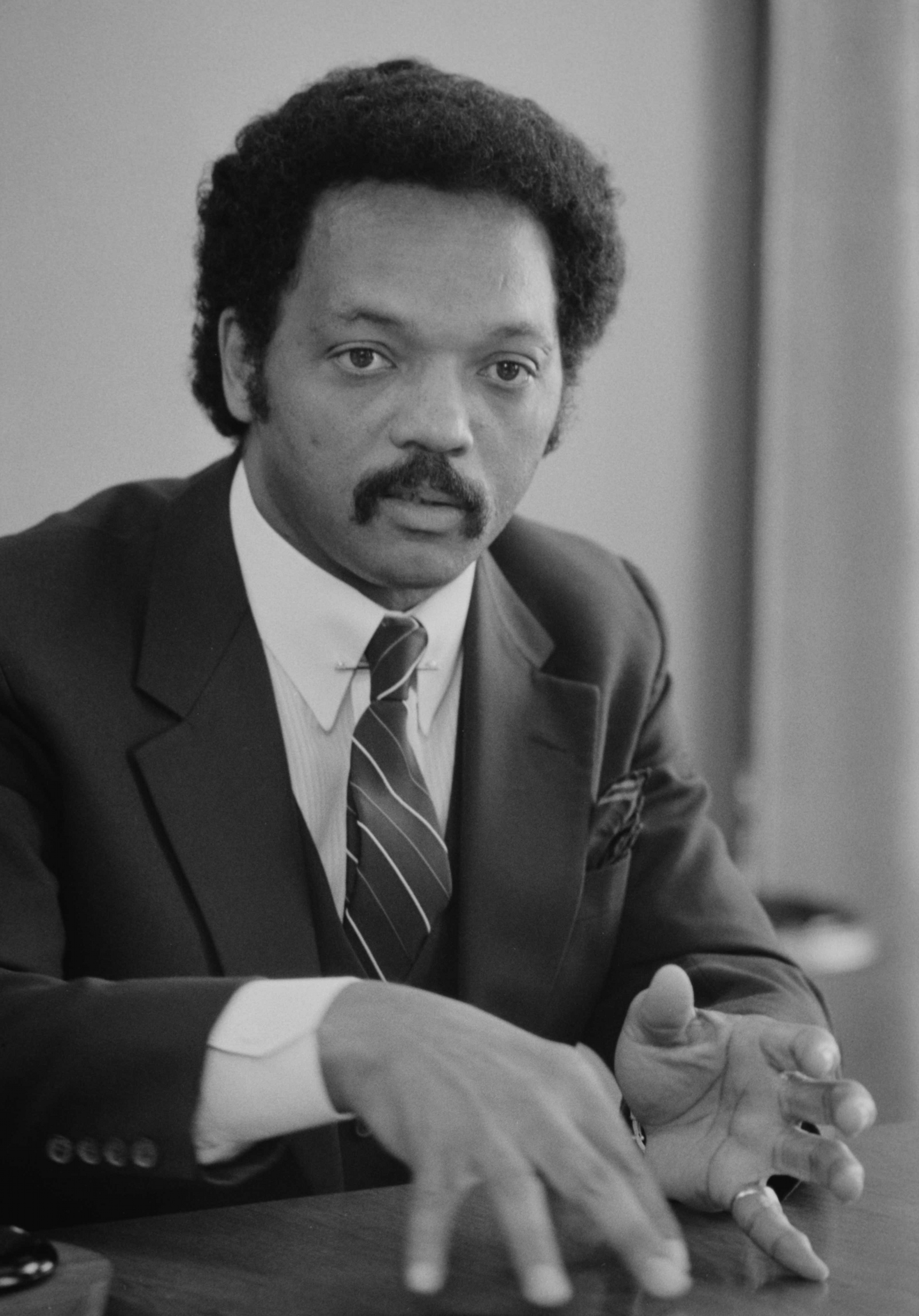
During the strike, several civil rights activists, including Bill Clay (left) and Jesse Jackson, visited Indianola to express their support for the strikers.

Strike leaders, including White, attempted to garner support for their side by framing the labor dispute as a fight over civil rights. The AFL-CIO led a nationwide boycott of Delta Pride products, which received support from civil rights organizations, such as the NAACP, the Southern Christian Leadership Conference (SCLC), and Operation PUSH. According to Schweid, the boycott caused concern among other catfish processors in the region, as they feared that consumers might boycott catfish in general instead of Delta Pride-processed catfish specifically. The boycott was especially concerning for the industry because African Americans, especially Black Southerners, constituted a large percentage of catfish consumers in the United States. To support the boycott, White and Rose Turner (another striker) traveled across the United States and delivered an address before a hearing of the Congressional Black Caucus in Washington, D.C. The caucus attempted to bring greater attention to the strike, with Bill Clay—a member of the caucus who represented Missouri in the House of Representatives as a member of the Democratic Party—traveling to Indianola to hear testimony from strikers. Other famous individuals who visited Indianola during the strike included civil rights activists Dick Gregory, Jesse Jackson, Martin Luther King III, Rosa Parks, and SCLC president Joseph Lowery. By November, multiple grocery store chains, including A&P and AppleTree Markets, had committed to stop selling Delta Pride products. However, Winn-Dixie—the single-largest buyer of Delta Pride products—had not, prompting a targeted campaign from the SCLC that included protests and rallies outside of Winn-Dixie locations. Despite this, Winn-Dixie stated that they would not cease selling Delta Pride catfish, citing a company policy regarding involvement in labor disputes experienced by their suppliers.

=== Later developments ===
In early November, a federal grand jury indicted two shareholders in Delta Pride for attempting to bribe a member of the union's bargaining committee. Specifically, they had offered the individual $5,000 ($12,322 in 2025) in exchange for speaking out in favor of ending the strike. This was one of a series of events that damaged the company's reputation during the strike. Around the same time, several Delta Pride officials were cited by the NLRB for threatening picketing employees and for encouraging their employees to leave the union. The company also suffered from an episode of Today on NBC that discussed the strike. The episode featured an interview with Delta Pride's chairman, Turner Arant, who gave a tour of his large catfish farm and home. This contrasted with an interview of a striker who spoke of how difficult it was to support her family of eight children with her current wages. The interview prompted Arant to resign. By December, there had been several instances of violence on the picket line, including several instances of gunfire and a police officer beating a striker. Roughly 20 picketers were arrested during the strike.

On December 10, federal mediators announced that they were planning to hold negotiations between the company and union the following day. These negotiations ended on December 12, with the two sides reaching a tentative agreement on the terms of a new labor contract. On December 14, (Note: Most sources state that the vote to approve the tentative agreement occurred on December 14. However, in the 2017 book The Mississippi Encyclopedia, historian Kieran W. Taylor stated that the vote occurred on December 13.) the union workers voted overwhelmingly to approve the contract, bringing the strike to an end. (Note: Sources vary on the results of the vote. A contemporary report from United Press International states that union workers voted 399 in favor and 1 against, while historian Kieran W. Taylor said in a 2017 book that the result was 479 in favor and 1 against.) In total, the strike lasted about 13 weeks.

== Aftermath ==
=== Terms of the new labor contract ===
The new labor contract agreed upon by the union and company would cover about 1,200 workers and run for 34 months. Per the terms of the contract, previously striking employees would be rehired. Concerning wages, employees who had been with the company for at least one year would receive an hourly pay increase of 60¢ ($1.48 in 2025). Over the term of the contract, the employees would receive raises of between 65¢ and 85¢ ($1.6 and $2.09 in 2025). Additional wage increases were granted to workers in specific areas of the plant who had met specific seniority levels, and double pay was instituted for employees on their seventh consecutive day of work. On average, the hourly wage increase after the strike was approximately 85¢. Concerning changes to the workplace, the company agreed to create a health and safety committee which would include workers in its ranks. Additionally, the company ended its restrictions on restroom access. Among other policy changes, the company agreed to give workers an additional 10-minute break after 10 hours of work, guaranteed union representatives unlimited access to break areas and access to other areas in the plant in order to investigate grievances, and agreed to conduct drug testing only after an accident had occurred. Workers also received increased vacation time, as well as Memorial Day and Martin Luther King Jr. Day as holidays.

=== Historical significance and later history ===
Multiple sources have called the strike the largest involving African American workers in the history of Mississippi, while historian Marcia Walker-McWilliams stated in a 2016 book that it was the largest strike in Mississippi history. The strike received national attention, with journalist Vanessa Tait saying it was "one of the most watched southern union battles in decades". The end of the strike came amidst a period of declining sales for catfish in the United States, and the industry experienced some austerity that aimed to address the issue of oversaturation that had become prevalent in the late 1980s. Additionally, the industry began to face increased competition from foreign producers, resulting in layoffs at Delta Pride. In June 2003, White gave a firsthand account of the strike in a speech at the Sixth Southern Conference on Women's History in Athens, Georgia, which was sponsored by the Southern Association for Women Historians. In 2007, it was reported that Alicia Keys had become involved in the possible production of a movie based on the strike.

== See also ==
- List of US strikes by size

== Sources ==
- "Catfish Plant Strikers Reach Tentative Pact". The New York Times. Associated Press. December 14, 1990a. p. 23. ISSN 0362-4331. OCLC 1645522. Archived from the original on January 4, 2025.
- "Pact Approved at Delta Pride". The New York Times. Associated Press. December 16, 1990b. p. 38. ISSN 0362-4331. OCLC 1645522. Archived from the original on January 4, 2025.
- Boswell, Angela; McArthur, Judith N. (2006). "Editors' Introduction". In Boswell, Angela; McArthur, Judith N. (eds.). Women Shaping the South: Creating and Confronting Change. Columbia, Missouri: University of Missouri Press. pp. 1–6. ISBN 978-0-8262-6486-2. OCLC 70688234.
- Broadway, Michael J. (1995). "From City to Countryside: Recent Changes in the Structure and Location of the Meat- and Fish-Processing Industries". In Stull, Donald D.; Broadway, Michael J.; Griffith, David (eds.). Any Way You Cut it: Meat Processing and Small-Town America. Lawrence, Kansas: University Press of Kansas. pp. 17–40. ISBN 978-0-7006-0721-1. OCLC 32589807.
- "Mississippi Strike Takes on Civil Rights Character". Chicago Tribune. August 10, 2021a [October 1, 1990]. ISSN 1085-6706. OCLC 7960243. Archived from the original on October 5, 2025.
- "PUSH boycotts catfish firm: Operation PUSH announced...". Chicago Tribune. August 10, 2021b [October 20, 1990]. ISSN 1085-6706. OCLC 7960243. Archived from the original on October 5, 2025.
- "Catfish Processors, Firm Schedule Negotiations". Chicago Tribune. August 10, 2021c [December 11, 1990]. ISSN 1085-6706. OCLC 7960243. Archived from the original on October 5, 2025.
- "Racially Tinged Delta Pride Strike Settled after 3 Months". Chicago Tribune. August 10, 2021d [December 14, 1990]. ISSN 1085-6706. OCLC 7960243. Archived from the original on October 5, 2025.
- Cobb, James C. (1992). The Most Southern Place on Earth: The Mississippi Delta and the Roots of Regional Identity. Oxford: Oxford University Press. ISBN 978-0-19-976243-9. OCLC 25009201.
- Green, Laurie Beth; Rycenga, Jennifer (2001) [2000]. ""A Struggle of the Mind": Black Working-Class Women's Organizing in Memphis and the Mississippi Delta, 1960s to 1990s". In Waller, Marguerite R.; Rycenga, Jennifer (eds.). Frontline Feminisms: Women, War, and Resistance (1st Paperback ed.). New York City: Routledge. pp. 395–416. ISBN 978-1-135-95454-3. OCLC 57190265.
- Hanson, Terry (2017). "Catfish Farming". In Ownby, Ted; Wilson, Charles Reagan; Abadie, Ann J.; Lindsey, Odie; Thomas, James G. Jr. (eds.). The Mississippi Encyclopedia. Sponsored by the Center for the Study of Southern Culture at the University of Mississippi. Jackson, Mississippi: University Press of Mississippi. pp. 184–185. ISBN 978-1-4968-1159-2. OCLC 959373243.
- Holley, William H. Jr.; Jennings, Kenneth M. (1994). "Institutional Issues: Managerial Rights, Union Security, and the Rights of Minority and Female Employees". The Labor Relations Process (5th ed.). Fort Worth, Texas: Dryden Press. pp. 392–420. ISBN 978-0-03-097576-9. OCLC 31435765.
- Ivins, Molly; Dubose, Lou (2004) [2003]. Bushwhacked: Life in George W. Bush's America (1st Vintage Books ed.). New York City: Vintage Books. ISBN 978-1-4000-9535-3. OCLC 1159422197.
- Josey, Imani (July 30, 2007). "Alicia Keys to Produce New Film". Jet. 112 (4). Chicago: Johnson Publishing Company: 31. ISSN 0021-5996. OCLC 1781708.
- Kilborn, Peter T. (December 10, 1990). "Charges of Exploitation Roil a Catfish Plant". The New York Times. p. 1. ISSN 0362-4331. OCLC 1645522. Archived from the original on December 4, 2023.
- "P.M. Briefting: Catfish on Move Despite Strike". Los Angeles Times. October 8, 1990. ISSN 0458-3035. OCLC 3638237. Archived from the original on October 4, 2025.
- May, Lee (March 25, 1990a). "Southern Catfish Workers Charge They're Being Crippled by Their Jobs". Los Angeles Times. ISSN 0458-3035. OCLC 3638237. Archived from the original on October 4, 2025.
- May, Lee (November 10, 1990b). "Striking Catfish Processors Boycott Big Grocery Chain". Los Angeles Times. ISSN 0458-3035. OCLC 3638237. Archived from the original on October 4, 2025.
- "Developments in industrial relations". Monthly Labor Review. 114 (3). Washington, D.C.: Bureau of Labor Statistics: 39–41. March 1991. ISSN 0098-1818. JSTOR 00981818. OCLC 958653658.
- Moye, J. Todd (2004). Let the People Decide: Black Freedom and White Resistance Movements in Sunflower County, Mississippi, 1945–1986. Chapel Hill, North Carolina: University of North Carolina Press. ISBN 978-0-8078-7670-1. OCLC 65181294.
- O'Reilly, Nancy D. (2019). "Define Each Other as Leaders". In This Together: How Successful Women Support Each Other in Work and Life (First Adams Media hardcover ed.). Avon, Massachusetts: Adams Media. pp. 69–92. ISBN 978-1-5072-0885-4. OCLC 1055266600.
- Penn, William H. Sr. (January 1991). "NAACP Battlefront". The Crisis. 98 (1). Baltimore: NAACP: 28–29, 38. ISSN 1559-1573. OCLC 77079334.
- Schwartzman, Kathleen C. (2013). The Chicken Trail: Following Workers, Migrants, and Corporations across the Americas. Ithaca, New York: ILR Press. ISBN 978-0-8014-6804-9. OCLC 829387577.
- Schweid, Richard (November 18, 1990). "Delta Strike: Civil Rights or Just Plain Economics?". Los Angeles Times. ISSN 0458-3035. OCLC 3638237. Archived from the original on October 4, 2025.
- Schweid, Richard (1992). Catfish and the Delta: Confederate Fish Farming in the Mississippi Delta. Berkeley, California: Ten Speed Press. ISBN 978-0-89815-454-2. OCLC 24626784.
- Smothers, Ronald (May 21, 1988). "Fish Tale: Mississippi To Moscow". The New York Times. p. 6. ISSN 0362-4331. OCLC 1645522. Archived from the original on February 1, 2018.
- St. George, Donna (December 2, 1990). "More Than Money at Root of Catfish-Worker Strike". The Seattle Times. ISSN 0745-9696. OCLC 9198928. Archived from the original on October 5, 2025.
- Tait, Vanessa (2016) [2005]. ""Organizing Where We Live and Work": The Independent Workers' Center Movement". Poor Workers' Unions: Rebuilding Labor from Below (Updated and Revised 2nd ed.). Chicago: Haymarket Books. pp. 123–158. ISBN 978-1-60846-520-0. OCLC 949931546.
- Taylor, Kieran W. (2017). "Delta Pride Catfish Worker's Strike". In Ownby, Ted; Wilson, Charles Reagan; Abadie, Ann J.; Lindsey, Odie; Thomas, James G. Jr. (eds.). The Mississippi Encyclopedia. Sponsored by the Center for the Study of Southern Culture at the University of Mississippi. Jackson, Mississippi: University Press of Mississippi. pp. 335–336. ISBN 978-1-4968-1159-2. OCLC 959373243.
- "Mississippi food workers". United Press International. September 6, 1987.
- "Delta Pride-union reach tentative agreement". United Press International. December 13, 1990a.
- "Strikers okay pact with Delta Pride". United Press International. December 14, 1990b.
- "Equality of Economic Opportunity". Racial and Ethnic Tensions in American Communities: Poverty, Inequality, and Discrimination (Report). Vol. VII: The Mississippi Delta Report. Washington, D.C.: United States Commission on Civil Rights. February 2001. pp. 1–35.
- Walker-McWilliams, Marcia (2016). Reverend Addie Wyatt: Faith and the Fight for Labor, Gender, and Racial Equality. Urbana, Illinois: University of Illinois Press. ISBN 978-0-252-04052-8. OCLC 958585913.
- Walker-McWilliams, Marcia (2018). "A New Era for Labor? The Promises and Perils of the Fast Food Workers Strike Movement". In Conyers, James L. Jr. (ed.). Africana Social Stratification: An Interdisciplinary Study of Economics, Policy, and Labor. Lanham, Maryland: Lexington Books. pp. 87–102. ISBN 979-8-216-30615-3. OCLC 1536134885.
