= Patent racism =

Discriminatory practices in US patent law

Patent racism refers to systemic barriers and discriminatory practices within patent law in the United States that disproportionately affect minority groups, particularly African-American inventors.

== History ==
=== Origins and early exclusion ===
The origins of patent racism in the United States can be traced back to the country's founding and the institution of slavery. Enslaved individuals were legally prohibited from owning patents, effectively denying them recognition and economic benefits for their innovations. In 1858, the U.S. Attorney General ruled that a free African American could not be granted a patent for his invention, based on the interpretation that African Americans were not considered citizens and therefore could not enter into the required patent oath.

Economic historian Sean Vannatta suggests that some key antebellum inventions, such as Eli Whitney's cotton gin and Cyrus McCormick's reaper, were likely influenced by the contributions of enslaved individuals. There is evidence that a slave named Sam and his father provided Whitney with the idea for a comb-like device to remove seeds from cotton for the cotton gin. Similarly, an enslaved man named Jo Anderson is believed to have helped McCormick develop his reaper.

=== Reconstruction era challenges ===
Following the American Civil War, African American inventors faced new challenges in the patent system. The period saw a significant decline in patent filings by African Americans, correlating with heightened racial violence and the enforcement of segregation laws. The landmark Plessy v. Ferguson decision in 1896, which legalized "separate but equal" public facilities, coincided with a sharp drop in African American patenting rates.

=== Impact of racial violence ===
Research has demonstrated that racial violence significantly impacted African American innovation rates. Lisa Cook's study found that between 1870 and 1940, lynchings and riots were associated with a decline in patent filings by African Americans. The Tulsa race massacre in 1921 led to a notable drop in patent filings by African Americans across the country.

=== Long-term consequences ===
The historical exclusion of African Americans from the patent system has had lasting effects. Research estimates that the United States missed out on over 1,100 inventions from black inventors between 1870 and 1940. Additionally, the lack of exposure to innovation among minorities has continued to prevent inventions with potential for significant societal impact.

== Notable incidents ==
=== Oscar J. E. Stuart and Ned's Cotton Scraper ===
In 1857, Oscar J. E. Stuart, a lawyer and planter from Mississippi, tried to patent a "double plow and scraper" invented by his slave, Ned. Stuart first attempted to patent the invention in Ned's name and then in his own, but both applications were denied by the Commissioner of Patents. The denial was based on the fact that Ned, as a slave, could not execute the required patent oath, and Stuart could not claim to be the inventor.

=== Benjamin Boardley and the steam engine ===
Benjamin Boardley, born into slavery around 1830, developed an improved marine steam engine while working at the United States Naval Academy. Due to his status as an enslaved person, Boardley could not legally apply for or be granted a patent for his invention. He ultimately sold the rights to his invention and used the proceeds to purchase his freedom.

=== Henry Boyd and the Boyd Bedstead ===
Henry Boyd, born into slavery in Kentucky in 1802, invented the "Boyd Bedstead," a corded bed with wooden rails connected to the headboard and footboard. After purchasing his freedom in 1826, Boyd moved to Cincinnati, Ohio, and became a successful businessman. Due to racial prejudices at the time, Boyd believed he would face difficulties obtaining a patent. Consequently, he partnered with a white craftsman, George Porter, who applied for and received the patent on Boyd's behalf in 1833.

=== Benjamin Montgomery and Jefferson Davis patent controversy ===
In the late 1850s, Benjamin Montgomery, an enslaved inventor, created an improved steamboat propeller for shallow waters. Montgomery was enslaved on the plantation of Joseph Davis, the brother of future Confederate president Jefferson Davis.

In 1857, Jefferson Davis attempted to patent Montgomery's invention, but the U.S. Patent Office rejected the application. Subsequently, Joseph Davis, Montgomery's enslaver, filed his own patent claim, arguing that since Montgomery was his property, the enslaved man's creations must also be his property. The Patent Office rejected this claim as well. The rejection was due to two reasons:

1. Montgomery, as an enslaved person, was not considered a US citizen and therefore could not hold a patent.
2. Jefferson Davis could not claim the patent because he was not the true inventor.

In 1861, under Jefferson Davis' leadership, the Confederate States enacted a patent law that formalized slaveholders' ownership of their slaves' inventions. This Confederate Patent Act explicitly allowed slave owners to patent inventions made by their slaves, in contrast to United States patent law, which had previously denied such applications.

On June 28, 1864, Montgomery, no longer a slave, filed a patent application for his device, but the patent office again rejected his application, perpetuating the denial of recognition and economic benefit.

=== Success stories ===
Despite these barriers, some Black inventors managed to secure patents and recognition for their work.

- In 1821, Thomas L. Jennings, who was born free in New York City, became the first African American to be granted a patent in the United States. His patent was for a dry cleaning method he called "dry scouring." Jennings' accomplishment came thirty-one years after Samuel Hopkins was granted the first U.S. patent on July 31, 1790, for his method of producing potash.
- Elijah McCoy, an African American inventor, developed an automated lubrication system for locomotives, which became known as "the real McCoy" to distinguish it from inferior imitations. His achievements were publicized by Black leaders as a means to counteract racist stereotypes and inspire the Black community.
- In the early twentieth century, Garrett A. Morgan, who invented the gas mask and a traffic signal, faced racial prejudice in the marketplace. To avoid discrimination, he hired white actors to demonstrate his inventions at trade shows.

== Modern-day patent racism ==
Patent racism remains a significant issue in the United States despite advancements in civil rights and anti-discrimination laws. Modern-day patent racism manifests through systemic barriers that disproportionately affect minority groups, particularly African-American inventors.

=== Disparities in patent rates ===
Studies have highlighted disparities in patent rates between African-American inventors and their white counterparts. From 1970 to 2006, African-American inventors received patents at a rate of six patents per million people, compared to 235 patents per million for all U.S. inventors. This disparity highlights the ongoing challenges faced by African-American inventors in accessing the patent system.

=== Economic and social barriers ===
Several factors contribute to the lower patenting rates among African-American inventors, including economic and social barriers. African-Americans are more likely to come from lower-income backgrounds, which significantly reduces their likelihood of obtaining patents. A child born to a family below the median income level is ten times less likely to receive a patent in their lifetime compared to a child born to a family in the top one percent of income.

=== Algorithmic bias ===
Modern patent systems also face challenges related to algorithmic bias. Patented algorithms that use public data for racial and ethnic classifications can perpetuate systemic racism present in the underlying datasets. These classification tools, when combined with advertisement-based platforms, risk amplifying existing racial biases.

=== Impact on innovation and economic growth ===
The underrepresentation of African-American inventors in the patent system has broader implications for innovation and economic growth. Greater diversity in patenting could unlock a wealth of innovation and economic opportunities that are currently untapped. Addressing racial disparities in patenting could significantly increase overall innovation rates in the United States.
