= Ben Bradley (philosopher) =

American philosopher (born 1971)

- Born: 1971 (age 54–55)

Academic background
- Education: University of Massachusetts at Amherst (PhD), Lawrence University (BA)
- Thesis: Species of goodness (1999)
- Doctoral advisor: Fred Feldman
- Other advisors: Phillip Bricker, Gareth Matthews, Angelika Kratzer

Academic work
- Discipline: philosophy
- Institutions: Syracuse University
- Main interests: ethical theory, philosophy of death

Ben Bradley (born 1971) is an American philosopher and Anita and Allan D. Sutton Distinguished Professor of Philosophy at Syracuse University. He is known for his works on ethical theory and philosophy of death. Bradley is an editor-in-chief of Ergo.

== Books ==
- Well-Being. Polity Press, 2015
- The Oxford Handbook of Philosophy of Death, co-edited with Fred Feldman and Jens Johansson, Oxford University Press. 2012
- Well-Being and Death. Oxford: Clarendon Press. 2009
