= Urgo =

Urgo is a surname. Notable people with that name include:

- Joseph Urgo (active from 1986), American academic avministrator
- Keith Urgo (born 1980). American college basketball coach

== Other uses ==
- "Urgo", a season 3 episode of Stargate SG-1

== See also ==
- Ergo (disambiguation)
