= Kerstiaen de Keuninck =

Flemish Baroque painter

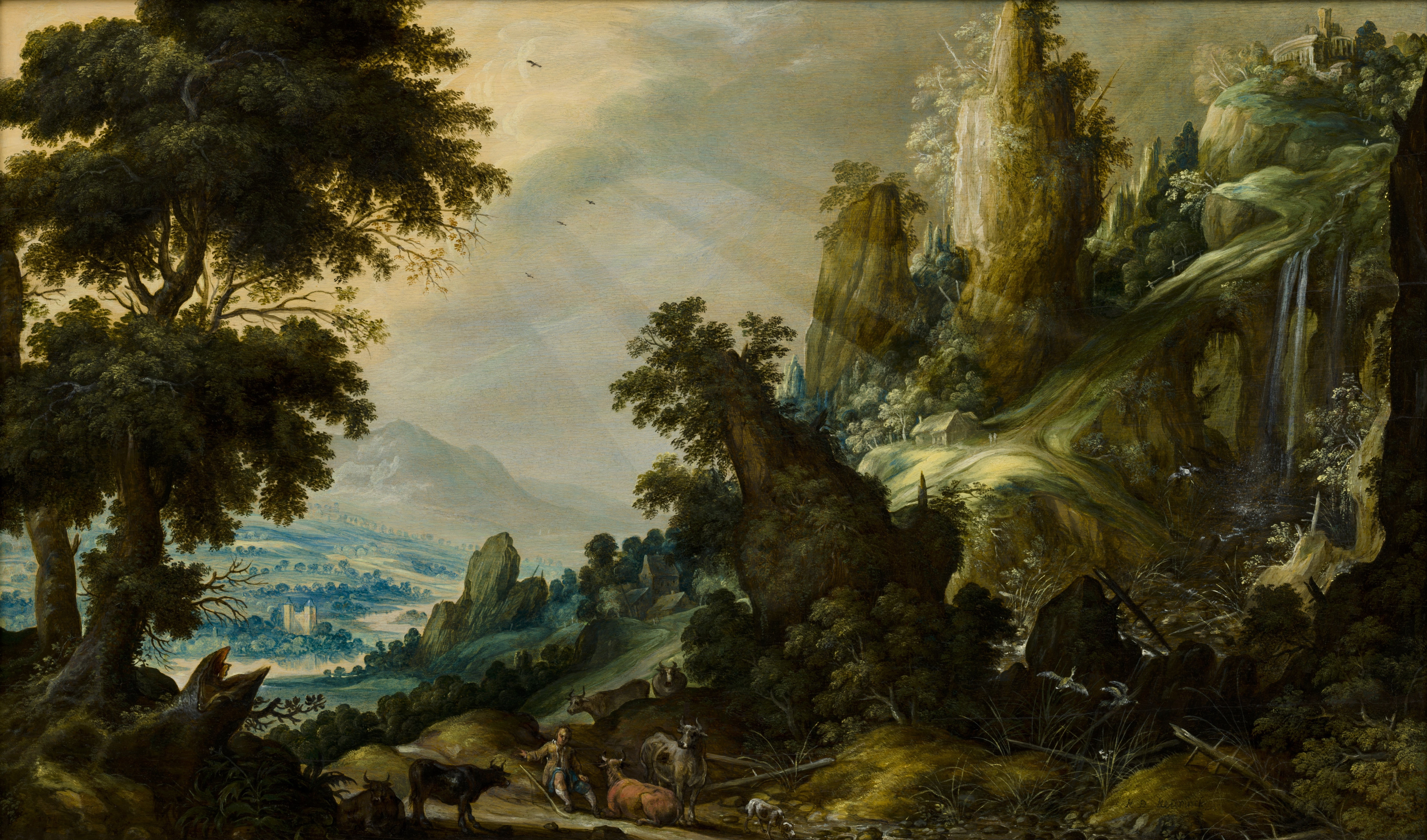
Mountain Landscape with Waterfall Kerstiaen de Keuninck

Kerstiaen de Keuninck (1560, Kortrijk – 1632, Antwerp), was a Flemish Baroque painter.

== Biography ==
According to the RKD he is known for landscapes. His pupils were Engelbert Ergo and Carel van Ferrara.

== Gallery ==
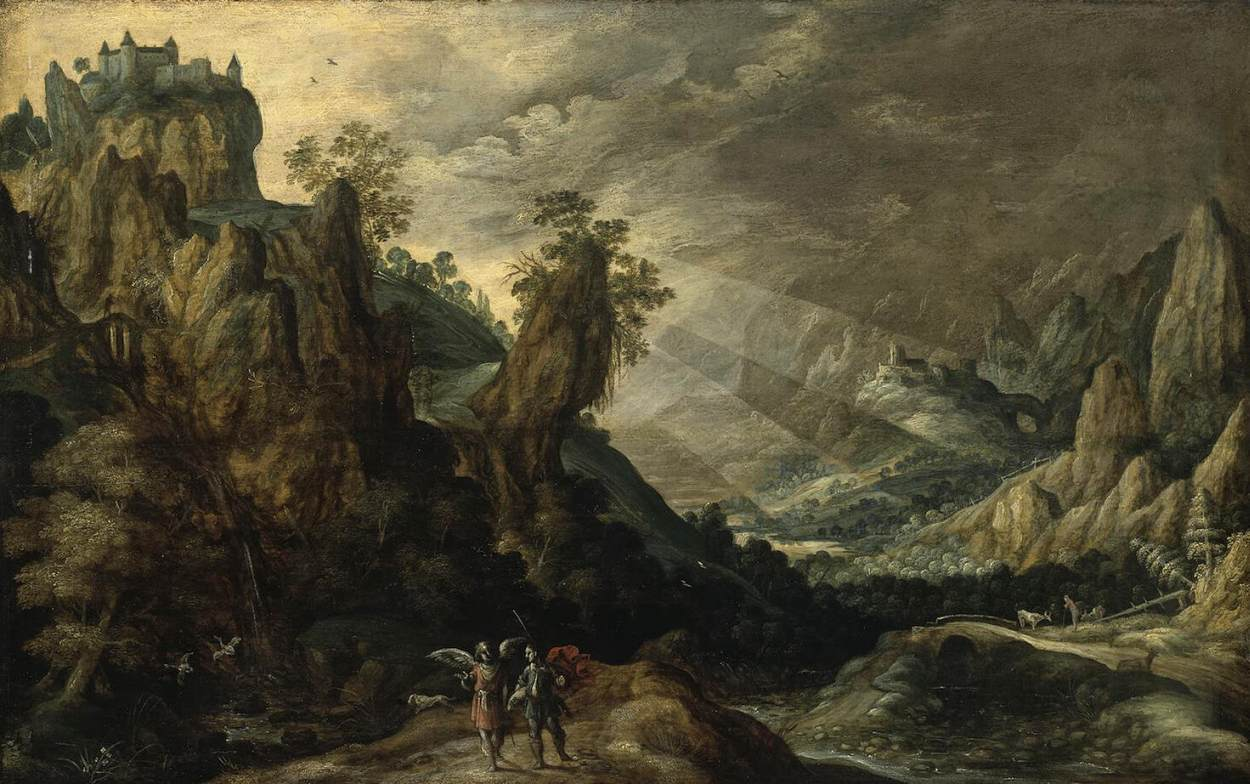
Landscape with Tobias and the angel

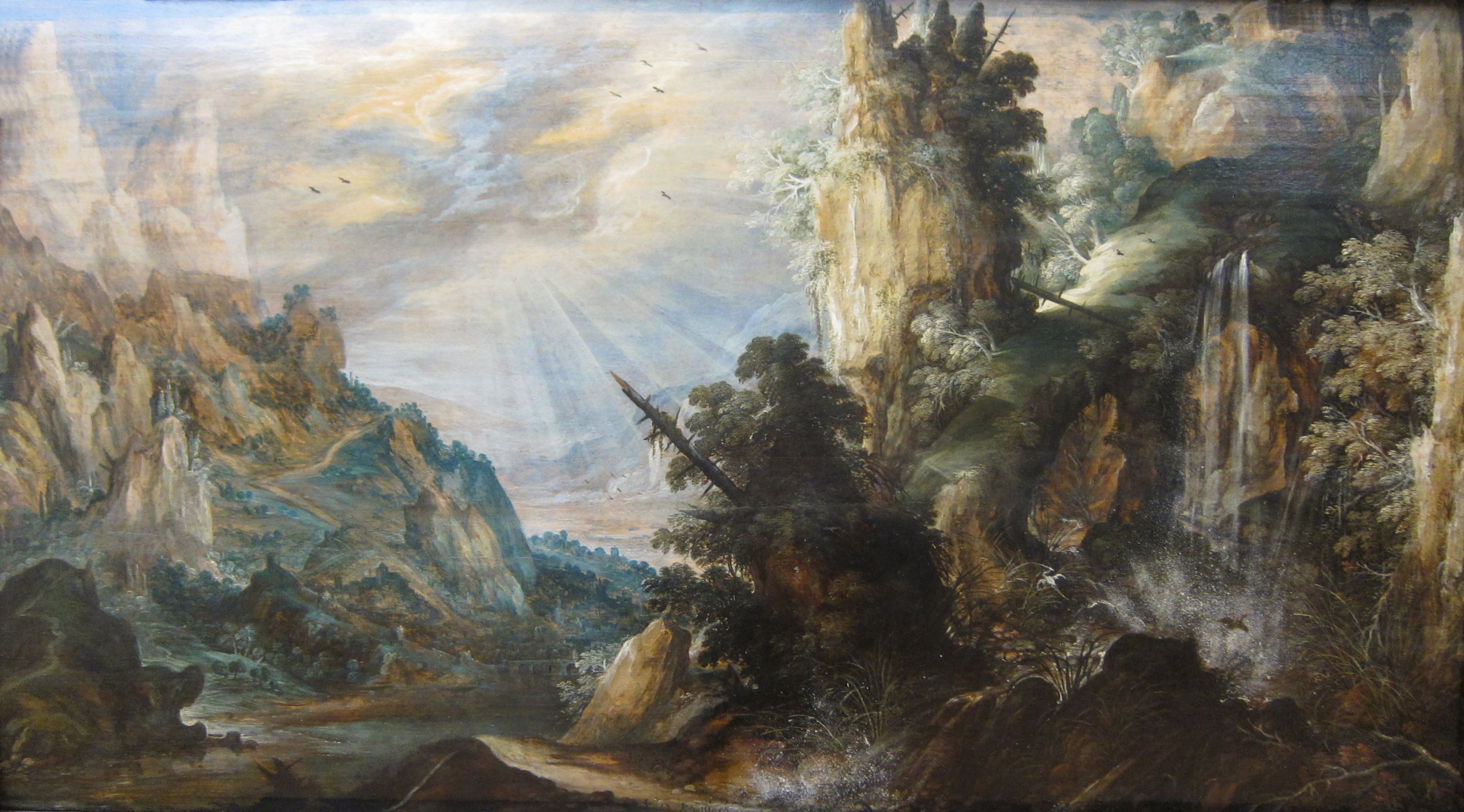
'A Mountainous Landscape with a Waterfall'
