= Peter Markie =

American philosopher

- Born: April 4, 1950 (age 76)

Education
- Education: New York University (BA); University of Massachusetts Amherst (PhD)
- Doctoral advisor: Fred Feldman
- Other advisors: Bruce Aune, Vere C. Chappell

Philosophical work
- Era: Contemporary philosophy
- Region: Western philosophy
- Institutions: University of Missouri
- Main interests: Cartesian philosophy

Peter Markie (born April 4, 1950) is an American philosopher and Chancellor's Professor and Curators’ Distinguished Teaching Professor Emeritus at the University of Missouri. He is known for his work on Cartesian philosophy.

== Books ==
- Descartes's Gambit, Cornell University Press, 1988
- A Professor’s Duties, Rowman and Littlefield, 1994
- Reason At Work, 3rd edition, with Cahn, Kitcher and Sher, Harcourt Brace, 1995
- Ethics, with S. Cahn, Oxford University Press, 4th edition, 2008
