= Ann J. Abadie =

American academic (1939–2024)

- Born: Elizabeth Ann Julian; August 15, 1939; Greenville, South Carolina, U.S.
- Died: July 30, 2024 (age 84); Tupelo, Mississippi, U.S.
- Occupations: Editor, scholar

Elizabeth Ann Julian Abadie (August 15, 1939 – July 30, 2024) was an American scholar and editor, focused mainly on the works of William Faulkner. She was a founder and associate director of the Center for the Study of Southern Culture from 1979 to 2011, and organized the school's annual conference on William Faulkner from 1974 to 2011.

== Early life and education ==
Abadie was born in Greenville, South Carolina, the daughter of Frank Jefferson Julian and Pansy Luna Falls Julian. Her father worked in a textile mill. She graduated from Wake Forest University in 1960, and completed doctoral studies at the University of Mississippi in 1963, with a dissertation on William Faulkner.

== Career ==
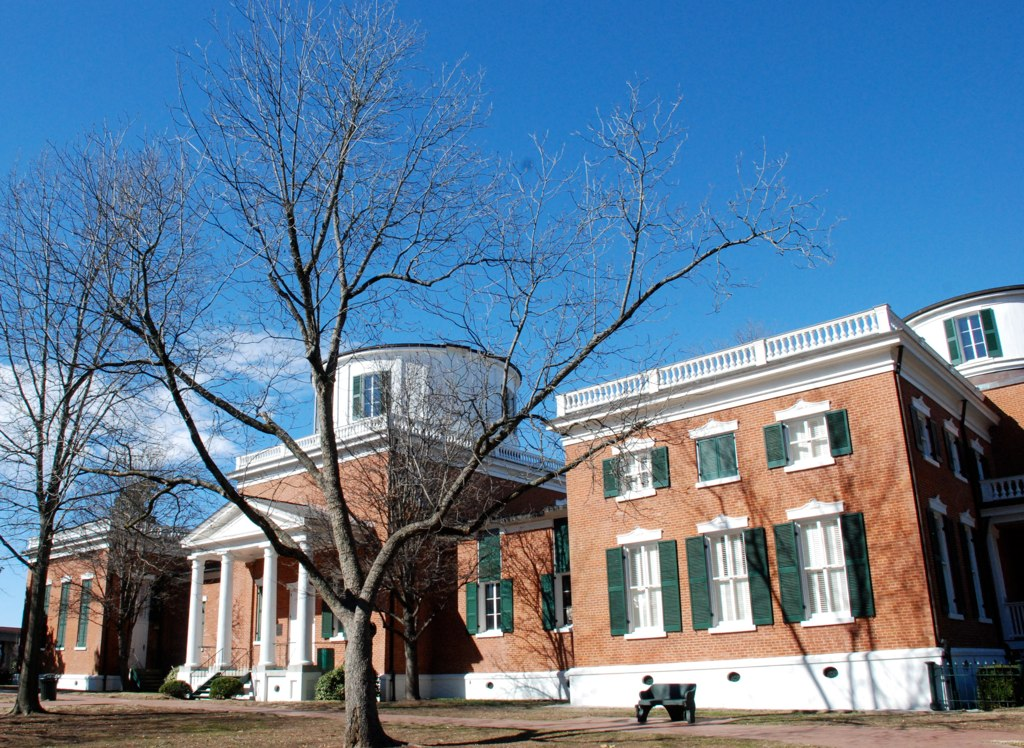
Barnard Observatory at the University of Mississippi, home of the Center for the Study of Southern Culture where Ann J. Abadie served as founder and associate director.

Abadie organized the University of Mississippi's annual conference on William Faulkner from 1974 to 2011. She was a founder and associate director of the Center for the Study of Southern Culture at the University of Mississippi, from writing proposals for its funding in the mid-1970s, through years of acquiring important collections for the center's archives, until her retirement in 2011. She edited many of the center's publications, and organized many of its events and exhibitions. In 1999, she was a founding director of the Southern Foodways Alliance. She joined the board of governors of the MIssissippi Institute of Arts and Letters in 2007.

In 2019, the Southern Foodways Alliance recognized her contributions with the Craig Claiborne Lifetime Achievement Award. In 2020, Abadie received the Noel Polk Lifetime Achievement Award from the Mississippi Institute of Arts and Letters.

== Publications ==
=== Faulkner scholarship ===
For many years, Abadie co-edited a collection of essays from the annual Faulkner and Yoknapatawpha Conference, held at the University of Mississippi.

- The South and Faulkner's Yoknapatawpha (1977, co-editor with Evans Harrington)
- The Maker and the Myth (1978, co-editor with Evans Harrington)
- Faulkner, Modernism, and Film (1979, co-editor with Evans Harrington)
- Faulkner: International Perspectives (1984, co-editor with Doreen Fowler)
- New Directions in Faulkner Studies (1984, co-editor with Doreen Fowler)
- Faulkner and Race (1987, co-editor with Doreen Fowler)
- Faulkner and the Craft of Fiction (1989, co-editor with Doreen Fowler)
- Faulkner and Popular Culture (1990, with Doreen Fowler)
- Faulkner and Ideology (1995, co-editor with Donald M. Kartiganer)
- Faulkner and Gender (1996, co-editor with Donald M. Kartiganer)
- Faulkner and the Natural World (1999, co-editor with Donald M. Kartiganer)
- Faulkner in America (2001, co-edited with Joseph R. Urgo)
- Faulkner and Postmodernism (2002, co-editor with John Noel Duvall)
- Faulkner and War (2004, co-editor with Noel Polk)
- Faulkner's Inheritance (2007, with Joseph R. Urgo)
- Faulkner and Material Culture (2007, co-editor with Joseph R. Urgo)
- Faulkner and His Contemporaries (2009, co-editor with Joseph R. Urgo)
- Faulkner and the Ecology of the South (2009, co-editor with Joseph R. Urgo)
- Faulkner at 100: Retrospect and Prospect (2009, co-editor with Donald M. Kartiganer)
- Global Faulkner (2010, co-editor with Annette Trefzer)
- Faulkner's Sexualities (2010, co-editor with Annette Trefzer)
- Faulkner and Mystery (2014, co-edited with Annette Trefzer)
- Faulkner and Film (2014, co-editor with Peter Lurie)
- Faulkner's Geographies (2015, co-editor with Jay Watson)
- Fifty Years After Faulkner (2016, co-editor with Jay Watson)

=== Other publications ===
- Encyclopedia of Southern Culture (1989 and 2013, associate editor)
- The Mississippi Encyclopedia (2017, co-editor with Ted Ownby, Charles Reagan Wilson, Odie Lindsey, and James G. Thomas Jr.)
- The Beautiful Mysterious: The Extraordinary Gaze of William Eggleston (2019, co-editor with Robert Saarnio and Marti A. Funke)
- American Landscapes: Meditations on Art and Literature in a Changing World (2023, co-editor with J. Richard Gruber)

== Personal life ==
Ann Julian married University of Mississippi history professor H. Dale Abadie. They had three children. Abadie died in 2024, at the age of 84, in Tupelo, Mississippi.
