= Ergo (journal) =

- Discipline: Philosophy
- Language: English
- Edited by: Ben Bradley, Kevan Edwards, Nicholas K. Jones, Nin Kirkham, Anne Schwenkenbecher, Alastair Wilson

Publication details
- History: 2014–present
- Publisher: Michigan Publishing Services
- Frequency: Annually
- Open access: Yes

Standard abbreviations
- ISO 4: Ergo

Indexing
- ISSN: 2330-4014
- LCCN: 2013203140

Links
- Journal homepage

Ergo: An Open-Access Journal of Philosophy is an annual peer-reviewed open access academic journal of philosophy. It publishes papers on all philosophical topics and from all philosophical traditions. It is published by Michigan Publishing services and the editors-in-chief are Ben Bradley (Syracuse University), Kevan Edwards (Syracuse University), Nicholas Jones (University of Oxford), Nin Kirkham (University of Western Australia), Anne Schwenkenbecher (Murdoch University), and Alastair Wilson (University of Birmingham). The journal is abstracted and indexed in the Arts & Humanities Citation Index and Current Contents/Arts & Humanities.

== See also ==
- List of philosophy journals
