= Benjamin Braidley =

English writer

- Born: 19 August 1792; Sedgefield, Durham
- Died: 3 April 1845 (aged 52)
- Occupation: Author

Benjamin Braidley (1792–1845) was an English writer on Sunday schools.

== Life ==
Braidley was the son of farmer Benjamin Braidley and was born at Sedgefield, Durham, on 19 August 1792. He was apprenticed to a firm of linen importers in Manchester, and in 1813 first became an active worker in the Bennett Street Sunday schools. In 1815, 1,635 pupils received prizes for regular attendance, and in 1816, 2,020 scholars were on the rolls of the schools. In 1830 Braidley was constable, and in 1831 and 1832 boroughreeve of Manchester. He was also high constable of the hundred of Salford.

In 1835 Braidley was twice the unsuccessful candidate in the conservative interest for Manchester. He visited America in 1837, and his diary during his visit shows his major interests as education, the slavery question, and religion, as regarded from an evangelical standpoint. He was a commission agent, and became wealthy; but after the failure of the Northern and Central Bank he lost most of his fortune.

== Writings ==
Braidley was the author of Sunday School Memorials, Manchester, 1831, which contains short biographies of persons connected with the Bennett Street Sunday schools. This work, parts of which first appeared in the Christian Guardian, passed through four editions, the last of which, much enlarged, was published in 1880 as Bennett Street Memorials. Braidley also contributed to the Shepherd's Voice, a religious magazine, and wrote tracts in a local controversy on the doctrines of the Roman Catholic Church.

== Death ==
Braidley died of apoplexy 3 April 1845. He was unmarried.
