= Ergo (Indian newspaper) =

- Ergo masthead
- Type: Daily newspaper
- Format: tabloid
- Owner(s): Kasturi & Sons Ltd.
- Editor: Karthik Subramanian
- Founded: November, 2007
- Headquarters: Chennai
- Website: www.goergo.in

Ergo was an Indian daily newspaper which was published during 2007–2009 by Kasturi & Sons, the publishers of the newspaper The Hindu. It was published in tabloid format and distributed free of cost to Information Technology professionals in the software corridor of Chennai. At its peak, it had a circulation of 55,000 and a readership of 100,000. It ceased publication from 1 August 2009 and is currently available only online.
