= Black Workers for Justice =

Social justice organization of Black workers in the United States

- Formation: 1981; 45 years ago
- Region served: United States
- Website: bwfj.org

Black Workers for Justice (BWFJ) is an organization of Black workers that promotes social democracy, economic justice, social justice, and racial equality within the United States. BWFJ has worked closely with United Electrical, Radio and Machine Workers of America (UE).

== History ==
In 1981, Black workers in North Carolina organized to boycott a K-Mart in Rocky Mount, North Carolina, where the all-White management had fired a Black employee. The first meeting in that campaign drew 400 people. The BWFJ was formally created on December 11, 1982.

In 1985, BWFJ created the Black Workers Unity Movement (BWUM) to attempt to expand beyond North Carolina. In 1996, BWFJ participated in the creation of the modern Labor Party. In 1998, BWFJ participated in the Black Radical Congress founding convention.

== Organizing ==
In 1990, BWFJ helped organize the 1600 workers of Cummins Engine in Rocky Mount, North Carolina. In 2006, BWFJ helped City of Raleigh Solid Waste Division employees unionize. In 2008, BWFJ helped 50 Smithfield Packing slaughterhouse employees in Tar Heel, North Carolina unionize. In 2022, BWFJ helped 4000 Amazon fulfillment center employees in Garner, North Carolina to form Carolina Amazonians United for Solidarity and Empowerment (CAUSE), a step toward unionization.

In 1991, after the Hamlet chicken processing plant fire, BWFJ members repeatedly spoke for justice at community meetings.

== See also ==
- Democratic Socialists of America
- Black Socialists in America
