= Engelbert Ergo =

Flemish Baroque painter

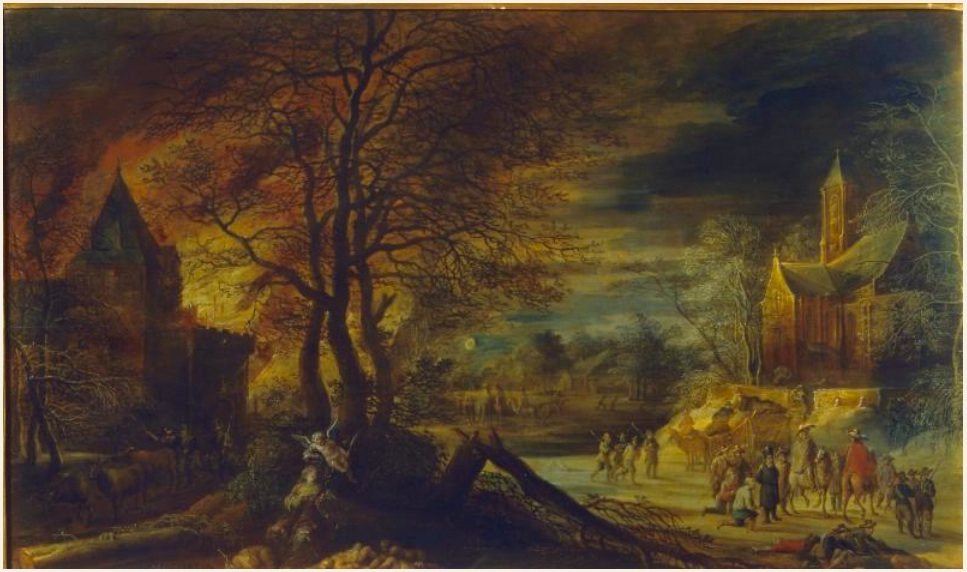
Allegory of Patience

Engelbert Ergo or Engel Ergo (c. 1615 – after 1652) was a Flemish Baroque painter of history paintings and landscapes. His few known works often include religious elements or allegories.

== Life ==
Details about the life of Engelbert Ergo are scarce. He was born in Oudenaarde. He was registered in the guild year 1629–30 under the name Engel Ergo in the Antwerp Guild of Saint Luke as a pupil of Kerstiaen de Keuninck, an artist known for his oeuvre of landscapes and disaster scenes. He was registered as a master in 1641–42. In 1644–45 and 1651–52 he took on pupils.

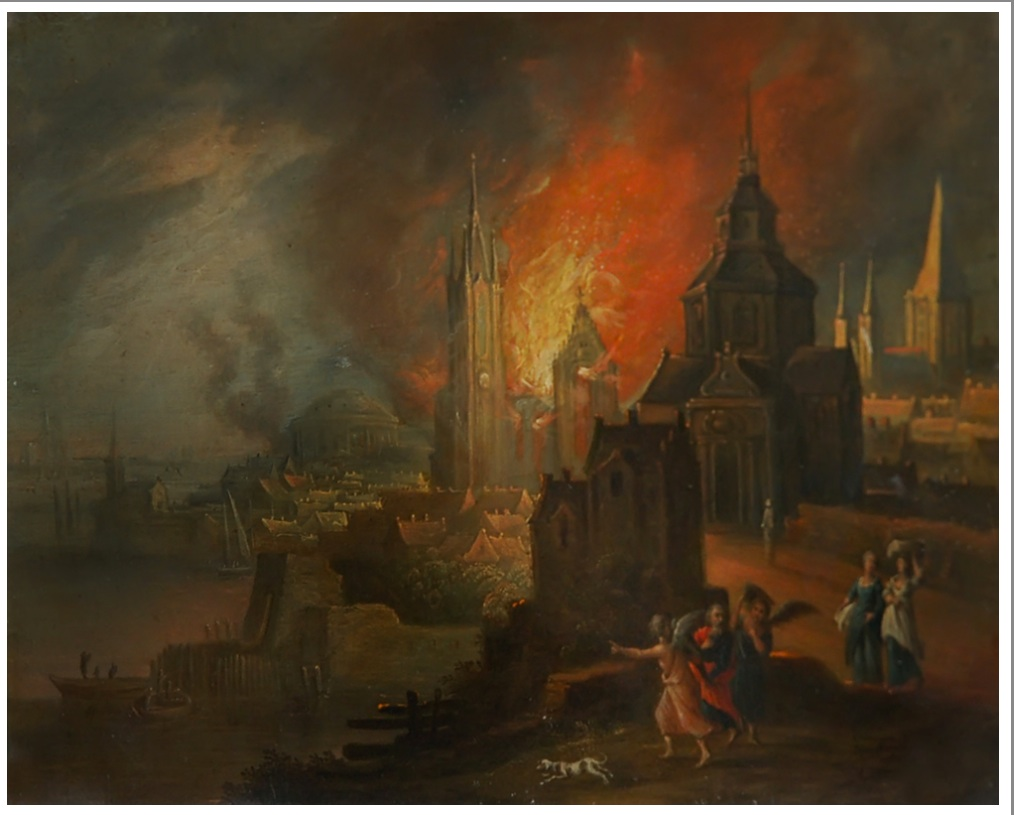
The Escape of Loth from Sodoma

There are no records about the artist after 1652. He is believed to have worked for the Antwerp art dealers such as the Forchondt family.

== Work ==
Ergo is known for his history paintings and landscapes. Ergo's works are very rare. His paintings often contain an allegorical meaning. For instance a landscape painting held by the Pushkin Museum contains an allegorical meaning relating to patience and the painting is therefore referred to as the Allegory of Patience. Ergo made copies of his own work as is demonstrated by the fact that a similar Allegory of Patience was auctioned at Christie's in 2012 (Amsterdam auction of 14 November 2012, lot 33).

He also produced several landscapes with animals such as Orpheus charming the animals (at Jean Moust in 2014) and Noah gathering the Animals (Auctioned at Bonhams on 17 June 2008 in London, lot 12).
