= Fred Feldman =

American philosopher

- Born: 1941 (age 84–85); Newark, New Jersey, U.S.

Education
- Education: Bard College (B.A., 1963); SUNY (M.A., 1965); Brown University (Ph.D., 1968)
- Doctoral advisor: Roderick Chisholm

Philosophical work
- Era: Contemporary philosophy
- Region: Western philosophy
- School: Analytic
- Institutions: University of Massachusetts Amherst
- Doctoral students: Peter Markie; Robert S. Welch
- Main interests: Ethical theory

Fred Feldman (born 1941) is an American philosopher who specializes in ethical theory. He was professor emeritus of philosophy at the University of Massachusetts Amherst, where he taught from 1969 until his retirement in 2013. His research primarily focused on normative ethics, metaethics, the nature of happiness, and justice. He had long been fascinated by philosophical problems about the nature and value of death. He received a NEH research fellowship for the 2008/09 academic year and a Conti Faculty research fellowship for the 2013/14 academic year.

== Biography ==
Feldman was born in 1941 and grew up in Maplewood, New Jersey, where he graduated in 1959 from Columbia High School. After graduating from Bard College in 1963, he received a master's degree from Harpur College, SUNY (now SUNY Binghamton) in 1965. Feldman received his PhD degree in philosophy from Brown University, where he studied under Roderick Chisholm. His doctoral dissertation concerned the metaphysics of identity. He is emeritus professor of philosophy at the University of Massachusetts Amherst, where he spent almost his entire academic career.

His books include Doing the Best We Can (Kluwer, 1986), Confrontations with the Reaper (Oxford, 1992), Pleasure and the Good Life (Oxford, 2004), and What is This Thing Called Happiness? (Oxford, 2010). He has written a number of journal articles on metaphysics, deontic logic, theory of intrinsic value, theory of personal welfare, hedonist philosophy, morally right action, and death. He received a National Endowment for the Humanities fellowship for spring 2008 to work on a new book on happiness.

His younger brother, Richard Feldman, is professor of philosophy, former dean of the College in Arts, Sciences and Engineering, and interim president at the University of Rochester.

== Publications ==
=== Books ===
His books include:

- Introductory Ethics, Prentice-Hall, 1978. viii + 255. Korean translation 1999 by Chul Hak kwa Hyun Sil Sa Publishing Co.; Turkish translation 2009, Etik Nedir? Translated by Ferit Burak Aydar, Bogazici Universitesi Yayinevi.
- A Cartesian Introduction to Philosophy, McGraw-Hill, January, 1986. xi + 223.
- Doing the Best We Can: An Essay in Informal Deontic Logic, Reidel, March, 1986, xiv + 244.
- Confrontations with the Reaper: A Philosophical Study of the Nature and Value of Death, Oxford University Press, 1992. xiv + 249; Second Edition (paperback), December 1993.
- Utilitarianism, Hedonism, and Desert: Essays in Moral Philosophy, Cambridge University Press, New York, 1997, ix + 220. Cambridge Studies in Philosophy series.
- Pleasure and the Good Life: On the Nature, Varieties, and Plausibility of Hedonism, Oxford University Press, Oxford, 2004, xi + 221; Second Edition (paperback), March 2006.
- What Is This Thing Called Happiness? Oxford University Press, Oxford, March 2010, xv + 286; Second Edition (paperback), 2012.
- Distributive Justice: Getting What We Deserve From Our Country, Oxford University Press, Oxford. Forthcoming summer 2016.

=== Edited collections ===
His edited collections include:

- Introduction to Philosophy custom published by McGraw-Hill, 1993. An anthology containing 19 selections for use in introductory philosophy courses.
- Introduction to Ethics custom published by McGraw-Hill, 1998. An anthology containing selections for use in introductory ethics courses.
- The Oxford Handbook of Philosophy of Death, co-edited by Ben Bradley, Fred Feldman, and Jens Johansson. Oxford University Press, 2013. An anthology containing 25 invited papers by 25 philosophers who have made major contributions to the philosophical literature on death.

=== Articles and reviews ===
Feldman has over 80 published articles and reviews. Below is a selected list of journal articles and reviews. For a full list of publications, visit his curriculum vitae.

- Counterparts, The Journal of Philosophy 68 (1971): 406-409.
- On the Intrinsic Value of Pleasures, Ethics 107 (1997): 448-466.
- The Good Life: A Defense of Attitudinal Hedonism, Philosophy and Phenomenological Research 65 (2002): 604-628.
- Adjusting Utility for Justice, Philosophy and Phenomenological Research 55 (1995): 567-585.
- Basic Intrinsic Value, Philosophical Studies 99 (2000): 319-346.
- Desert: Reconsideration of Some Received Wisdom, Mind 104(1995): 63-77.
- Some Puzzles About the Evil of Death, The Philosophical Review 100 (1991): 205-227.
- The Termination Thesis, Midwest Studies in Philosophy 24 (2000): 98-115.
- Obligations - Absolute, Conditioned, and Conditional, Philosophia12 (1983): 257-272.
- The Principle of Moral Harmony, The Journal of Philosophy 77 (1980): 166-179.
- Epistemic Appraisal and the Cartesian Circle, Philosophical Studies 27 (1975): 37-55. The Journal of Philosophy 68 (1971): 406-409.
- Kripke on the Identity Theory, The Journal of Philosophy 71 (1974): 665-677.
- Sortal Predicates, Noûs 7 (1973): 268-282.
- Hyperventilating About Intrinsic Value, The Journal of Ethics 2 (1998): 339-354.

== Awards ==
His awards include:

- Conti Faculty Research Fellowship, University of Massachusetts, for the academic year of 2013-2014. This fellowship enabled full-time work on the manuscript of the book Distributive Justice: Getting What We Deserve from our Country.
- UMass Alumni Association Distinguished Faculty Award for 2013.
- Selected as a 2010-2011 University of Massachusetts Distinguished Faculty Lecturer. Presented talk “What Is This Thing Called Happiness?” on March 1, 2011. Received Chancellor’s Medal -- “the highest honor given by the University of Massachusetts to individuals for exemplary and extraordinary service to the campus.”
- National Endowment for the Humanities Research Fellowship, 2008. This fellowship, together with support from UMass, enabled full-time work on the manuscript of the book What Is This Thing Called Happiness? The book was published by Oxford University Press in the UK in March, 2010 and in the US in June, 2010.
- Outstanding Accomplishments in Research and Creative Activity for 2009-2010, College of Humanities and Fine Arts, UMass Amherst.
- The Good, The Right, Life, and Death: Essays in Honor of Fred Feldman, ed. by R. Feldman, K. McDaniel, J. Raibley, and M. Zimmerman, Ashgate, 2006. A festschrift in Feldman's honor containing essays on his work by fourteen philosophers from the US, the UK, Canada, and Sweden.
- Outstanding Teacher of the Year 2001-02, College of Humanities and Fine Arts, UMass Amherst.
- Distinguished Teacher Award, University of Massachusetts, 1991-92.
- Student Choice Award for 2010-2011.

== See also ==
- American philosophy
- List of American philosophers
