= Benjamin Bradley (inventor) =

American engineer and inventor

Benjamin Boardley (March 1830 – 1904) was an American engineer and inventor.

Benjamin's correct surname was Boardley, but since 1859 when the African Repository published an article wrongly spelling Benjamin's surname as Bradley, authors have written about him with the incorrect surname.

== Early life ==
Benjamin Boardley was born a slave in Anne Arundel County, Maryland, in March 1830. It has been theorized that he acquired literacy while learning from his master's children. According to the Maryland State Manumission records, Bradley's owner was John T. Hammond.

As a teenager, Bradley worked at a printing office. He showed ingenuity and mechanical skills by the age of 16, when he built a steam engine out of a gun barrel, pewter, round steel, and other various materials. His master was impressed and was able to get him a job as a helper in the Department of Natural and Experimental Philosophy at the Naval Academy at Annapolis.

== Career ==
At the U.S. Naval Academy, Bradley worked as a helper. According to the African Repository of 1859, he was paid in full for his work, but the money he had made went to his master, who allowed Bradley to keep five dollars a month for himself. As a helper at the academy, Bradley helped set up science experiments that involved chemical gases.

It is mentioned that his professors at the Naval Academy were very impressed with him. Professor Hopkins of the Naval Academy wrote about Bradley's work as a helper at the Academy, writing that he would set up experiments, that he was a quick learner and that "he looks for the law by which things act". Professor Hopkins's children taught Bradley how to read and write as well as do math (such as arithmetic, algebra and geometry).

During his time at the Naval Academy, Bradley built a steam engine and sold it to a Midshipman. With the money he made from selling the steam engine, and the money that he had saved while working at the Naval Academy, he developed and built a steam engine large enough to run "the first cutter of a sloop-of-war" at a speed of 16 knots (18 mph). Cutters were small Ship's boats carried by larger sloops-of-war (warships). According to the US Navy Textbook of Seamanship (1891), a 'first cutter' was 26–30 feet (7.9–9.1 m) in length.

Because he was a slave, Bradley was not allowed to get a patent for the engine he developed. He was, however, able to sell the engine. He used the proceeds, plus the money given to him by professors at the Naval Academy, to buy his freedom for $1,000 (~$35,833 in 2025). According to the Maryland State Manumission records, Bradley was manumitted from his owner, John T. Hammond, on September 30, 1859.

During the Civil War, the U.S. Naval Academy was relocated to Newport, Rhode Island. According to the African Repository Aug. 1865, Bradley was employed as a freeman at the U.S. Naval Academy in Rhode Island and worked under Prof. A.W. Smith. There, Bradley continued his work on constructing small steam engines and continued to show his ingenious mechanical skills. He worked as an instructor in the Philosophical Department at the Naval Academy in 1864. He was credited at designing and constructing a "miniature steam-engine and boiler about 6-fly power".

== Later life ==
According to the 1900 U.S. Census, Bradley was 64 years old and living in Mashpee, Massachusetts. His occupation was described as a "philosophical lecturer". The Census also indicated that he was married to Gertrude Boardley for 19 years, and they had three children together.
