= Joseph Urgo =

Joe Urgo is Provost and Vice Chancellor for Academic Affairs at the University of North Carolina Asheville. A former Senior Fellow with the Association of American Colleges and Universities, Urgo served as president of St. Mary's College of Maryland from 2010-2013. Urgo served as Dean of Faculty at Hamilton College (2006-2010) and Chair of the Department of English at The University of Mississippi (2000-2006). He rose through the faculty ranks at Bryant University (1989-2000) and held a Mellon Postdoctoral Fellowship at Vanderbilt University (1986-1989). Urgo has a PhD from Brown University in American Civilization, an M.A.L.S. from Wesleyan University, and a B.A. from Haverford College.

Urgo has supported broad access to education in the liberal arts and sciences, speaking and writing often on issues of access and affordability. Joe and Lesley Urgo have been strong advocates for the natural beauty of the campus and under Lesley’s volunteer efforts, established the St. Mary's College arboretum.

Urgo created Mississippi’s first M.F.A. program. He also earned a grant for the university from the Mississippi Humanities Council for a Creative Writing Program at Marshall County Corrections Facility.

For the Spring term, 2009, Urgo was Acting President at Hamilton College in central New York. From 2006–2010, he served as chief academic officer at Hamilton, leading all academic programs and services. He coordinated Hamilton’s campus-wide strategic planning process and created the position of associate dean for diversity initiatives.

Urgo's research interests focus on the works of 20th-century American novelists and writers William Faulkner and Willa Cather. He has published six books, the most recent being Reading Faulkner: Absalom, Absalom! (2010, University Press of Mississippi), co-authored with Noel Polk.

He serves as an advisory member on the Board of Governors of the Willa Cather Pioneer Memorial and Educational Foundation, as a co-editor of The Faulkner Journal, and on the editorial board of The Willa Cather Newsletter and Review. He was also formerly an advisory editor of College Literature.

== Selected writing ==
- “Superliteracy in the Age of Information: Preparation for Higher Discourse (PhD),” Profession 2013 (Modern Language Association, 2013), http://profession.commons.mla.org/2013/12/09/superliteracy-in-the-age-of-information/
- “On College Athletics,” The Huffington Post (November 18, 2013), http://www.huffingtonpost.com/joseph-urgo/on-college-athletics_b_4288920.html
- “From General Education to Civic Preparation: The Public Purpose of the Liberal Arts and Sciences,” The Huffington Post (November 4, 2013), http://www.huffingtonpost.com/joseph-urgo/from-general-education-to_b_4194310.html?ir=College
- “The Spread of Drone Technologies on College Campuses,” The Huffington Post (September 5, 2013). http://www.huffingtonpost.com/joseph-urgo/the-spread-of-drone-techn_b_3875457.html
