= Philosophy of death =

Philosophical investigations regarding death

In ethics and other branches of philosophy, death poses difficult questions, answered differently by various philosophers. Among the many topics explored by the philosophy of death are suicide, capital punishment, abortion, personal identity, immortality and definition of death.

== See also ==
- Advocacy of suicide
- Letting die
- Right to die
