= Christian Reformed Church =

Christian Reformed Church may refer to:

- Reformed Christianity, also known as the Reformed Church or Calvinism, a major branch of Protestantism
- Any of several Calvinist denominations:
  - Christian Reformed Churches of Australia, a Presbyterian denomination in Australia
  - Christian Reformed Church of Campo Belo, formerly the Swiss Evangelical Church of São Paulo, in Brazil
  - Presbyterian and Reformed Church of Costa Rica, formerly the Reformed Christian Church in Costa Rica
  - Christian Reformed Church in Cuba
  - Christian Reformed Church of the Dominican Republic
  - Christian Reformed Church in Eastern Africa
  - Christian Reformed Church in El Salvador
  - Christian Reformed Church in Haiti
  - Christian Reformed Church in Honduras
  - Christian Reformed Church in Myanmar
  - Christian Reformed Churches (Netherlands), an Evangelical Presbyterian church in the Netherlands
  - Christian Reformed Church in Nicaragua
  - Christian Reformed Church of Nigeria
  - Christian Reformed Church in North America, an Evangelical Calvinist denomination in the United States and Canada
    - Elmhurst Christian Reformed Church
    - First Christian Reformed Church of Toronto
  - Christian Reformed Church in the Philippines
  - Christian Reformed Church in Sierra Leone
  - Christian Reformed Church in South Africa
  - Christian Reformed Church in Sri Lanka
  - Orthodox Christian Reformed Churches in North America, a former denomination in Canada and the United States which joined the United Reformed Churches in North America in 2008

== See also ==
- CRC (disambiguation)
