= CLA =

CLA may refer to:

== Organizations ==
- California Library Association, US
- Canadian Lacrosse Association
- Canadian Library Association
- Canadian Lung Association
- Caprivi Liberation Army
- Children's Learning Adventure, an American daycare center chain
- Christian Labor Association
- CliftonLarsonAllen, American accounting firm
- Clutterers Anonymous
- College of Liberal Arts (disambiguation), multiple institutions
- Commonwealth Lawyers Association
- Communist League of America, 1928–1934
- Connecticut Library Association, US
- Copyright Licensing Agency, UK
- Country Land and Business Association, formerly the Country Landowners' Association

== Science and technology ==
- Carry-lookahead adder, in digital logic
- Caseous lymphadenitis, an infectious disease caused by Corynebacterium pseudotuberculosis
- Codices Latini Antiquiores, a catalogue of surviving manuscripts in Latin
- Conjugated linoleic acid
- Cortical Learning Algorithm, in artificial intelligence
- Centro de Lançamento de Alcântara, a Brazilian satellite launching base
- Congenital lactic acidosis, a disease caused by mutations in mtDNA that cause too much lactic acid to build up in the body

== Stations ==
- Clandon railway station, Surrey, England, by station code
- Claremont (Amtrak station), New Hampshire, US, by Amtrak station code
- Clayton railway station, Melbourne, by station code

== People ==
- Brand used by Chris Lord-Alge, American mix engineer
- Cla Meredith (born 1983), former baseball player

== Other uses ==
- CargoLogicAir, a British cargo airline
- Causal layered analysis, a futures technique
- Cigarette lighter adapter, a DC power socket in automobiles
- Clã, a Portuguese band
- Collective labour agreement
- Collegiate Learning Assessment, a US test
- Comilla Airport (IATA airport code)
- Contributor License Agreement
- County Clare, Ireland, Chapman code
- Mercedes-Benz CLA-class automobiles
