= Reformed Church of East Africa =

The Reformed Church of East Africa was founded in 1944 when the Dutch Reformed Church in South Africa started mission work in Eldoret Kenya. This work was overtaken by the missionaries came from the Netherlands Reformed Church. The church accepted the Three Forms of Unity. When the Dutch missionaries left, they left behind a Kenyan Reformed church. At the time it has more than 600 congregations and 110,000 members. The denomination has a theological seminary in Eldoret, The Reformed Institute For Theological Training (RITT). RITT offers courses in Theology. The church become autonomous in 1963. There are more than 110,000 adherents. The Christian Reformed Church in Eastern Africa separated in 1992. It is a member of the World Communion of Reformed Churches. It has official relationship with the Christian Reformed Church in North America.

== Theology ==
- Athanasian Creed
- Nicene Creed
- Canons of Dort
- Heidelberg Catechism
- Westminster Confession of Faith
