= Christian Reformed Church in Haiti =

1987 mission effort

The Christian Reformed Church in Haiti was a mission effort of the Christian Reformed Church in North America and the Christian Reformed Church of the Dominican Republic in 1987. Two pastors were sent to Haiti from Dominican Republic. They were joined by several Haitians and established the John Calvin Theological Seminary in Port-au-Prince and several Reformed congregations. In 1991 70,000 Haitians come to Haiti from the Dominican Republic. Many of these were Christian Reformed. The joint meeting to establish a denomination with the presence of the Reformed churches from the Dominican Republic, Haiti and the United States was held in 1993. The official beginning of the denomination was 1999. It entered into official ecclesiastical fellowship with the Christian Reformed Church in North America in 2011. It has adopted the Heidelberg Catechism and Westminster Confession. It has 26 organised congregations and 7 mission stations with 3,000 members.
