= Christian Presbyterian Church =

US-based Christian denomination

- Classification: Protestant
- Orientation: Reformed
- Theology: Calvinist Evangelical
- Polity: Presbyterian
- Region: United States
- Origin: 1991
- Separated from: Christian Reformed Church in North America
- Separations: 1997: Korean Evangelical Presbyterian Church in America
- Merged into: Presbyterian Church in America
- Congregations: 20 (1993)
- Members: 6,000 members (1993)

The Christian Presbyterian Church (CPC) was a Presbyterian denomination formed in 1991 under the leadership of Rev. Dr. John E. Kim, by churches that separated from the Christian Reformed Church in North America (CRC) when it started to allow women's ordination.

In 1995, the founding pastor returned to South Korea, the denomination ceased to exist, and most of its churches merged into the Presbyterian Church in America.

Meanwhile, part of their churches formed the Korean Evangelical Presbyterian Church in America in 1997.

== History ==
In the 1990s, the Christian Reformed Church in North America (CRC) began to allow women's ordination. Such doctrinal change led to the formation of dissenting denominations. In 1991, a group of churches whose members were mostly of Korean ethnicity, under the leadership of Rev. Dr. John E. Kim, split off from CRC and formed the Christian Presbyterian Church. In 1993, the first synod was held of the denomination, which at the time consisted of 20 churches and 6,000 members.

In 1995, the founding pastor returned to South Korea, and the denomination ceased to exist. Consequently, most of their churches were absorbed into the Southwest Korean Presbytery of the Presbyterian Church in America. Other churches formed the Korean Evangelical Presbyterian Church in America in 1997.

== Interchurch Relations ==
In 2005, the Christian Reformed Church in North America welcomed Rev. Joseph Kyung Kim from the IPC as pastor of one of their churches.
