= Elmhurst, Illinois =

- City
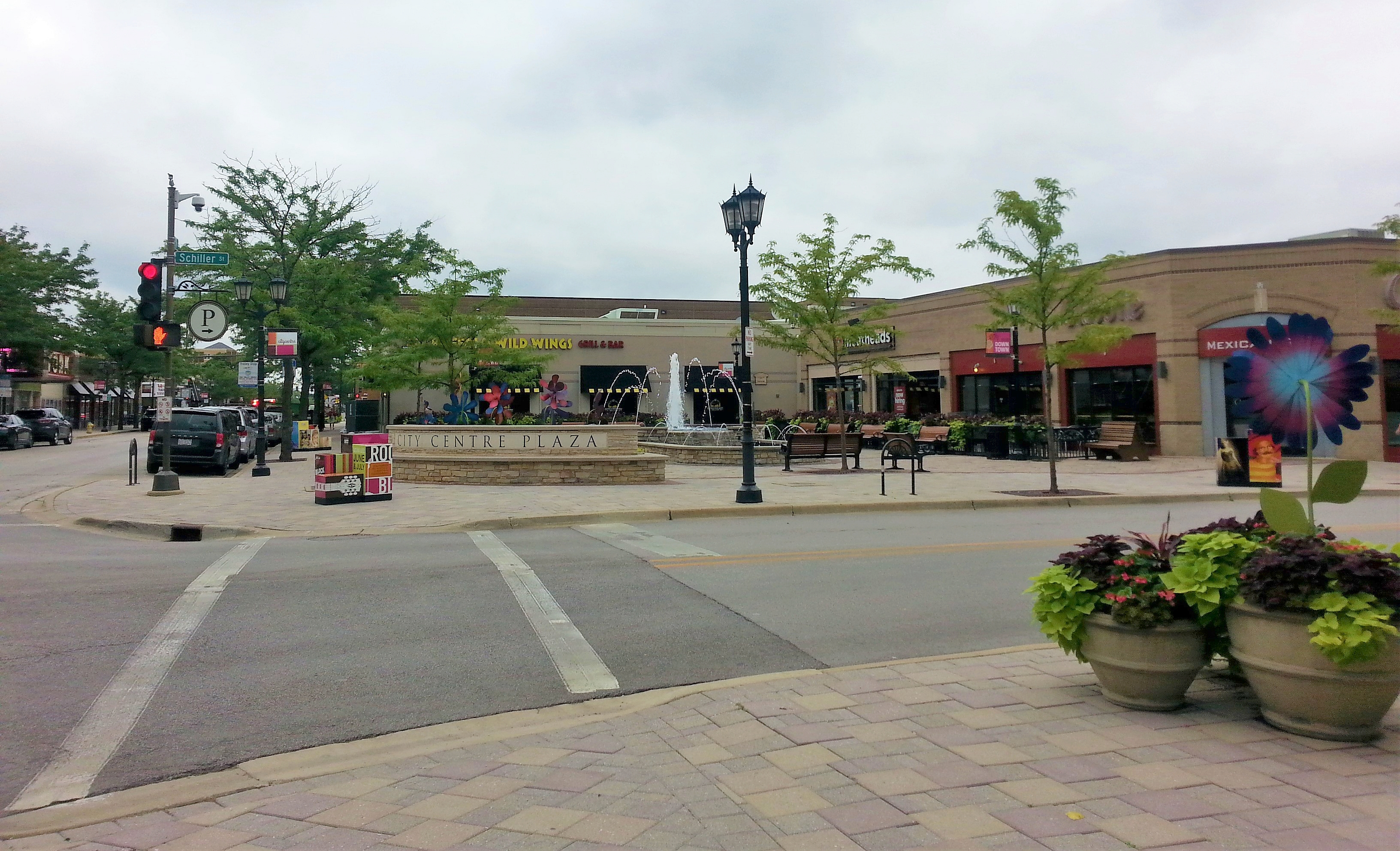
- Elmhurst City Center

- Flag Seal
- Mottoes: "Close to Everything, Unlike Anything"; "Ideal for your business, your family, your life"
- Interactive map of Elmhurst, Illinois
- Location within Greater Chicago Location within Illinois Location within the United States
- Coordinates: 41°53′02″N 87°56′34″W
- Country: United States
- State: Illinois
- Counties: DuPage, Cook
- Townships: Addison, York, and Proviso
- Incorporated: June 5, 1882

Government
  - Type: Council–manager

Area
  - Total: 10.28 sq mi (26.62 km^{2})
  - Land: 10.22 sq mi (26.47 km^{2})
  - Water: 0.058 sq mi (0.15 km^{2})
- Elevation: 689 ft (210 m)

Population (2020)
  - Total: 45,786
  - Density: 4,480.7/sq mi (1,730.02/km^{2})

Standard of living (2015-19)
  - Per capita income: $57,881
  - Median home value: $432,600
- Time zone: UTC-6 (Central)
  - Summer (DST): UTC-5 (Central)
- ZIP Code: 60126, 60127
- Area codes: 630 and 331
- FIPS code: 17-23620
- GNIS ID: 2394673

Elmhurst is a city in DuPage and Cook counties in the U.S. state of Illinois, and a western suburb of Chicago. The population was 45,786 at the 2020 census.

== History ==
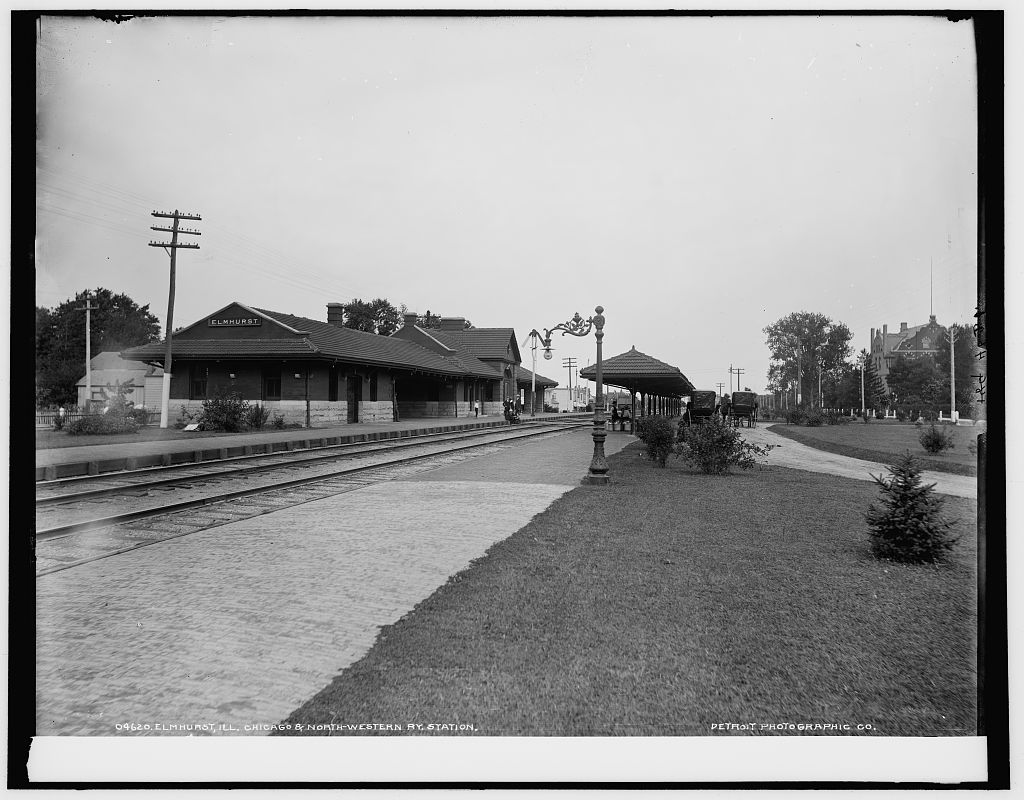
Elmhurst Station ca. 1890s

Members of the Potawatomi Native American people, who settled along Salt Creek just south of where the city would develop, are the earliest known settlers of the Elmhurst area. Around 1836, European-American immigrants settled on tracts of land along the same creek. At what would become Elmhurst City Centre, a native of Ohio named Gerry Bates established a community on a tract of "treeless land" in 1842.

The following year, Hill Cottage Tavern opened where St. Charles Road and Cottage Hill Avenue presently intersect. In 1845, the community was officially named Cottage Hill when a post office was established. Four years later, the Galena and Chicago Union Railroad was given right-of-way through the community, giving farmers easier access to Chicago. The first Elmhurst railroad station was built in 1894. The community changed its name to Elmhurst in 1869, and in 1871 Elmhurst University was organized. The land for Elmhurst University was gifted by prominent resident Thomas Barbour Bryan. Bryan (often referred to as the "Father of Elmhurst") played an important role in the development of the town, and has been as the one responsible for renaming the town.

Elmhurst was incorporated as a village in 1882, with a population between 723 and 1,050, and legal boundaries of St. Charles Road to North Avenue, and one half mile west and one quarter mile east of York Street. Elmhurst Memorial Hospital was founded in 1926 as the first hospital in DuPage County.

The Memorial Parade has run every Memorial Day since 1918. The annual Elmhurst St. Patrick's Day Parade continues to be the third largest parade of that sort in the Chicago area, following the more famous parades downtown and on the city's South Side.

Since 1964, it has been home to Elmhurst CRC, one of the largest congregations of the Christian Reformed Church in North America.

The Keebler Company's corporate headquarters was in Elmhurst until 2001, when the Kellogg Company purchased the company. The city is home to the headquarters of Sunshine Biscuits and McMaster-Carr Supply Co.

In 2014, Family Circle magazine ranked Elmhurst as one of the "Ten Best U.S. Towns for Families".

== Geography ==
According to the 2021 census gazetteer files, Elmhurst has a total area of 10.28 square miles (26.63 km^{2}), of which 10.22 square miles (26.47 km^{2}) (or 99.42%) is land and 0.06 square miles (0.16 km^{2}) (or 0.58%) is water.

Due to local topography, the town has had a tendency to flood in the past after large rainfalls; the city is currently undertaking a large effort to mitigate future flooding.

== Demographics ==
Historical population
Census	Pop.	Note	%±
1870	329		—
1880	723		119.8%
1890	1,050		45.2%
1900	1,728		64.6%
1910	2,360		36.6%
1920	4,594		94.7%
1930	14,055		205.9%
1940	15,458		10.0%
1950	21,273		37.6%
1960	36,991		73.9%
1970	46,392		25.4%
1980	44,276		−4.6%
1990	42,029		−5.1%
2000	42,762		1.7%
2010	44,121		3.2%
2020	45,786		3.8%
U.S. Census Bureau

=== Racial and ethnic composition ===
Elmhurst city, Illinois – Racial and ethnic composition Note: the US Census treats Hispanic/Latino as an ethnic category. This table excludes Latinos from the racial categories and assigns them to a separate category. Hispanics/Latinos may be of any race.
Race / Ethnicity (NH = Non-Hispanic)	Pop 2000	Pop 2010	Pop 2020	% 2000	% 2010	% 2020
White alone (NH)	38,706	37,549	35,971	90.51%	85.10%	78.56%
Black or African American alone (NH)	388	815	931	0.91%	1.85%	2.03%
Native American or Alaska Native alone (NH)	17	27	41	0.04%	0.06%	0.09%
Asian alone (NH)	1,562	2,244	2,942	3.65%	5.09%	6.43%
Pacific Islander alone (NH)	7	4	7	0.02%	0.01%	0.02%
Other race alone (NH)	26	42	148	0.06%	0.10%	0.32%
Mixed race or Multiracial (NH)	339	542	1,477	0.79%	1.23%	3.23%
Hispanic or Latino (any race)	1,717	2,898	4,269	4.02%	6.57%	9.32%
Total	42,762	44,121	45,786	100.00%	100.00%	100.00%

=== 2020 census ===
As of the 2020 census, Elmhurst had a population of 45,786. The population density was 4,454.76 inhabitants per square mile (1,719.99/km^{2}). There were 17,260 housing units at an average density of 1,679.32 per square mile (648.39/km^{2}); 5.5% were vacant, with a homeowner vacancy rate of 2.5% and a rental vacancy rate of 7.5%.

There were 16,317 households, of which 36.4% had children under the age of 18 living in them. Of all households, 61.7% were married-couple households, 12.7% were households with a male householder and no spouse or partner present, and 22.0% were households with a female householder and no spouse or partner present. About 23.7% of all households were made up of individuals and 12.6% had someone living alone who was 65 years of age or older; 12,110 were families.

The median age was 40.6 years. 25.1% of residents were under the age of 18, 8.6% were from 18 to 24, 21.3% were from 25 to 44, 28.4% were from 45 to 64, and 16.8% were 65 years of age or older. For every 100 females there were 94.9 males, and for every 100 females age 18 and over there were 91.3 males age 18 and over.

100.0% of residents lived in urban areas, while 0.0% lived in rural areas.

Racial composition as of the 2020 census
Race	Number	Percent
White	36,844	80.5%
Black or African American	982	2.1%
American Indian and Alaska Native	120	0.3%
Asian	2,982	6.5%
Native Hawaiian and Other Pacific Islander	8	0.0%
Some other race	1,338	2.9%
Two or more races	3,512	7.7%
Hispanic or Latino (of any race)	4,269	9.3%

=== Income ===
The median income for a household in the city was $123,869, and the median income for a family was $148,663. Males had a median income of $83,584 versus $46,935 for females. The per capita income for the city was $59,911. About 2.1% of families and 3.4% of the population were below the poverty line, including 3.0% of those under age 18 and 4.5% of those age 65 or over.

== Economy ==
=== Top employers ===
According to Elmhurst's 2023 Annual Comprehensive Financial Report, the top employers in the city are:

#	Employer	# of Employees
1	Edward-Elmhurst Healthcare	2,800
2	Elmhurst CUSD 205	1,174
3	McMaster-Carr Supply Company	800
4	Elmhurst University	688
5	Brandenburg Industrial Service Co	300
6	Semblex Corporation	300
7	City of Elmhurst	291
8	FedEx Freight	200
9	Superior Ambulance	200
10	Power Distributing, LLC	180

== Arts and culture ==
- The Theatre Historical Society of America is focused on the preservation of dance, opera, and movie theaters and includes a collection of objects from many theaters that are no longer in existence. Among the items on display is a scale model of the 1927 Avalon Theater (now known as the New Regal Theater).
- Wilder Park Conservatory
- A 150-foot-deep (46 m) limestone quarry covering about 59 acres (240,000 m^{2}) is located half a mile west of downtown along West Avenue and 1st Street. A tunnel from Salt Creek diverts water into the quarry in case of a flood. The Salt Creek Trail is also accessible from the area. The quarry is an important piece of DuPage County's stormwater management system, and can hold up to 8,300 acre-feet (10 million cubic meters) of stormwater.
- Each spring, the company RGL Marketing for the Arts runs the event, Art in Wilder Park. The event takes place in centrally located Wilder Park, which is also home to the Wilder Mansion, the Elmhurst Public Library, the Wilder Park Conservatory and the Lizzadro Museum of Lapidary Art. The event "features of a juried show of fine arts, crafts and original creations of over 100 artists, including jewelry, glass, ceramics, painting, wood, photography, sculpture, paper and mixed media." The event also hosts live music and entertainment and over 40 food vendors.
- Elmhurst is home to multiple residential homes built by significant architects, including but not limited to Mies van der Rohe (McCormick House), Frank Lloyd Wright (F.B. Henderson House), Walter Burley Griffin (William H. Emery House, Sloane House), and R. Harold Zook.

== Government ==
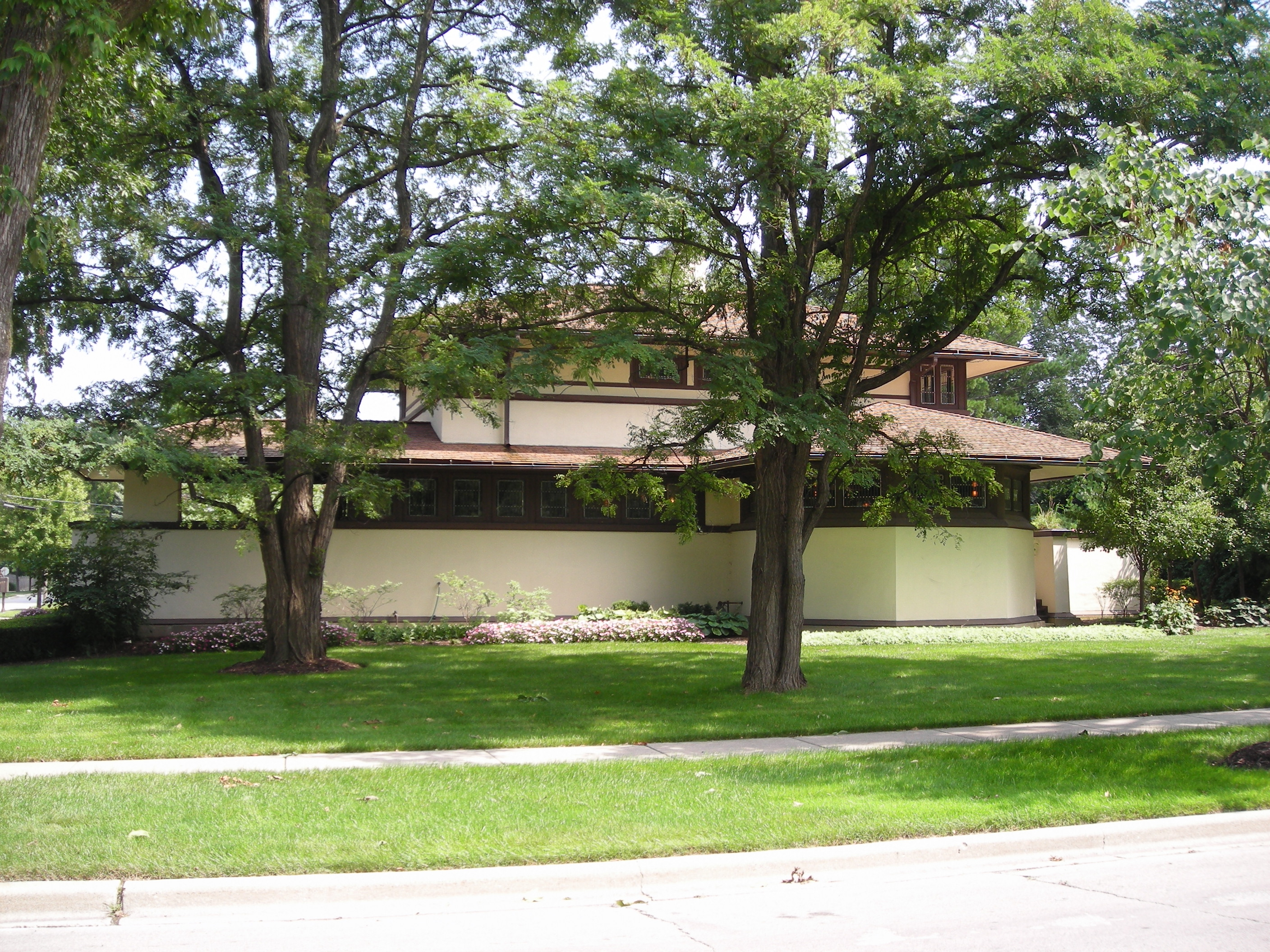
The F.B. Henderson House in Elmhurst was designed by Frank Lloyd Wright in 1901.

Timeline for Elmhurst's leadership:

- 1882 - Incorporated as a village in June.
- 1882 - Henry Glos elected as first village president.
- 1887 - Peter Wolf elected as village president.
- 1902 - Edwin Heidemann elected as village president.
- 1905 - Henry C. Schumacher elected as village president.
- 1908 - C. J. Albert elected as village president.
- 1910 - Adopted city form of government.
- 1910 - Henry C. Schumacher elected as first city mayor.
- 1912 - F. W. M. Hammerschmidt elected as mayor.
- 1919 - Otto Balgemann elected as mayor.
- 1931 - Edward Blatter elected as mayor.
- 1933 - Claude Van Auken elected as mayor.
- 1945 - William S. Fellows elected as mayor.
- 1951 - Ervin F. Wilson elected as mayor.
- 1957 - Benjamin Allison elected as mayor.
- 1961 - Charles Weigel elected as mayor.
- 1973 - Ray W. Fick Jr. elected as mayor.
- 1977 - Abner Ganet elected as mayor.
- 1985 - Robert J. Quinn elected as mayor.
- 1989 - Charles H. Garrigues elected as mayor.
- 1993 - Thomas D. Marcucci elected as mayor.
- 2009 - Peter P. DiCianni elected as mayor.
- 2013 - Steven Morley elected as mayor.
- 2021 - Scott M. Levin elected as mayor.

== Education ==
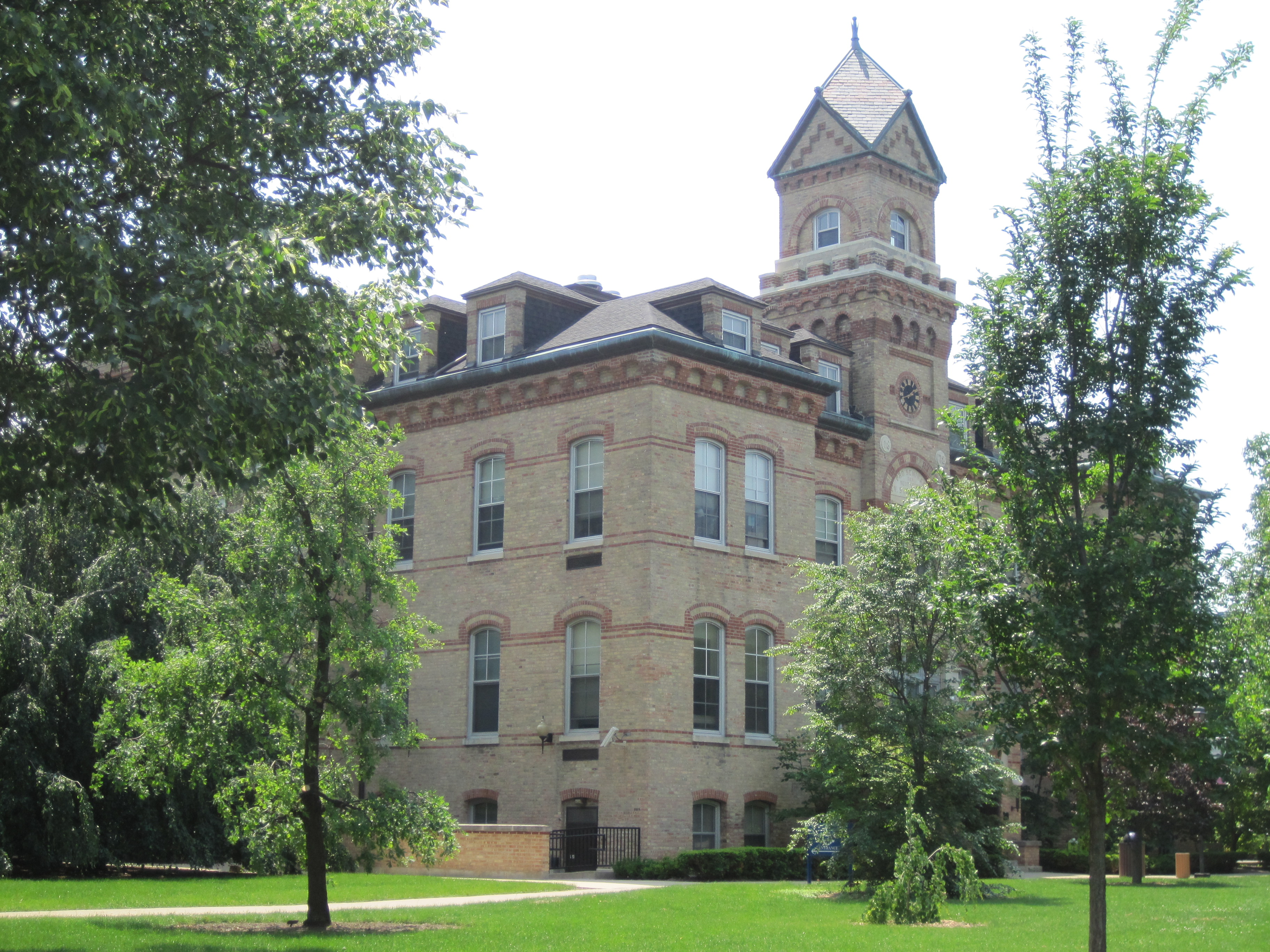
The Old Main building at Elmhurst University dates to 1878.

Elmhurst University is a local college of the area. It is a four-year private liberal arts college affiliated with the United Church of Christ.

School districts serving Elmhurst include:

- Elmhurst Community Unit School District 205 serves most of the city; its high school is York Community High School
- Villa Park School District 45
- Salt Creek School District 48
- DuPage High School District 88 (Salt Creek and Villa Park SDs feed into this one)
- Hillside School District 93 serves the Cook County portion; in 1953 this portion had 45 houses
- Students at Hillside 93 move on to Proviso West High School of the Proviso Township High Schools District 209.

Private schools:

- IC Catholic Prep, formerly Immaculate Conception High School
- Timothy Christian School
- Immaculate Conception Grade School
- Immanuel Lutheran Grade School
- Visitation Catholic Grade School

== Infrastructure ==
=== Transportation ===
Elmhurst is served by Pace buses, and the Metra Union Pacific West Line through the Elmhurst station. The Union Pacific Railroad has freight service on the Metra line and the Canadian National Railway serves the former Illinois Central line south of the Metra line, known as the Freeport Subdivision. O'Hare International Airport is roughly 18 minutes from Elmhurst, and Chicago Midway International Airport is roughly 33 minutes from Elmhurst.

During the summers and December, Elmhurst also has the "Elmhurst Express Trolley", a free weekend trolley that connects downtown Elmhurst to the Spring Road businesses and the Elmhurst Public Library. It runs Friday-Saturday and the $40,000 cost comes out of visiting and tourism fund.

==== Former services ====
Elmhurst was previously served by the Chicago Aurora and Elgin Railroad, an electric interurban rail line. The station opened in 1902 as "South Elmhurst" until being renamed to "York St." The station closed in 1959 after the CA&E ceased operations. The Illinois Prairie Path now runs over the former line. The Chicago Great Western also served Elmhurst. It had commuter rail between Grand Central Station and DeKalb until 1906.
