= CRC =

CRC may refer to:

== Science and technology ==
- Carboniferous Rainforest Collapse, an event at the end of the Carboniferous period
- Class-responsibility-collaboration card, used as a brainstorming tool in the design of object-oriented software
- Clinical research coordinator, responsible for conducting clinical trials
- Colorectal cancer, the development of cancer in the colon or rectum
- CRC Energy Efficiency Scheme, formerly the Carbon Reduction Commitment, a UK wide scheme designed to increase energy efficiency in large energy users
- CRC Handbook of Chemistry and Physics, a science reference handbook published by CRC Press
- CRC Standard Mathematical Tables, a mathematics reference handbook published by CRC Press
- Cyclic redundancy check, a type of hash function used to produce a checksum in order to detect errors in data storage or transmission

== Organizations ==
- California Rehabilitation Center, a state prison in the United States Of America
- Canadian Red Cross
- Capital Research Center, an American conservative non-profit organization
- Censorship Review Committee, which meets to discuss censorship in Singapore
- Central Revolutionary Committee (French: Comité révolutionnaire central), an extinct French political party
- Civilian Response Corps, deployable American federal civilian employees who provide reconstruction and stabilization assistance
- Commission for Rural Communities, a United Kingdom public body
- Committee on the Rights of the Child, which reports on implementation of the UN Convention on the Rights of the Child
  - Convention on the Rights of the Child, of the United Nations
- Communications Research Centre Canada, an agency of Industry Canada
- Communist, Republican, and Citizen Group, a French parliamentary group
- Community Rehabilitation Company, a private-sector suppliers of offender rehabilitation services in England and Wales
- Constitutional Research Council, a Unionist, pro-Brexit funding organisation in Scotland and Northern Ireland
- Control and Reporting Centre, part of the Air Force control and reporting system in most NATO countries
- Civil Rights Congress, a United States civil rights organization from 1946 until 1956

=== Religion ===
- CRC Churches International, a Pentecostal Protestant Christian denomination located primarily in Australasia
- Central Rabbinical Congress, a Haredi group
- Chicago Rabbinical Council
- Christian Reformed Church (disambiguation)
- Christian Revival Church, a Charismatic, Pentecostal and holistic Evangelical movement group
- Ligue de la contre-réforme catholique

=== Education and research ===
- Cambridge Regional College, a further education college
- Center for Research and Communication, a Philippine think-tank that later became the University of Asia and the Pacific
- Cooperative Research Centre, a type of hybrid academic/industry research body existing in Australia
- Collaborative Research Centres, a type of publicly funded research body to advance basic research existing in Germany
- Cosumnes River College, a two-year community college in Sacramento, California
- Crowley's Ridge College, a Christian college in Paragould, Arkansas
- Cyclotron Research Center and Cyclotron Resource Center, particle accelerator complex at the University of Louvain, Belgium
- Georgia Tech Campus Recreation Center, the Rec center at Georgia Tech

=== Companies ===
- California Resources Corporation, a petroleum and natural gas company
- Chicago Recording Company, a recording studio in Chicago
- China Record Corporation, a large record company, based in Beijing
- China Resources (operated CRC Supermarkets)
- China Resources Cement, a cement company parented by China Resources
- Columbia Record Club, a mail-order music club offered by Columbia Records
- Computer Research Corporation, an early minicomputer manufacturer
- CRC-Evans, a pipeline-construction company owned by Stanley Black & Decker
- CRC Health Group, provider of addiction treatment and educational programs for adults and youth
- CRC Industries, a worldwide manufacturer of specialist industrial chemicals
- CRC Press, publisher, originally the Chemical Rubber Company
- Customer relation centre, a common company department

== Places ==
- Costa Rica (FIFA and IOC code)
- Camp Red Cloud, a US Army Camp in Uijeongbu, South Korea
- Santa Ana Airport (Colombia), IATA code CRC
- Ciracas LRT station, a light rail station in Jakarta, Indonesia

== Sports ==
- Canadian Rally Championship, a rally racing tournament
- Canadian Ringette Championships, a national ringette tournament
- Canadian Rugby Championship, a rugby union tournament
- Capablanca Random Chess, a 10x8 chess variant
- Collegiate Rugby Championship, a rugby sevens tournament

== Other uses ==
- Canada Research Chair, Canadian university research professorships
- Costa Rican colón, the ISO 4217 currency of Costa Rica
- Crc (protein), catabolite repression control protein
- Criminal record check

== See also ==
- Cross Racing Championship Extreme 2005 (CRC 2005), a car-racing game developed by Invictus Games
