= Korean Evangelical Presbyterian Church in America =

- Classification: Protestant
- Orientation: Reformed
- Theology: Calvinist Evangelical
- Polity: Presbyterian
- Region: United States
- Origin: 1997
- Separated from: Christian Presbyterian Church
- Congregations: 26 (2002)
- Official website: www.kepca.org

The Korean Evangelical Presbyterian Church in America (KEPCA) - in Korean 미주복음주의장로회 - is a Presbyterian denomination, formed in 1997, by churches previously linked to Christian Presbyterian Church, when it dissolved.

In 2021 Rev. Kwang-Chun Jang was elected president of the denomination.

== History ==
In the 1990s, the Christian Reformed Church in North America (ICRAN) began to allow women's ordination. Such doctrinal change led to the formation of dissenting denominations. In 1991, a group of churches whose members were mostly from Korean ethnicity, under the leadership of Rev. Dr. John E. Kim, split off from ICRAN and formed the Christian Presbyterian Church (IPC) . In 1993, the first synod was held of the denomination, which at the time consisted of 20 churches and 6,000 members.

In 1995, the founding pastor of the IPC returned to South Korea and the denomination ceased to exist. Consequently, most of their churches were absorbed into the Southwest Korean Presbytery of Presbyterian Church in America. Other churches were not part of this union and formed the Korean Evangelical Presbyterian Church in America, in 1997.

In 2021 Rev. Kwang-Chun Jang was elected president of the denomination.

== Structure ==
The denomination is made up of about 4 presbyteries and 26 churches.

== Doctrine ==
The denomination practices women's ordination as missionaries.
