= Timmermans =

Timmermans is a Dutch occupational surname meaning "carpenter's". It is a common name with (in 2007) 11,658 and 6,663 carriers in the Netherlands and Belgium, respectively. People with this surname include:

- Ans Timmermans (1919–1958), Dutch freestyle swimmer
- Brian Timmermans (b. 1997), Dutch karateka
- Christiaan Timmermans (b. 1941), Dutch law professor and judge
- Eimbert Timmermans (b. 1961), Dutch sidecarcross rider
- Felix Timmermans (1886–1947), Belgian author
- Frans Timmermans (b. 1961), Dutch politician
- Jesse Timmermans (b. 1989), Dutch tennis player
- Nathalie Timmermans (b. 1989), Dutch softball player
- Nicolas Timmermans (b. 1982), Belgian football defender
- Pieter Timmermans (b. 1964), Belgian businessman, regent of the National Bank of Belgium
- Steven R. Timmermans (b. 1957), American CEO of the Christian Reformed Church in North America
- Theo Timmermans (1926–2004), Dutch football forward
- Theo Timmermans (b. 1989) Dutch football goalkeeper
