= CrcZ =

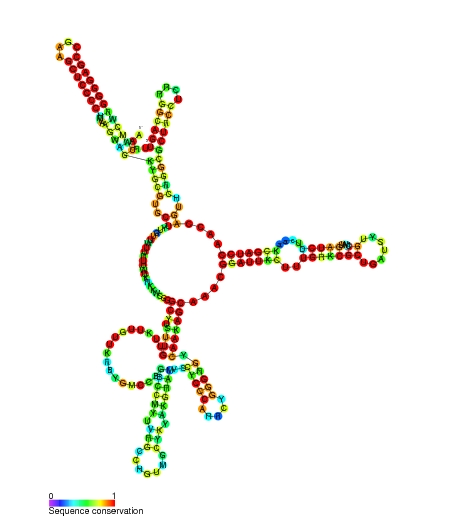
- Predicted secondary structure and sequence conservation of CrcZ

Identifiers
- Symbol: CrcZ
- Alt. Symbols: P29
- Rfam: RF01675

Other data
- RNA type: sRNA
- Domain: Bacteria
- GO: GO:0045013
- SO: SO:0001263
- PDB structures: PDBe

CrcZ is a small RNA found in Pseudomonas bacteria, which acts as a global regulator of carbon catabolite repression. In P. aeruginosa, CrcZ is responsible for sequestering the protein Crc. Crc is an RNA-binding global regulator, which acts by inhibiting the translation of the transcriptional regulator AlkS.

== Function ==
In P. aeruginosa, CrcZ is a 407-nt long RNA which contains 5 CA-rich motifs. CrcZ expression is regulated by the two-component system CbrA/CbrB, in response to the availability of different carbon sources. As the Crc protein inhibits translation of transcriptional regulators by binding to and occluding the translational initiation site, sequestration of Crc by CrcZ binding means that Crc is unable to inhibit translation and transcriptional regulators, such as AlkS, are freely translated. Expression of CrcZ is dependent on the carbon sources available to the bacteria; in the presence of preferred carbon sources (such as succinate), CrcZ expression is low, and catabolite repression is high. In the presence of poor sources of carbon, such as mannitol, CrcZ expression is high, allowing the inhibition of Crc and a subsequent decrease in catabolite repression occurs.
