= Sidney Greidanus =

American pastor and biblical scholar (born 1935)

Sidney Greidanus (born 1935) is an American pastor and biblical scholar.

== Education ==
Greidanus studied at Calvin College and Calvin Theological Seminary before obtaining a Th.D. from the Free University in Amsterdam. He served as pastor in the Christian Reformed Church and taught at Calvin College and The King's College before becoming professor of preaching at Calvin Theological Seminary in 1990.

== Career ==
Greidanus is best known for his emphasis on preaching Christ from Old Testament texts. He outlined his method for doing this in Preaching Christ from the Old Testament (1999). Following the Dutch homiletician Tjeerd Hoekstra, he wrote, "a sermon without Christ is no sermon". Greidanus followed this up with Preaching Christ from Genesis (2007), Preaching Christ from Ecclesiastes (2010), and Preaching Christ from Daniel (2012). His newest work in the series, Preaching Christ from the Psalms, came out in September 2016.

His other works include The Modern Preacher and the Ancient Text: Interpreting and Preaching Biblical Literature (1989), Sola Scriptura: Problems and Principles in Preaching Historical Texts (2001), and The Beginning and End of Wisdom: Preaching Christ from the First and Last Chapters of Proverbs, Ecclesiastes, and Job co-authored with Douglas Sean O'Donnell (2011).

He has been described as "one of the most important and influential authors today in the area of biblical preaching."
