= First Christian Reformed Church of Toronto =

Church in Toronto, Canada

Coordinates: 43.707822°N 79.388088°W

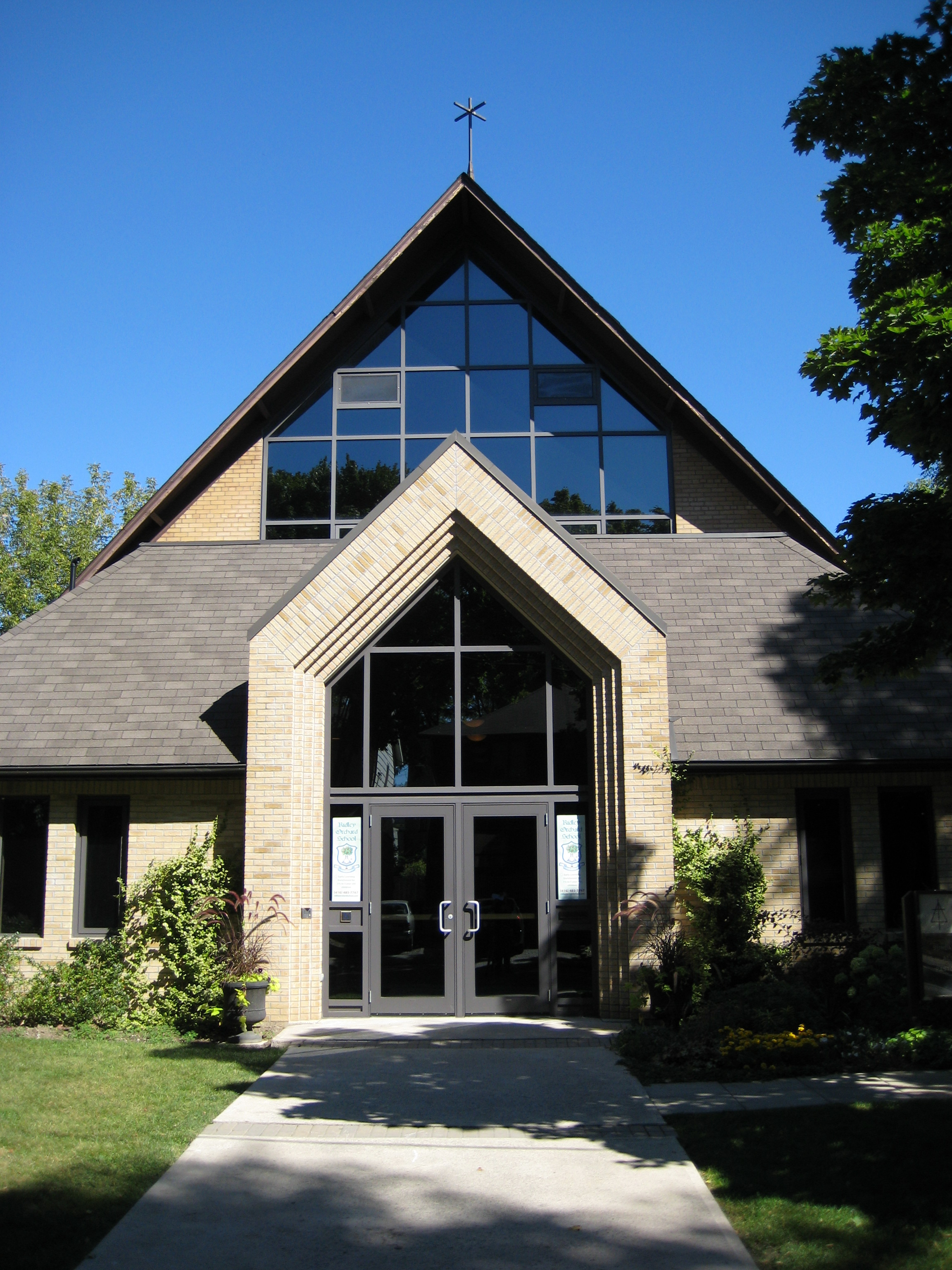
First Christian Reformed Church of Toronto

The First Christian Reformed Church of Toronto is a congregation of the Christian Reformed Church in North America in Toronto, Ontario, Canada. It is one of the more liberal churches in its classis and the denomination. It was the first CRC parish to call a woman minister and declared itself open to gays and lesbians in committed relationships serving as deacons and elders. This was later rescinded in the face of pressure from the Toronto Classis (the leaders of Christian Reformed churches in the area).
