= Elmhurst Christian Reformed Church =

Church in Illinois, United States

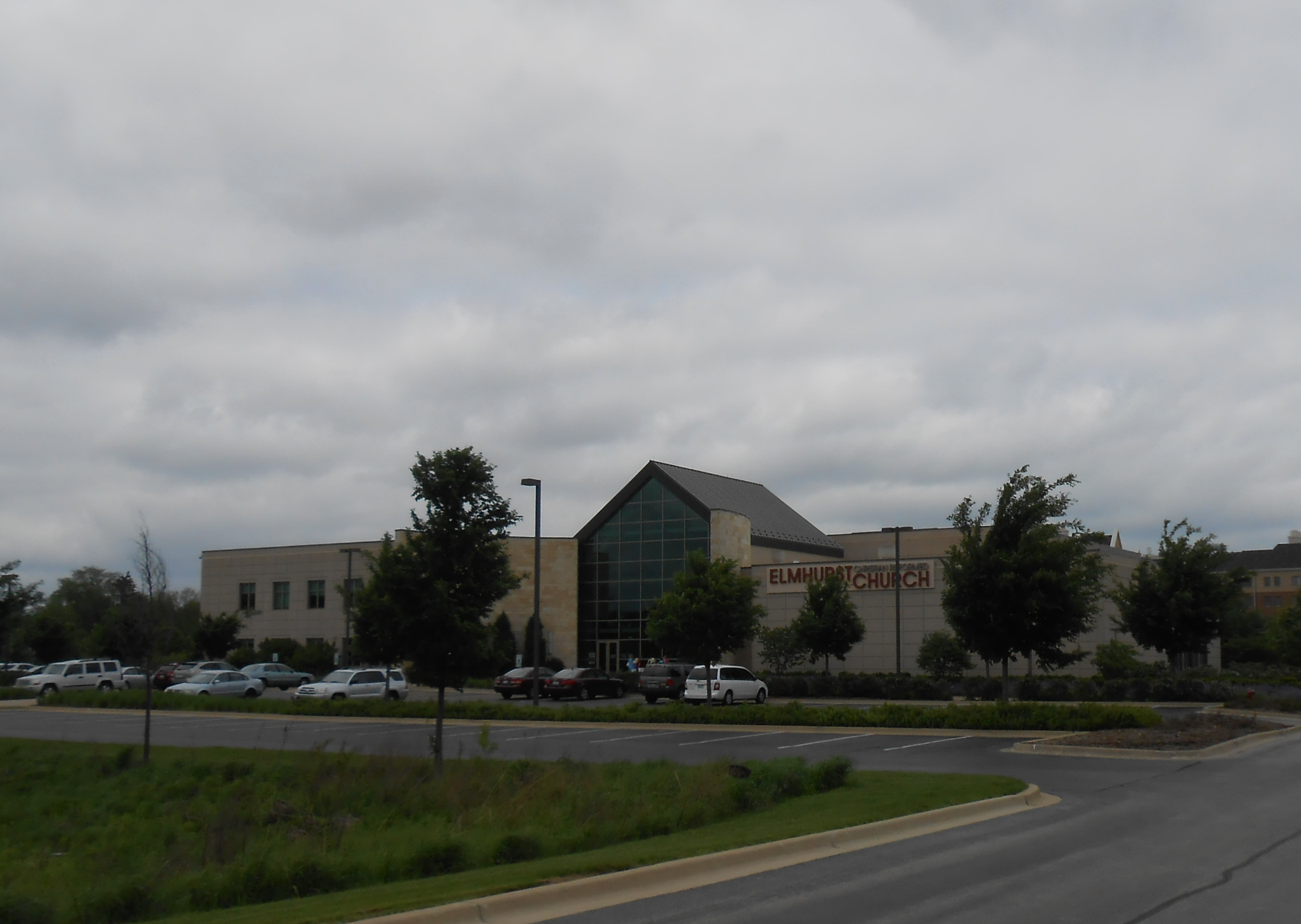
- ECRC's present home in Elmhurst
- Elmhurst Christian Reformed Church
- Location: 149 West Brush Hill Road, Elmhurst, IL 60126
- Country: United States
- Denomination: Christian Reformed
- Website: elmhurstcrc.org/

History
- Founded: 1924 (Organized as a CRC congregation in 1949)
- Founder: Katherine Lubben Tessman

Architecture
- Architect: Goss/Pasma Blomquist Architects
- Style: Modern
- Years built: 2009

Administration
- Division: Region Nine

Elmhurst Christian Reformed Church is a congregation of the Christian Reformed Church in North America located on the southern edge of Elmhurst, Illinois. It was founded in 1924 as a Baptist mission in Bellwood. After moving to Elmhurst in 1964, the congregation constructed a large building just off Roosevelt Road.

== History ==
Elmhurst Christian Reformed Church was founded in the Chicago suburb of Bellwood.

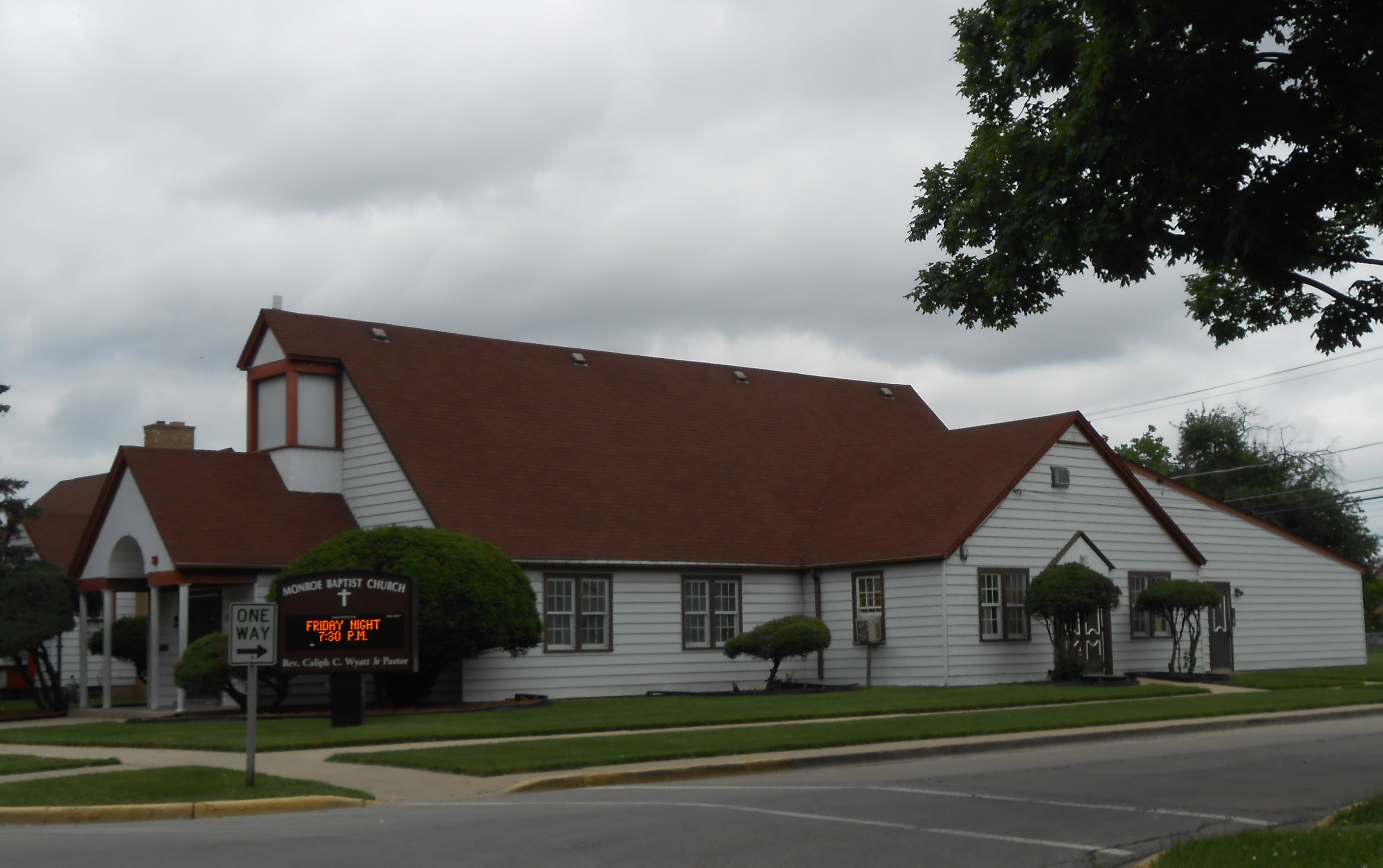
The building where the congregation first meet in Bellwood, Illinois.

Land was later purchased on the corner of Kent Avenue and East Van Buren Street in Elmhurst. Jay De Vries was the pastor of the congregation when it moved to Elmhurst in 1964. The congregation of about sixty families renamed itself Elmhurst Christian Reformed Church. De Vries was followed by pastors Garrett Stoutmeyer, Wayne Leys, and Bert De Jong. Peter Semeyn took over as the senior pastor in 2011. On June 14, 1990, the church's steeple was struck by lightning igniting a fire that caused severe damage. The congregation met in several other facilities until it rebuilt. The church had around 1,000 members in the mid-1990s. By the late 1990s and early 2000s the church had annexed several nearby properties. In 2009 it moved again to a new building a few blocks to the south. The original Elmhurst property was sold to the Diocese of Southwest America of the Malankara Orthodox Syrian Church for use as a new parish church building. By 2012 the church had a membership of 1,542, making it one of the largest congregations in the denomination.

== Current and former locations ==
- 3501 Monroe Street, Bellwood, Illinois 41.8772115°N 87.8758211°W
  - Bellwood Gospel Tabernacle (1920-1924)
  - Light of the World Rescue Mission (1924-1944)
  - Bellwood Chapel (1944-1949)
  - First Christian Reform Church of Bellwood (1949-1964)
- 905 South Kent Avenue, Elmhurst, Illinois 41.871737°N 87.937826°W
  - Elmhurst Christian Reformed Church (1964-2009)
- 149 West Brush Hill Road, Elmhurst, Illinois 41.8626444°N 87.9409539°W
  - Elmhurst Christian Reformed Church (2009–Present)
