= Johanna Veenstra =

American missionary to Nigeria (1894-1933)

Johanna Veenstra (1894–1933) was the first missionary of the Christian Reformed Church (CRC) to go to Nigeria.

== Biography ==
She was born on Thursday, April 19, 1894, on Hopper Street in Paterson, New Jersey. Her parents were William Veenstra, later a Christian Reformed pastor, and Cornelia Anna De Hoop. In 1915 she was working as a secretary in New York when she was challenged by Karl Kumm of the Sudan United Mission (SUM) to be a missionary in Africa and joined the Union Missionary Training Institute. She also studied at Calvin University and took on a midwifery course in New York.

On October 2, 1919, she left New York City on the Mauretania for England. On December 31, 1919, she took another ship to Africa, arriving in Lagos in January 1920. In February 1921, she arrived at her station in Lupwe, which is near Takum, now in Taraba State. Two years later, Veenstra assumed leadership of the work in Lupwe. She was engaged primarily in medical work and in preaching. She and her colleague Miss Haigh opened a school and medical dispensary. During her ministry in Lupwe, a number of people especially of the Kuteb people became Christian. The roots of the Christian Reformed Church of Nigeria (CRCN) and the Reform Church of Christ in Nigeria (RCCN) Headquarters in Takum, Taraba State Nigeria lay in part in the work of Veenstra.

In March 1933, Veenstra became ill. She traveled to the Sudan United Mission hospital in Vom, which is in present-day Plateau State. On Palm Sunday, April 9, 1933, Veenstra died of appendicitis and was buried in Vom.

In addition to her missionary work in Nigeria, Veenstra is significant for presenting the mission needs of Nigeria to the Christian Reformed Church. In 1940, this church adopted Nigeria as a mission field. Today, the Christian Reformed Church of Nigeria is a strong independent African church. Veenstra Hall at Calvin University is named after her, as is the seminary of the CRCN, Veenstra Seminary located in Donga.

Her papers are held at Hekman Library at Calvin University.

== Bibliography ==
- Beets, Henry. Johanna of Nigeria. Grand Rapids: Grand Rapids Printing Company, 1937.
- Palmer, Timothy. The Reformed and Presbyterian Faith: A View from Nigeria. Bukuru: TCNN Publications, 1996. (Available from Africa Christian Textbooks.)
- Pearce, Winifred Mary. Johanna Veenstra. London and Edinburgh: Oliphants Ltd., 1957 (Heroes of the Cross); Grand Rapids, MI: Zondervan Publishing House, 1957 (Heroes of the Cross).
- Smith, Edgar. Nigerian Harvest. Grand Rapids: Baker Book House, 1972.
- Veenstra, Johanna. Pioneering for Christ in the Sudan. Grand Rapids: Smitter Book Co., 1926.
