= Christian Reformed Church in Sierra Leone =

Christian denomination in Sierra Leone

The Christian Reformed Church in Sierra Leone is a Protestant Reformed denomination in Sierra Leone. It grew out of missions and development work of the Christian Reformed Church of North America that began in the late 1970s.

== History ==
World Missions and the World Relief Committee of the Christian Reformed Church in North America began to work in Sierra Leone in the late 1970s. In 1992 the church conducted weekly worship services in 14 villages, the attendance was 1,000. A civil war broke out in the early 1990s. During the civil war many missionaries from various denominations left; the war ended in 2001. After the war Christian Reformed World Missions renewed its evangelism effort through partnership with the Reformed Church in Zambia led by Pastor Phiri, this work had led 36 congregations. and the Christian Reformed mission was developed, the church ministered in the Kuranko speaking people in Sierra Leone's northern Kuinadodu district by 2006.

In February 2007 the Christian Reformed Church in Sierra Leone was registered by the government. While there were no churches in this area in 1980, by 2004 there were 18 congregations and 1,100 people attending the services. Now the church has 62 congregations and 6,000 members.

According to Rev. Piri, who is the coordinator of church development, the denominations 62 congregation is located in the Koinadugu, Tonkolili, Bombali, Bo and the Western Districts of Sierra Leone. Although the Christian Reformed Church in Sierra Leone was started among Kuranko people, it has extended to the Mende and Limba tribes, and now with Rochen Mara, to the Temne people too.

In addition there are more than 65 leaders in the church trained in the Timothy Leadership Institute.

The church has several outreaches and church planting ministry in Bendugu and Rochen.

In 2013 Rev Piri was replaced by Rev Ifstifanus B. Bahago. He will help oversee the ministry in Sierra Leone and organise its ministries. The denomination is growing steadily.

== Theology ==
- Apostles Creed
- Athanasian Creed
- Belgic Confession
- Canons of Dort
- Heidelberg Catechism
- Nicene Creed
