= Gijsbert Haan =

Leader in the secession of Dutch-Americans from the Reformed Church in America

Gijsbert Haan or alternate spelling Gysbert Haan (January 3, 1801 – July 27, 1874) was the leader in the 1857 Secession of Dutch-Americans from the Reformed Church in America, and the creator of the Christian Reformed Church in the United States and Canada.

Gijsbert Haan

== Life prior to secession ==
Born in Hilversum, North Holland, Netherlands on January 3, 1801, Gijsbert grew up as a member of the Reformed Church in Hilversum. He was married to Marritje Pos (September 28, 1800 - August 26, 1876) after he learned that she was pregnant due to an affair several months before. Over the course of their marriage, they had at least 13 children, 10 of whom survived into adulthood. On July 26, 1847, due to social and religious persecution as well as severe famine, Haan and his family emigrated from the Netherlands on the passenger ship Centurion. Under the guidance of Albertus van Raalte they established a colony in Holland, Michigan. In 1850 they aligned themselves with the Reformed Church in America (RCA). At that point, they were considered to be a classis (a "governing body of a group of churches in the Reformed system, made up of clergymen [and] ruling elders...") within the RCA.

Although most churches within the classis were content with their affiliation to the RCA, one church under the leadership of Haan found that the RCA was inadequate. Haan warned that the RCA "was not sound". This was reminiscent of a former schism in the Netherlands when the Reformed Churches in the Netherlands separated from the Dutch Reformed Church because of its supposed "theological laxity". Over time, dissension began to grow largely due to Haan's preaching against the RCA.

== Secession ==
In 1857 Haan's followers sent documents of secession to the classis in an attempt to garner support for an exodus from the RCA. The principal arguments in the document were that the RCA conducted "open communion", sang hymns whose lyrics were not based on Biblical psalms, overlooked catechism preaching, and did not support the secession in the Netherlands. Although the classis did not approve of the secession documents, one church did decide to leave the RCA in January 1857. Soon, other churches followed suit. In 1859 these secessionist churches became the True Dutch Reformed Church. The denomination then endured several name changes until 1904 when it adopted its present name, the Christian Reformed Church (CRC).

The CRC began as a Dutch immigrant church in the 1850s and continued to attract mainly Dutch constituents. The church population has increased at times of heavy Dutch immigration. The church in Canada gained new members after an influx of people from the Netherlands following World War II. The CRC has also gained members who were unhappy with and left the RCA for various reasons. For example, some people who were unhappy with the RCA's decision to permit members to join the Freemasons united with the CRC in the 1880s. On the other hand, the CRC also lost several congregations in 1882 that supported the Freemasons.

== Post-secession ==
Haan continued to preach in the newly founded CRC until his death in 1874. Some of his children and many of his grandchildren and great-grandchildren became leaders in the CRC. His great-granddaughter Irene, served on the faculty at Hope College. Most of the congregations consisted of immigrants. Therefore, services were held in the Dutch language in the early years. By the turn of the 20th century, CRC congregations could be found in several US states with services held in both Dutch and English. Haan died in 1874 of liver disease in Grand Rapids, Michigan.
