= Presbyterian and Reformed Church of Costa Rica =

Protestant church

- Classification: Protestant
- Orientation: Reformed
- Theology: Calvinist
- Polity: Presbyterian
- Region: Costa Rica
- Origin: 1984
- Branched from: Christian Reformed Church of North America
- Congregations: 5 (2017)
- Official website: www.iprcostarica.org

The Presbyterian and Reformed Church of Costa Rica (PRCR) - in Spanish Iglesia Presbiteriana y Reformada de Costa Rica -, formerly known as Reformed Christian Church in Costa Rica, is a Presbyterian denomination, established in Costa Rica in 1984, by missionaries of the Christian Reformed Church in North America.

== History ==
In 1984, missionaries from the Christian Reformed Church in North America began a church planting work in Honduras and Nicaragua. A group of missionaries also decided to plant churches in Costa Rica, among them was Pastor Guillermo Green and his wife Aletha. Together with the recent convert, Roberto Venegas, they work in the Guadalupe sector. Two churches were formed, in Tepeyac and in Los Cuadros, Purral Arriba.

Roberto Venegas was later ordained and took over the pastorship of the congregation in Tepeyac.

Another missionary sent to the country was Marvin Briceño, who pastored the church in Los Cuadros. After this, the mission of the Christian Reformed Church of North America began to work in several places, including San José, Alajuela and Puntarenas. However, the missionary effort did not continue, and the mission ended its work in Costa Rica in the late 1990s.

Differences in theology and governance produced a separation between the churches founded by the missionaries. Thus, the churches of Tepeyac and Los Cuadros were the only ones that remained connected to each other. Together, they established the "Presbyterian and Reformed Church of Costa Rica".

In 1993, the Tepeyac church established the "Centro Educacional Cristão Reformado" (CECRE), a school education institution. Aletha Green was the director of CECRE for 13 years, during which time the institution was able to build an elementary and high school.

The Tepeyac church later planted two daughter churches, one in El Carmen de Guadalupe (Pacto de Gracia) and another in Cartago (First Reformed Presbyterian Church of Cartago).

Another mission was established in Pérez Zeledon, so that the denomination formed a presbytery of four congregations and one mission.

== Doctrine ==
The denomination subscribes to the Apostles' Creed, the Westminster Confession of Faith, Westminster Larger Catechism, Westminster Shorter Catechism, Canons of Dort, Heidelberg Catechism, and Belgic Confession

== Inter-church relations ==
Together with the Reformed Baptist Church of Los Lagos (Heredia), IPREC formed an association of Reformed pastors and leaders. This association promotes the unified worship of "Reformation Day" as well as the annual Reformed Conference "Grace and Truth."
