= Lewis B. Smedes =

American theologian and academic (1921–2002)

Lewis Benedictus Smedes (August 20, 1921 – December 19, 2002) was a renowned Christian author, ethicist, and theologian in the Reformed tradition. He was a professor of theology and ethics for twenty-five years at Fuller Theological Seminary in Pasadena, California. His 15 books, including the popular Forgive and Forget: Healing the Hurts We Don't Deserve, covered some important issues including sexuality and forgiveness.

== Early life and education ==
Lewis Benedictus Smedes was born in 1921, the youngest of five children. His father, Melle Smedes, and mother, Rena, emigrated to the United States from Oostermeer, Friesland in the Netherlands (Rena's original name was Renske.) When he was two months old, his father died in the partially completed house he built in Muskegon, Michigan.

Smedes graduated from Calvin College (B.A.), Calvin Theological Seminary (B.D.), and the Free University of Amsterdam (Th.D). He pursued other graduate studies at Oxford University in United Kingdom and the University of Basel in Switzerland.

== Ministry and career ==
Smedes began his teaching career at Fuller Theological Seminary as a visiting professor in 1968. He joined the faculty as full professor in 1970. He retired in 1995.

After his time at Fuller, Smedes performed several years of pastoral service in the Christian Reformed Church at Madison Avenue Christian Reformed Church (Paterson, NJ), where he was ordained.

Smedes also taught at the Free University in Amsterdam (1968 to 1969) and Calvin College (1957 to 1968) in Grand Rapids, Michigan.

== Personal life and death ==
Smedes married Doris Dekker in 1948, and together they had three children. He died in Arcadia, California on December 19, 2002 after falling from a ladder at his home.

== Legacy ==
Collections of Smedes papers are housed at Calvin University and Fuller Theological Seminary.

== Major works ==
In addition to many articles, Smedes wrote many popular books including:

- Forgive & Forget: Healing the Hurts We Don't Deserve, Harper, 1984
- A Pretty Good Person: What it Takes to Live with Courage, Gratitude, & Integrity or When Pretty Good Is as Good as You Can Be, Harper, 1990
- Standing on the Promises, Thomas Nelson, 1998
- Choices: Making Right Decisions in a Complex World, Harper & Row, 1986
- How Can It Be All Right When Everything Is All Wrong?, Simon & Schuster, 1982
- Caring & Commitment: Learning to Live the Love We Promise, Harper & Row, 1988
- The Incarnation in Modern Anglo-Catholic Theology
- All Things Made New: A Theology of Man's Union with Christ, Eerdmans, 1970
- Love Within Limits
- Sex for Christians
- Mere Morality: How Do We Make Decisions on the Things that Matter Most, Eerdmans, 1993
- A Life of Distinction: What It Takes to Live with Courage, Honesty, and Gratitude, Shaw Books, 2002
- The Art of Forgiving
- Shame and Grace: Healing the Shame We Don't Deserve, HarperSanFrancisco, 1993
- Keeping Hope Alive: For a Tomorrow We Cannot Control, Thomas Nelson, 1998
- My God and I, a Spiritual Memoir, Eerdmans, 2003
