= Briarwood Presbyterian Church =

- Briarwood Presbyterian Church
- 33.416742°N 86.760106°W
- Location: 2200 Briarwood Way Birmingham, Alabama 35243
- Country: United States
- Denomination: Presbyterian Church in America
- Previous denomination: Presbyterian Church in the United States
- Website: briarwood.org

History
- Founded: September 25, 1960
- Founder(s): Frank M. Barker, Jr.

Briarwood Presbyterian Church is a congregation of the Presbyterian Church in America located in suburban Birmingham, Alabama.

== History ==
It was formed in 1960 by the Rev. Frank M. Barker, Jr. and has been a conservative evangelical Protestant congregation since its inception. Begun as a Bible study in 1955, it was the very first church to be organized in a then-undeveloped, suburban area of Birmingham. On September 25, 1960, the church was officially organized, and in 1972 the Briarwood Theological Seminary was chartered. A later sanctuary was completed in 1974; the fellowship hall was built in 1980. Central Presbyterian Church in Birmingham closed after 99 years of service in 1993. Many of its members joined Briarwood Presbyterian and helped to grow Briarwood into an even larger congregation. In 1988 the church moved to its current campus on Acton Road. Its original campus became the home of Southeastern Bible College and then Mountain Brook Community Church. In 1999, Barker retired after serving as the senior pastor for 40 years, and was succeeded by the Rev. Dr. Harry L. Reeder III. Reeder served until he died in a traffic accident on May 18, 2023. Founded in a storefront, it later grew to have what was reported to be the largest church budget in Alabama, and opened a $32 million campus in 1988. In 2011 the expansion of youth project was begun. In 2013 the Children's Auditorium was completed, to allow more space to the growing children's ministries. Originally a member congregation of the Presbyterian Church in the United States (a predecessor to the present Presbyterian Church (USA)), Briarwood was among some 250 PCUS congregations that became charter members of the Presbyterian Church in America (PCA) in December 1973; the organizational meeting was conducted in Briarwood's sanctuary. The first General Assembly of the PCA was held in Briarwood’s church building on December 4, 1973. The Birmingham area is a strong pocket of influence for the PCA, with some 15 other PCA congregations located in Jefferson and Shelby counties in addition to Briarwood.

== Recent status ==
Briarwood has a membership of approximately 4,000 and has been responsible for helping form ministries such as Campus Outreach, Christian Medical Ministry, Birmingham Theological Seminary, and Young Business Leaders, as well as planting numerous churches around the world. In 2006, The worship of the church is characterized by a greater formality than in many other evangelical congregations in its area. it was listed as being the 35th-most-influential non-Roman Catholic church in America by "The Church Report". The church organized Briarwood Christian School in 1965. The school now has an enrollment of over 1,800 on two campuses and is recognized as being one of the foremost Christian schools in the world. The Worship Center and church campus is located at I-459 and Acton Road. In order to provide protection for over 1,000 students on two campuses at Briarwood Christian School, the church has requested the state government to allow it to set up its own police department, modeled after existing police departments within Alabama colleges and universities. This permission was granted by a law signed by Governor Kay Ivey in June 2019.

== Beliefs ==
Briarwood adheres to the historic Presbyterian confessions:

- Westminster Confession of Faith
- Westminster Larger Catechism
- Westminster Shorter Catechism

== Partners ==
Briarwood is a founding congregation of the Presbyterian Church in America.

The Christian Reformed Church in South Africa has national contact with the Briarwood Church.
