= Christian Reformed Church in El Salvador =

The Christian Reformed Church in El Salvador created the missionaries of the Christian Reformed Church in North America in 1978. El Salvador suffered unrest, and this time the denomination suffered a split, the Christian and Reformed Church in El Salvador was formed. It diminished to a small size, but it's very active. The Reformed Church has 2 congregations and 600 members, and adheres to the Apostles Creed, Belgic Confession, Heidelberg Catechism and the Canons of Dort. One of these churches is the Christian Reformed Church in Santa Recla, it is in a short distance from the capital city of El Salvador. After the civil war just this and another church survived.
