= Christian Reformed Church in Honduras =

The Christian Reformed Church in Honduras was formed by 26 members from the Evangelical and Reformed Church in Honduras who moved from San Pedro Sula to the capital city of Tegucigalpa. They wanted to start another Evangelical and reformed church, they asked help to the Christian Reformed Church in North America. In 1972 missionaries were sent by the CRCNA. This work developed and in the central are eight churches were started, in the south with 9 churches and in Olancho with 22 congregations. In 1990 a Synod was formed. A theological seminary was formed. The church affirms the Apostles Creed, the Athanasian Creed, the Nicene Creed, the Canons of Dort and the Heidelberg Catechism. The denomination has 1,500 - 2,000 members with 18 parishes and almost 40 house fellowships.

Member of the World Communion of Reformed Churches.
