= Christian Reformed Church in Nicaragua =

The Christian Reformed Church in Nicaragua or the Iglesia Cristiana Reformada de Nicaragua was founded by the missionaries of the Christian Reformed Church in North America after the 1972 earthquake in Nicaragua. Two Mexican evangelists from Mexico City came to assist the mission. In 2004 there was 8 congregations are in Managua, Tipitapa, Muy Muy, Chinandega, Nagarote and El Tamarinho with hundreds of members. It affirms the Apostles Creed, Canons of Dort, Heidelberg Catechism and the Westminster Confession.
