= Christian Sebastia =

Venezuelan musician

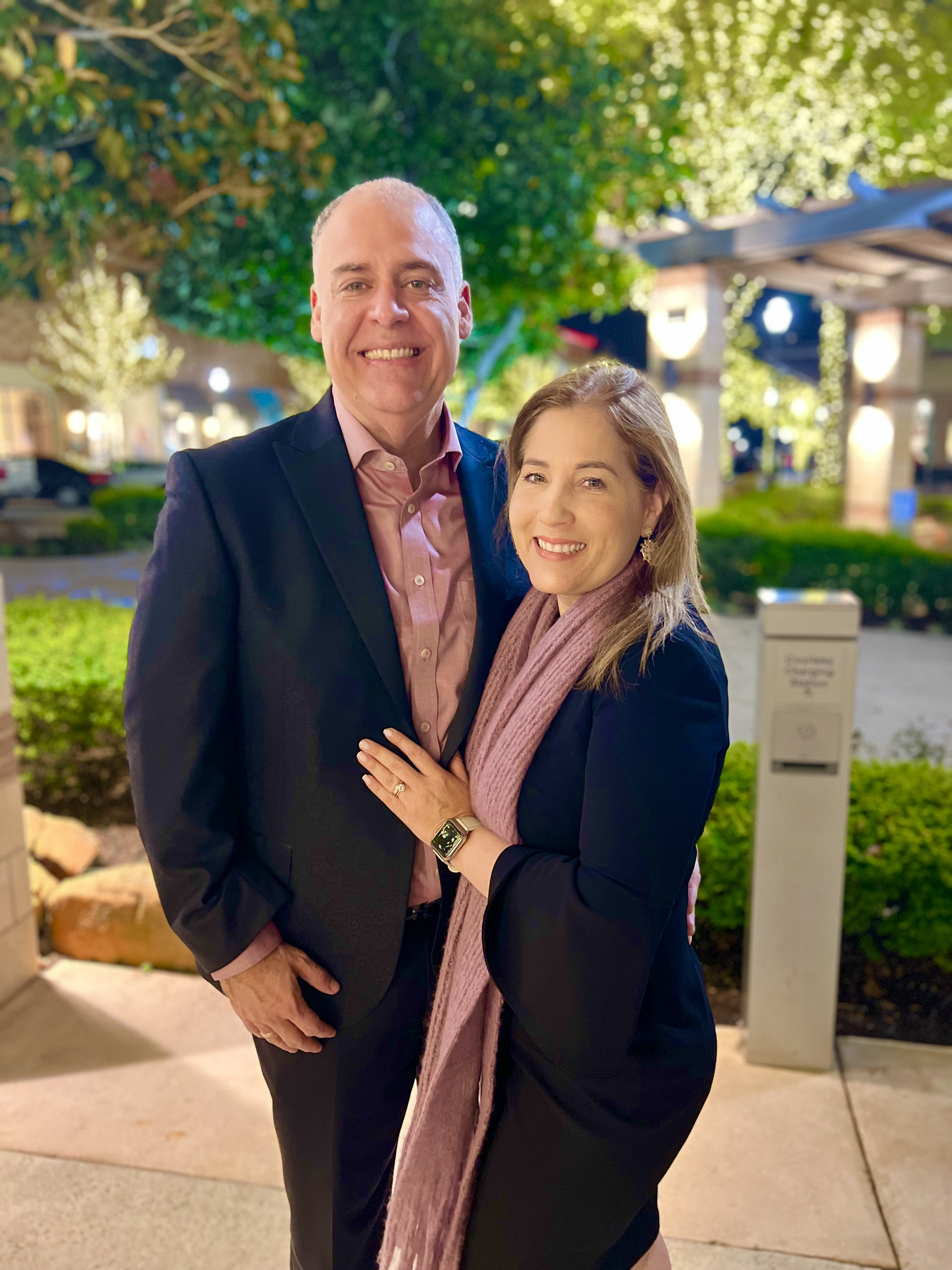
- Christian Sebastia with his wife Eukarys in 2021

Background information
- Born: Christian Sebastia Almenar; May 7, 1974 (age 52)
- Origin: Ciudad Guayana, Venezuela
- Genres: Praise & Worship, Gospel, Contemporary Christian
- Occupations: musician and pastor
- Instruments: Voice, Piano, Cuatro venezolano, Drum, Bass, Guitar
- Years active: 1986 – present
- Labels: Carismah Studios (2001 – present)
- Website: christiansebastia.com

Christian Sebastia Almenar, better known as Christian Sebastia, is a Venezuelan musician and pastor.

== Early and personal life ==
Christian Sebastia was born in Ciudad Guayana, Venezuela to parents who served as pastors.

In 1996, he married Eukarys Piña.

From 2006 to 2015, served as a pastor in the Church of Jesus Christ along with his wife.

On November 15, 2020, Sebastia and his wife were ordained as Ministers of the Word by the Christian Reformed Church in North America in Spring, Texas.

== Career ==
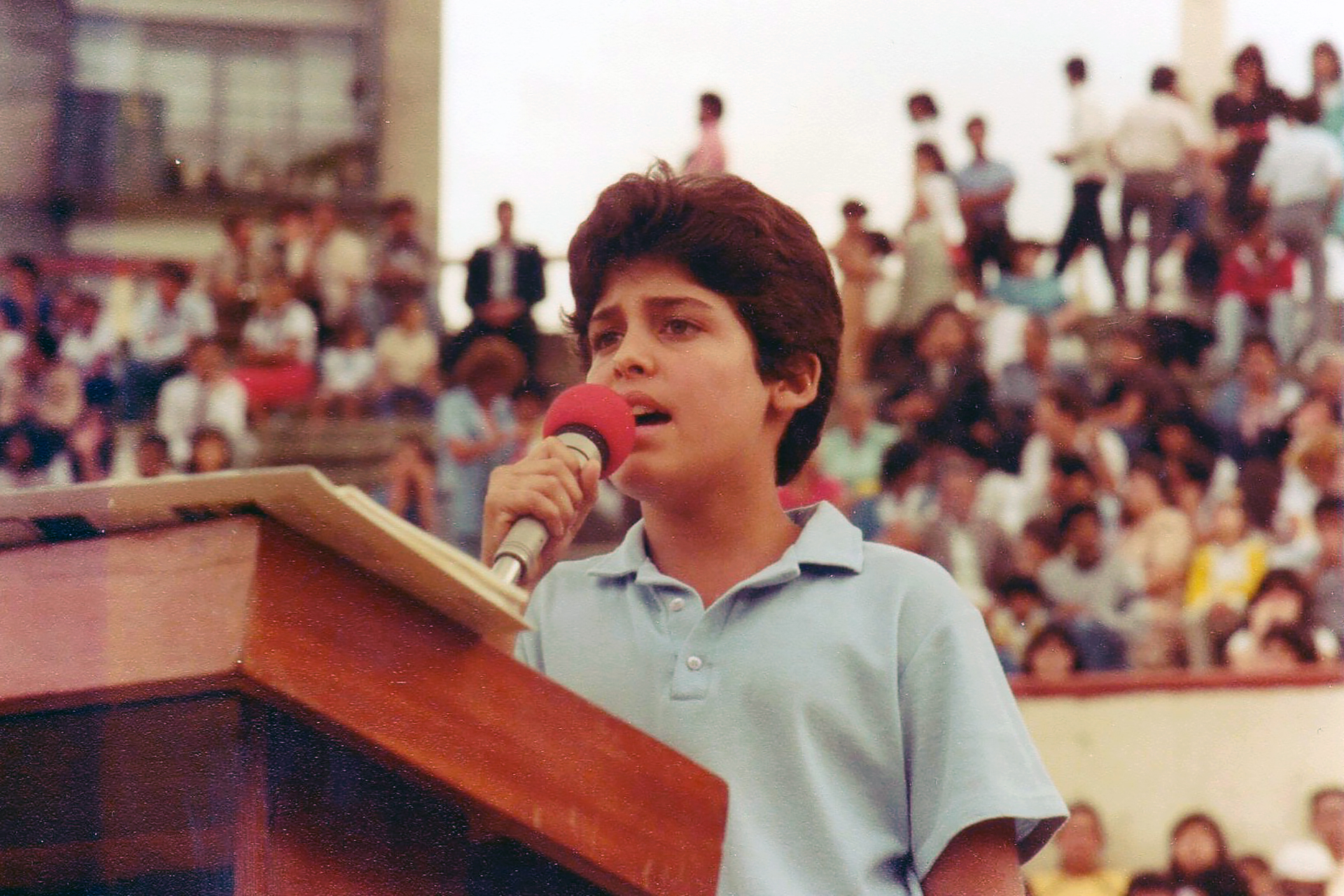
Christian Sebastia in the "Nuevo Circo" of Caracas, Venezuela in 1986

Sebastia's first record was La Familia a production of 10 songs made in 1986 and produced by his father, interpreting 2 songs.

In 2004 he was the first Venezuelan singer to participate in the Noche de Gala of Expolit and the theme Me Alegraré y Gozaré of the album "En Ti" was included in the track 12 of the compilation musical performed by Expolit titled Llamados para este tiempo where he shared space with the most renowned Christian artists of the time. Christian has been uninterrupted exhibitor at Expolit for 14 years, the largest Latin-American exhibition of Christian music and literature in the Hispano-America.

In March of the year 2004, Christian presented for 6 consecutive nights in the Monumental of Valencia, Venezuela, with an attendance of 25 thousand people who sang next to Christian his best known songs.

Among some of the songs from the album includes, En Ti and Me Alegraré y Gozaré, he played at Madison Square Garden in New York on July 27 to 29 of the year 2006.

In 2006, the "Tu Amor / Your Love" album was recorded live in the campus of the Church of Jesus Christ in Ciudad Guayana, Venezuela, this production had guests who participate in duets with Christian Sebastia, among which is Tu Amor and 'Palabra del Señor with Pastor and artist Marcos Witt, Tu eres mi abrigo with Pastor Juan Sebastia, his father, Para darte la Gloria that is interpreted together with Jennifer Salinas.

In 2008 the music album Tu Amor received the distinction of Mara de Oro as "Best Christian Production of the Year 2008".

Later in 2011, he won this distinction in the category of "Best Production Manager Tour 25 Commemorative – Marcos Witt year 2011", for the production of the series of concerts that Witt gave in Venezuela (Puerto Ordaz, Barinas, Maracaibo and Caracas)

In 2013 Sebastia became the Production Manager of Monica Rodriguez, singer and first Venezuelan woman to win the Latin Grammy Awards. In 2014 Christian was awarded "Best Production Manager Tour Monica Rodriguez - Ecuador, Venezuela, Mexico and the United States of the year 2014" by the organization of Mara de Oro.

In May of the year 2018 the album "Tengo Fe" was released. This Christian musical production has the participation of guest stars, who performed together with Sebastia songs like: "Tu Amor" with Ilan Chester, "Nunca Pude Imaginar" with Mariaca Semprún, "Jesús La Razón" with Luis Fernando Borjas vocalist of Guaco (band), "A ti Me Rindo" with Gabriela Cartulano, nominated for the best Christian album in the edition of the Latin Grammys of the year 2017, "Principe de Paz" with Clayton Uehara among others. Produced by the record label Carismah Studios and CA Entertainment Group.

On Friday, April 5, 2019, the album "Tengo Fe" was nominated for the XV edition of the awards of the National Academy of Music and Christian Arts (Arpa Awards) in three categories: "Best Pop / Fusion Album", "Best Song in Participation (Principe de Paz - feat Clayton Uehara)" and "Best producer."

== Discography ==
- La Familia
- En Ti
- Llamados para este tiempo
- Tu Amor
- 2013 eXplosion
- Tengo Fe

== Awards and nominations ==
- Mara de Oro Award "Tu Amor as Best Christian Production of the Year 2008"
- Mara de Oro Award "Best Production Manager Tour 25 Commemorative – Marcos Witt year 2011"
- Mara de Oro Award "Best Production Manager Tour Monica Rodriguez - Ecuador, Venezuela, Mexico and the United States of the year 2014"
- Nominated for the XV edition of the ARPA awards for "Best Album Pop / Fusion 2019"
- Nominated for the XV edition of the ARPA awards for the "Best Song in Participation 2019 (Principe de Paz - f.e.a.t. Clayton Uehara)"
- Winner of the XV edition of the ARPA awards for "Producer of the Year 2019" (Tengo Fe)
