= College of Liberal Arts =

College of Liberal Arts may refer to, among other things, any of the following:

- De La Salle University College of Liberal Arts
- Georgia Institute of Technology Ivan Allen College of Liberal Arts
- Kobe College of Liberal Arts
- Korea University College of Liberal Arts
- Massachusetts College of Liberal Arts
- University of Minnesota College of Liberal Arts
- College of Liberal Arts at the University of Nevada
- Oregon State University College of Liberal Arts
- Purdue University College of Liberal Arts
- RIT College of Liberal Arts
- Texas A&M College of Liberal Arts
- Thomas More College of Liberal Arts
- Towson University College of Liberal Arts
- Shanghai University College of Liberal Arts
- Wright State University College of Liberal Arts

== See also ==
- College of Arts and Sciences
- Liberal arts college
