= Christian Reformed Church in Cuba =

The Christian Reformed Church in Cuba is a Reformed and Presbyterian Church in Cuba. It was founded by Jesse Vander Valk of Paterson, New Jersey, decided to work in Cuba. She worked with the Cuban Evangelical association. Mission stations were in Matanzas Province. She spent 22 years in Cuba and married a Cuban pastor Rev. Vicente Izquierdo. In 1944 the Cuban Evangelical Association was dissolved. The couple decided to continue this work with the support of Christian Reformed Church in North America and formed the Interior Gospel Mission. This Internal Gospel Mission was officially adopted by the CRCNA in 1958. A Missionary was sent in 1959. The new church continue to grow, by 1974 the Iglesia Cristiana Reformada had 12 congregations and 8 pastors. The In 2004 it had 12 congregations 24 house fellowships and 12,000 members.
