= Christian Reformed Church in Eastern Africa =

The Christian Reformed Church in Eastern Africa started in 1992, when several pastors left the Reformed Church of East Africa who wanted to focus on fields beyond Kenya.

There are congregations in Uganda, Tanzania, and Kenya. It is registered in Uganda and Kenya. There is woman ordination. The church was a member of the Reformed Ecumenical Council, and later the World Communion of Reformed Churches.

From 2007 there were congregations in Democratic Republic of Congo. It is present in South Kivu Province, in Bukavu and Minembwe-Kabingo. The church has three districts. Kabingo district has six congregations, Kaligi district has four and the Kinyoni has three congregations. It has a relationship with the Christian Reformed Church in North America.

The denomination subscribes to the Apostles Creed, the Athanasian Creed and the Nicene Creed as well as the Reformed confessions.
