= Crc (protein) =

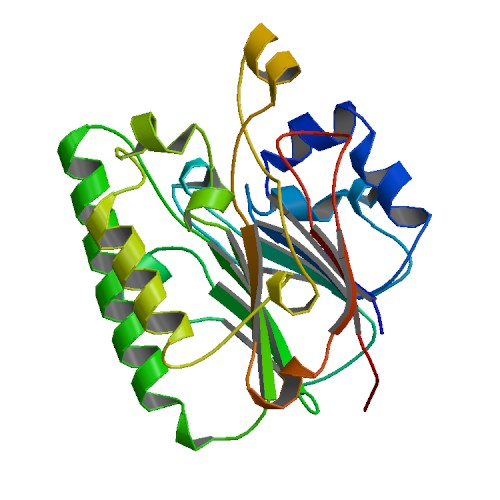
- Crystal structure of Crc in Pseudomonas aeruginosa.

Identifiers
- Symbol: Crc
- Pfam: PF03372
- CDD: cd08372
Available protein structures:
- PDB: PF03372 (ECOD; PDBsum)
- AlphaFold: PF03372

The Catabolite repression control (Crc) protein participates in suppressing expression of several genes involved in utilization of carbon sources in Pseudomonas bacteria. Presence of organic acids triggers activation of Crc and in conjunction with the Hfq protein genes that metabolize a given carbon source are downregulated until another more favorable carbon source is depleted. Crc-mediated regulation impact processes such as biofilm formation, virulence and antibiotic susceptibility.

== Interactions ==
A consensus sequence targeted by Crc mediated regulation

Hfq and Crc bind to A-rich sequences in the ribosome binding sites of genes that code for carbon utilization enzymes and consequently suppress their translation.

== See also ==
- CrcZ - Responsible for sequestering the protein Crc
