= Christian Labor Association =

American trade union

- Founded: April 27, 1931
- Location: United States
- Affiliations: Independent
- Website: cla-usa.com

The Christian Labor Association (CLA) is a trade union based in Grand Rapids, Michigan, United States. It was founded on April 27, 1931, by members of the Christian Reformed Church of North America, a Protestant denomination associated with Calvinism. It focuses on having a "balanced and inclusive approach to labor relations has provided dignity and respect for both employees and employers."

In 1938, the CLA described itself as "actively engaged in fighting all radicalism in industrial life and in labor organizations."

As of 2020, the CLA is open to all who choose to affiliate with it, regardless of creed. It has locals in California, Michigan, and Minnesota.
