= CliftonLarsonAllen =

American accounting firm

CliftonLarsonAllen LLP
- Company type: Limited liability partnership (LLP)
- Industry: Accounting firm
- Founded: 2012; merger of Clifton Gunderson (1960) and LarsonAllen (1953)
- Key people: Jen Leary, CEO
- Services: Audit; Accounting; Tax; Consulting; Advisory
- Revenue: ▲US$2 billion (2024)
- Number of employees: 8,120 (2024)
- Website: www.claconnect.com LinkedIn: https://www.linkedin.com/company/cliftonlarsonallen/life/49f013c7-ff87-4084-b1b3-696cc9ad450f/

CliftonLarsonAllen LLP (known as CliftonLarsonAllen or CLA) is a professional services firm and the eighth-largest accountancy firm in the United States. It was established in 2012 with the merger of Clifton Gunderson LLP (based in Milwaukee, Wisconsin) and LarsonAllen LLP (based in Minneapolis, Minnesota). It is an independent member of CLA Global accounting network.

== History ==
Clifton Gunderson LLP was the 14th-largest accounting firm in the U.S. in 2010, and the largest member firm of HLB International until it left that network in 2012 after the merger with LarsonAllen. The merger occurred January 2, 2012.

In June 2022, CLA formed CLA Global Limited in collaboration with Evelyn Partners, a U.K.-based wealth management group. CLA Global has more than 10,000 clients in more than 100 countries. CLA Global is one of the top 15 global accounting and advisory organizations in the world, based on fee income.

CLA Wealth Advisors ranked 45th in Barron’s top 100 RIA firms for 2024 and is ranked number six in assets under management by Accounting Today.

Kris McMasters and Gordy Viere became the first co-CEOs of CLA, with Viere also the CEO of CLA Holdings. McMasters retired April 1, 2013, leaving Viere as sole CEO. Denny Schleper became the CEO of CLA in January 2015 after Viere retired. Upon Schleper's retirement, Jen Leary was named CEO in January 2021.
