= Steven R. Timmermans =

Steven R. Timmermans (born 26 September 1957 in Grand Rapids, Michigan) was the executive director of the Christian Reformed Church in North America (CRCNA) from 2014 to 2020.

He received a B.S. from Calvin College in 1979 and postgraduate degrees from the University of Michigan (M.S. in Psychology; Ph.D. in Education and Psychology) and is a licensed psychologist in Michigan.

Timmermans authored Fully for Life (2024) and Followership: Faithful Following in an Age of Confusion (2022), both published by Wipf and Stock. He has also written chapters in several books, including University-Community Partnerships (edited by T. Soska and A. Johnson Butterfield) and The One in the Many (edited by Thomas Thompson), and articles for journals and other publications. He was a pediatric psychologist at Mary Free Bed Hospital from 1985 to 1989 and a professor and administrator at Calvin College from 1989 to 2003. He became president of Trinity Christian College in Palos Heights, Illinois in 2003, where he remained until beginning his service as executive director of the CRCNA in 2013. He has been involved in community projects in the Chicago and Grand Rapids areas, including interfaith efforts, and has held leadership positions on various boards. He has also led grant projects from the Ford Foundation, the U.S. Department of Housing and Urban Development, and the W. K. Kellogg Foundation.

In his retirement he volunteers with refugee families and serves as a psychologist at an ADHD clinic. His wife, Barbara Bosscher Timmermans, is a nursing professor emerita at Calvin University, previously at Trinity Christian College. They have seven children, some of whom are adopted from Ethiopia, and nine grandchildren.
