= Christian Reformed Church in South Africa =

Christian denomination in South Africa

- Classification: Protestant
- Theology: Calvinist
- Polity: Presbyterian
- Leader: Rev IB Weber
- Founder: Dirk de Vos
- Origin: April 28, 1944; Durban, South Africa
- Separated from: Dutch Reformed Church in South Africa
- Separations: Evangelical Reformed Church in South Africa
- Congregations: 21
- Members: Unknown

The Christian Reformed Church in South Africa is a Christian denomination in South Africa. The moderator is Rev. R du Toit, the Vice Moderator is Rev. Johnnie Tromp.

== Doctrine ==
- Three Forms of Unity
  - Belgic Confession
  - Heidelberg Catechism
  - Canons of Dort

== Education ==
- Christian Reformed Theological Seminary www.cgts.co.za

== Demographics ==
The denomination is present in 6 South African Provinces, these are:

- Eastern Cape Province (3 churches)
- Free State (1 church)
- Gauteng (8 church)
- Kwazulu Natal (4 church)
- Mpumalanga (1 church)
- Western Cape (5 church)

Approximately 22 churches belong to the Christian Reformed Church in South Africa

== Interchurch organisations ==
- Ministry partner of the church is Briarwood Presbyterian Church in Birmingham, AL
