= Shanghai University College of Liberal Arts =

The College of Liberal Arts (Chinese: 上海大学文学院) of Shanghai University is a branch which concentrates mainly on linguistics and liberal arts, history and sociology theory. There are 141 full-time teachers in the institute, and 1,244 students.
