= Children's Learning Adventure =

American daycare center chain

- Industry: Child care
- Founded: 2008; 17 years ago
- Headquarters: Scottsdale, Arizona, United States
- Area served: United States
- Website: www.childrenslearningadventure.com

Children's Learning Adventure (CLA) is a chain of large daycare centers based in Scottsdale, Arizona, United States. Each campus occupies tens of thousands of square feet, featuring indoor and outdoor sports facilities, dance studios, and other amenities typically found at family entertainment centers. Pre-kindergarten and after-school programs are structured around a STEAM curriculum. The company was founded in 2008 and declared Chapter 11 bankruptcy in 2018. As of 2017, the company operated around 40 campuses in 11 states.
