= Christian Reformed Church of the Dominican Republic =

The Christian Reformed Church in the Dominican Republic (Spanish: Iglesia Cristiana Reformada en la Republica Dominicana) is a Reformed denomination founded by American missionaries.

== History ==
The Christian Reformed Church in North America began mission efforts in the Dominican Republic in the 1970s. In the 1980s the Christian Reformed Church in the Dominican Republic was founded. The church grew rapidly from 11 churches to more than 150 in 1990 mostly among small towns and Haitian community in rural plantations. By 1990, 20 school were begun. In 2004 it had more than 88 congregations and 133 house fellowships with 10,000 members and the denomination adheres to the Apostles Creed, Heidelberg Catechism and the Canons of Dort. Today Christian Reformed Schools educate over 4,500 students.

In 2012 the Dominican Christian Reformed Church had 186 congregations, 125 ordained ministers and 12,000 members.

== Association ==
It is a member of the World Communion of Reformed Churches.
