= Christian Reformed Church in North America =

Protestant Christian denomination

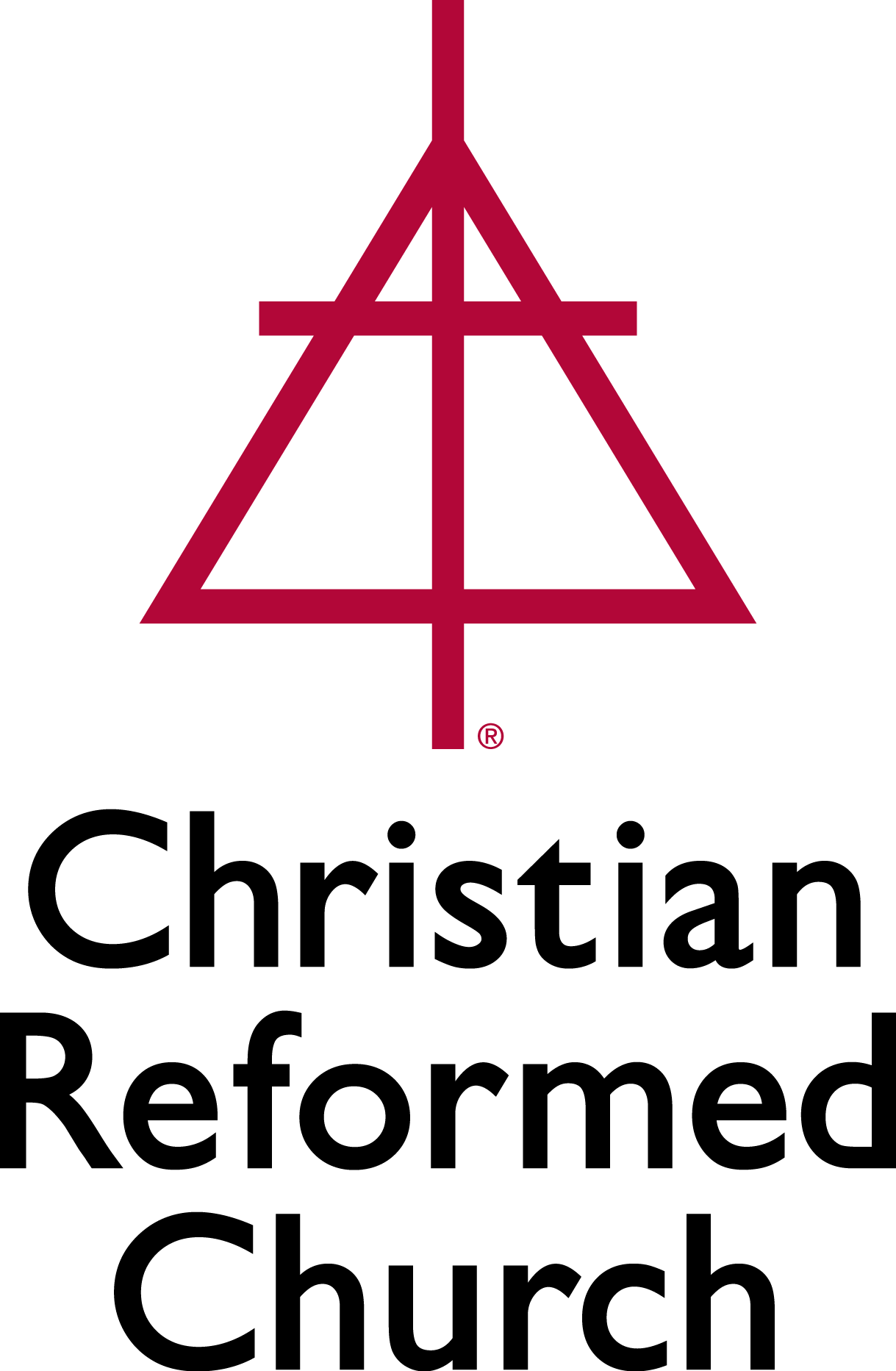
- Official Logo of the Christian Reformed Church
- Abbreviation: CRCNA or CRC
- Classification: Protestant
- Orientation: Evangelical, Continental Dutch Reformed
- Theology: Reformed
- Polity: Modified-Presbyterian
- Fellowships: Churches in Communion; EPC (since 1986); ECO (since 2014); RCA (since 2014); Churches in Cooperation; PCC (since 2010); ARC (since 2024)
- Associations: World Reformed Fellowship
- Region: United States, Canada
- Headquarters: Grand Rapids, Michigan, and Burlington, Ontario
- Origin: 1857; Holland, Michigan
- Separated from: Founded by Dutch immigrants; split from the Reformed Church in America
- Branched from: Dutch Reformed Church
- Separations: 1924–26 Protestant Reformed Churches; 1988 Orthodox Christian Reformed Churches; 1996 United Reformed Churches in North America
- Congregations: 1,000 (2024)
- Members: 189,753 (2024)
- Official website: www.crcna.org

The Christian Reformed Church in North America (CRCNA or CRC) is a Protestant Calvinist Christian denomination in the United States and Canada. Having roots in the Dutch Reformed Church of the Netherlands, the Christian Reformed Church was founded by Dutch immigrants in 1857 and is theologically Calvinist.

== History ==
The Christian Reformed Church (CRC) split from the Reformed Church in America (then known as the Dutch Reformed Church) in an 1857 secession. This was rooted in part as a result of a theological dispute that originated in the Netherlands in which Hendrik De Cock was deposed for his Calvinist convictions, leading there to the Secession of 1834–35. For the CRC founders in America, the RCA then appeared to contain problems similar to those that they had seen in the State Church in the old country. Gijsbert Haan was the leader in the 1857 Secession of Dutch-Americans from the Reformed Church in America and the creator of the Christian Reformed Church in the United States and Canada.

In 1857, four churches with about 130 families (about 10 percent of the Dutch immigrant church members in West Michigan at the time) seceded. In March, the Noordeloos church of the Classis of Holland, Michigan, left the Reformed Church in America. On March 19, some members of Second Reformed Church, Grand Rapids, Michigan, organized a church that became First CRC, Grand Rapids, Michigan. On April 8, churches in Graafschap and Polkton also left the Classis of Holland. Two ministers, Koene van den Bosch and Hendrik Klijn, joined the separatists, although Klijn returned to the Reformed Church six months later.

The new denomination that formed from this secession was led by elders and ministers from the churches in the northern Netherlands, especially from the province of Groningen, that had organized after the 1834 secession in the Netherlands, although members of the new denomination came from all parts of the Netherlands. The reasons given for leaving the Reformed Church were the use of hymns (versus Exclusive psalmody) during worship, allowing free access to communion, lax interpretation of grace, permitting membership in Freemasonry, and failure to provide catechetical instruction to young people.

For the two years, the denomination had no corporate name. In 1859, Holland Reformed Church (Hollandsche Gereformeerde Kerk) was adopted, which was changed to Free Dutch Reformed Church (no record of a Dutch translation) in 1861. Two years later, True Dutch Reformed Church (Ware Hollandsche Gereformeerde Kerk) was approved, which was changed to Holland Christian Reformed Church (Hollandsche Christelijke Gereformeerde Kerk) in 1880. In 1894 congregations also could use Christian Reformed Church (Christelijke Gereformeerde Kerk) as well. The full adoption of Christian Reformed Church came in 1904, which became Christian Reformed Church in North America in 1974.

In 1875, the denomination opened a theological school in Grand Rapids, Michigan. The Preparatory Department of the school became Calvin College, while the Theological Department became Calvin Theological Seminary. By 1880 the denomination had grown to 42 congregations. Ten years later the number had grown to 100 located in 11 states. During the 1890s congregations from the True Protestant Dutch Reformed Church (located in New York and New Jersey) joined the CRC. During the 20th century a number of congregations from the disbanding German Reformed Churches also joined the CRC.

By 1920, the denomination had grown to 350 congregations. At that time an estimated 350,000 Dutch immigrants had come to the United States, some of whom were in the Dutch Reformed tradition that since the 1880s was influenced by Abraham Kuyper, a Dutch Neo-Calvinist theologian, journalist, and statesman (he served as Prime Minister of the Netherlands, 1901-1905). He founded the Gereformeerde Kerken, a newspaper, the Free University of Amsterdam, and the Anti-Revolutionary Political Party.

During the early 1920s, the CRC adopted three doctrinal points regarding common grace. Three ministers, Herman Hoeksema, George Ophoff, and Henry Danhof were deposed for rejecting three points as being contrary to the Reformed confessions. The dispute led to the three ministers and their followers leaving the CRC and forming what is now the Protestant Reformed Churches in America.

After the Second World War, a new wave of Dutch Calvinist immigration occurred to Canada, most of which were Kuyperian. By 1960, half of the denomination's new congregations (138 of 288) were in Canada.

In the early 1950s, a division within the Protestant Reformed Churches in America led to about three fifths of its members forming the Orthodox Protestant Reformed Church, which joined the CRC in 1961.

== Ecumenical partnerships ==
In 1975 the CRC joined the Orthodox Presbyterian Church (OPC), Reformed Presbyterian Church of North America (RPCNA), the Reformed Presbyterian Church, Evangelical Synod (RPCES) and the Presbyterian Church in America (PCA) in forming the North American Presbyterian and Reformed Council (NAPARC).

In the last decades of the 20th century, the Synod enacted innovations that were rejected by some of its more conservative members and one-time sister denominations. Out of concern about the state of affairs in the CRC, a group of ministers formed the Mid-America Reformed Seminary in 1981, and around the same time a federation of churches known as the Orthodox Christian Reformed Churches (OCRC), comprising some former CRC congregations, was formed. The 1995 decision to ordain women led to the formation of the United Reformed Churches in North America (URC), and the severing of fraternal relationships between the CRC and the OPC and PCA in 1997. Because of the decision to ordain women, NAPARC suspended the CRC from membership in 1999 and expelled it in 2001. This gradual shift has spurred some of the more conservative congregations to leave; a significant number of these have ended up in the PCA, OPC, or URC. In 2008, the OCRC dissolved and member churches joined the URC.

The CRC was a charter member of the Reformed Ecumenical Council, which organized at Grand Rapids, Michigan in 1946. The CRC joined the World Alliance of Reformed Churches in 2002 after many years of hesitation due to what was seen as the more liberal membership and agenda of that body. In 2010, the Reformed Ecumenical Council and World Alliance of Reformed Churches merged to form the World Communion of Reformed Churches at a joint meeting hosted by the CRC in Grand Rapids, Michigan. The CRC's 2026 synod voted to withdraw from the WCRC. The CRC also belongs to the Canadian Council of Churches, the Evangelical Fellowship of Canada, the World Reformed Fellowship, and the National Association of Evangelicals. The CRC participates in Christian Churches Together in the United States and in the Global Christian Forum.

As of 2025 the CRC has bilateral relationships with 44 denominations around the globe: 24 are "in communion" and 20 are "in cooperation." In North America, the CRC has "in communion" relationships with the more mainline Reformed Church in America (from which it had split in 1857), the Evangelical Presbyterian Church, ECO: A Covenant Order of Evangelical Presbyterians, and the more newly formed Alliance of Reformed Churches.

== Theology ==
The Christian Reformed Church is Calvinist, confessional and evangelical in its theology. It places high value on theological study and the application of theology to current issues, emphasizes the importance of careful Biblical hermeneutics, and has traditionally respected the personal conscience of individual members who feel they are led by the Holy Spirit. The Church promotes the belief that Christians do not earn their salvation, but that it is a wholly unmerited gift from God, and that good works are the Christian response to that gift.

Reformed theology as practiced in the CRC is founded in Calvinism. A more recent theologian of great influence on this denomination was Abraham Kuyper (1837–1920). Kuyper, who served as the Prime Minister of the Netherlands from 1901 to 1905, promoted a belief in social responsibility and called on Christians to engage actively in improving all aspects of life and society. Kuyper is regarded as a founding father of Christian Democracy political ideology. Current scholars with wider reputations, such as philosophers Alvin Plantinga and Nicholas Wolterstorff, as well as Lewis B. Smedes, have associations with this denomination and with Calvin University. Philip Yancey has stated, "I also admire the tradition of the Christian Reformed Church, which advocates 'bringing every thought captive' under the mind of Christ; that tiny 'transforming' denomination has had an enormous influence on science, philosophy, and the arts."

== Doctrinal standards ==
The CRC officially subscribes to the Ecumenical Creeds—the Apostles' Creed, the Nicene Creed, and the Athanasian Creed—as well as three Reformed Confessions, commonly referred as the Three Forms of Unity: the Belgic Confession, the Heidelberg Catechism, and the Canons of Dort.

In 1986, the CRC formulated a statement of faith titled "Our World Belongs to God: A Contemporary Testimony" which addresses issues such as secularism, individualism, and relativism. These issues were seen as "unique challenges of faith presented by the times in which we live". While not having confessional status, it is meant to give a hymn-like expression of CRC beliefs within the heritage of the Reformed confessions, especially addressing issues that confront the church today. The Contemporary Testimony was reviewed and updated in 2008. The second Contemporary Testimony held by the CRCNA is the Belhar Confession, a testimony written in Afrikaans in 1982 from Reformed churches in South Africa.

== Social issues ==
The Christian Reformed Church has stated its position on a number of social issues. Summaries of those positions and references to full reports with exact statements can be found at crcna.org.

The CRC is opposed to abortion except in cases when the "life of the mother is genuinely threatened" by her pregnancy. The church "affirms the unique value of all human life" from the "moment of conception". Believers are called upon to show "compassion" to those experiencing unwanted pregnancies, even while they speak out against the "atrocity" of abortion. In 2010, the Synod adopted a recommendation "to instruct the Office of Social Justice and Hunger Action (OSJ) to boldly advocate for the church's position against abortion, and to help equip churches to promote the sanctity of human life" (Acts of Synod 2010, p. 883)."

This regard for the value of human life applies to the CRC position on euthanasia as well. Already in 2000, synod maintained that the appropriate response to suffering, disability, and/or dying is pastoral, including palliative care rather than acting to cause death. In 2025, a task force dealt with the growing legalization of assisted suicide throughout North America. In adopting this report, synod expressed its condemnation of the legalization and practice of medically assisted suicide as well as efforts to expand its reach. Instead, the church commended positive gospel approaches to the very real issues of suffering, despair, and loneliness which contribute to the conclusion that medically assisted suicide as an appropriate step (Acts of Synod 2025, p. 656-658).

The CRC has a moderate stance on the death penalty: "The CRC has declared that modern states are not obligated by Scripture, creed, or principle to institute and practice capital punishment. It does, however, recognize that Scripture acknowledges the right of modern states to institute and practice capital punishment if it is exercised with utmost restraint."

The stance of the CRC is that homosexuality is "a condition of disordered sexuality that reflects the brokenness of our sinful world". The CRC distinguishes an individual’s orientation, for which a person may bear "only minimal responsibility", from homosexual sex, which it regards as "incompatible with obedience to the will of God as revealed in Scripture." In 2023, the synod of the CRC acknowledged the shortcomings of itself and its congregations with regard to their pastoral posture toward LGBTQ+ people. Synod 2023 stated, “We acknowledge the immediacy of the call and mutual accountability of all members of the Christian Reformed Church in North America to follow through with the pastoral care outlined in the Human Sexuality Report for the sake of our witness to Jesus Christ. We do so in a spirit of lament for failing in our pastoral care to those who identify as belonging to the LGBTQ+ community” (Acts of Synod 2023, p. 1010). Synod 2023 further instructed “all congregations of the CRCNA to show love to all people groups, including our LGBTQ+ members and neighbors, by condemning hateful or demeaning speech and violent or demeaning actions” (p. 1023). The CRC further maintains that "[p]ersons of same-sex attraction may not be denied acceptance solely on the basis of their sexual orientation", and that "[o]pportunities to serve within the offices and the life of the congregation should be afforded to same-sex oriented Christians as well as to heterosexual Christians."

== Political involvement ==
The CRC educates its constituency and mobilizes member advocacy on a wide range of social justice issues in Canada and the United States. It does so primarily through its Do Justice platform, which includes content from the Centre for Public Dialogue (CPD), World Renew, Diaconal Ministries Canada, and other ministries.

== Missions ==
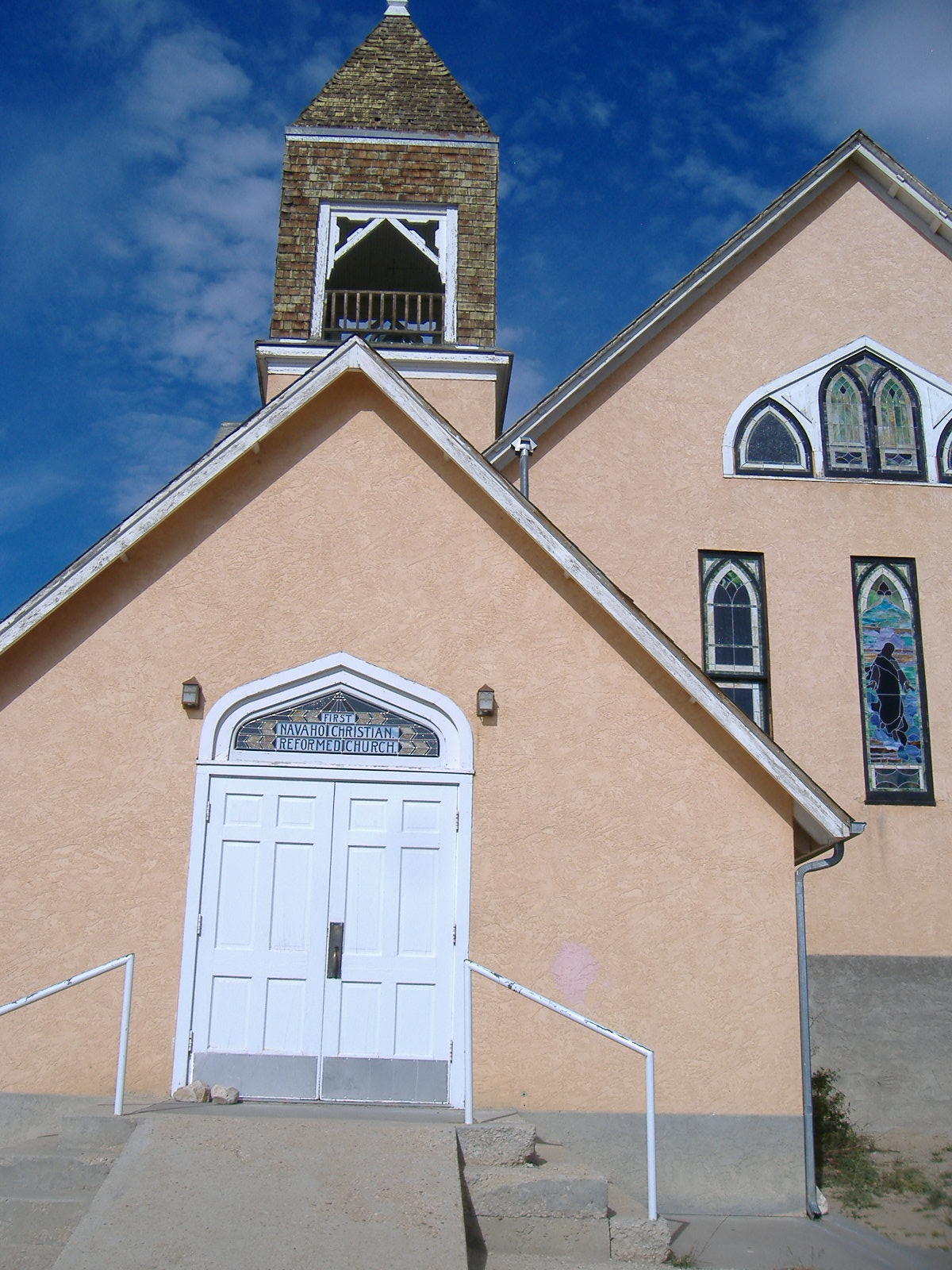
A CRC church on the Navajo reservation

The CRC has mission efforts and ministries in 44 countries. It was also involved in mission work on the Navajo reservation, which has led to Christian Reformed congregations there today. Among the most prominent reservation churches are the Zuni and Rehoboth missions. Rehoboth was founded in 1903 and has grown significantly into a large church and has an independent school with over 500 students in grades K-12; Zuni has experienced the same in its community. The Rehoboth hospital moved to the neighboring town of Gallup in 1970. Rehoboth built a high-school in 1951, and a new high school, funded by the DeVos family, was built in 2018. The first Rehoboth church was built in 1908, though the congregation moved to a new building in 2005.

== Governance ==
The Christian Reformed Church emblem approved for U.S. military gravestones.

Church polity refers to the form of governance and organization of a church. The CRC follows a Presbyterian form of church polity organized under governance by elders, as compared to Episcopal polities organized under governance by bishops (Roman Catholic, United Methodist, and Episcopal denominations) and Congregational polities organized under the governance of the local congregation (Congregational, Baptist, Disciples of Christ). Governance by elders is assumed throughout the Christian Reformed Church Order, but CRC polity is not exactly like that of Presbyterian denominations. Two particular differences include the fact that the CRC has limited tenure for officebearers (so elders and deacons serve terms, not indefinitely), and ministers are ordained and credentialed by a local congregation, not the regional classis or presbytery. Another key difference is that church polity in the CRC does not have confessional status and, therefore, the Church Order does not have the same authority as the creeds. The Church Order is subordinate to the creeds and confessions, which are subordinate to Scripture.

The Christian Reformed Church has three levels of assembly: the church council (local assembly, composed of a congregation's deacons, elders, and ordaine pastors), the classis (regional assembly, of which there are 49: 37 in the United States and 11 in Canada, with one straddling the international border), and the synod (bi-national assembly.) The church's Synod meets annually in June, with 192 delegates: a minister, an elder and a deacon from each classis, plus one other officebearer.

Central offices of the church are located in Grand Rapids, Michigan, and Burlington, Ontario. The CRC in North America has sent missionaries to many countries around the world where Christian Reformed churches have been established, but these have organized on their own and are independent from the North American denomination.

== Ministries and educational institutions ==
The Christian Reformed Church has a long history of pooling the resources of its members in order to start shared ministries and institutions. The denomination supports five agencies, two educational institutions, and three uniquely Canadian justice ministries.

=== Agencies ===
- ReFrame Ministries – (formerly The Back to God Hour) media ministry founded in 1939 that uses radio, television, internet, and text messaging to reach nearly 200 countries, with 34 websites in 10 languages
- Resonate Global Mission - Formed by the joining of Christian Reformed Home Missions and Christian Reformed World Missions, Resonate Global Mission, trains leaders, guides new churches, and forges partnerships to proclaim and live out the good news of Jesus Christ worldwide.
- Thrive - Thrive is the congregational support agency of the CRCNA. Created in 2023, Thrive is a merger of what had previously been nine separate departments (Safe Church, Chaplaincy and Care, Race Relations, Diversity, Social Justice, Faith Formation, Worship, Disability Concerns, and Pastor Church Resources).
- World Renew – World Renew, formerly the Christian Reformed World Relief Committee (CRWRC), is the relief and development organization of the Christian Reformed Church. It responds to the needs of people around the world who are suffering from poverty, hunger, disaster, and injustice.

=== Educational institutions ===
Reformed teaching puts an emphasis on education. As such, many CRC members support Christian day schools as well as post-secondary education.

The denomination owns and supports two main educational institutions: Calvin University as well as Calvin Theological Seminary in Grand Rapids, Michigan, where the denomination's U.S. offices are located. Historically most ministers ordained in the CRC were trained at Calvin Seminary.

While not officially part of the CRCNA, other colleges that were started through support of denomination members include Kuyper College (also located in Grand Rapids), Trinity Christian College in Palos Heights, Illinois; Dordt University in Sioux Center, Iowa; Redeemer University College in Ancaster, Ontario; and The King's University in Edmonton, Alberta.

=== Canadian ministries ===
Within Canada, the CRCNA supports three justice ministries known as the Centre for Public Dialogue, Indigenous Ministry, and Intercultural Ministries.

=== Other departments and offices ===
- Faith Alive Christian Resources – known as CRC Publications until 2007, publishes and distributes books, magazines and learning materials.
- The Banner
- Candidacy Committee
- CRC Foundation
- CRC Loan Fund

== Demographics ==
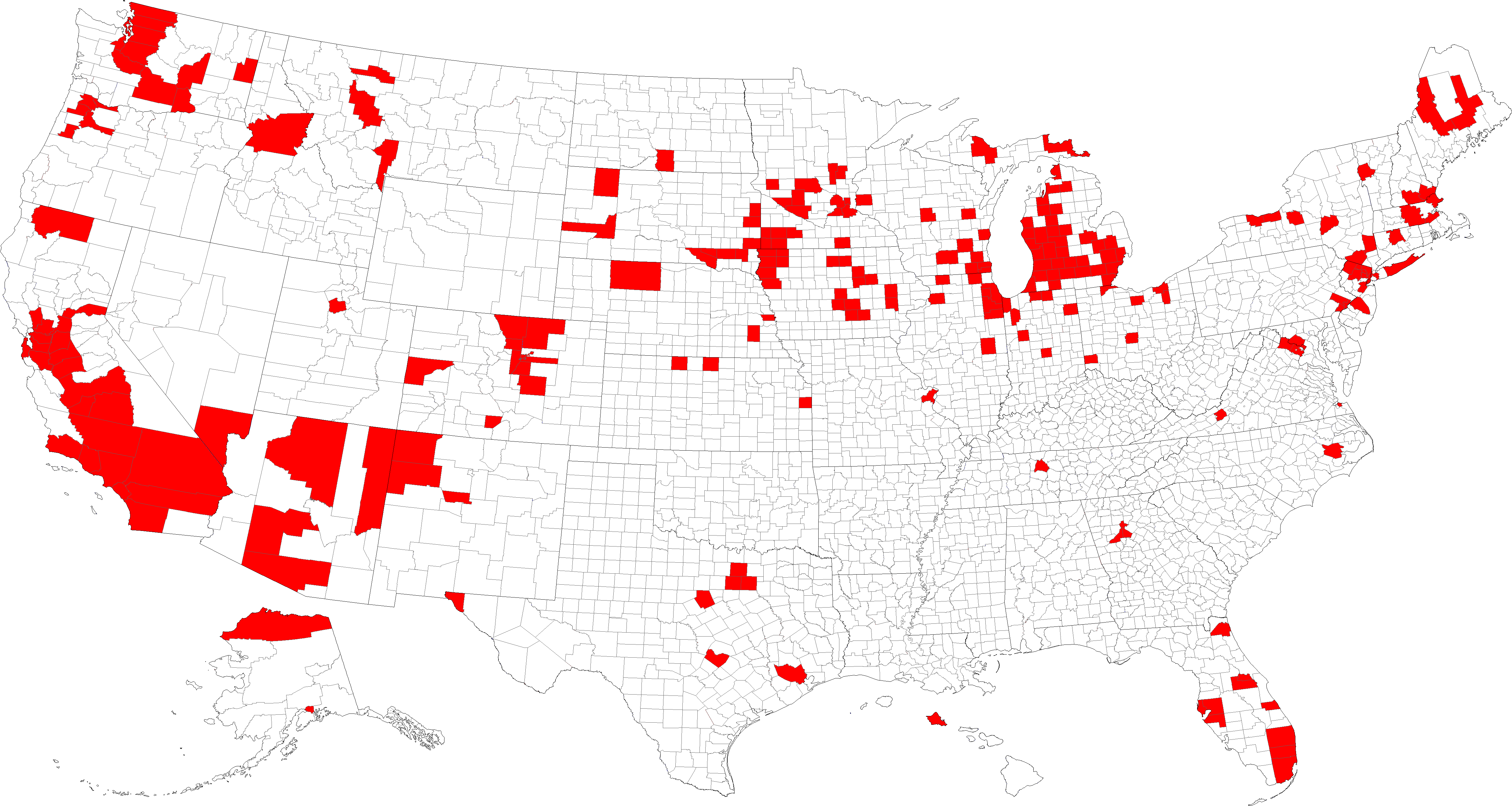
Christian Reformed Churches in the US by county, 2008

Year	Membership	churches
1963	256,015	585
1964	263,178	597
1965	268,165	610
1966	272,461	624
1967	275,530	629
1968	278,869	634
1969	281,523	648
1970	284,737	658
1971	285,628	660
1972	286,094	674
1973	287,114	750
1974	287,553	763
1975	286,371	688
1976	287,503	695
1977	288,024	706
1978	287,656	791
1979	289,011	814
1980	292,379	828
1981	294,354	824
1982	296,706	828
1983	299,685	828
1984	302,436	838
1985	305,228	853
1986	306,309	959
1987	308,993	876
1988	310,160	891
1989	310,014	903
1990	314,226	941
1991	315,086	958
1992	316,415	981
1993	311,202	979
1994	300,320	979
1995	294,179	985
1996	291,796	991
1997	285,864	987
1998	279,029	972
1999	275,466	964
2000	276,376	982
2001	279,068	991
2002	278,944	989
2003	278,798	995
2004	275,708	1,002
2005	273,220	1,021
2006	272,127	1,047
2007	269,221	1,057
2008	268,052	1,049
2009	264,330	1,059
2010	262,588	1,078
2011	255,706	1,084
2012	251,727	1,099
2013	248,258	1,101
2014	245,217	1,103
2015	242,794	1,090
2016	235,921	1,088
2017	234,819	1,091
2018	227,968	1,094
2019	222,156	1,072
2020	216,336	1,063
2021	211,706	1,057
2022	204,664	1,053
2023	195,704	1,015
2024	189,753	1,000
2025	171,770	935

CRC churches are predominantly located in areas of Dutch immigrant settlement in North America, including Brookfield, Wisconsin, Western Michigan, Chicago, the city of Lynden in Washington State, British Columbia, Ontario, Nova Scotia, Prince Edward Island, New Brunswick, Alberta, Iowa, suburban southern California, Ripon, California, and northern New Jersey. About 75% of the CRCNA congregations are located in the US, while the remaining 25% are in Canada. The church has grown more ethnically diverse with some congregations predominantly Native American, Korean, Chinese, Vietnamese, African-American and Hispanic. All together, Christian Reformed Churches speak around 20 languages and over 170 congregations speak a language other than English or Dutch. Many churches, particularly in more urban areas, are becoming much more integrated. Emerging from its role as primarily an immigrant church, the church has become more outward focused in recent years.

== Membership trends ==
After a time of steady growth during the period of 1963–1992, membership totals have declined, even though the number of churches has grown. In 1992, at the height of its membership, the Christian Reformed Churches had 316,415 members in 981 churches in the United States and Canada. In 2025, this number had dropped to 171,770 members in 935 churches.

== Notable members ==
- Herman Baker, founder, Baker Publishing Group
- Louis Berkhof, 1873–1957, prominent Reformed theologian of the 20th century
- Scott Brown, former U.S. Ambassador and former U.S. Senator from Massachusetts
- Richard DeVos, businessman, co-founder of Amway
- Betsy DeVos, former U.S. Secretary of Education
- Calvin B. DeWitt, environmentalist and co-founder of the Evangelical Environmental Network
- Kristin Kobes Du Mez, historian and author
- William B. Eerdmans, founder, William B. Eerdmans Publishing Company
- Vern Ehlers, U.S. Representative from Michigan
- Randy Feenstra U.S. Representative from Iowa
- William K. Frankena, 1908–1994, philosopher, University of Michigan
- Sidney Greidanus, professor of preaching at Calvin Theological Seminary
- Marv Heemeyer, 1951-2004, known for Granby, Colorado bulldozer rampage
- Paul B. Henry, U.S. Representative from Michigan
- Herman Hoeksema, (1886-1965) Reformed theologian who helped found the Protestant Reformed Churches in America
- Bill Huizenga, U.S. Representative from Michigan
- Bill Hybels, pastor of Willow Creek Community Church and founder of Willow Creek Association
- Rienk Kuiper, theologian
- Frederick Manfred, author of Westerns, the pen name of Feike Feikema (1912–1994)
- Manuel Ortiz, pastor, missionary and scholar
- Richard and Joan Ostling, authors and journalists
- Alvin Plantinga, philosopher, University of Notre Dame
- Cornelius Plantinga, theologian, author, president of Calvin Theological Seminary from 2002-2011
- Michael Rea, philosopher, University of Notre Dame
- H. Evan Runner, philosopher
- Hillary Scholten, U.S. Representative from Michigan
- Christian Sebastia, pastor, theologian and music producer
- Calvin Seerveld, philosopher and theologian
- Chris Sievers, Principal, Borculo Christian Schools
- Norman Shepherd, pastor and theologian
- Lewis Smedes, author, ethicist, and theologian (1921–2002)
- The Staal brothers, professional hockey players Eric Staal, Marc Staal, Jordan Staal, and Jared Staal
- Steven R. Timmermans, psychologist, author, former president of Trinity Christian College, executive director of CRCNA 2013–2020
- Jay Van Andel, businessman, co-founder of Amway
- Cornelius Van Til, (1895–1987) Reformed theologian, (raised CRC and attended denominational schools before joining the Orthodox Presbyterian Church)
- Johanna Veenstra (1894-1933), missionary to Nigeria
- Geerhardus Vos (1862–1949), theologian, "Father of Reformed Biblical Theology"
- Albert Wolters, philosopher
- Nicholas Wolterstorff, philosopher, Yale University
- Jerry Zandstra, conservative activist

== See also ==
The Christian Reformed Church is not a worldwide organization but has similar, independent church bodies in other lands.

- Christian Reformed Churches (Christelijke Gereformeerde Kerken), a different denomination with a similar name in the Netherlands
- Christian Reformed Churches of Australia
- Christian Reformed Church in Costa Rica
- Christian Reformed Church in Cuba
- Christian Reformed Church of the Dominican Republic
- Christian Reformed Church in Eastern Africa
- Christian Reformed Church in El Salvador
- Christian Reformed Church in Haiti
- Christian Reformed Church in Honduras
- Christian Reformed Church in Myanmar
- Christian Reformed Church in Nicaragua
- Christian Reformed Church of Nigeria
- Christian Reformed Church in Sierra Leone
- Christian Reformed Church in South Africa
- Christian Reformed Church in Sri Lanka (formerly known as the Dutch Reformed Church in Sri Lanka)
- Christian Reformed Church in the Philippines
- Reformed Church in America
- The Banner (The Banner of Truth) Magazine
- Christian Labor Association
