= Richard Muller (theologian) =

American historical theologian (born 1948)

Richard A. Muller
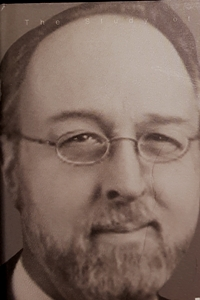
- Title: P. J. Zondervan Professor of Historical Theology Emeritus
- Awards: Mellon Post-Doctoral Research Grant

Academic background
- Education: Queens College, City University of New York (B.A., 1969); Union Theological Seminary (M.Div., 1972); Duke University (Ph.D., 1976)

Academic work
- Discipline: Historical theology, Reformation studies
- Institutions: Fuller Theological Seminary (1980–1992); Calvin Theological Seminary
- Main interests: Reformation, Reformed scholasticism, Protestant orthodoxy
- Notable works: Post-Reformation Reformed Dogmatics

Richard A. Muller (born October 12, 1948, in Flushing, New York) is an American historian of theology and professor emeritus at Calvin Theological Seminary in Grand Rapids, Michigan. A leading scholar of Reformation and post-Reformation thought, he is best known for his work on Reformed scholasticism and Protestant orthodoxy, particularly through his multi-volume study Post-Reformation Reformed Dogmatics. Muller has taught at Fuller Theological Seminary and served on the editorial boards of the Sixteenth Century Journal and the Reformation and Renaissance Review.

== Early life and education ==
Muller obtained his B.A. in history from Queens College, City University of New York in 1969, his M.Div. from Union Theological Seminary, New York in 1972, and his Ph.D. in Reformation studies from Duke University in 1976.

== Career ==
Muller taught at Fuller Theological Seminary from 1980 to 1992. He was awarded a Mellon Post-Doctoral Research Grant and held the Belle van Zuylenleerstoel at Utrecht University in 1999. He has served on the editorial boards of Sixteenth Century Journal and Reformation and Renaissance Review. He began teaching at Calvin Theological Seminary in 1992, and retired in 2015. Currently he is P. J. Zondervan Professor of Historical Theology Emeritus and senior fellow of the Junius Institute for Digital Reformation Research at Calvin Theological Seminary in Grand Rapids, Michigan. In addition, he is a retired minister in the Christian Reformed Church of North America.

== Research and scholarship ==
Muller's research and writing has been largely focused on the reassessment of the development of Protestant thought after the Reformation, with emphasis on the nature and character of Protestant orthodoxy and Reformed scholasticism in the seventeenth century. Muller is one of the historians credited with setting aside the "Calvin against the Calvinists" theory of developing Reformed thought. His argument is that the attempt to define the entire Reformed tradition in terms of the thought of Calvin is a historical error, inasmuch as Calvin was one of several second generation codifiers of the tradition and inasmuch as the tradition itself was, early on, rather diverse and variegated. The "Calvin against the Calvinists" thesis tended to claim in a rather reductionistic way that Calvin was a "christocentric" theologian in contrast to later Reformed thinkers who had developed a radical predestinarian or deterministic metaphysics. By contrast Muller has argued that the later Reformed thinkers did not develop a predestinarian system but instead understood theology in terms of a series of biblically and traditionally based loci or topics. Their thought does differ in places from Calvin's, but the differences are to be explained on the basis of other sources of the Reformed tradition, such as the thought of Martin Bucer, Heinrich Bullinger, Peter Martyr Vermigli, and others, on the basis of alterations in debate and historical context.

== Personal life ==
Muller is married and has two children.

== Works ==
=== Books ===
- Dictionary of Latin and Greek Theological Terms: Drawn Principally from Protestant Scholastic Theology. 1st. ed. Grand Rapids: Baker, 1985.
- Christ and the Decree: Christology and Predestination in Reformed Theology from Calvin to Perkins. Durham: Labyrinth, 1986; Grand Rapids: Baker, 1988. Reprinted with a new preface, Grand Rapids: Baker Academic, 2008.
- Post-Reformation Reformed Dogmatics. 2 vols. Grand Rapids: Baker, 1987–1993.
- God, Creation, and Providence in the Thought of Jacob Arminius: Sources and Directions of Scholastic Protestantism in the Era of Early Orthodoxy. Grand Rapids: Baker, 1991.
- The Study of Theology: From Biblical Interpretation to Contemporary Formulation. Grand Rapids: Zondervan, 1991. Reprinted in Moisés Silva, ed., Foundations of Contemporary Interpretation (Grand Rapids: Zondervan, 1996).
- Bradley, James E., and Richard A. Muller. Church History: An Introduction to Research, Reference Works, and Methods. Grand Rapids: Eerdmans, 1995.
- The Unaccommodated Calvin: Studies in the Foundation of a Theological Tradition. New York: Oxford University Press, 2000.
- Chonggyo Kaehyok Hu Kaehyokchuui Kyouihak: Sinhak Soron [Post-Reformation Reformed Dogmatics. Vol. 1, Prolegomena to Theology] [title transliterated from Korean]. Translated by Un-son Yi. Seoul: Jireh, 2002.
- Saegi Meklakesso Bon Jinjunghan Calvang Shinhak [The Unaccommodated Calvin] [title transliterated from Korean]. Translated by Eun-Sun Lee. Seoul: Sharing & Serving, 2003.
- After Calvin: Studies in the Development of a Theological Tradition. New York: Oxford University Press, 2003.
- Post-Reformation Reformed Dogmatics: The Rise and Development of Reformed Orthodoxy, ca. 1520 to ca. 1725. 2nd ed. 4 vols. Grand Rapids: Baker Academic, 2003.
- Muller, Richard A., and Rowland S. Ward. Scripture and Worship: Biblical Interpretation and the Directory for Public Worship. Phillipsburg: Presbyterian & Reformed, 2007.
- Calvin Ihu Gaehyŏk Shinhak [After Calvin] [title transliterated from Korean]. Translated by Byung-Soo Han. Seoul: Revival and Reformation, 2011.
- Calvin and the Reformed Tradition: On the Work of Christ and the Order of Salvation. Grand Rapids: Baker Academic, 2012.
- Divine Will and Human Choice: Freedom, Contingency, and Necessity in Early Modern Reformed Thought. Grand Rapids: Baker Academic, 2017.
- Dictionary of Latin and Greek Theological Terms: Drawn Principally from Protestant Scholastic Theology. 2nd. ed. Grand Rapids: Baker, 2017.
- Grace and Freedom: William Perkins and the Early Modern Reformed Understanding of Free Choice and Divine Grace. New York: Oxford University Press, 2020.

=== Edited books ===
- Bradley, James E., and Richard A. Muller, ed. Church, Word, and Spirit: Historical and Theological Essays in Honor of Geoffrey W. Bromiley. Grand Rapids: Eerdmans, 1987.
- Shuster, Marguerite, and Richard A. Muller, ed. Perspectives on Christology: Essays in Honor of Paul K. Jewett. Grand Rapids: Zondervan, 1991.
- Muller, Richard A., and John L. Thompson, ed. Biblical Interpretation in the Era of the Reformation: Essays Presented to David C. Steinmetz in Honor of His Sixtieth Birthday. Grand Rapids: Eerdmans, 1996.

=== Articles in periodicals ===
- “Examining Book of Confessions.” [author’s corrected title: “Presbyterians, Confessional and Confessing”]. Presbyterian Survey 66.7 (1976): 43–44.
- “One Faith in Three Basic Forms: Heidelberg, Westminster, and the New Declaration.” Presbyterian Survey 67.1 (1977): 7–9.
- “Perkins’ A Golden Chaine: Predestinarian System or Schematized Ordo Salutis?” Sixteenth Century Journal 9.1 (1978): 69–81.
- “‘Duplex cognitio dei’ in the Theology of Early Reformed Orthodoxy.” Sixteenth Century Journal 10.2 (1979): 51–61.
- “The Foundation of Calvin’s Theology: Scripture as Revealing God’s Word” [author’s corrected title: “Scripture as Revealing Word: The Foundation of Calvin’s Theology”]. Duke Divinity School Review 44.1 (1979): 14–23.
- “Covenant and Conscience in English Reformed Theology: Three Variations on a 17th Century Theme.” Westminster Theological Journal 42.2 (1980): 308–334.
- “The Debate Over the Vowel Points and the Crisis in Orthodox Hermeneutics.” Journal of Medieval and Renaissance Studies 10.1 (1980): 53–72.
- “Christ in the Eschaton: Calvin and Moltmann on the Duration of the Munus Regium.” Harvard Theological Review 74.1 (1981): 31–59.
- “The Spirit and the Covenant: John Gill’s Critique of the Pactum Salutis.” Foundations 24.1 (1981): 4–14.
- “The Federal Motif in Seventeenth Century Arminian Theology.” Nederlands archief voor kerkgeschiedenis 62.1 (1982): 102–122.
- “Henry Boynton Smith: Christocentric Theologian.” Journal of Presbyterian History 61.4 (1982): 429–444.
- “Christ—the Revelation or the Revealer? Brunner and Reformed Orthodoxy on the Doctrine of the Word of God.” Journal of the Evangelical Theological Society 26.3 (1983): 307–319.
- “Incarnation, Immutability, and the Case for Classical Theism.” Westminster Theological Journal 45.1 (1983): 22–40.
- “The Administrator.” Theology News & Notes 31.3 (1984): 12–13.
- “Vera philosophia cum sacra theologia nusquam pugnat: Keckermann on Philosophy, Theology, and the Problem of Double Truth.” Sixteenth Century Journal 15.3 (1984): 341–365.
- “Giving Direction to Theology: The Scholastic Dimension.” Journal of the Evangelical Theological Society 28.2 (1985): 183–193.
- Muller, Richard A., and Hendrika Vande Kemp. “On Psychologists’ Uses of ‘Calvinism’.” American Psychologist 40.4 (1985): 466–468.
- “Emanuel V. Gerhart on the ‘Christ-Idea’ as Fundamental Principle.” Westminster Theological Journal 48.1 (1986): 97–117.
- “Scholasticism Protestant and Catholic: Francis Turretin on the Object and Principles of Theology.” Church History 55.2 (1986): 193–205.
- “What I Haven’t Learned from Barth.” Reformed Journal 37.3 (1987): 16–18.
- “The Christological Problem in the Thought of Jacobus Arminius.” Nederlands archief voor kerkgeschiedenis 68.2 (1988): 145–163.
- “Arminius and the Scholastic Tradition.” Calvin Theological Journal 24.2 (1989): 263–277.
- “The Importance of History.” Theology News & Notes 36.1 (1989): 14–17, 26.
- “Karl Barth and the Path of Theology into the Twentieth Century: Historical Observations.” Westminster Theological Journal 51.1 (1989): 25–50.
- “The Barth Legacy: New Athanasius or Origen Redivivus? A Response to T.F. Torrance.” Thomist 54.4 (1990): 673–704.
- “Fides and Cognitio in Relation to the Problem of Intellect and Will in the Theology of John Calvin.” Calvin Theological Journal 25.2 (1990): 207–224.
- “J.J. Rambach and the Dogmatics of Scholastic Pietism.” Consensus 16.2 (1990): 7–27.
- “Always Reforming: Unending Change or Unchanging Ends?” Banner 127.37 (26 October 1992): 8–9.
- “The Dogmatic Function of St. Thomas’ ‘Proofs’: A Protestant Appreciation.” Fides et historia 24.2 (1992): 15–29.
- “How Many Points?” Calvin Theological Journal 28.2 (1993): 425–433.
- “The Priority of the Intellect in the Soteriology of Jacob Arminius.” Westminster Theological Journal 55.1 (1993): 55–72.
- “Confessing the Reformed Faith: Our Identity in Unity and Diversity.” Pts. 1 and 2. New Horizons in the Orthodox Presbyterian Church 15.3 (1994): 8–10; no. 4 (1994): 20–21. Also published in Outlook 44.9 (1994): 7–11. Reprinted in John R. Muether and Danny E. Olinger, ed., Confident of Better Things: Essays Commemorating Seventy-five Years of the Orthodox Presbyterian Church (Willow Grove, PA: The Committee for the Historian of the Orthodox Presbyterian Church, 2011), 85–97.
- “The Covenant of Works and the Stability of Divine Law in Seventeenth-Century Reformed Orthodoxy: A Study in the Theology of Herman Witsius and Wilhelmus à Brakel.” Calvin Theological Journal 29.1 (1994): 75–100.
- “The Study of Theology Revisited: A Response to John Frame.” Westminster Theological Journal 56.2 (1994): 409–417.
- “Tertullian & Church Growth.” Calvin Seminary Forum 1.3 (1994): 8.
- “Calvin and the ‘Calvinists’: Assessing Continuities and Discontinuities between the Reformation and Orthodoxy [Part One].” Calvin Theological Journal 30.2 (1995): 345–375.
- “The Myth of ‘Decretal Theology’.” Calvin Theological Journal 30.1 (1995): 159–167.
- “On Being Reformed in America.” Calvin Seminary Forum 2.3 (1995): 1–2.
- “Would We Still Need a Reformation Today?” Banner 130.37 (30 October 1995): 16–18.
- “Calvin and the ‘Calvinists’: Assessing Continuities and Discontinuities between the Reformation and Orthodoxy [Part Two].” Calvin Theological Journal 31.1 (1996): 125–160.
- Bolt, John, and Richard A. Muller. “Does the Church Today Need a New ‘Mission Paradigm’?” Calvin Theological Journal 31.1 (1996): 196–208.
- Bolt, John, and Richard A. Muller. “For the Sake of the Church: A Response to Van Gelder and Hart.” Calvin Theological Journal 31.2 (1996): 520–526.
- “Found (No Thanks to Theodore Beza): One ‘Decretal’ Theology.” Calvin Theological Journal 32.1 (1997): 145–151.
- “Historiography in the Service of Theology and Worship: Toward Dialogue with John Frame.” Westminster Theological Journal 59.2 (1997): 301–310.
- “The Holy Spirit in the Augsburg Confession: A Reformed Definition.” Concordia Theological Quarterly 61.1–2 (1997): 53–78.
- “In the Light of Orthodoxy: The ‘Method and Disposition’ of Calvin’s Institutio from the Perspective of Calvin’s Late-Sixteenth-Century Editors.” Sixteenth Century Journal 28.4 (1997): 1203–1229.
- “Calvin’s ‘Argument du livre’ (1541): An Erratum to the McNeill and Battles Institutes.” Sixteenth Century Journal 29.1 (1998): 35–38.
- “Scholasticism, Reformation, Orthodoxy, and the Persistence of Christian Aristotelianism.” Trinity Journal, n.s., 19.1 (1998): 81–96.
- “Protestant Scholasticism: Methodological Issues and Problems in the Study of Its Development.” Areopagus [Universiteit Utrecht], n.s., 3.3 (1999): 14–19.
- “Eunhae, Suntak, Geurigo Ooyeunjeokin Suntak—Arminius eui Sunsoo Gonggyeukgwa Gaehyukpa eui Baneung” [“Grace, Election, and Contingent Choice: Arminius’s Gambit and the Reformed Response”] [title transliterated from Korean]. Translated by Eun Sun Lee. Shin Hak Ji Pyung [Seoul, Korea] 12 (2000): 213–254.
- “Directions in Current Calvin Research.” Religious Studies Review 27.2 (2001): 131–138.
- “Reformation, Orthodoxy, ‘Christian Aristotelianism,’ and the Eclecticism of Early Modern Philosophy.” Nederlands archief voor kerkgeschiedenis 81.3 (2001): 306–325.
- “The Placement of Predestination in Reformed Theology: Issue or Non-Issue?” Calvin Theological Journal 40.2 (2005): 184–210.
- “Divine Covenants, Absolute and Conditional: John Cameron and the Early Orthodox Development of Reformed Covenant Theology.” Mid-America Journal of Theology 17 (2006): 11–56.
- “A Note on ‘Christocentrism’ and the Imprudent Use of Such Terminology.” Westminster Theological Journal 68.2 (2006): 253–260.
- “Toward the Pactum Salutis: Locating the Origins of a Concept.” Mid-America Journal of Theology 18 (2007): 11–65.
- “Arminius and the Reformed Tradition.” Westminster Theological Journal 70.1 (2008): 19–48.
- “Unity and Distinction: The Nature of God in the Theology of Lucas Trelcatius, Jr.” Reformation and Renaissance Review 10.3 (2008): 315–341.
- “Calvin on Sacramental Presence, in the Shadow of Marburg and Zurich.” Lutheran Quarterly n.s., 23.2 (2009): 147–167.
- “De Zurich ou Bâle à Strasbourg? Étude sur les prémices de la pensée eucharistique de Calvin.” Translated by Liliane Crété. In “Calvin et la France,” edited by Bernard Cottrett and Olivier Millet, special issue, Bulletin de la Société de l’Histoire du Protestantisme Français 155.1 (2009): 41–53.
- “A Tale of Two Wills? Calvin and Amyraut on Ezekiel 18:23.” Calvin Theological Journal 44.2 (2009): 211–225.
- “Combien de Points?” La Revue Farel 5 (2010): 123–132.
- “From Zürich or from Wittenberg? An Examination of Calvin’s Early Eucharistic Thought.” Calvin Theological Journal 45.2 (2010): 243–255.
- “Jonathan Edwards and the Absence of Free Choice: A Parting of the Ways in the Reformed Tradition.” Jonathan Edwards Studies 1.1 (2011): 3–22.
- “Reassessing the Relation of Reformation and Orthodoxy: A Methodological Rejoinder.” American Theological Inquiry 4.1 (2011): 3–12.
- “The ‘Reception of Calvin’ in Later Reformed Theology: Concluding Thoughts.” Church History and Religious Culture 91.1–2 (2011): 255–274.
- “The Canons of Dort.” Calvin Seminary Forum 20.1 (2013): 11–12.

=== Articles in books ===
- “The Hermeneutic of Promise and Fulfillment in Calvin’s Exegesis of the Old Testament Prophecies of the Kingdom.” In The Bible in the Sixteenth Century, edited by David C. Steinmetz, 68–82. Durham: Duke, 1990.
- “The Christological Problem as Addressed by Friedrich Schleiermacher: A Dogmatic Query.” In Perspectives on Christology, edited by Marguerite Shuster and Richard A. Muller, 141–162. Grand Rapids: Zondervan, 1991.
- “Joseph Hall as Rhetor, Theologian, and Exegete: His Contribution to the History of Interpretation.” In Solomon’s Divine Arts, by Joseph Hall, edited by Gerald T. Sheppard, 11–37. Cleveland: Pilgrim, 1991.
- “The Role of Church History in the Study of Systematic Theology.” In Doing Theology in Today’s World: Essays in Honor of Kenneth S. Kantzer, edited by John D. Woodbridge and Thomas Edward McComiskey, 77–97. Grand Rapids: Zondervan, 1991.
- “William Perkins and the Protestant Exegetical Tradition: Interpretation, Style and Method.” In A Commentary on Hebrews 11 (1609 Edition), by William Perkins, edited by John H. Augustine, 71–94. New York: Pilgrim, 1991.
- “Calvin, Beza, and the Exegetical History of Romans 13:1–7.” In Calvin and the State, edited by Peter De Klerk, 139–170. Papers of the 1989 and 1991 Calvin Studies Colloquia. Grand Rapids: Calvin Studies Society, 1993.
- Response to “Discourse and Doctrine: The Covenant Concept in the Middle Ages,” by Derk Visser. In Calvin and the State, edited by Peter De Klerk, 15–19. Papers of the 1989 and 1991 Calvin Studies Society Colloquia. Grand Rapids: Calvin Studies Society, 1993.
- “God, Predestination, and the Integrity of the Created Order: A Note on Patterns in Arminius’ Theology.” In Later Calvinism: International Perspectives, edited by W. Fred Graham, 431–446. Kirksville: Sixteenth Century Journal Publishers, 1994.
- “Grace, Election, and Contingent Choice: Arminius’s Gambit and the Reformed Response.” In The Grace of God, the Bondage of the Will, vol. 2, Historical and Theological Perspectives on Calvinism, edited by Thomas R. Schreiner and Bruce A. Ware, 251–278. Grand Rapids: Baker, 1995.
- “Biblical Interpretation in the Era of the Reformation: The View from the Middle Ages.” In Biblical Interpretation in the Era of the Reformation, edited by Richard A. Muller and John L. Thompson, 3–22. Grand Rapids: Eerdmans, 1996.
- “The Era of Protestant Orthodoxy.” In Theological Education in the Evangelical Tradition, edited by D.G. Hart and R. Albert Mohler Jr., 103–128. Grand Rapids: Baker, 1996.
- “‘The Only Way of Man’s Salvation’: Scripture in the Westminster Confession.” In Calvin Studies VIII: The Westminster Confession in Current Thought, edited by John H. Leith, 14–33. Colloquium on Calvin Studies. [Davidson: Davidson College, 1996].
- Muller, Richard A., and John L. Thompson. “The Significance of Precritical Exegesis: Retrospect and Prospect.” In Biblical Interpretation in the Era of the Reformation, edited by Richard A. Muller and John L. Thompson, 335–345. Grand Rapids: Eerdmans, 1996.
- “John Gill and the Reformed Tradition: A Study in the Reception of Protestant Orthodoxy in the Eighteenth Century.” In The Life and Thought of John Gill (1697–1771): A Tercentennial Appreciation, edited by Michael A.G. Haykin, 51–68. Leiden: Brill, 1997.
- “Scholasticism in Calvin: A Question of Relation and Disjunction.” In Calvinus sincerioris religionis vindex = Calvin as Protector of the Purer Religion, edited by Wilhelm H. Neuser and Brian G. Armstrong, 247–265. Kirksville: Sixteenth Century Journal Publishers, 1997.
- “‘Scimus enim quod lex spiritualis est’: Melanchthon and Calvin on the Interpretation of Romans 7.14–23.” In Philip Melanchthon (1497–1560) and the Commentary, edited by Timothy J. Wengert and M. Patrick Graham, 216–237. Sheffield: Sheffield Academic, 1997.
- “Calvin, Beza, and the Exegetical History of Romans 13:1–7.” In The Identity of Geneva: The Christian Commonwealth, 1564–1864, edited by John B. Roney and Martin I. Klauber, 39–56. Westport: Greenwood, 1998.
- “Directions in Current Calvin Research.” In Calvin Studies IX, edited by John H. Leith and Robert A. Johnson, 70–87. Colloquium on Calvin Studies. [Davidson: Davidson College, 1998].
- “Ordo docendi: Melanchthon and the Organization of Calvin’s Institutes, 1536–1543.” In Melanchthon in Europe: His Work and Influence beyond Wittenberg, edited by Karin Maag, 123–140. Grand Rapids: Baker, 1999.
- “The Use and Abuse of a Document: Beza’s Tabula Praedestinationis, the Bolsec Controversy, and the Origins of Reformed Orthodoxy.” In Protestant Scholasticism: Essays in Reassessment, edited by Carl R. Trueman and R. Scott Clark, 33–61. Carlisle: Paternoster, 1999.
- “Sources of Reformed Orthodoxy: The Symmetrical Unity of Exegesis and Synthesis.” In A Confessing Theology for Postmodern Times, edited by Michael S. Horton, 43–62. Wheaton: Crossway, 2000.
- “The Problem of Protestant Scholasticism—A Review and Definition.” In Reformation and Scholasticism: An Ecumenical Enterprise, edited by Willem J. van Asselt and Eef Dekker, 45–64. Grand Rapids: Baker Academic, 2001.
- “Theodore Beza (1519–1605).” In The Reformation Theologians: An Introduction to Theology in the Early Modern Period, edited by Carter Lindberg, 213–224. Oxford: Blackwell, 2002.
- “‘To Grant this Grace to All People and Nations’: Calvin on Apostolicity and Mission.” In For God so Loved the World: Missiological Reflections in Honour of Roger S. Greenway, edited by Arie C. Leder, 211–232. Belleville: Essence, 2006.
- “Reflections on Persistent Whiggism and Its Antidotes in the Study of Sixteenthand Seventeenth-Century Intellectual History.” In Seeing Things Their Way: Intellectual History and the Return of Religion, edited by Alister Chapman, John Coffey, and Brad S. Gregory, 134–153. Notre Dame: University of Notre Dame Press, 2009.
- “God as Absolute and Relative, Necessary, Free, and Contingent: The Ad Intra-Ad Extra Movement of Seventeenth-Century Reformed Language about God.” In Always Reformed: Essays in Honor of W. Robert Godfrey, edited by R. Scott Clark and Joel E. Kim, 56–73. Escondido: Westminster Seminary California, 2010.
- Mylius, R.A. [Richard A. Muller]. “In the Steps of Voetius: Synchronic Contingency and the Significance of Cornelis Elleboogius’ Disputationes de Tetragrammatoto the Analysis of His Life and Work.” In Scholasticism Reformed: Essays in Honour of Willem J. van Asselt, edited by Maarten Wisse, Marcel Sarot, and Willemien Otten, 92–102. Leiden: Brill, 2010.
- “Philip Doddridge and the Formulation of Calvinistic Theology in an Era of Rationalism and Deconfessionalization.” In Religion, Politics and Dissent, 1660–1832: Essays in Honour of James E. Bradley, edited by Robert D. Cornwall and William Gibson, 65–84. Farnham: Ashgate, 2010.
- “Thomas Barlow on the Liabilities of ‘New Philosophy’: Perceptions of a Rebellious Ancilla in the Era of Protestant Orthodoxy.” In Scholasticism Reformed, edited by Maarten Wisse, Marcel Sarot, and Willemien Otten, 179–195. Leiden: Brill, 2010.
- “Demoting Calvin: The Issue of Calvin and the Reformed Tradition.” In John Calvin, Myth and Reality: Images and Impact of Geneva’s Reformer, edited by Amy Nelson Burnett, 3–17. Papers of the 2009 Calvin Studies Society Colloquium. Eugene: Cascade, 2011.
- “Diversity in the Reformed Tradition: A Historiographical Introduction.” In Drawn into Controversie: Reformed Theological Diversity and Debates Within Seventeenth-Century British Puritanism, edited by Michael A.G. Haykin and Mark Jones, 11–30. Göttingen: Vandenhoeck & Ruprecht, 2011.
- “Reception and Response: Referencing and Understanding Calvin in SeventeenthCentury Calvinism.” In Calvin and His Influence, 1509–2009, edited by Irena Backus and Philip Benedict, 182–201. Oxford: Oxford University Press, 2011.
- “God and Design in the Thought of Robert Boyle.” In The Persistence of the Sacred in Modern Thought, edited by Chris L. Firestone and Nathan A. Jacobs, 87–111. Notre Dame: University of Notre Dame Press, 2012.

=== Dictionary and encyclopedia entries ===
- “Resurrection.” In The International Standard Bible Encyclopedia, vol. 4, edited by Geoffrey W. Bromiley, et al., 145–150. Grand Rapids: Eerdmans, 1988.
- “Sanctification.” In The International Standard Bible Encyclopedia, vol. 4, edited by Geoffrey W. Bromiley, et al., 321–331. Grand Rapids: Eerdmans, 1988.
- “World.” In The International Standard Bible Encyclopedia, vol. 4, edited by Geoffrey W. Bromiley, et al., 1112–1116. Grand Rapids: Eerdmans, 1988.
- “Soul.” In Dictionary of Pastoral Care and Counseling, edited by Rodney J. Hunter, et al., 1201–1203. Nashville: Abingdon, 1990. Reprinted in Hunter, et al., ed., Dictionary of Pastoral Care and Counseling, expanded ed. (2005): 1201–1203; and in Glenn H. Asquith Jr., ed., The Concise Dictionary of Pastoral Care and Counseling (Nashville: Abingdon, 2010), 30–34.
- “Aristotle.” In Great Thinkers of the Western World, edited by Ian P. McGreal, 30–35. New York: HarperCollins, 1992.
- “Benedict Spinoza.” In Great Thinkers of the Western World, edited by Ian P. McGreal, 217–221. New York: HarperCollins, 1992.
- “Freedom.” In Encyclopedia of the Reformed Faith, edited by Donald K. McKim, 144–146. Louisville: Westminster John Knox Press, 1992.
- “Gottfried Wilhelm Leibniz.” In Great Thinkers of the Western World, edited by Ian P. McGreal, 237–242. New York: HarperCollins, 1992.
- “Justification.” In Encyclopedia of the Reformed Faith, edited by Donald K. McKim, 201–203. Louisville: Westminster John Knox Press, 1992.
- “Musculus, Wolfgang (1497–1563).” In Encyclopedia of the Reformed Faith, edited by Donald K. McKim, 248. Louisville: Westminster John Knox Press, 1992.
- “Myconius, Oswald (1488–1552).” In Encyclopedia of the Reformed Faith, edited by Donald K. McKim, 248. Louisville: Westminster John Knox Press, 1992.
- “Orthodoxy, Reformed.” In Encyclopedia of the Reformed Faith, edited by Donald K. McKim, 266–269. Louisville: Westminster John Knox Press, 1992.
- “Parmenides.” In Great Thinkers of the Western World, edited by Ian P. McGreal, 3–6. New York: HarperCollins, 1992.
- “Saint Thomas Aquinas.” In Great Thinkers of the Western World, edited by Ian P. McGreal, 107–113. New York: HarperCollins, 1992.
- “Predestination.” In The Oxford Encyclopedia of the Reformation, vol. 3, edited by Hans J. Hillerbrand, 332–338. New York: Oxford University Press, 1996.
- “Scripture.” In The Oxford Encyclopedia of the Reformation, vol. 4, edited by Hans J. Hillerbrand, 36–39. New York: Oxford University Press, 1996.
- “Biblical Interpretation in the Sixteenth and Seventeenth Centuries.” In Historical Handbook of Major Biblical Interpreters, edited by Donald K. McKim, 123–152. Downers Grove: InterVarsity Press, 1998. Reprinted in McKim, ed., Dictionary of Major Biblical Interpreters (2007): 22–44.
- “John Lightfoot (1602–1675).” In Historical Handbook of Major Biblical Interpreters, edited by Donald K. McKim, 208–212. Downers Grove: InterVarsity Press, 1998. Reprinted in McKim, ed., Dictionary of Major Biblical Interpreters (2007): 657–661.
- “Beza, Theodore.” In The Encyclopedia of Christianity, vol. 1, edited by Erwin Fahlbusch, et al., English edition translated and edited by Geoffrey W. Bromiley, 231–232. Grand Rapids: Eerdmans; Leiden: Brill, 1999.
- “Reformation, Augustinianism in the.” In Augustine through the Ages: An Encyclopedia, edited by Allan D. Fitzgerald, 705–707. Grand Rapids: Eerdmans, 1999.
- “Arminius and Arminianism.” In The Dictionary of Historical Theology, edited by Trevor A. Hart, 33–35. Carlisle: Paternoster; Grand Rapids: Eerdmans, 2000.
- “Reformed Confessions and Catechisms.” In The Dictionary of Historical Theology, edited by Trevor A. Hart, 466–485. Carlisle: Paternoster; Grand Rapids: Eerdmans, 2000.
- “Orthodoxy: 2. Reformed Orthodoxy.” In The Encyclopedia of Christianity, vol. 3, edited by Erwin Fahlbusch, et al., English edition translated and edited by Geoffrey W. Bromiley, 878–882. Grand Rapids: Eerdmans; Leiden: Brill, 2003.
- “John Calvin and Later Calvinism: The Identity of the Reformed Tradition.” In The Cambridge Companion to Reformation Theology, edited by David Bagchi and David C. Steinmetz, 130–149. Cambridge: Cambridge University Press, 2004.

=== Published lectures ===
- Scholasticism and Orthodoxy in the Reformed Tradition: An Attempt at Definition. Inaugural Address, Calvin Seminary Chapel, 7 September 1995. Grand Rapids: Calvin Theological Seminary, 1995.
- Ad fontes argumentorum: The Sources of Reformed Theology in the 17th Century. Inaugural lecture, Faculty of Theology of Utrecht University, 11 May 1999. Utrecht: Faculteit der Godgeleerdheid van de Universiteit Utrecht, 1999.
- “Was Calvin a Calvinist?” In Back to the Bible: Life, Gospel, and Church, edited by the Society for Reformed Life Theology [sic] and Korea Evangelical Society, 2–37. International Joint Conference Commemorating the 35th Anniversary of Baekseok Schools. Cheonan, Korea: Society for Reformed Life Theology and Korea Evangelical Theological Society, 2011.

=== Forewords and prefaces ===
- Foreword to The Theater of His Glory: Nature and the Natural Order in the Thought of John Calvin, by Susan E. Schreiner, ix-x. Grand Rapids: Baker, 1995.
- Preface to Systematic Theology, new ed., by Louis Berkhof, v-viii. Grand Rapids: Eerdmans, 1996.
- Foreword to John Calvin and the Will: A Critique and Corrective, by Dewey J. Hoitenga Jr., 5–11. Grand Rapids: Baker, 1997.
- Foreword to Sermons on Melchizedek & Abraham: Justification, Faith & Obedience, by John Calvin, translated by Thomas Stocker. Willow Street: Old Paths, 2000.
- Foreword to Introduction to Reformed Scholasticism, by Willem J. van Asselt, et al., ix–x. Grand Rapids: Reformation Heritage Books, 2011.
- Foreword to Unity and Continuity in Covenantal Thought: A Study in the Reformed Tradition to the Westminster Assembly, by Andrew A. Woolsey, vii–xi. Grand Rapids: Reformation Heritage Books, 2012.

=== Translations ===
- Ellul, Jacques. “Theological Pluralism and the Unity of the Spirit.” Translated by Richard A. Muller. In Church, Word, and Spirit, edited by James E. Bradley and Richard A. Muller, 215–227. Grand Rapids: Eerdmans, 1987.

=== Book reviews ===
- Review of The Church, by G.C. Berkouwer, translated by James E. Davison. Westminster Theological Journal 39.2 (1977): 397–399.
- Review of Calvin and Classical Philosophy, by Charles Partee. Sixteenth Century Journal 9.2 (1978): 125–126.
- Review of Méthode et théologie: Lambert Daneau et les débuts de la scolastique réformée, by Olivier Fatio. Westminster Theological Journal 41.1 (1978): 215–217.
- Review of The Prism of Scripture: Studies on History and Historicity in the Work of Jonathan Edwards, by Karl Dietrich Pfisterer. Westminster Theological Journal40.2 (1978): 364–366.
- Review of Reformed Dogmatics Set Out and Illustrated from the Sources, by Heinrich Heppe, revised and edited by Ernst Bizer, translated by G.T. Thomson. Church History 48.3 (1979): 355–356.
- Review of The History of Interpretation, by Frederic W. Farrar. Reformed Journal30.9 (1980): 31.
- Review of Rhétorique et théologique: Calvin, Le Commentaire de l’Épître aux Romains, by Benoit Girardin. Church History 49.3 (1980): 354.
- Review of Calvin and the Reformation: Four Studies by Emile Doumergue, August Lang, Herman Bavinck, and Benjamin B. Warfield, edited by William Park Armstrong. Church History 50.4 (1981): 477.
- “Understanding Covenant Theology Today.” Review of The Christ of the Covenants, by O. Palmer Robertson, and Gospel & Law: Contrast or Continuum? The Hermeneutics of Dispensationalism and Covenant Theology, by Daniel P. Fuller. Reformed Journal 31.11 (1981): 23–24.
- “How Scripture Works.” Review of The Scope and Authority of the Bible, by James Barr. Reformed Journal 32.1 (1982): 26–27.
- “Reformed and Contemporary.” Review of An Introduction to Reformed Dogmatics, by Auguste Lecerf, translated by André Schlemmer. Reformed Journal 32.8 (1982): 27–28.
- Review of Calvin and the Anabaptist Radicals, by Willem Balke, translated by William J. Heynen. Westminster Theological Journal 44.2 (1982): 376–378.
- Review of The Divine Community: Trinity, Church, and Ethics in Reformation Theologies, by John R. Loeschen. Renaissance Quarterly 35.4 (1982): 618–620.
- Review of Introduction to Systematic Theology, by Louis Berkhof. Reformed Journal32.3 (1982): 27.
- Review of Theology and Revolution in the Scottish Reformation: Studies in the Thought of John Knox, by Richard L. Greaves. Journal of the American Academy of Religion 50.3 (1982): 481.
- “Systematic Theologies: First and Last.” Review of The Evangelical Faith, vol. 3, Theology of the Spirit, by Helmut Thielicke, translated by Geoffrey W. Bromiley, and Foundations of Dogmatics, vol. 1, by Otto Weber, translated by Darrell L. Guder. Reformed Journal 32.10 (1982): 28, 30.
- “The Limits of General Revelation.” Review of General Revelation and Contemporary Issues, by Bruce A. Demarest. Reformed Journal 33.7 (1983): 30–31.
- Review of Calvin and the Anabaptist Radicals, by Willem Balke, translated by William J. Heynen. Church History 52.4 (1983): 533–534.
- Review of Reformed Thought and Scholasticism: The Arguments for the Existence of God in Dutch Theology, 1575–1650, by John Platt. Renaissance Quarterly 36.3 (1983): 438–439.
- “Defending Theology.” Review of In Defense of Theology, by Gordon H. Clark. Reformed Journal 34.10 (1984): 28–30.
- Review of Calvin’s Doctrine of the Atonement, by Robert A. Peterson. Church History 53.4 (1984): 553–554.
- Review of Eerdmans’ Handbook to Christian Belief, edited by Robin Keeley. TSF Bulletin 7.5 (1984): 22.
- Review of Here Am I! A Christian Reflection on God, by Adrio König. Westminster Theological Journal 46.1 (1984): 211–213.
- Review of Martini Buceri Opera Latina, vol. 1, by Martin Bucer, edited by Cornelis Augustijn, Pierre Fraenkel, and Marc Lienhard. Church History 53.1 (1984): 136–137.
- Review of The Puritan Moment: The Coming of Revolution in an English County, by William Hunt. Historical Magazine of the Protestant Episcopal Church 53.2 (1984): 131–132.
- Review of Schriften, vol. 1, by Philipp Jakob Spener, edited by Erich Beyreuther and Dietrich Blaufuss. The Eighteenth Century: A Current Bibliography, n.s., 6—for 1980 (1984): 578–579.
- Review of Creeds, Councils, and Christ, by Gerald Bray. TSF Bulletin 8.4 (1985): 25.
- Review of Jonathan Edwards’s Moral Thought and Its British Context, by Norman Fiering. The Eighteenth Century: A Current Bibliography, n.s., 7—for 1981 (1985): 449–450.
- Review of Justification and Sanctification, by Peter Toon. TSF Bulletin 8.3 (1985): 28.
- Review of Transformation and Convergence in the Frame of Knowledge: Explorations in the Interrelations of Scientific and Theological Enterprise, by Thomas F. Torrance. Westminster Theological Journal 47.1 (1985): 136–140.
- “Directions in the Study of Barth’s Christology.” Review of Christ in Perspective: Christological Perspectives in the Theology of Karl Barth, by John Thompson, and Karl Barth’s Christology: Its Basic Alexandrian Character, by Charles T. Waldrop. Westminster Theological Journal 48.1 (1986): 119–134.
- Review of Christian Dogmatics, edited by Carl E. Braaten and Robert W. Jenson. TSF Bulletin, 10.1 (1986): 35–36.
- Review of John Toland and the Deist Controversy: A Study in Adaptations, by Robert E. Sullivan. The Eighteenth Century: A Current Bibliography, n.s., 8—for 1982 (1986): 224–225.
- Review of Pascal: Adversary and Advocate, by Robert J. Nelson. Historical Magazine of the Protestant Episcopal Church 55.4 (1986): 343–344.
- “Heaven and Hell.” Review of Heaven and Hell: A Biblical and Theological Overview, by Peter Toon. Reformed Journal 37.4 (1987): 28–29.
- “God Only Wise.” Review of Predestination & Free Will: Four Views of Divine Sovereignty & Human Freedom, by John Feinberg, et al., edited by David Basinger and Randall Basinger. Reformed Journal 37.5 (1987): 31–34.
- Review of Arminius: A Study in the Dutch Reformation, 2nd ed., by Carl Bangs. Pneuma 9.1–2 (1987): 198–199.
- Review of The History of Christian Theology, vol. 1, The Science of Theology, by G.R. Evans, Alister E. McGrath, and Allan D. Galloway. Consensus 13.1 (1987): 114–115.
- Review of John Calvin on the Diaconate and Liturgical Almsgiving, by Elsie Anne McKee. Zeitschrift für Kirchengeschichte 98.1 (1987): 125–126.
- Review of The Living God, Systematic Theology, vol. 1, by Thomas C. Oden. Consensus 13.2 (1987): 99–100.
- Review of Reformed Theology in America: A History of Its Modern Development, edited by David F. Wells. Anglican and Episcopal History 56.2 (1987): 213–216.
- Review of The Spiritual Espousals and Other Works, by Jan van Ruusbroec, translated and introduced by James A. Wiseman. Pneuma 9.1–2 (1987): 197.
- Review of The Use of the Bible in Theology: Evangelical Options, edited by Robert K. Johnston. Theology Today 44.2 (1987): 284–285.
- “Sins of Omission.” Review of Karl Barth, a Theological Legacy, by Eberhard Jüngel, translated by Garrett E. Paul. Reformed Journal 37.10 (1987): 28, 30–31.
- “Competent but Flawed.” Review of Born Again: A Biblical and Theological Study of Regeneration, by Peter Toon. Reformed Journal 38.4 (1988): 28–29.
- “The Place and Importance of Karl Barth in the Twentieth Century: A Review Essay.” Review of How Karl Barth Changed My Mind, edited by Donald K. McKim; Karl Barth, a Theological Legacy, by Eberhard Jüngel, translated by Garrett E. Paul; Theology Beyond Christendom: Essays on the Centenary of the Birth of Karl Barth, May 10, 1886, edited by John Thompson; and The Way of Theology in Karl Barth: Essays and Comments, edited by H. Martin Rumscheidt. Westminster Theological Journal 50.1 (1988): 127–156.
- Review of The Calov Bible of J. S. Bach, by Johann Sebastian Bach, edited by Howard H. Cox. Consensus 14.1 (1988): 116–118.
- Review of The Covenant of Grace in Puritan Thought, by John von Rohr. Sixteenth Century Journal 19.3 (1988): 508–509.
- Review of The Historical Argument for the Resurrection of Jesus During the Deist Controversy, by William Lane Craig. Church History 57.3 (1988): 379–380.
- “Soteriological Christology.” Review of The Anonymous Christ: Jesus as Savior in Modern Theology, by Lee E. Snook. Reformed Journal 38.11 (1988): 30–31.
- “Once More Into the Breach.” Review of Chosen for Life: An Introductory Guide to the Doctrine of Divine Election, by C. Samuel Storms. Reformed Journal 39.1 (1989): 30–31.
- Review of The Authority of the Bible and the Rise of the Modern World, by Henning Graf Reventlow, translated by John Bowden. The Eighteenth Century: A Current Bibliography, n.s., 10—for 1984 (1989): 284–286.
- Review of De falsa et vera Unius Dei Patris, Filii et Spiritus Sancti cognitione libri duo (Albae Iuliae, 1568), introduced by Antal Pirnát. Sixteenth Century Journal 20.4 (1989): 710–711.
- Review of John Toland: His Methods, Manners, and Mind, by Stephen H. Daniel. The Eighteenth Century: A Current Bibliography, n.s., 10—for 1984 (1989): 241–243.
- Review of Ramism in William Perkins’ Theology, by Donald K. McKim. Sixteenth Century Journal 20.1 (1989): 125–126.
- Review of Renaissance Dialectic and Renaissance Piety: Benet of Canfield’s Rule of Perfection: A Translation and Study, by Benôit de Canfield, translated by Kent Emery Jr. Sixteenth Century Journal 20.1 (1989): 131.
- Review of Sacred Rhetoric: The Christian Grand Style in the English Renaissance, by Debora K. Shuger. Sixteenth Century Journal 20.4 (1989): 687–688.
- Review of Body, Soul, and Life Everlasting: Biblical Anthropology and the MonismDualism Debate, by John W. Cooper. Theology Today 47.2 (1990): 228.
- Review of Meletius, sive, De iis quae inter Christianos conveniunt epistola, by Hugo Grotius, translated by G.H.M. Posthumus Meyjes. Consensus 16.1 (1990): 121–122.
- Review of The Reformed Imperative: What the Church Has to Say that No One Else Can Say, by John H. Leith. Journal of Religion 70.4 (1990): 647.
- Review of The Emanuel Hirsch and Paul Tillich Debate: A Study in the Political Ramifications of Theology, by A. James Reimer. Consensus 18.1 (1992): 144–145.
- Review of Loci Theologici, by Martin Chemnitz, translated by J.A.O. Preus. Consensus 18.1 (1992): 136–139.
- Review of The Origins of the Federal Theology in Sixteenth-Century Reformation Thought, by David A. Weir. Journal of Religion 72.4 (1992): 597–598.
- Review of Theology of the Reformers, by Timothy George. Calvin Theological Journal 27.1 (1992): 109–111.
- Review of The Word of Life, Systematic Theology, vol. 2, by Thomas C. Oden. Consensus 18.1 (1992): 140–141.
- Review of Assurance of Faith: Calvin, English Puritanism, and the Dutch Second Reformation, by Joel R. Beeke. Sixteenth Century Journal 24.3 (1993): 745–747.
- Review of Calvin et la dynamique de la parole: Etude de rhétorique réformée, by Olivier Millet. Sixteenth Century Journal 24.3 (1993): 747–749.
- Review of Doctrine and Practice in the Early Church, by Stuart G. Hall. Calvin Theological Journal 28.2 (1993): 537–538.
- Review of Dogma and Mysticism in Early Christianity: Epiphanius of Cyprus and the Legacy of Origen, by Jon F. Dechow. Consensus 19.2 (1993): 150.
- Review of The History of the Covenant Concept from the Bible to Johannes Cloppenburg: De Foedere Dei, by David N.J. Poole. Calvin Theological Journal 28.1 (1993): 217–218.
- Review of Institutes of Elenctic Theology, vol. 1, First Through Tenth Topics, by Francis Turretin, translated by George Musgrave Giger, edited by James T. Dennison Jr. Calvin Theological Journal 28.2 (1993): 520–522.
- Review of Paganism and Christianity, 100–425 c.e.: A Sourcebook, edited by Ramsay MacMullen and Eugene N. Lane. Calvin Theological Journal 28.2 (1993): 544–545.
- Review of Regnum Caelorum: Patterns of Future Hope in Early Christianity, by Charles E. Hill. Westminster Theological Journal 55.2 (1993): 359–360.
- Review of The Religion of the Heart: A Study of European Religious Life in the Seventeenth and Eighteenth Centuries, by Ted A. Campbell. Journal of Religion 73.2 (1993): 261–262.
- Review of The Theater of His Glory: Nature and the Natural Order in the Thought of John Calvin, by Susan E. Schreiner. Calvin Theological Journal 28.1 (1993): 190–191.
- Review of The Westminster Confession of Faith: An Authentic Modern Version, by Douglas F. Kelly, Hugh McClure, and Philip Rollinson, and A Guide: The Westminster Confession of Faith: Commentary, by John H. Gerstner, Douglas F. Kelly, and Philip Rollinson. Calvin Theological Journal 28.1 (1993): 222–223.
- Review of The Word Became Flesh: A Contemporary Incarnational Christology, by Millard J. Erickson. Calvin Theological Journal 28.1 (1993): 182–184.
- “Barth’s Göttingen Dogmatics (1924–26): A Review and Assessment of Volume One.” Review of The Göttingen Dogmatics: Instruction in the Christian Religion, vol. 1, by Karl Barth, edited by Hannelotte Reiffen, translated by Geoffrey W. Bromiley. Westminster Theological Journal 56.1 (1994): 115–132.
- Review of The Apostolic Fathers, 2nd ed., translated by J.B. Lightfoot and J.R. Harmer, edited by Michael W. Holmes. Calvin Theological Journal 29.1 (1994): 311–312.
- Review of At the Origins of Modern Atheism, by Michael J. Buckley. The Eighteenth Century: A Current Bibliography, n.s., 13—for 1987 (1994): 149–151.
- Review of Biblical Interpretation Then and Now: Contemporary Hermeneutics in the Light of the Early Church, by David S. Dockery. Calvin Theological Journal 29.1 (1994): 260–261.
- Review of The Bolsec Controversy on Predestination, From 1551 to 1555, vol. 1, pts. 1–2, by Philip C. Holtrop. Calvin Theological Journal 29.2 (1994): 581–589.
- Review of Calvin’s Preaching, by T.H.L. Parker. Journal of Religion 74.3 (1994): 395–396.
- Review of Christianity 101: Your Guide to Eight Basic Christian Beliefs, by Gilbert Bilezikian. Calvin Theological Journal 29.2 (1994): 571–573.
- Review of Commentary on the Larger Catechism; Previously Titled A Body of Divinity: Wherein the Doctrines of the Christian Religion Are Explained and Defended, Being the Substance of Several Lectures on the Assembly’s Larger Catechism, by Thomas Ridgley, revised with notes by John M. Wilson. Calvin Theological Journal 29.2 (1994): 607–609.
- Review of Fountainhead of Federalism: Heinrich Bullinger and the Covenantal Tradition, by Charles S. McCoy and J. Wayne Baker, with a translation of De testamento seu foedere Dei unico et aeterno, by Heinrich Bullinger. Anglican and Episcopal History 63.1 (1994): 89–91.
- Review of Heresy and Criticism: The Search for Authenticity in Early Christian Literature, by Robert M. Grant. Calvin Theological Journal 29.1 (1994): 317–318.
- Review of Hermetica: The Greek Corpus Hermeticum and the Latin Asclepius in a New English Translation, with Notes and Introduction, translated and edited by Brian P. Copenhaver. Calvin Theological Journal 29.2 (1994): 624–625.
- Review of Institutes of Elenctic Theology, vol. 2, Eleventh Through Seventeenth Topics, by Francis Turretin, translated by George Musgrave Giger, edited by James T. Dennison Jr. Calvin Theological Journal 29.2 (1994): 614–615.
- Review of Ioannis Calvini opera exegetica, vol. 16, Commentarii in Pauli epistolas ad Galatas, ad Ephesios, ad Philippenses, ad Colossenses, by John Calvin, edited by Helmut Feld. Sixteenth Century Journal 25.2 (1994): 476–478.
- Review of Life in the Spirit, Systematic Theology, vol. 3, by Thomas C. Oden. Consensus 20.1 (1994): 133–134.
- Review of A Theology of Word and Spirit: Authority and Method in Theology, by Donald G. Bloesch. Calvin Theological Journal 29.1 (1994): 307.
- Review of What Christians Believe: A Biblical and Historical Summary, by Alan F. Johnson and Robert Webber. Calvin Theological Journal 29.2 (1994): 523–525.
- Review of Who’s Who in Theology: From the First Century to the Present, by John Bowden. Calvin Theological Journal 29.1 (1994): 308.
- Review of Calvinus Sacrae Scripturae Professor = Calvin as Confessor of Holy Scripture, edited by Wilhelm H. Neuser. Sixteenth Century Journal 26.2 (1995): 478–480.
- Review of An Exposition of Ezekiel, Geneva Series Commentary, by William Greenhill. Calvin Theological Journal 30.2 (1995): 563–565.
- Review of Ezekiel I: Chapters 1–12, Calvin’s Old Testament Commentaries, vol. 18, by John Calvin, translated by D. Foxgrover and D. Martin, and Daniel I: Chapters 1–6, Calvin’s Old Testament Commentaries, vol. 20, by John Calvin, translated by T.H.L. Parker. Sixteenth Century Journal 26.4 (1995): 1032–1033.
- Review of Grace and Gratitude: The Eucharistic Theology of John Calvin, by B.A. Gerrish. Journal of Religion 75.1 (1995): 119–121.
- Review of Mozart: Traces of Transcendence, by Hans Küng, translated by John Bowden. Consensus 21.2 (1995): 129–130.
- Review of Peter Martyr Vermigli, 1499–1562: Renaissance Man, Reformation Master, by Mariano Di Gangi. Calvin Theological Journal 30.1 (1995): 308–309.
- Review of Prophecy in Carthage: Perpetua, Tertullian, and Cyprian, by Cecil M. Robeck Jr. Calvin Theological Journal 30.2 (1995): 499–501.
- Review of Biblical Interpretation in the Early Church: An Historical Introduction to Patristic Exegesis, by Manlio Simonetti. Calvin Theological Journal 31.1 (1996): 310–311.
- Review of Calvin and the Rhetoric of Piety, by Serene Jones. Calvin Theological Journal 31.2 (1996): 582–583.
- Review of Calvin: An Introduction to His Thought, by T.H.L. Parker. Calvin Theological Journal 31.2 (1996): 590–591.
- Review of The Early Church: An Annotated Bibliography of Literature in English, by Thomas A. Robinson. Calvin Theological Journal 31.2 (1996): 623.
- Review of The Emergence of Christian Theology, by Eric Osborn. Calvin Theological Journal 31.2 (1996): 622–623.
- Review of Jesus Christ and Creation in the Theology of John Calvin, by Peter Wyatt. Calvin Theological Journal 31.2 (1996): 618–620.
- Review of Jesus Christ in the Preaching of Calvin and Schleiermacher, by Dawn DeVries. Calvin Theological Journal 31.2 (1996): 603–607.
- Review of The Knowledge of God in Calvin’s Theology, expanded ed., by Edward A. Dowey Jr. Lutheran Quarterly, n.s., 10.2 (1996): 201–202.
- Review of Peter Lombard, by Marcia L. Colish. Calvin Theological Journal 31.2 (1996): 547–548.
- Review of The Presence of God: A History of Western Christian Mysticism, vol. 1, The Foundations of Mysticism, by Bernard McGinn. Calvin Theological Journal 31.1 (1996): 212–213.
- Review of A Scripture Index to the Works of St. Augustine in English Translation, by James W. Wiles. Calvin Theological Journal 31.1 (1996): 301–302.
- Review of Anticlericalism in Late Medieval and Early Modern Europe, by Peter A. Dykema and Heiko A. Oberman. Zwingliana 24 (1997): 153–155.
- Review of Christian Doctrine, revised ed., by Shirley C. Guthrie. Consensus 23.1 (1997): 83–84.
- Review of Correspondance de Théodore de Bèze, vol. 17, 1576, and vol. 18, 1577, collected by Hippolyte Aubert, edited by Alain Dufour, Béatrice Nicollier, and Reinhard Bodenmann. Church History 66.1 (1997): 116–117.
- Review of De doctrina christiana: A Classic of Western Culture, edited by Duane W.H. Arnold, and Reading and Wisdom: The De doctrina christiana of Augustine in the Middle Ages, edited by Edward D. English. Calvin Theological Journal 32.1 (1997): 214.
- Review of A Hot Pepper Corn: Richard Baxter’s Doctrine of Justification in Its 17thCentury Context of Controversy, by Hans Boersma. Calvin Theological Journal 32.1 (1997): 175–176.
- Review of Sermons on Galatians, by John Calvin, foreword by W. Robert Godfrey; Sermons on Election & Reprobation, by John Calvin, foreword by David C. Engelsma; and Sermons on Psalm 119, by John Calvin, foreword by James M. Boice. Calvin Theological Journal 32.1 (1997): 153–157.
- Review of Systematic Theology: Biblical, Historical, and Evangelical, vol. 2, by James Leo Garrett Jr. Consensus 23.1 (1997): 84–85.
- Review of The Claims of Truth: John Owen’s Trinitarian Theology, by Carl R. Trueman. Calvin Theological Journal 33.2 (1998): 522–524.
- Review of A Commentary on the Old and New Testaments, by John Trapp. Calvin Theological Journal 33.2 (1998): 484–485.
- Review of History of Theology, vol. 1, The Patristic Period, edited by Angelo Di Berardino and Basil Studer. Calvin Theological Journal 33.2 (1998): 565–566.
- Review of Humanists and Reformers: A History of the Renaissance and Reformation, by Bard Thompson. Journal of Religion 78.1 (1998): 118–119.
- Review of Institutes of Elenctic Theology, vol. 3, Eighteenth Through Twentieth Topics, by Francis Turretin, translated by George Musgrave Giger, edited by James T. Dennison Jr. Calvin Theological Journal 33.2 (1998): 525–526.
- Review of Luther’s Heirs Define His Legacy: Studies in Lutheran Confessionalization, by Robert Kolb. Calvin Theological Journal 33.2 (1998): 567–568.
- Review of The Reception of the Church Fathers in the West: From the Carolingians to the Maurists, edited by Irena Backus. Calvin Theological Journal 33.2 (1998): 487–488.
- Review of Registres du Consistoire de Genève au temps de Calvin, vol. 1, 1542–1544, edited by Robert M. Kingdon, Thomas A. Lambert, Isabella M. Watt, and Jeffrey R. Watt. Calvin Theological Journal 33.2 (1998): 512–513.
- Review of Sermons on Galatians, by John Calvin, translated by Kathy Childress, and The Deity of Christ and Other Sermons, by John Calvin, translated by Leroy Nixon. Calvin Theological Journal 33.2 (1998): 483–484.
- Review of The Theology of John Calvin, by Karl Barth, translated by Geoffrey W. Bromiley. Lutheran Quarterly, n.s., 12.2 (1998): 226–228.
- Review of The Westminster Standards: An Original Facsimile, foreword by William S. Barker. Calvin Theological Journal 33.2 (1998): 489–490.
- Review of The Federal Theology of Thomas Boston, by A.T.B. McGowan. Calvin Theological Journal 35.1 (2000): 175.
- Review of A History of the Synoptic Problem: The Canon, the Text, the Composition, and the Interpretation of the Gospels, by David Laird Dungan. Calvin Theological Journal 35.1 (2000): 163.
- Review of Jean Gerson: Early Works, translated by Brian Patrick McGuire. Calvin Theological Journal 35.1 (2000): 176.
- Review of Luther and German Humanism, by Lewis W. Spitz, and The Reformation: Education and History, by Lewis W. Spitz. Calvin Theological Journal 35.2 (2000): 363–364.
- Review of Renaissance Transformations of Late Medieval Thought, by Charles Trinkaus. Calvin Theological Journal 35.2 (2000): 364–365.
- Review of Richard Sibbes: Puritanism and Calvinism in Late Elizabethan and Early Stuart England, by Mark E. Dever. Calvin Theological Journal 35.2 (2000): 344–345.
- Review of Rijker dan Midas: Vrijheid, genade en predestinatie in de theologie van Jacobus Arminius (1559–1609), by Eef Dekker. Calvin Theological Journal 35.2 (2000): 343–344.
- Review of Thomas Aquinas, Theologian, by Thomas F. O’Meara. Calvin Theological Journal 35.1 (2000): 176.
- Review of Alsted and Leibniz: On God, the Magistrate, and the Millennium, edited by Maria Rosa Antognazza and Howard Hotson. Calvin Theological Journal 36.2 (2001): 389–390.
- Review of A Commentary on Revelation, by James Durham, introduction by David C. Lachman. Calvin Theological Journal 36.2 (2001): 383–384.
- Review of Ioannis Calvini scripta ecclesiastica, vol. 1, De aeterna Dei praedestinatione / De la predestination eternelle, by John Calvin, edited by Wilhelm H. Neuser and Olivier Fatio. Calvin Theological Journal 36.2 (2001): 390–391.
- Review of Johann Heinrich Alsted, 1588–1638: Between Renaissance, Reformation, and Universal Reform, by Howard Hotson. Calvin Theological Journal 36.2 (2001): 399–400.
- Review of The Legacy of John Calvin: Papers Presented at the Twelfth Colloquium of the Calvin Studies Society, edited by David Foxgrover. Calvin Theological Journal 36.2 (2001): 395.
- “The Starting Point of Calvin’s Theology: An Essay-Review.” Review of The Starting Point of Calvin’s Theology, by George H. Tavard. Calvin Theological Journal 36.2 (2001): 314–341.
- Review of The Collected Writings of John Gill [CD-ROM], by John Gill. Calvin Theological Journal 38.2 (2003): 380–381.
- Review of The Federal Theology of Johannes Cocceius (1603–1669), by Willem J. van Asselt, translated by Raymond A. Blacketer. Nederlands Theologisch Tijdschrift 57.2 (2003): 164–165.
- Review of “God Calls Us to His Service”: The Relation Between God and His Audience in Calvin’s Sermons on Acts, by Wilhelmus H.Th. Moehn. Calvin Theological Journal 38.2 (2003): 396–397.
- Review of The Systematic Theology of John Brown of Haddington, by John Brown, introduction by Joel R. Beeke and Randall J. Pederson. Calvin Theological Journal 38.2 (2003): 362–364.
- Review of Commonplace Learning: Ramism and Its German Ramifications 1543–1630, by Howard Hotson. Renaissance Quarterly 61.1 (2008): 241–242.
- Review of English Hypothetical Universalism: John Preston and the Softening of Reformed Theology, by Jonathan D. Moore. Calvin Theological Journal 43.1 (2008): 149–150.
- Review of From Judaism to Calvinism: The Life and Writings of Immanuel Tremellius (c. 1510–1580), by Kenneth Austin. Religious Studies Review 35.4 (2009): 292.
- Review of The Restoration of Christianity: An English Translation of the Christianismi restitutio, 1553, by Michael Servetus, translated by Christopher A. Hoffman and Marian Hillar, notes by Marian Hillar. Catholic Historical Review 95.2 (2009): 387–388.
- Review of Trinitarian Spirituality: John Owen and the Doctrine of God in Western Devotion, by Brian Kay. Journal of Ecclesiastical History 60.2 (2009): 395–396.
- Review of Lutheran Ecclesiastical Culture, 1550–1675, edited by Robert Kolb. Lutheran Quarterly, n.s., 24.3 (2010): 343–346.

=== Bibliographies ===
- Stanglin, Keith D., and Richard A. Muller. “Bibliographia Arminiana: A Comprehensive, Annotated Bibliography of the Works of Arminius.” In Arminius, Arminianism, and Europe: Jacob Arminius (1559/60–1609), edited by Th. Marius van Leeuwen, Keith D. Stanglin, and Marijke Tolsma, 263–290. Leiden: Brill, 2009.

=== Other works ===
- Editor. Religion: Serials, Periodicals, and Multi-Volume Sets. Leiden: IDC, 1990. Microfiche.
- Series general editor. Texts and Studies in Reformation and Post-Reformation Thought. Grand Rapids: Baker Academic, 1999-.
- Collaborator. “Report of the Committee to Study the Materials from the Reformed Churches of Australia re: Christ’s Descent into Hell.” In Agenda for Synod, June 10–17, 2000, by the Christian Reformed Church in North America, 212–228. Grand Rapids: Board of Publications of the Christian Reformed Church, 2000.
- Advisor. The Reformation in Heidelberg, edited by Charles Gunnoe. Leiden: IDC, 2003. Microfiche.
- Advisor. The Reformation in Heidelberg II, edited by Charles Gunnoe. Leiden: IDC, 2010. Microfiche.
- Series collaborative editor. Reformed Historical Theology, vols. 8, 9, 13–20, edited by Herman J. Selderhuis. Göttingen: V&R, 2010-.
