= Split of 1924 =

Schism between Reformed churches

The Split of 1924 was a turning point in the history of the Christian Reformed Church (CRC) and the Protestant Reformed Churches of America (PRCA). The controversy began with the Janssen case involving Ralph Janssen, a professor at Calvin Theological Seminary, who used the doctrine of common grace to support his views on scriptural inspiration. Although common grace was not the focus of the case, it underpinned Janssen's teachings.

Herman Hoeksema, a young minister, followed the case and identified common grace as its core issue. When the Christian Reformed Synod of 1922 did not reject common grace, Hoeksema anticipated its resurgence. Despite being in the minority, he and Rev. Henry Danhof became prominent figures in the ensuing pamphlet debate.

The controversy intensified, culminating in the Synod of 1924. The synod did not address the protesting ministers, but Hoeksema was expelled from the church by March 1925. Although the split is known as the Split of 1924, there was no precise moment when the Protestant Reformed Churches of America separated from the Christian Reformed Church.

== Janssen case ==
Common grace in the Christian Reformed Churches dates back to the Janssen case. Ralph Janssen, a professor of Old Testament theology at Calvin Seminary, began using the concept of common grace to support his views on scriptural inspiration. Four seminary professors expressed concern and brought the matter to the board of trustees. The board instructed the professors to address their concerns with Janssen. Unsatisfied with this response, the professors appealed to the Synod of 1920.

At the synod, the professors presented their grounds for an investigation and Janssen was given an opportunity to defend his teachings. The synod decided that there was insufficient evidence to warrant an investigation of Janssen's views. Herman Hoeksema, a young minister and former student of Janssen's, had been following the case. Although he disagreed with the professors' approach, he was also critical of the synod's decision. Hoeksema began his own investigation, speaking with students and collecting their notes. In the spring of 1921, he was appointed to a committee tasked with investigating the issue. The committee was divided, and produced separate reports.

The central issues of the Janssen case were not directly related to common grace, but focused on the "infallibility of Scripture, higher criticism, and a liberal view of doctrine and life". Hoeksema and Henry Danhof, another committee member, identified common grace as a key underlying issue and opposed Janssen's teachings. The four professors critical of Janssen did not share this perspective on common grace, leading Hoeksema to say that their stance was inconsistent. Janssen and Hoeksema agreed that if common grace was accepted, Janssen's logical and consistent approach should be also. The Synod of 1922 ruled against Janssen's teachings, but did not reject common grace.

== Pamphlet war ==
Supporters of Janssen soon turned against Hoeksema due to his involvement in the case against Janssen. Hoeksema and Henry Danhof were a minority in the Christian Reformed Church; this led to a pamphlet war, primarily between Danhof and Hoeksema and Jan Karel Van Baalen of Munster, Indiana. The conflict spawned articles in periodicals, a number of pamphlets, and vigorous debate. Hoeksema and Danhof published Van Zonde en Genade (Of Sin and Grace), a pamphlet which was frequently used against them.

== Trouble at the Eastern Avenue CRC ==
On January 19, 1924, three members of the Eastern Avenue congregation (Hoeksema's church) visited his home to protest against some of his views. As Hoeksema began reading the letter he realized that it was intended for the consistory rather than for him personally, and informed the men that they should address their concerns to the consistory instead.

The men brought their protest to the consistory of the Eastern Avenue CRC, framing it as a matter of public sin. The consistory acknowledged that the issue was public, but disagreed that it constituted sin and the three men were placed under discipline.

The next protest came from J. VanderMey, a minister without a congregation. The Eastern Avenue consistory instructed him to address his concerns with Hoeksema directly before escalating the matter. VanderMey made the issue public instead, submitting his protest to the May meeting of Classis Grand Rapids East and being placed under discipline for "making secret and false propaganda against his pastor".

== More protests ==
Two additional protests were filed: one by Van Baalen and another, in overture form, from M. Schans of Kellogsville. Van Baalen submitted his protest to Classis Grand Rapids West, targeting Danhof. Van Baalen was not a member of either classis, and had not approached the consistory or the minister beforehand. Schans also bypassed the consistory and the minister by publishing his overture without the approval of his consistory.

== Classis Grand Rapids East 1924 ==
Classis Grand Rapids East convened a contentious three-day meeting on May 21, 1924, at the Eastern Avenue CRC. The classis declared all four protests valid, prompting Hoeksema and Elder O. Van Ellen (a member of Eastern Avenue's consistory) to walk out in protest. In response, the classis decided to relocate its meeting to the Sherman Street CRC for further discussion.

After extensive deliberation, the classis concluded that it had never formally agreed to address the protests and requested Hoeksema's return. Following additional discussion, it determined that the protests were invalid and sent them back to the Eastern Avenue CRC consistory. The classis also decided that the three who had accused Hoeksema of public sin should be removed from church discipline. Hoeksema rejected this resolution, saying that "further conflict between the classis and the consistory was inevitable".

== Classis Grand Rapids West 1924 ==
Van Baalen's protest against Danhof, submitted to Classis Grand Rapids West, was handled differently; he was instructed to first discuss the matter privately with Danhof. If the issue was not resolved through private discussion, Van Baalen was required to bring the matter before the Kalamazoo First CRC consistory. If the issue remained unresolved, he could call a June 10, 1924, special meeting of Classis Grand Rapids West. The decision by the classis was unusual; the special meeting was scheduled only eight days before the synod, and Van Baalen (who was not a member of Classis Grand Rapids West) was given the authority to call the meeting.

== Synod of 1924 ==
The Synod of 1924 convened on June 18, 1924. The issue of common grace was addressed during the eighteenth session of the synod, on July 1. At this session, the advisory committee presented a twenty four page report. The committee's advice defended Hoeksema, Danhof, and the doctrine of common grace. Criticism of Hoeksema and Danhof as one-sided was invalid; similar expressions had been used by supralapsarians without church discipline, and Hoeksema and Danhof did not say that God is the author of sin.

The committee advised that Hoeksema's one-sided emphasis on God's counsel could not be judged harshly. It found no grounds for criticizing Hoeksema's preaching, noting a lack of sufficient evidence, no complaints from the consistory, and his teachings were consistent with what had previously been preached in Reformed churches. The committee recommended that the synod make a formal declaration on the three points of common grace due to the ongoing strife within the church over the doctrine, discussing a variety of theological viewpoints and examining relevant scriptural passages. Although the synod should address the three points, no definitive conclusion could be reached at that time. It suggested that the issue be studied further by a broad group of ministers and professors rather than being dogmatically resolved by a committee; the issue should evolve over time through extensive discussion.

The synod's proceedings were somewhat disorganized. Hoeksema was denied an opportunity to speak for several days before pleading for a chance to address the synod. He spoke for two hours in an attempt to persuade some and provoke thought by others. His arguments led some ministers, including Manni, to question common grace and suggest deferring a decision until the next synod, after further study. Despite these efforts, the synod formulated the three points of common grace. Although the points were established, neither Hoeksema nor Danhof faced disciplinary action or were required to subscribe to the doctrines. According to Hoeksema, the advisory committee had initially recommended disciplining the two ministers. If the recommendation was removed, the synod chose not to take disciplinary measures against them.

== Formation of the Protestant Reformed Churches ==
Since Hoeksema had not been disciplined by the synod, the consistory asked the censured members withdraw their protest against him. When this was denied, the consistory appealed to Classis Grand Rapids East to reverse its decision to lift the discipline from the three members. After discussing the matter in August meetings, Classis refused to change its decision. In response, the consistory convened a congregational meeting on September 2, 1924, to provide information about the situation and allow the congregation to protest Classis's decision. The congregation was divided on the issue.

Classis Grand Rapids East reconvened from November 19 to December 12, but neither side was willing to compromise. Classis insisted that Hoeksema and his consistory "subscribe to the Three Points and promise to abide by them". Hoeksema refused, and it became clear that Classis intended to depose him and his consistory for their refusal. The church was again in turmoil, with Hoeksema and most of the congregation (all but ninety-two members) continuing to worship at the same place.

In January 1925, the courts ruled that the majority of the congregation would "remain in possession of the property" until the conflict was resolved. Hoeksema, Danhof, George Martin Ophoff, and their consistories signed an agreement forming a new denomination: the Protesting Christian Reformed Churches. A number of court cases were filed during the next few months, culminating in a Michigan Supreme Court decision awarding the Eastern Avenue church property to the ninety-two members who had remained loyal to the Christian Reformed Church. Before this final ruling, however, Hoeksema was expelled from the church in March 1925.
