= Herman Bavinck =

Dutch Calvinist philosopher and theologian (1854–1921)

The Reverend Herman Bavinck
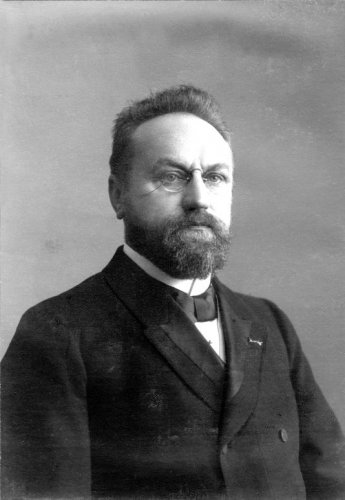
- Bavinck, c. 1913
- Born: 13 December 1854; Hoogeveen, Netherlands
- Died: 29 July 1921 (aged 66); Amsterdam, Netherlands
- Political party: Anti-Revolutionary Party
- Spouse: Johanna A. Schippers (m. 1891)

Ecclesiastical career
- Religion: Christian (Continental Reformed)
- Church: Christian Reformed Church; Reformed Churches in the Netherlands
- Ordained: c. 1881

Academic background
- Education: Kampen Theological Seminary; Leiden University
- Thesis: A Succinct Demonstration of the Influence of Schleiermacher upon the Exposition of Holy Scripture
- Doctoral advisor: Jan Hendrik Scholten
- Influences: Thomas Aquinas; Augustine of Hippo; Abraham Kuyper; Friedrich Wilhelm Nietzsche; Friedrich Schleiermacher; John Calvin

Academic work
- Discipline: Theology
- Sub-discipline: Dogmatic theology
- School or tradition: Neo-Calvinism
- Institutions: Kampen Theological Seminary; Vrije Universiteit Amsterdam
- Notable works: Reformed Dogmatics (1895–1901)
- Influenced: Louis Berkhof; John Bolt; Herman Hoeksema; Tim Keller; Abraham Kuyper; Hendrik G. Stoker; Cornelius Van Til; D. H. Th. Vollenhoven

Herman Bavinck (13 December 1854 – 29 July 1921) was a Dutch Calvinist philosopher, theologian and churchman. He was a significant scholar in the Calvinist tradition, alongside Abraham Kuyper, B. B. Warfield, and Geerhardus Vos.

== Biography ==
=== Background ===
Bavinck was born on 13 December 1854 in the town of Hoogeveen in the Netherlands to a German father, Jan Bavinck (1826–1909), who was the minister of theologically conservative, ecclesiastically separatist Christian Reformed Church (Christelijke Gereformeerde Kerk); his nephew Johan Herman Bavinck was a missionary to Indonesia.

After his high school education, Bavinck first went to the Theological School in Kampen in 1873, but then moved on to Leiden for further training after one year in Kampen. He wrote in his student journal notes that he was motivated to transfer his studies by the preaching of the pastor Johannes Hendricus Donner, who was also ministering in Leiden by that time. He studied under prominent faculties such as Johannes Scholten and Abraham Kuenen, and finally graduated in 1880 from the University of Leiden having completed a dissertation on the ethics of Ulrich Zwingli.

A year later, Bavinck was appointed Professor of Dogmatics at Theological School in Kampen. While serving there, he also assisted his denomination that had formed out of the withdrawal of orthodox Calvinists earlier from the state Hervormde Kerk, a withdrawal movement called the "Afscheiding" (Secession) in its merger with a second and subsequent larger breakaway movement that also left the Hervormde Kerk, this time under the leadership of Abraham Kuyper, a movement called the "Doleantie" (the Complaint: a historical reference to the term used by orthodox Reformed ministers who opposed Arminianism prior to the National Synod of Dordt, 1618–19).

The now-united Church combined the "Afgescheidenen" and "Dolerenden" into the Gereformeerde Kerken in Nederland (GKiN). As a result of the merger, GKiN inherited the denominational seminary of the Afscheiding churches and that seminary became the denominational seminary of the GKiN, where Bavinck stayed put, so as to ease the transition of his colleagues and people within the much larger new Church. Already, when the Afgescheidenen merged with the Dolerenden, there was a minority of the Seceders who stayed out of the union; they formed their new denomination as the Christelijke Gereformeerde Kerken (CGK), and they established their own theological seminary in the town of Apeldoorn.

=== Move to Amsterdam ===
Amidst all these developments, Bavinck stayed put and pursued his class lectures, research, writing, and publication – making his distinctive mark as an orthodox Calvinist theologian and churchman.

The recently founded Free University in Amsterdam (VU), under the leadership of Abraham Kuyper, was meant to be a bastion of Reformed learning in all fields of thought. The Free University including its Theology Faculty for training clergy, unlike Kampen Seminary, was independent of both the state and all church denominations. But, of course, theology was the VU's initial leading concern for some decades. So, Bavinck, when he was first invited to join the VU Faculty, had to weigh the merits of teaching what concerned him in his theological research, in such a seemingly independent environment. With Kuyper in the same faculty, he might have come to feel quite crowded.

After refusing the invitation of Abraham Kuyper several times to come to Amsterdam, finally Bavinck accepted Kuyper's plea. In 1902 he succeeded Kuyper as Professor of Theology at the Free University in Amsterdam. Kuyper himself had developed other workloads, and simply wanted the best man available to replace himself. Thus, Bavinck moved to the big city, with his first edition of multi-volume Gereformeerde Dogmatiek already in publication. He arrived well-credentialed and well-respected. He remained at VU for the remainder of his teaching career. In 1906 he became a member of the Royal Netherlands Academy of Arts and Sciences. In 1911, he was named to the Senate of the Netherlands Parliament. He assisted in the encouragement of the Gereformeerde people to build their own Christian schools, without state financial help, until such a time as the 80-years "School War" was brought to an end by the granting of government assistance to all schools.

In 1908 he visited the United States and gave the Stone Lectures at Princeton Theological Seminary.

Bavinck died on 29 July 1921 in Amsterdam.

=== Bavinck and Kuyper ===
Bavinck has been compared with his contemporary Abraham Kuyper. J. H. Landwehr, Bavinck's first biographer, had this to say of the two:

Bavinck was an Aristotelian, Kuyper had a Platonic spirit. Bavinck was the man of clear concept, Kuyper the man of the fecund idea. Bavinck worked with the historically given; Kuyper proceeded speculatively by way of intuition. Bavinck's was primarily an inductive mind; Kuyper's primarily deductive.

One major difference in ideas between Bavinck and Kuyper is formulated largely in theological terms contrasting a doctrine called "Common Grace" with a doctrine called "the Antithesis". Bavinck emphasized Common Grace, while Kuyper emphasized (sometimes severely) the Antithesis. A comparison of the two positions, which came to designate two interwoven and contentious traditions in the GKiN and the neo-Calvinist Christian social movements that flowed from its membership, is presented in Jacob Klapwijk's important work of Reformational philosophy, entitled Bringing into Captivity Every Thought (English, 1986).

== Theology ==
Much work has been done considering the methods, principles, and characteristics of Bavinck's dogmatic theology. Jan Veenhof had earlier considered a "two Bavinck" hypothesis, the Bavinck of nineteenth century philosophy versus the Reformed dogmatician, arguing partly from Bavinck's adoption of an organic motif in his thinking. The hypothesis was later challenged by James Eglinton, who posited that organicism was, for Bavinck, a theological category of unity-in-diversity rooted primarily in the Trinity, Eglinton writing that, for Bavinck, “Trinity ad intra leads to organism ad extra.” Subsequently, this has been challenged by Bruce Pass, who has attempted to restate Veenhof's diagnosis and assert an origin to Bavinck's organicism in German idealism and F.W.J. Schelling. Regardless, organicism functions as an important conceptual device for Bavinck, and is seen in other theologians from the period, e.g. Norwegian theologian Gisle Johnson. Other works have attempted to locate the center of Bavinck's thought in a grace-restores-nature structure: “...the essence of the Christian religion consists in the reality that the creation of the Father, ruined by sin, is restored in the death of the Son of God and the re-created by the grace of the Holy Spirit into a kingdom of God.” Fundamentally, Bavinck's concern was to overcome philosophical dualisms by an assertion of a worldview distinctly Trinitarian, Reformed, and organic, and the fact of his life-long confessional standing as a minister within the Dutch Christian Reformed Church should not be overlooked.

=== Principles of dogmatics ===
Bavinck's dogmatic corpus is structured around classical theological conversations concerning the principles of systematic theology. Bavinck holds dogmatic theology to be a scientific exercise based on foundations of thought and reality. From these primary assumptions and principles method necessarily follows. For Bavinck, there are three fundamental principles in theology as a science: 1. God and the Trinity is the essential foundation (principium essendi) of dogmatics; 2. Scripture is the external cognitive principle (principium cognoscendi externum); and 3. the Holy Spirit is the internal cognitive principle (principium cognoscendi internum).

=== Doctrine of revelation ===
A dogmatic theologian, Bavinck was concerned with reordering categories of human thought in relation to God as first principle. This means that, for Bavinck, the broadest epistemological category is revelation. In other words, for Bavinck, everything is revelatory of God - including the faculties of the subjective self - and thus must assume God as its primary referent: "Revelation, while having its center (middelppunt) in the Person of Christ, in its periphery extends to the uttermost ends of creation ... The world itself rests on revelation; revelation is the presupposition, the foundation (grondslag), the secret (geheim) of all that exists in all its forms." Bavinck considers this an organic view of revelation, integrative of the individual subject in relation to creation in relation to God, a grand unity-in-diversity that integrates ontology and epistemology.

=== Theology proper & knowability ===
Bavinck was part of the movement known as Neo-Calvinism, and thus held to high views of theology proper and divine sovereignty as extending from the Calvinist tradition. For Bavinck, God as Creator implies a categorical distinction with the creation (i.e. 'the Categorical Distinction' or 'infinite qualitative distinction'): "The distinction between God and us is the gulf between the Infinite and the finite, between eternity and time, between being and becoming, between the All and the nothing. However little we know of God, the faintest notion implies that he is a being who is infinitely exalted above every creature." As such, his initial category for considering the nature of God is that of incomprehensibility and mystery: "Mystery is the lifeblood of dogmatics." Thus does not mean that God is unknowable, but simply that he is not exhaustively knowable mediately and through created forms:

...[H]uman beings have an ineradicable sense of that existence and a certain knowledge of God's being. This knowledge does not arise from their own investigation and reflection, but is due to the fact that God on his part revealed himself to us in nature and history, in prophecy and miracle, by ordinary and by extraordinary means. In Scripture, therefore, the knowability of God is never in doubt even for a moment. The fool may say in his heart, "There is no God," but those who open their eyes perceive from all directions the witness of his existence, of his eternal power and deity (Isa. 40:26; Acts 14:17; Rom. 1:19-20). The purpose of God's revelation, according to Scripture, is precisely that human beings may know God and so receive eternal life (John 17:3; 20:31).

In other words, for Bavinck, the idea of God's essence is thus tied to finite reality as revealing him, a nexus of ontology and epistemology.

Bavinck sees proofs for God's existence as unnecessarily limiting of the divine being and revelation, reversing the fundamental assumption of knowing: "The proofs, as proofs, are not the grounds but rather the products of faith." Echoing Calvin, he writes, "to the believer all things speak of God; the whole universe is the mirror of his perfections. There is not an atom of the universe in which his everlasting power and deity are not clearly seen." Again echoing Calvin, Bavinck adopts language of accommodation to explain how God reveals himself to humanity, expanding the idea of accommodation to consider that all of creation, having been created to mirror God, is thus an anthropomorphism, including human speech about the divine: "…God, not the creature, is primary. He is the archetype; the creature is the ectype … God, therefore, is not really named after things present in creatures, but creatures are named after that which exists in an absolute sense in God.” Bavinck believes that human language was designed by God and for theological expression ("...it is a human language in which God speaks to us of himself. For that reason the words he employs are human words..."; "Scripture ... is anthropomorphic through and through..."), bearing a unique relationship to Christ as Word and Word incarnate ("We have the right to use anthropomorphic language because God himself came down to the level of his creatures and revealed his name in and through his creatures"). As such he holds to a complex view of the relationship between language and God, seeing it as both epistemologically analogical yet ontologically univocal via causation: theological language and concepts are "ectypal or analogical," yet "All our knowledge is from and through God ... The possibility of his condescension cannot be denied since it is given with creation..."

Considering this view of the divine nature, Bavinck holds to classical high theological concepts surrounding the essence and attributes, holding to divine simplicity: "...God is 'simple,' that is, sublimely free from all composition, and that therefore one cannot make any real distinction between his being and his attributes. Each attribute is identical with God's being: he is what he possesses." Bavinck will also discuss God's independence, immutability, infinity, and unity as interrelated concepts.

=== The Trinity ===
The entire Reformed Dogmatics is structured on the Trinitarian formula of Father, Son, and Holy Spirit, with the exception of volume 1 as a prolegomena. Bavinck held that the Trinity was the essential principle of theology and structures his worldview according to the unity-in-diversity of the Trinity: "The Trinity reveals God to us as the fullness of being, the true life, eternal beauty. In God, too, there is unity in diversity, diversity in unity. Indeed, this order and harmony is present in him absolutely. In the case of creatures we see only a faint analogy of it." For Bavinck, the predication of personhood onto the divine essence obtains uniquely in God via the analogy of being, and he warns against wrongly-ordered concepts of personhood in relation to deity:

Human nature as it exists in different people is never totally and quantitatively the same. For that reason people are not only distinct but also separate. In God all this is different. The divine nature cannot be conceived as an abstract generic concept nor does it exist as a substance outside of, above, and behind the divine persons. It exists in the divine persons and is totally and quantitatively the same in each person ... The glory of the confession of the Trinity consists above all in the fact that that unity, however, absolute, does not exclude but includes diversity. God's being is not an abstract unity or concept, but a fullness of being, an infinite abundance of life, whose diversity, so far from diminishing the unity, unfolds to its fullest extent.

In other words, importantly for Bavinck, God is personal: "...The persons are not three revelational modes of the one divine personality; the divine being is tripersonal, precisely because it is the absolute divine personality."

=== Theological anthropology ===
Bavinck held that humanity profoundly reflects God, believing that humanity not only contains God's image, but personally and uniquely is God's image:

The essence of human nature is its being the image of God. The entire world is a revelation of God, a mirror of his attributes and perfections. Every creature in its own way and degree is the embodiment of a divine thought. But among creatures, only man is the image of God, God's highest and richest self-revelation and consequently the head and crown of the whole creation, the imago Dei and the epitome of nature, both mikrotheos (microgod) and mikrokosmos (microcosm).

As such, Bavinck holds to what could be considered a maximalist or holistic definition of what constitutes the image of God in humanity, "the idea that a human being does not bear or have the image of God but that he or she is the image of God," where "God himself, the entire deity, is the archetype of man." Bavinck holds that this image of God extends into five capacities: 1. the human soul, 2. the human heart (that is, in an affective and psychological sense), 3. human morality and holiness, i.e. original righteousness, 4. the human body, and 5. humanity's social completion as a race in future blessedness. Bavinck thus fuses substantive concepts traditionally ascribed to image of God theology in the Reformed tradition with social and progressive concepts of anthropology bound up in his organic motif, devoting a separate section to the topic of "Human Destiny":

The image of God is much too rich for it to be fully realized in a single human being, however richly gifted that human being may be. It can only be somewhat unfolded in its depth and riches in a humanity counting billions of members ... Only humanity in its entirety—as one complete organism, summed up under a single head, spread out over the whole earth, as prophet proclaiming the truth of God, as priest dedicating itself to God, as ruler controlling the earth and the whole of creation—only it is the fully finished image, the most telling and striking likeness of God.

== Publications ==
This section only includes Bavinck's writings which are available in English (alphabetical order).

- The Certainty of Faith. Translated by Harry der Nederlanden. St. Catharines, Ontario, Canada: Paideia Press, 1980. (Original: 1901; English version translated from the third edition of 1918).
- Christian Worldview. Translated and edited by Nathaniel Gray Sutanto, James Eglinton, and Cory C. Brock. Wheaton: Crossway, 2019. (Original: 1904; English version translated from the second edition).
- Essays on Religion, Science, and Society. Translated by Harry Boonstra, Gerrit Sheeres. Edited by John Bolt. Grand Rapids: Baker Academic, 2008.
- Guidebook for Instruction in the Christian Religion. Translated by Gregory Parker Jr. and Cameron Clausing. Peabody: Hendrickson, 2022.
- Herman Bavinck on Preaching & Preachers. Translated and edited by James P. Eglinton. Peabody: Hendrickson, 2017.
- In the Beginning: Foundations of Creation Theology. Edited by John Bolt. Translated by John Vriend. Grand Rapids: Baker, 1999.
- Our Reasonable Faith. Translated by Henry Zylstra. Grand Rapids: Eerdmans, 1956. (Original: 1909)
  - Updated version: The Wonderful Works of God: Instruction in the Christian Religion according to the Reformed Confession. Translated by Henry Zylstra and Nathaniel Gray Sutanto (Foreword). Glenside: Westminster Seminary Press, 2019.
- Reformed Dogmatics. Edited by John Bolt. Translated by John Vriend. 4 vols. Grand Rapids: Baker, 2003-2008. (Original: Gereformeerde Dogmatiek, 1895–1901)
  - Vol. 1 Prolegomena
  - Vol. 2 God and Creation
  - Vol. 3 Sin and Salvation
  - Vol. 4 Holy Spirit, Church, and New Creation
- Reformed Dogmatics: Abridged in One Volume. Edited by John Bolt. Grand Rapids: Baker Academic, 2011.
- Reformed Ethics. Edited by John Bolt. 3 vols. Grand Rapids: Baker Academic, 2019-ongoing.
  - Vol. 1 Created, Fallen, and Converted Humanity
  - Vol. 2 The Duties of the Christian Life
  - Vol. 3 Christian Life in Society
- Saved By Grace: The Holy Spirit's Work in Calling and Regeneration. Translated by Nelson D. Kloosterman. Edited by J. Mark Beach. Grand Rapids: Reformation Heritage Books, 2013.
- The Doctrine of God. Translated and edited by William Hendriksen. Edinburgh: Banner of Truth, 1977.
- The Christian Family. Translated by Nelson D. Kloosterman. Grand Rapids: Christian's Library Press, 2012. (Original: 1908)
- The Last Things: Hope for This World and the Next. Edited by John Bolt. Translated by John Vriend. Grand Rapids: Baker, 1996.
- The Philosophy of Revelation: The Stone Lectures for 1908–1909, Princeton Theological Seminary. New York: Longmans, Green, and Co., 1909.
  - Updated version: Philosophy of Revelation: A New Annotated Edition. Edited by Cory Brock and Nathaniel Gray Sutanto. Peabody: Hendrickson, 2018.
- The Sacrifice of Praise: Meditations Before and After Receiving Access to the Table of the Lord. Translated by John Dolfin. Grand Rapids: Louis Kregel, 1922. (Original: 1901)
  - Updated Version: The Sacrifice of Praise. Translated and edited by Cameron Clausing and Gregory Parker. Peabody, Hendrickson: 2019.

Articles:

- Bavinck, Herman (1892). "Recent Dogmatic Thought in the Netherlands (Translated by Geerhardus Vos)". The Presbyterian and Reformed Review. 3 (10): 209–28.
- Bavinck, Herman (1894). "The Future of Calvinism (Translated by Geerhardus Vos)". The Presbyterian and Reformed Review. 5 (17): 1–24.
- Bavinck, Herman (1910). "The Reformed Churches in the Netherlands". The Princeton Theological Review. 8 (3): 433–60.
- Bavinck, Herman (1992). "The Catholicity of Christianity and the Church" (PDF). Calvin Theological Journal. 27 (2): 220–251.
- Bavinck, Herman (2017). "My Journey to America". Edited by George Harinck. Translated by James Eglinton. Dutch Crossing: Journal of Low Countries Studies. 41 (2):180–93.

== See also ==
- Conclusions of Utrecht
- John Bolt (theologian)

== Resources ==
- Our Reasonable Faith (Chinese Translation)
- Bolt, John (2013). A Theological Analysis of Herman Bavinck's Two Essays on the Imitatio Christi: Between Pietism and Modernism. Lewiston: The Edwin Mellen Press. ISBN 978-0779907045.
- Bolt, John (2015). Bavinck on the Christian Life: Following Jesus in Faithful Service. Wheaton: Crossway. ISBN 978-1433540776.
- Eglinton, James P. (2012). Trinity and Organism: Towards a New Reading of Herman Bavinck's Organic Motif. London and New York: T&T Clark. ISBN 978-0567632715.
- Gleason, Ron (2010). Herman Bavinck: Pastor, Churchman, Statesman, and Theologian. Phillipsburg: P&R. ISBN 978-1596380806.
- Woo, B. Hoon (2015). "Bavinck and Barth on Schleiermacher's Doctrine of Revelation". Korea Reformed Theology. 48: 38–71. doi:10.34271/krts.2015.48..38.
