= Quotations from the Hebrew Bible in the New Testament =

There are in all 283 direct quotations from the Hebrew Bible (Old Testament) in the New Testament.

New Testament authors also quote from other sources. The synoptic gospels have Jesus quoting from or alluding to deutero-canonical works several times, such as the Wisdom of the Son of Sirach. Paul makes three quotations from classical poets. The Epistle of Jude quotes the pseudepigraphal Book of Enoch (1 Enoch 1:9) and the Assumption of Moses.

== Formatting ==
When the New Testament was written, the Old Testament was not divided into chapters and verses, and there is therefore no uniform standard for these quotes and the authors had to provide contextual references:

- When Luke 20:37 refers to Exodus 3:6, he quotes from "Moses at the bush", i.e. the section containing the record of Moses at the bush.
- Mark 2:26 refers to 1 Samuel 21:1–6, in the words "in the days of Abiathar".
- Romans 11:2 refers to 1 Kings ch. 17–19, in the words, "in Elias", i.e. in the portion of the history regarding Elijah.

== In popular culture ==
In November 2022, the game show Jeopardy! created a controversy after Bible experts disagree about which of Paul's letters had the most Old Testament quotations.

The controversy was not the amount of Old Testament scripture was in letters written by Paul, but rather whether Paul wrote the book of Hebrews which Jeopardy said was the correct answer. There was a time when scholars believed Hebrews was written by Paul, but this was not the predominant opinion in the ancient world (Origen), or of Protestant scholars at the time of the Reformation (Luther, Calvin). Most scholars now agree that it was written not by Paul, but by an unknown author.

== Bibliography ==
- Gregory Beale and D. A. Carson. Commentary on the New Testament Use of the Old Testament. Grand Rapids, Mich [u.a.]: Baker Academic [u.a.], 2008. ISBN 0-8010-2693-8
- Archer, Gleason Leonard, Gregory Chirichigno, and Evangelical Theological Society. Old Testament Quotations in the New Testament. Chicago: Moody Press, 1983. ISBN 0-8024-0236-4
- Brooke Foss Westcott, Fenton John Anthony Hort. The New Testament in the Original Greek, 1925, pp. 601–618
