= Applied semantics =

Application of semantics to the real world

Applied semantics is the study and application of semantics which have real-world applications, such as advertising, text analysis, web traffic of search engines, web page rankings, and the indexing of words. The term 'applied semantics' is widely considered to be first coined by Plantinga, where he distinguished the differences between "pure" and "applied" semantics.

Pure semantics is defined as semantics in the purely theoretical (sometimes referred to as mathematical) sense. By contrast, applied semantics is defined as the practical use of semantics, such as assigning meanings to words or deducing entailments. Dummet summarizes the distinction by terming pure semantics as "the merely algebraic notion of logical consequence" and applied semantics as "the semantic notion of logical consequence properly so called".
