= Orthodox Protestant Reformed Churches =

The Orthodox Protestant Reformed Churches (OPRC) constituted a short-lived Protestant denomination in the United States. It formed in 1953 following a split in the Protestant Reformed Churches in America and lasted until 1961, when most congregations merged with the Christian Reformed Church in North America, from which the PRCA had split in 1924. At its height, it had 19 congregations.

Hubert DeWolf had succeeded Herman Hoeksema as minister of First Protestant Reformed Church in Grand Rapids, Michigan. In the early 1950s DeWolf began to teach the conditional covenant theology of the Reformed Churches in the Netherlands (Liberated), and in 1953 stated in a sermon that "Our act of conversion is a prerequisite to enter into the kingdom of heaven." Hoeksema regarded this as heretical and the congregation, and then the denomination, split over the issue.

Clarence Stam argues that in the split "the Protestant Reformed Churches fell into the same practice as the Christian Reformed Church earlier," that of "non-confessional bindings".
