= Commentary on the New Testament Use of the Old Testament =

2007 book edited by G. K. Beale and D. A. Carson

- Author: G. K. Beale and D. A. Carson
- Genre: Bible commentary
- Publisher: Baker Academic
- Publication date: 2007
- Pages: 1,152
- ISBN: 9780801026935

Commentary on the New Testament Use of the Old Testament was edited by G. K. Beale and D. A. Carson, and published by Baker Books in 2007.

It is a comprehensive Bible commentary on Old Testament references within the New Testament. The editors headed a team of scholars to identify, explain and comment on both the direct quotations within the text of the New Testament and its many other probable allusions to the Old.

In a 2008 interview, Beale explained that the writers eclectically extended the historical-grammatical method of exegesis, seeking a "biblical-theological perspective that really goes beyond the traditional understanding of grammatical-historical."

== Contributors ==
NT books	Contributors
Matthew	Craig L. Blomberg (Denver Seminary)
Mark	Rikk E. Watts (Regent College)
Luke	David W. Pao and Eckhard J. Schnabel (both of Trinity Evangelical Divinity School)
John	Andreas J. Kostenberger (Southeastern Baptist Theological Seminary)
Acts	I. Howard Marshall (University of Aberdeen)
Romans	Mark A. Seifrid (Southern Baptist Theological Seminary)
1 Corinthians	Roy E. Ciampa (Gordon–Conwell Theological Seminary) and Brian S. Rosner (Moore Theological College)
2 Corinthians	Peter Balla (Karoli Gaspar Reformed University, Budapest)
Galatians and Philippians	Moisés Silva
Ephesians	Frank S. Thielman (Beeson Divinity School)
Colossians	G. K. Beale (Wheaton College Graduate School)
1 and 2 Thessalonians	Jeffrey A. D. Weima (Calvin Theological Seminary)
The pastoral epistles	Philip H. Towner (United Bible Societies)
Hebrews	George H. Guthrie (Union University)
The general epistles	D. A. Carson (Trinity Evangelical Divinity School)
Revelation	G. K. Beale and Sean M. McDonough (Gordon–Conwell Theological Seminary)

== Reception ==
The commentary won the 2008 Christianity Today Award of Merit in Biblical Studies, was finalist in the 2008 Christian Book Award in the Bible and Reference Category, and was named Academic Book of the Year (2008) by the Association of Theological Booksellers.

Although it was the work of a team of Protestant scholars, Catholic apologist Scott Hahn welcomed the Commentary as "a momentous accomplishment" and "invaluable resource" for Protestants and Catholics alike.

== Availability ==
As well as a 1,152-page print edition, the Commentary is available in digital form as an e-book for Amazon Kindle, and as a Bible software add-on for products including Accordance, Logos, QuickVerse and WORDsearch.
