= OPRC =

OPRC may refer to:

- International Convention on Oil Pollution Preparedness, Response and Co-operation, an International Maritime Organization treaty since 1990
- Orthodox Protestant Reformed Churches, a Protestant denomination in the United States (1953–1961)
