= Plantinga =

Plantinga is a surname. Notable people with the surname include:

- Alvin Plantinga (born 1932), American analytic philosopher
- Cornelius Plantinga (born 1946), president of Calvin Theological Seminary in Grand Rapids, Michigan from 2002 through 2011
- Klaas Plantinga (1846–1922), Dutch distiller and founder of the Plantinga Distillery in Bolsward
- Leon Plantinga, American musicologist
- Piet Plantinga (1896–1944), Dutch water polo player
