= Common grace =

Theological concept in Calvinism

Common grace is a theological concept in Protestant Christianity, developed primarily in Reformed (Calvinistic) thought, referring to the grace of God that is either common to all humankind, or common to everyone within a particular sphere of influence (limited only by unnecessary cultural factors). It is common because its benefits are experienced by, or intended for, the whole human race without distinction between one person and another. It is grace because it is undeserved and sovereignly bestowed by God. In this sense, it is distinguished from the Calvinistic understanding of special or saving grace, which extends only to the elect, (Note: See election in Christianity.) those whom God has chosen to redeem.

Sam Storms writes that common grace is

every favor, falling short of salvation, which this undeserving and sin-cursed world enjoys at the hand of God; this includes the delay of wrath, the mitigation of our sin-natures, natural events that lead to prosperity, and all gifts that human use and enjoy naturally.

== Aspects of common grace ==
In the words of Reformed scholar Louis Berkhof, “[Common grace] curbs the destructive power of sin, maintains in a measure the moral order of the universe, thus making an orderly life possible, distributes in varying degrees gifts and talents among men, promotes the development of science and art, and showers untold blessings upon the children of men,” (Berkhof, p. 434, summarizing Calvin’s position on common grace). The various aspects of God's common grace to all mankind may be generally gathered under four heads:

Providential care in creation – God’s sustaining care for his creation, called divine providence, is grace common to all. The Bible says, for instance, that God through the Son "upholds the universe by the word of his power" (Heb. 1:2–3; John 1:1–4). God's gracious provision for his creatures is seen, for example, in the giving of the seasons, of seedtime and harvest. It is of this providential common grace that Jesus reminds his hearers when he said God "makes his sun rise on the evil and on the good, and sends rain on the just and on the unjust" (Matt. 5:45). We also see evidence of God’s common grace in the establishment of various structures within human society. At a foundational level, God has ordained the family unit. Even pagan parents typically know that they should nurture their children (Matt. 7:9-10) and raise them to become responsible adults.

Providential restraint of sin – In the Bible, Paul teaches that civil authorities have been "instituted by God" (Rom. 13:1) to maintain order and punish wrongdoing. Although fallible instruments of his common grace, civil governments are called "ministers of God" (Rom. 13:6) that should not be feared by those who do good. God also sovereignly works through circumstances to limit a person's sinful behavior (Gen. 20:6, 1 Sam. 25:26).

In man's conscience – The apostle Paul says that when unbelieving Gentiles "who do not have the law, by nature do what the law requires, they are a law to themselves, ...They show that the work of the law is written on their hearts, while their conscience also bears witness, and their conflicting thoughts accuse or even excuse them" (Rom. 2:14–15, ESV). By God's common grace fallen mankind retains a conscience discerning the moral value of doing good over evil. This may be based on the fact that human beings, though fallen in sin, retain a semblance of the "image of God" with which they were originally created (Gen. 9:6: 1 Cor. 11:7).

Providential blessings to mankind – Human advancements that come through the unredeemed are seen as outcomes of God's common grace. For example, medical and other technological advancements that improve the lives of both the redeemed and unredeemed are seen as initiated by common grace.

In summary, common grace is seen in God's continuing care for his creation, his restraining human society from becoming altogether intolerable and ungovernable, his making it possible for mankind to live together in a generally orderly and cooperative manner, and maintaining man's conscious sense of basic right and wrong behavior.

Opponents agree that such phenomena appear at work in civilizations, and cannot operate outside God's providence, but to call this "grace" leads to a diminution of saving grace in the same way undue emphasis on General Revelation diminishes the ultimate authority of Scripture.

== Contrasted with special grace ==
Special grace, in Reformed theology, is the grace by which God redeems, sanctifies, and glorifies his people. Unlike common grace, which is universally given, special grace is bestowed only on those whom God elects to eternal life through faith in Jesus Christ. This special grace is frequently linked with the five points of Calvinism as irresistible grace or efficacious grace.

Common Grace is God working in the heart of the sinner to emulate the Christian life but not effectually saving that sinner. This is a most important distinctive of historical Calvinism as it is a distinctive made by John Calvin in his book the Institutes of the Christian Religion and by a number of Confessions of faith for Calvinistic denominations originally in Europe. It is also the distinction made by later theologians such as Abraham Kuyper of the Netherlands, Louis Berkhof and R. C. Sproul. Following Kuyper, Berkhof sees three categories of common grace:

1. Universal Common Grace, a grace that extends to all creatures;
2. General Common Grace, a grace that applies to mankind in general and to every member of the human race;
3. Covenant Common Grace, a grace that is common to all those who live in the sphere of the covenant, whether they belong to the elect or not.

== Theological issues ==
=== Within Calvinism ===
One of the earliest writers on common grace was the Dutch Reformed theologian Abraham Kuyper. The specifics of the Reformed doctrine of common grace have been somewhat controversial and at times bitterly contested by some Calvinists. Especially in the Dutch tradition, it has been the cause of divisions. For example, in a 1924 Synod of the Christian Reformed Church (CRC), the CRC adopted what became known as the "Three Points of Common Grace." Certain ministers within the CRC refused to subscribe to those "Three Points," and they (with the majority of their consistories) were either suspended or deposed from office. Thus began the Protestant Reformed Churches in America. These ministers, and others after them, wrote responses to the decision that was taken and ever since, the Protestant Reformed Churches have maintained that these "Three Points" were contrary to Scripture and the Reformed Confessions.

The position of Herman Hoeksema and all leaders of the Protestant Reformed Churches is unique to the denomination, and is based on a high view of the word "grace" as a Biblical concept of favor applied only to the elect. According to Hoeksema (and any PRC writer) God's undeserving gifts of sunshine, rain, etc. are "providence" and while providence serves grace for believers, because it adds to their spiritual growth, it is not sent in love to unbelievers and only adds condemnation to those who never believe, in the same way rain is beneficial to a living tree but causes a dead one to rot. Connected to the first point of common grace, which asserts that God's "common grace" is demonstrated in a "general offer" of the gospel, Hoeksema asserted that such a view is pure Arminianism. While God commands all men to repent and believe and this command must be preached to all, Hoeksema insisted this command, like all other commands to godliness in the Bible, is not a "well-meant offer" since it is impossible for unregenerated, totally depraved man to truly perform apart from God's saving grace.

=== Between Calvinism and Arminianism ===
Both Calvinists and Arminians generally accept the concept of common grace in that there are undeserved blessings which God extends to all humankind. However, the Arminian sees this common grace including what has been termed "common sufficient grace" or the Wesleyan "prevenient grace" whereby the effects of the fall are offset such that all persons now have free will and the moral ability to understand spiritual things and turn to God in Christ for salvation. The Calvinist maintains that God's common grace does not improve man's unregenerate nature, nor does it improve his ability to change his moral standing before God.

== See also ==
- Divine grace
- Irresistible grace
- Prevenient grace
- Abraham Kuyper – author of "De Gemene Gratie" (Common Grace; 1902–1905)
- Christian Nationalism
- Imago Dei
- Theonomy
