= First Protestant Reformed Church in Grand Rapids, Michigan =

Christian congregation

Coordinates: 42°58′07.5″N 85°35′59.4″W

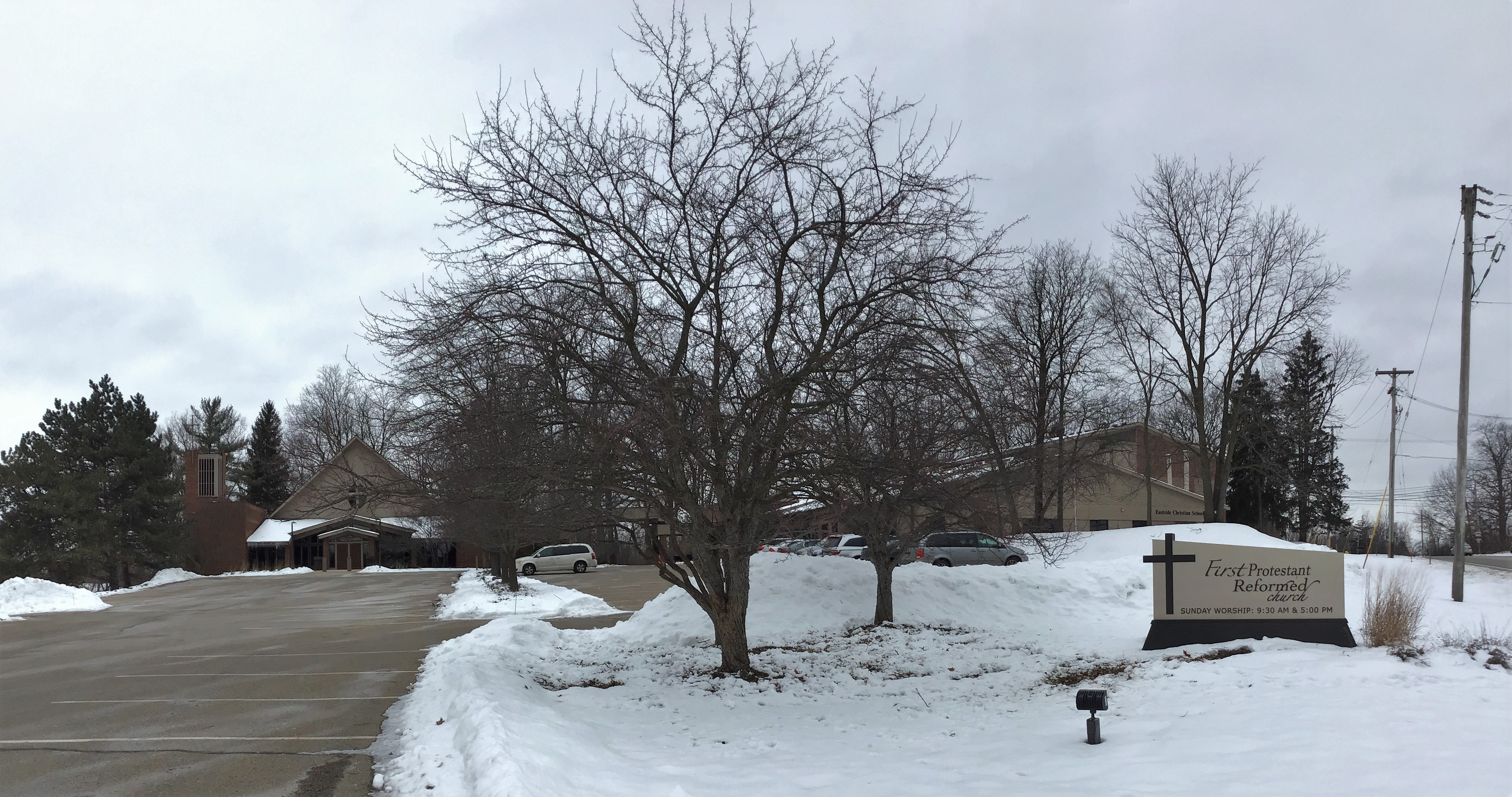
The church

First Protestant Reformed Church is Reformed congregation in Grand Rapids, Michigan. This was the first and founding congregation of the Protestant Reformed Churches in America.

== History ==
It was organised in 1879 as East Street Christian Reformed Church. The congregation followed Herman Hoeksema to pull out of the CRCNA and form the Protestant Reformed Churches in America. The congregation adopted the name First Protestant Reformed Church, Grand Rapids in January 1926. A minority remained as East Avenue Christian Reformed Church.

Under Rev. Hoeksemas leadership, the congregation thrived in the 1940s. In 1944, Rev. Hubert DeWolf became the second pastor of First Protestant Reformed. Rev J. Hanko joined the staff in 1948. In early 1950s, DeWolf begun to preach covenant theology, to appeal to congregants that had come from the Reformed Churches in the Netherlands (Liberated). Rev. Hoeksema opposed this, and believed that the offer of salvation is for only the elected. After a further schism in 1953, the congregation divided again, one group led by Hoeksema and Hanko, the other by Rev. Hubert De Wolf. This resulted in two denominations called Protestant Reformed Church until the group led by De Wolf reunited with the CRCNA in 1961.

== Theology ==
The church adheres to the Apostles Creed, Heidelberg Catechism, Canons of Dort, and Belgic Confession.

== Location ==
The church building is located in southeastern Grand Rapids at the corner of Fuller Avenue and Franklin Street. In 1985, the church relocated to Michigan Street in Grand Rapids.

== Pastors ==
- J. Post, 1881–87
- S. B. Sevensma, 1887-1900
- Johannes Groen, 1900–19
- Herman Hoeksema, 1920–53, 1955–64
- R. Veldman, 1939–44
- Hubert De Wolf, 1944–53, deposed, formed Orthodox Protestant Reformed Churches
- Cornelius Hanko, 1948–63
- George M. Ophoff, 1953–55
- Gise J. Van Baren, 1965–77
- Meindert W. Joostens, 1987–95
- James Slopsema, 1995–2014
- Cory Griess, 2018–present
