= John Bolt (theologian) =

American-Dutch Reformed theologian

John Bolt (born October 7, 1947) is a Dutch American Reformed theologian who served as professor emeritus of systematic theology at Calvin Theological Seminary in Grand Rapids, Michigan. He is the author and editor of several books. Bolt's theological method was influenced by the Dutch theologian Herman Bavinck, and he was the lead editor of Reformed Dogmatics, an English translation of Bavinck's work Gereformeerde Dogmatiek.

== Education and career ==
John Bolt was born in 1947 in Grootegast, Netherlands, and immigrated to Canada at the age of three. He grew up in Ladner, British Columbia, a suburb south of Vancouver and initially remained in British Columbia to study chemistry at Simon Fraser University. Bolt then moved to Grand Rapids, Michigan to study theology at Calvin Theological Seminary, where he earned a bachelor's degree in 1973 and a master's degree in 1977. Bolt completed his Ph.D. in Theology at University of St. Michael's College, in Toronto, in 1982. His dissertation was titled "The Imitation of Christ Theme in the Cultural Ethical Ideal of Herman Bavinck".

Bolt served as pastor of two congregations in British Columbia. He taught in the religion departments of Calvin University from 1980 to 1982, and Redeemer University from 1982 to 1989. In 1989, he joined the faculty of Calvin Theological Seminary, where he served as professor emeritus of systematic theology.

Bolt edited Reformed Dogmatics, an English translation of a four volume work by the Dutch theologian Herman Bavinck. In addition, he has written books including Christian Reformed Today and The Christian Story and the Christian School. Bolt retired in 2017.

== Personal life ==
Bolt is married to his wife Ruth, and has three children and nine grandchildren, including Jordan Bolt. He enjoys visiting National Parks and Major League Baseball ballparks of North America.

== Works ==
- Economic Shalom (2013)
- Bavinck on the Christian Life: Following Jesus in Faithful Service (2015)
- Orthodoxy and orthopraxis in the Reformed community today (ed., Christian Reformed perspectives, 1985)
- Christian and Reformed Today
- Five Studies in the Thought of Herman Bavinck (2012)
- A Theological Analysis of Herman Bavinck's Two Essays on the Imitatio Christi: Between Pietism and Modernism (2013)
- The Christian Story and the Christian School
- Christian and Reformed Today
- The Christian Story and the Christian School
- Herman Bavinck: The Man and the Mind
- How Christianity Transformed Our Understanding of History

== See also ==
- Herman Bavinck
