= Protestant Reformed Churches in America =

Protestant denomination

- Abbreviation: PRC or PRCA
- Classification: Protestant
- Orientation: Reformed
- Polity: Presbyterian
- Region: USA and Canada
- Founder: Herman Hoeksema
- Origin: 1924–1925; United States and Canada
- Separated from: Christian Reformed Church in North America
- Separations: Orthodox Protestant Reformed Churches (1953) Reformed Protestant Churches (2021)
- Congregations: 33
- Members: 8,200
- Primary schools: 12
- Secondary schools: 3

The Protestant Reformed Churches in America (PRC or PRCA) is a Protestant denomination of 33 churches and over 8,000 members.

== History ==
=== Beginning and formation ===
The PRC was founded in 1924 as a result of a controversy regarding common grace in the Christian Reformed Church. At that time the Christian Reformed Church had adopted three doctrinal points on the subject of common grace. Reverends Herman Hoeksema, George Ophoff, and Henry Danhof rejected these three points and maintained them to be contrary to the Reformed confessions of faith. Soon thereafter, when these men said they could not abide by these three points, they were disciplined through suspension, or deposition, from the ministry by their respective classes. The CRC maintained that the position of these three men was inconsistent with the Bible's teachings. The men objected to this deposition also from a church political point of view, arguing that only the consistory has the right to depose their minister, not a classis. The CRC disagreed, and these ministers, as well as their followers, were deposed by the CRC and organized into a new denomination, taking the name of Protesting Christian Reformed Churches. The denomination later renamed itself the Protestant Reformed Churches in America. Rev Hoeksema become the pastor of the First Protestant Reformed Church in Grand Rapids, Michigan.

=== Schisms ===
The Protestant Reformed Churches grew rapidly in the following years, but in the 1950s the denomination struggled because of internal, doctrinal controversies in defense of the unconditionality of the Covenant of Grace. Hubert DeWolf, who had become the pastor of the First Protestant Reformed Church in Grand Rapids, was influenced by the theology of the Reformed Churches in the Netherlands (Liberated), this included conditional theology. DeWolf began to preach sermons which promoted conditional theology, because he saw the ever increasing number of immigrants that were part of the Reformed Churches in the Netherlands (Liberated) in the Netherlands, and he believed that this could be an opportunity to grow the church. Hoeksema saw this as heresy and insisted that salvation is only for the elect, including the baptized children of believers, and that those who were not elect could not receive salvation. DeWolf and his supporters were suspended in 1953. That year 60% of the denomination membership, the so-called "DeWolf Group", formed the Orthodox Protestant Reformed Church (OPRC). Before the schism the denomination had 6,063 members (1953)—the PRC has passed this membership mark as of 1994. The remaining 40% continued as the Protestant Reformed Church with 2,353 members. DeWolf worked for the reunion of the CRCNA. The union took place in 1961 and as a result seven OPRC congregations were dissolved, with their members joining other Christian Reformed congregations, and four became part of the CRCNA denomination-Hope CRC in Hull, Iowa, Alamo Ave CRC in Kalamazoo, MI, Bethel CRC in Redlands, CA and Faith CRC in Grand Rapids, Michigan.

In 2021–2022, a number of pastors and elders, along with hundreds of members of the PRC left to establish a new denomination named the "Reformed Protestant Church." The impacted congregations included Byron Center, Michigan, Dyer, Indiana, Hull, Iowa, and Edmonton, Canada. Sister churches of the PRC in the Philippines and Singapore were also effected, which led to a number of people leaving to form two distinct church works in those countries. One of the seceding pastors, Rev. Andrew Lanning stated that "the doctrinal issue itself is the ABC’s of the gospel and the 123’s of the covenant: Fellowship with God is by grace and is unconditional." A split also occurred in the PRC's unofficial publishing arm the "Reformed Free Publishing Association." Shortly before the schism, several members left and joined a rival publishing house called "Reformed Believers Publishing."

== Period of recent growth ==
The PRC has continued to grow since the schism of 1953. In 1994 the membership passed the 6,053 members it had at the time of the schism. The turmoil within the CRCNA resulted in a number of former CRC members joining local Protestant Reformed Churches. No CRC congregations affiliated with the PRC changed denomination, but one pastor, Rev. Audred Spriensma and a number of CRC families from Alamosa, Colorado joined the Protestant Reformed Church in 1993.

In 2004 a former Orthodox Christian Reformed congregation in Listowel, Ontario became part of the Protestant Reformed Churches and, as of 2004, is known as Wingham PRC.

== Statistics ==
According to the Yearbook 2017 of the Protestant Reformed Churches the communicant (4,982) and non-communicant (3,645) members; numbers 8,627. The PRCA has 2,118 family units and 33 churches in Classis East and Classis West combined. The denomination has four missionaries and four professors.

== Distinctive doctrine ==
The PRC believes that the Bible is the infallible and inerrantly inspired word of God and that the message therein is well summarized in the Three Forms of Unity: the Heidelberg Catechism, the Belgic Confession, and the Canons of Dordt. While the PRC approves of most of the Westminster Confession of Faith, it does not endorse it. This is partly due to a different understanding of marriage and divorce and the covenant of works.

The PRC believes that marriage is a lifelong bond and that, although an individual may divorce his or her spouse for continued infidelity, the marriage bond is not dissolved apart from death. Hence, neither party is permitted to remarry while the other person is still living. Those who do divorce and remarry while their first spouse is still alive are considered adulterers, regardless of the circumstances of the divorce.

The PRC holds that God's covenant is only with his elect and that it is unconditional (meaning that there are no conditions that people must fulfill to enter into the covenant or to stay in the covenant) though good works are needed to enjoy the covenant and repentance is required in order to be forgiven according to the Acts of Synod 2018. The PRC rejects Antinomianism, believing instead that God calls the people of the covenant to believe and obey and that he personally and entirely produces in them the required faith and works.

In public worship services, the PRC sing the Psalms with organ accompaniment. In contrast to exclusive psalmody, it does permit the singing of certain hymns, but not in worship services. The PRC believes that preaching is the most important part of a worship service. Article 69 of the church order adopted by the Synod of Dordt states that: "In the churches only the 150 Psalms of David, the Ten Commandments, the Lord's Prayer, the Twelve Articles of Faith, the Songs of Mary, Zacharias, and Simeon, the Morning and Evening Hymns, and the Hymn of Prayer before the sermon shall be sung." It is a common practice within PRC services to open with the singing of the "Praise God from Whom All Blessings Flow" doxology and some end the service with the singing of the "May the Grace of Christ the Savior" doxology. Outside of the official church service, members are free to sing hymns and carols. Also, the PRC uses the King James Version of the Bible, although they do not endorse the King James Only movement and members are free to use other Bible versions.

The PRC holds to the truth of six literal day creation. They take the first chapter of Genesis to be a factual account of the creation, taking the words "the morning and the evening of the first day" to show a normal, twenty-four-hour day. Although micro evolution is accepted, macro evolution is seen as contrary to biblical teachings. They believe that God created the world to be mature, so that the stars were created to be millions of light years away, and the light to be already hitting the earth. Since the flood, micro evolution has occurred bringing about differences between animals in a population.

=== Church government ===
The denomination holds to the presbyterian form of church government and is organized in two classes, Classis East and Classis West (the eastern border of Illinois is the boundary between the two), which meet two or three times a year and in an annual Synod.

As reflected in the denomination's use of the plural "Churches" in its name, the PRC maintains that the denomination is not a church but a federation of churches, and that each of these churches is self-governing by a body of elders chosen out of the congregation. The PRC holds that God has given the "keys of the kingdom of heaven" (Matt. 16:18, which is understood as granting authority for the preaching of the gospel, and the exercise of church discipline) to the instituted church, not the denomination. Thus in the PRC only an instituted church can place an individual or a church officer under discipline. The PRC denies that a meeting of Classis or Synod has the authority to do this, though they may advise a congregation to do so.

At the same time the PRC maintains the binding authority of the decisions of the broader assemblies. Individuals and congregations must submit to these decisions if they are going to remain in the denomination, and if an individual congregation refuses to do so, the broader assembly has the authority to declare that congregation to be outside the federation of churches.

Only male members who have made a public confession of faith and are in good standing may vote for church officers or be ordained.

== Churches and missions ==
The PRC has 33 member churches throughout the United States and in Canada. A majority of the churches in the United States are in western Michigan but there are also churches in the midwestern and western United States.

List of Protestant Reformed churches
Classis	Congregation	Location	Members 2011	Members 2012	Members 2013
East	Byron Center PRC	Byron Center, Michigan	438	423	449
East	Cornerstone PRC	Dyer, Indiana	110	105	143
East	Faith PRC	Jenison, Michigan	550	567	579
East	First PRC	Grand Rapids, Michigan	239	236	239
East	First PRC	Holland, Michigan	241	250	237
East	Georgetown PRC	Hudsonville, Michigan	507	503	516
East	Grace PRC	Standale, Michigan	254	260	283
East	Grandville PRC	Grandville, Michigan	348	348	354
East	Hope PRC	Walker, Michigan	438	438	454
East	Hudsonville PRC	Hudsonville, Michigan	512	511	536
East	Kalamazoo PRC	Kalamazoo, Michigan	65	66	67
East	Providence PRC	Hudsonville, Michigan	144	154	166
East	Southeast PRC	Grand Rapids, Michigan	254	266	267
East	Southwest PRC	Wyoming, Michigan	366	367	358
East	Trinity PRC	Hudsonville, Michigan	382	408	425
East	Wingham PRC	Wingham, Ontario	61	63	70
West	Bethel PRC	Roselle, Illinois	58	62	60
West	Calvary PRC	Hull, Iowa	222	240	240
West	Covenant of Grace PRC	Spokane, Washington	33	36	45
West	Crete PRC	Crete, Illinois	496	494	462
West	Doon PRC	Doon, Iowa	174	160	155
West	Edgerton PRC	Edgerton, Minnesota	83	86	86
West	First PRC	Edmonton, Alberta	127	111	113
West	Heritage PRC	Sioux Falls, South Dakota	56	59	61
West	Hope PRC	Redlands, California	245	246	250
West	Hull PRC	Hull, Iowa	477	484	499
West	Immanuel PRC	Lacombe, Alberta	120	120	122
West	Loveland PRC	Loveland, Colorado	289	292	302
West	Lynden PRC	Lynden, Washington	99	97	106
West	Peace PRC	Lansing, Illinois	208	210	196
West	Randolph PRC	Randolph, Wisconsin	210	215	215
Total			7806	7877	8055

The PRC has few formal relationships with most reformed denominations and organizations. The PRC contributed greatly to the development of two churches in Singapore, the First Evangelical Reformed Church in Singapore (no longer in relationship with the PRC since 2007) and Covenant Evangelical Reformed Church. The PRC also has relationships with a small fellowship in New Zealand; the Evangelical Presbyterian Church (Australia); a sister church in Northern Ireland, the Covenant Protestant Reformed Church in Ballymena, and Limerick Reformed Fellowship was founded with the help of the PRC and; the Protestant Reformed Churches in Myanmar.

The PRC has also developed contacts in India, Germany, Myanmar, Venezuela and in Singapore; there is a sister Reformed Church in Singapore. Currently, the PRC is engaged in missions in a few locations in the United States, and they have recently organized a church in the Philippines and several mission churches were started. The Berean Reformed Church was organised in 2006, and the All of Grace Protestant Reformed Fellowship in Gabaldon, the Philippines, recently a new work is underway, the Provident Christian Church in Manila. The Georgetown PRC is involved in mission in India. In 2005, the Synod of the PRC closed the denomination's missionary field work in Ghana, due to a lack of membership.

== Christian education ==
The PRC holds that "it is necessary for them to maintain good, Christian schools in which their children are educated". To this end, Protestant Reformed parents maintain twelve primary and three high schools for the education of approximately 1500 children.

Home schooling in the PRC is strongly discouraged when a Protestant Reformed school is available. The 2009 PRC Synod forbad office bearers from using home education for their children in most situations, stating that an office bearer is "expected to send his children to those (PRC) schools unless there are special circumstances judged by his consistory to be valid." David Engelsma, Professor Emeritus of the Protestant Reformed Seminary writes that "Even though home-schooling of their children might be possible for a few, specially gifted parents whose circumstances provide the time that is needed, home-schooling is still not an option".

The denomination supports the Protestant Reformed Theological School in Grandville, Michigan.

== Organizations ==
Also closely tied with the denomination, is the Reformed Free Publishing Association, a publisher of theological and other Christian books by PRC authors and of a semi-monthly magazine The Standard Bearer, located in Jenison, Michigan. The denomination is also closely connected with The Reformed Witness Hour, a radio broadcast.
