= Jeffrey A. D. Weima =

American theologian

Jeffrey Alan David Weima
- Born: Jeffrey Alan David Weima
- Education: PhD, Wycliffe College, University of Toronto
- Alma mater: Wycliffe College, University of Toronto
- Known for: Professor of New Testament at Calvin Theological Seminary.

Jeffrey Alan David Weima (PhD, Wycliffe College, University of Toronto) is an American theologian. He has held the position of Professor of New Testament at Calvin Theological Seminary since 1992.

He was awarded a B.A. (Brock University, 1983), M.Div. (Calvin Theological Seminary, 1986), Th.M. (Calvin Theological Seminary, 1987), Ph.D. (Wycliffe College, University of Toronto, 1992). Weima has concentrated his research and writing on the Pauline letters, particularly 1-2 Thessalonians. He is an ordained minister in the Christian Reformed Church of North America.

== Bibliography ==
- Neglected Endings: The Significance of the Pauline Letter Closings (Sheffield Academic Press, 1994) ISBN 9781850754886
- An Annotated Bibliography of 1 and 2 Thessalonians (Brill, 1998) ISBN 9789004107403
- 1 & 2 Thessalonians in Zondervan illustrated Bible backgrounds commentary (Zondervan 2002)
- 1 and 2 Thessalonians BECNT (Baker Books, 2014) ISBN 9780801026850
- Paul the Ancient Letter Writer. An Introduction to Epistolary Analysis. (Baker Books, 2016).
- The Sermons to the Seven Churches of Revelation (Baker Books, 2021)
