= Leon Plantinga =

American musicologist

Leon B. Plantinga is an American musicologist specializing in music of the later eighteenth and nineteenth centuries. His writings have influenced scholarship on Clementi, Beethoven, and Schumann, and his textbook Romantic Music continues to serve as a standard textbook on nineteenth-century music in American universities. Having served as a faculty member of the Department of Music at Yale University from 1963 to 2005, he is now a member of the emeritus faculty. He is the brother of philosopher Alvin Plantinga and theologian Cornelius Plantinga.

He is the author of Beethoven's Concertos: History, Style, Performance. (New York: W. W. Norton, 1999. [xi, 403 p. + 1 booklet of music examples, 108 p. ISBN 0-393-04691-5)

== List of books ==
- Schumann As Critic (Yale University Press, 1967)
- Clementi: His Life and Music (Oxford University Press, 1977)
- Romantic Music (W.W. Norton, 1984)
- Beethoven's concertos: History, style, performance (W.W. Norton, 1999)
