= Louis Berkhof =

Dutch theologian (1873–1957)

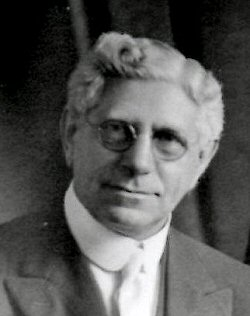
- Born: 13 October 1873; Emmen, Netherlands
- Died: 18 May 1957 (aged 83); Grand Rapids, Michigan, U.S.
- Education: Calvin Theological Seminary; Princeton Theological Seminary
- Occupation: Theologian · Author · Professor
- Notable work: Systematic Theology (1932; rev. 1941)
- Spouses: Reka Dijkhuis (m. 1900; died 1928) Dena Heyns-Joldersma (m. 1933)
- Children: Grace Meyer, William, Jean Stuk, and John
- Theological work
- Era: Late 19th and early 20th centuries
- Language: English, Dutch
- Tradition or movement: Reformed theology · Neo-Calvinism
- Main interests: Systematic theology

Louis Berkhof (13 October 1873 – 18 May 1957) was a Dutch-American Reformed theologian whose works on systematic theology have been influential in North American seminaries and Bible colleges throughout the 20th century.

== Personal life ==
Berkhof was born on 13 October 1873 in Emmen in the Netherlands and moved in 1882 with his family to Grand Rapids (Michigan). His family were members of the Christelijke Gereformeerde Kerk, a secession group from the Dutch Reformed Church. Berkhof grew up in the Christian Reformed Church in America; he became a committed Christian at the age of 19, and was secretary to the first Reformed Young Men’s Society in Grand Rapids.

About the time he graduated from the seminary he married Reka Dijkhuis; they went on to have six children before her death in 1928. In 1933, he married Dena Heyns-Joldersma who had two daughters; she was a music teacher and the widow of a missionary.

== Education and career ==
Berkhof entered the Theological School of the Christian Reformed Church in Grand Rapids at the age of 19, in which the studies included a 4-year literary course (expanded into Calvin College) and a 3-year theological course (expanded into Calvin Theological Seminary). During this period, he learnt under Hendericus Beuker who introduced him to the works of Abraham Kuyper and Herman Bavinck.

In 1900, he graduated from the seminary in Grand Rapids after which he was appointed pastor of the First Christian Reformed Church in Allendale Charter Township, Michigan; two years later (1902), he attended Princeton Theological Seminary where he earned his B.D. in two years. He studied under B. B. Warfield and Geerhardus Vos during his time in Princeton. He then went on to study at the Divinity School of the University of Chicago for two years. Subsequently, Berkhof returned to Grand Rapids to minister at the Oakdale Park Church for another two years.

In 1906, he joined the faculty of Calvin Theological Seminary and taught there for almost four decades. For the first 20 years he taught Biblical Studies until in 1926 he moved into the systematic theology department. He became president of the seminary in 1931 and continued in that office until he retired in 1944.

== Publications ==
Berkhof wrote twenty-two books during his career. His main works are his Systematic Theology (1932, revised 1938) which was supplemented with an Introductory Volume to Systematic Theology (1932, which is included in the 1996 Eerdman's edition of Systematic Theology) and a separate volume entitled History of Christian Doctrines (1937). He wrote a more concise version of his Systematic Theology for high school and college students entitled Manual of Christian Doctrine, and later wrote the even more concise Summary of Christian Doctrine. He also delivered Princeton Theological Seminary's Stone Lectures in 1921. These were published as The Kingdom of God. In addition to this, he worked on many papers for the Christian Reformed Church as well as collections of sermons.

== Bibliography in English ==
- The church and social problems (Grand Rapids: Eerdmans-Sevensma, 1913)
- Life Under the Law in a Pure Theocracy: or, The Significance of the Book of Judges (Grand Rapids: Eerdmans-Sevensma, 1913)
- Biblical archeology (Grand Rapids: Eerdmans-Sevensma, 1915)
- Paul the Missionary (Grand Rapids: Eerdmans-Sevensma, 1915)
- New Testament introduction (or special canonics) (Grand Rapids: Eerdmans-Sevensma, 1915)
- The Christian laborer in the industrial struggle (Grand Rapids: Eerdmans-Sevensma, 1916)
- Subjects and outlines (Grand Rapids: Eerdmans-Sevensma, 1918)
- Why Reformed Young Men's Societies? Address delivered at the 10th annual convention of the American Federation of Reformed Young Men's Societies, October 10, 1929 (Chicago: American Federation of Reformed Young Men's Societies, 1929)
- Manual of Reformed doctrine (Grand Rapids: Wm. B. Eerdmans Pub. Co., 1931)
- Systematic Theology (1932)
- Reformed Dogmatics (Grand Rapids: Eerdmans, 1932)
- Vicarious atonement through Christ (Grand Rapids: Wm. B. Eerdmans Pub. Co., 1936)
- History of dogma (Grand Rapids: Wm. B. Eerdmans Pub. Co., 1937)
- Summary of Christian doctrine for senior classes (Grand Rapids: Wm. B. Eerdmans Pub. Co., 1938)
- Assurance of Faith (Grand Rapids, Wm. B. Eerdmans Pub. Co., 1939)
- Systematic theology (Grand Rapids: Wm. B. Eerdmans Pub. Co., 1941)
- Recent trends in theology (Grand Rapids: Wm. B. Eerdmans Pub. Co., 1944)
- Riches of divine grace; ten expository sermons (Grand Rapids, Wm. B. Eerdmans Pub. Co., 1948)
- Principles of Biblical interpretation: sacred hermeneutics (Grand Rapids: Baker Book House, 1950)
- Aspects of liberalism (Grand Rapids: Eerdmans, 1951)
- Kingdom of God: the development of the idea of the kingdom, especially since the eighteenth century (Grand Rapids: Eerdmans, 1951)
- The second coming of Christ (Grand Rapids: Wm. B. Eerdmans Pub. Co., 1953)
- History of Christian doctrines (London: Banner of Truth Trust, 1969)

== Legacy ==
Berkhof was not known for being original or speculative but for being very good at organizing and explaining basic theological ideas following in the tradition of John Calvin, Abraham Kuyper and Herman Bavinck. Theologian Wayne Grudem has called Berkhof's Systematic Theology "a great treasure-house of information and analysis [...] probably the most useful one-volume systematic theology available from any theological perspective." Berkhof's writings continue to serve as systematic presentations of Reformed theology. They are organized for use in seminaries and religious education as well as individual reference, though his systematics works are demanding reads.

One of the prominent students of Berkhof is Cornelius Van Til, whose thoughts became the major position of the tradition of Westminster Theological Seminary in the areas of apologetics and epistemology. Berkhof and Til wrote a book together entitled, Foundations of Christian Education.
