= Adrio König =

South African theologian and writer (1936–2022)

Adrio König (1936 – 20 July 2022) was a South African theologian and writer. He was a professor of systematic theology at Unisa since 1975 and was known as a gifted writer of numerous academic as well as popular books and articles. He was sought after as a speaker, preacher, lecturer, and debater in the media. He wrote in both Afrikaans and English.

== Estimated List of Works ==
- Jesus Christus die Eschatos
- The Eclipse of Christ in Eschatology: Toward a Christ-Centered Approach
- Hy Kan Weer en Meer
- New and Greater Things: Re-evaluating the Biblical Message on Creation (Studia Originalia / UNISA)
- Here I Am!: A Believer's Reflection (Manualia - Unisa)
- Here Am I!: A Christian Reflection on God
- The Gospel is at Stake, ISBN 9780796313454 (NB Publishers)
- Back to the Old Testament, ISBN 9780796318848 (NB Publishers)
- Live Out Your Baptism
- Paul - The Intruder Apostle Who Saved the Gospel ISBN 978-1-4316-1528-5 (Christian Publishers [CUM])
- Christ Above All: The Book of Hebrews (Transformative Word). Bellingham, Washington.
- Is the Bible Reliable? - What About All the Problems?
- God, Why Does the World Look Like This? - What Does It Mean to Say God Is in Control?
- A Perspective on Revelation
