= Cornelius Plantinga =

American theologian (born 1946)

- Born: Cornelius Plantinga Jr. February 14, 1946 (age 80); Jamestown, North Dakota, U.S.
- Education: Calvin University (AB); Calvin Theological Seminary (BD); Princeton Theological Seminary (PhD)
- Occupations: Theologian, academic administrator
- Organizations: Calvin Theological Seminary; Calvin Institute of Christian Worship
- Known for: President of Calvin Theological Seminary
- Notable work: Not the Way It's Supposed to Be; Engaging God's World
- Relatives: Alvin Plantinga (brother); Leon Plantinga (brother)

Cornelius "Neal" Plantinga Jr. (born 14 February 1946) is an American theologian. He served as president of Calvin Theological Seminary in Grand Rapids, Michigan from 2002 to 2011.

== Early life and education ==
Plantinga was born on February 14, 1946 in Jamestown, North Dakota, the son of a psychology professor who taught at Calvin College for 25 years.

He received an AB degree from Calvin College in 1967, a BD degree from Calvin Theological Seminary in 1971, and a PhD degree from Princeton Theological Seminary in 1982. He is the brother of philosopher Alvin Plantinga and musicologist Leon Plantinga.

== Career ==
Plantinga served as the pastor of churches in New York and New Jersey after graduating from seminary in the 1970s.

He joined the faculty at Calvin Seminary in 1979 and taught systematic theology there until 1996, when he became Dean of the Chapel at Calvin College.

Plantinga was appointed President of Calvin Seminary in 2001. He served as President from 2002 until 2011. During Plantinga's presidency, Calvin Seminary received its largest gift up to that time from the Richard and Helen DeVos Foundation to fund the Charles W. Colson Presidential Chair at the seminary.

He was Senior Research Fellow at the Calvin Institute of Christian Worship, Calvin University from 2012 until his retirement in 2024.

Plantinga has written several books, including Not the Way It's Supposed to Be (Eerdmans, 1995), the Christianity Today "Book of the Year" in 1996, and Engaging God's World (Eerdmans, 2002), a Christianity Today "Book of the Year" in 2003. He presented the Warfield Lectures at Princeton Theological Seminary in 2012.

== Personal life ==
Plantinga is married to Kathleen (Talsma) Plantinga, and has two children.

== Selected publications ==
- Plantinga, Cornelius (1995). Not the Way It's Supposed to Be: A Breviary of Sin. Eerdmans.
- Plantinga, Cornelius (2001). Beyond Doubt: Faith-Building Devotions on Questions Christians Ask. William B. Eerdmans Publishing Company.
- Plantinga, Cornelius (2002). Engaging God's World: A Christian Vision of Faith, Learning, and Living. William B. Eerdmans Publishing Company.
- Plantinga, Cornelius (2013). Reading for Preaching: The Preacher in Conversation with Storytellers, Biographers, Poets, and Journalists. William B. Eerdmans Publishing Company.
- Plantinga, Cornelius (2021). Morning and Evening Prayers. William B. Eerdmans Publishing Company.
- Plantinga, Cornelius (2023). Under the Wings of God. Brazos Press.
- Plantinga, Cornelius (2024). Gratitude: Why Giving Thanks Is the Key to Our Well-Being. Brazos Press.
