= Roger S. Greenway =

American Christian missionary (1934–2016)

- Born: January 8, 1934
- Died: April 30, 2016 (aged 82); Rockford, Michigan, U.S.
- Occupations: Missionary, missiologist, seminary professor, author
- Known for: Urban missiology; global missions leadership; seminary teaching
- Spouse: Edna Greenway
- Children: 6

Roger Selles Greenway (January 8, 1934 – April 30, 2016) was an American missionary, missiologist, professor, and author. He served with Christian Reformed World Missions in Sri Lanka and Mexico, taught at Westminster Theological Seminary and Calvin Theological Seminary, and wrote extensively on urban missions and church growth.

== Early life and education ==
Roger S. Greenway was born on January 8, 1934, the only child of Dr. Leonard Greenway, a minister in the Christian Reformed Church, and Catherine (Selles) Greenway. He earned a B.A. from Calvin College and B.D. and Th.M. degrees from Calvin Theological Seminary. He later completed a Ph.D. at Southwestern Baptist Theological Seminary in 1972.

== Career and ministry ==
Ordained in the Christian Reformed Church in 1958, Greenway was appointed to serve with Christian Reformed World Missions (CRWM) in Sri Lanka, where he worked until 1962.

In 1963 he moved to Mexico City to teach at Juan Calvino Seminary. He later founded the Instituto Mexicano Bíblico to train urban pastors and church planters. He was also the editor of The Herald from 1960 to 1962.

Greenway was the Latin America Secretary for Christian Reformed World Mission from 1972 to 1978, and coordinated the Spanish Literature Committee during the same period. He was also active in Jewish outreach and became a member of the Lausanne Committee for Jewish Evangelism.

In 1978 he became pastor of Burton Heights Christian Reformed Church in Grand Rapids, Michigan, the congregation where his father had once served. Greenway taught at Westminster Theological Seminary from 1982 to 1986. He then worked as executive director of Christian Reformed World Missions from 1986 to 1990.

Greenway joined the faculty of Calvin Theological Seminary in 1990 as Professor of World Missiology and dean of students, where he worked from 1990 until his retirement in 2001. In addition, he was Missionary in Residence and Research Fellow at Yale Divinity School.

Greenway taught courses at other seminaries including Trinity Evangelical Divinity School and Fuller Theological Seminary. He also lectured in North, Central, and South America and in Europe.

== Publications and scholarship ==
Greenway wrote books in English and Spanish, many of which were translated into more than a dozen languages. He also published hundreds of journal and magazine articles. His works focused on missions, evangelism, urban ministry, and church growth. He also was editor of the journal Urban Mission from 1983 to 1990.

== Selected works ==
- Greenway, Roger S. (1973). An Urban Strategy for Latin America. Baker Book House. ISBN 9780801036675.
- Greenway, Roger S. (1976). Guidelines for Urban Church Planting. Grand Rapids, Mich.: Baker Book House. ISBN 978-0-8010-3707-8.
- Greenway, Roger S. (1978). Apostles to the City: Biblical Strategies for Urban Missions. Baker Book House. ISBN 9780801037245.
- Greenway, Roger S. (1992). Discipling the City: A Comprehensive Approach to Urban Mission. Grand Rapids, Mich.: Baker Book House. ISBN 978-0-8010-3849-5.
- Greenway, Roger S. (1998). Together Again: Kinship of Word and Deed. Monrovia, Calif.: MARC.
- Greenway, Roger S. (1999). Go and Make Disciples!: An Introduction to Christian Missions. Phillipsburg, N.J.: P & R Publishing. ISBN 978-0-87552-218-0.
- Greenway, Roger S.; Timothy M. Monsma (2000). Cities: Missions' New Frontier. Grand Rapids, Mich.: Baker Academic. ISBN 978-0-8010-2230-2.
- Greenway, Roger S. (2013). Fish: The Call of the Master Fisher. Grand Rapids, Mich.: Theophilus Publishing. ISBN 978-0-615-41657-1.

== Personal life and death ==
Greenway and his wife Edna (Beebe) were married for 61 years and had six children. He died on April 30, 2016, in Rockford, Michigan, following complications from a stroke suffered in 2014.

== Legacy ==
In 2006 a Festschrift was published entitled For God So Loved the World: Missiological Reflections in Honour of Roger S. Greenway.

== See also ==
- Harvie M. Conn
- Christian Reformed Church in North America
