= Herman Hoeksema =

Dutch Reformed theologian

Herman Hoeksema (13 March 1886 in Hoogezand – 2 September 1965 in Grand Rapids) was a Dutch Reformed theologian. Hoeksema served as a long time pastor of the First Protestant Reformed Church in Grand Rapids. In 1924 he refused to accept the three points of common grace as formulated which had then been declared official church dogma of the Christian Reformed Church, as an addition to its adopted creeds and confessions. The result of this controversy was that Hoeksema, and ministers George Ophoff, and Henry Danhof, were deposed by their respective classes before leaving the CRC with their congregations. These men then established the Protestant Reformed Churches. Hoeksema also served as professor of theology at the Protestant Reformed Theological Seminary in Grandville, Michigan for 40 years.

== Early life ==
Hoeksema was born in the province of Groningen in the Netherlands and immigrated to the US in 1904. He married Nellie Kuiper on June 7, 1914. The officiating minister was Prof. Louis Berkhof, who was the principal author of the Three points of Common Grace, and later the doctrinal opponent of Hoeksema. The marriage of Herman and Nellie produced 5 children: Joanna, Jeanette, Herman Jr., Homer, and Lois.

After studying at Calvin Theological Seminary in Grand Rapids, Michigan, he began his ministerial career in 14th St. Christian Reformed Church in Holland, Michigan (1915-1920) and then accepted the call to serve the Eastern Avenue Christian Reformed Church of Grand Rapids (1920-1924/5) - by this time one of the largest Reformed congregations in the United States.

In February 1918, Hoeksema refused to allow the American flag in the sanctuary of 14th St Christian Reformed Church (Holland, MI) during worship. This decision received strong opposition. In response the Michigan Tradesman printed that any preacher who barred the flag from his church had "forfeited the right to exist among decent people". He also led the debate, and the 1918 CRC Synod, in condemning the dispensational premillennialism of Rev. Harry Bultema of Muskegon, Michigan who denied that Christ is King of his church. Hoeksema and his close colleague Henry Danhof also worked on behalf of the Seminary Curatorium in a study committee that led the 1922 CRC Synod to produce a report examining the teachings of Seminary Professor Ralph Janssen about Scripture and miracles, and subsequently decided that Janssen's views on Scriptures denied that Holy Writ was infallible and inspired in all it parts.

At the end of his career he served in the dual role of pastor of First Protestant Reformed Church in Grand Rapids, Michigan (1924/5 - 1965) and Professor of New Testament Studies and Reformed Dogmatics at the Protestant Reformed Theological Seminary.

== Works ==
Hoeksema was editor of the Protestant Reformed Magazine, the "Standard Bearer". He also authored many books including:

- Whosoever Will, a negative critique of Arminian Protestantism
- Righteous by Faith Alone, Herman Hoeksema's sermons on the book of Romans
- Behold He Cometh, a commentary on the Book of Revelation
- The Triple Knowledge, a multi-volume exposition of the Heidelberg Catechism
- Reformed Dogmatics, Herman Hoeksema considered this his major work and it is a frequently quoted writing in opposition to the "covenant of works."

== Theology ==
Herman Hoeksema was unique in his emphasis of the covenant of grace in that God's love for his chosen was an unconditional love of a friendship where the believers walked with God like Enoch, Noah, and Abraham, and were "friend[s] of God". He believed that this covenant of friendship is not a unilateral or bilateral agreement and it does not contain conditions, requirements, or demands.

Hoeksema described the covenant of grace as a relationship of friendship and communion between God and the elect. He argued that the biblical concept of covenant emphasizes a living relationship between God and the elect rather than a contractual agreement or pact.

Hoeksema, following Martin Luther in The Bondage of the Will, rejected the use of “merit” to describe the relationship between man and God, arguing that obedience is a duty rather than a means of earning reward. He also denied the traditional Reformed doctrine of the covenant of works, arguing that Scripture does not teach that Adam was promised eternal heavenly life on the basis of obedience. Instead, Hoeksema maintained that obedience to God has its own inherent reward in life and joy, while sin brings death and misery.

== Bibliography ==
- Hoeksema, Gertrude (1969), Therefore Have I Spoken: A Biography of Herman Hoeksema, ISBN 0-8254-2810-6
- Baskwell, P.J. (2006), Herman Hoeksema: A Theological Biography, Amsterdam: Vrije Universiteit, — available online in PDF

== See also ==
- Covenant theology
- Herman Bavinck
- Gerrit Cornelis Berkouwer
- Klaas Schilder
