= Calvin Theological Seminary =

Christian Reformed seminary

Coordinates: 42°55′39.3″N 85°35′11.94″W

- Motto: My heart I offer to you, Lord, promptly and sincerely
- Type: Private seminary
- Established: 1876
- Affiliations: Calvin University, MIAA, Council for Christian Colleges and Universities
- Religious affiliation: Christian Reformed Church
- President: Julius Medenblik
- Faculty: 35
- Students: 379
- Location: Grand Rapids, Michigan, United States
- Campus: 1-acre (0.405 ha), suburban
- Tagline: A community of faith. A center of learning. A life of ministry.
- Mascot: John Calvin
- Website: www.calvinseminary.edu

Calvin Theological Seminary is a private Christian Reformed Church seminary in Grand Rapids, Michigan. It is closely tied to Calvin University, though each institution has its own board.

== History ==
The seminary was founded in 1876 with the purpose of preparing ministers for the Christian Reformed Church. Originally it met on Spring Street in Grand Rapids, but in 1892 it was moved to Madison Avenue and Franklin Street. In 1917 it moved to the Franklin Street location. It began holding classes on the Knollcrest Campus, its current location, in 1960.

In 1894, the seminary began to offer eight literary courses for the preparation for seminary studies. In 1900 these courses were expanded and made open to non-seminary students. The school enrolled its first four female students in 1901. In 1908, the school expanded to include a full four years of high school education and two years of college, and in 1914 this was expanded to three years. In 1919 and 1920 respectively, a college president and a fourth year of college education were added, which led to the formation of Calvin College.

=== Presidents ===
- Geert Egberts Boer
- Louis Berkhof
- Samuel Volbeda
- Rienk B. Kuiper
- John H. Kromminga
- James A. De Jong
- Cornelius Plantinga
- Jul Medenblik

== Academics ==
The seminary primarily prepares students for ordained ministry within the denomination through the Master of Divinity degree, but also grants master's degrees (MA, MTS) in other subjects including worship, education, missions, and theological studies.

The seminary also offers a Th.M. with concentrations in Old Ancient Near Eastern Languages and Literature, New Historical Theology, Systematic Theology, Philosophical and Moral Theology, Pastoral Care, Church Polity and Administration, Preaching, Worship, Educational Ministry, and Missions, as well as the Ph.D. degree in historical, systematic, and philosophical theology, and in ethics.

In addition to formal degrees, the seminary offers continuing education, including courses that are open to visitors, lectures, book discussion groups, and conferences for clergy and those in the community.

== Notable alumni and faculty ==
- Louis Berkhof
- John Bolt
- Clarence Bouma
- Roger S. Greenway
- Anthony Hoekema
- Herman Hoeksema
- James Kennedy, professor of the history of the Netherlands at the University of Amsterdam
- Barend Klaas Kuiper, professor of history, who was dismissed after watching a movie.
- Rienk Kuiper
- Richard Muller
- James Olthuis
- Cornelius Plantinga
- Lewis Smedes
- John Stek
- Cornelius Van Til
- Geerhardus Vos
- Jeffrey A. D. Weima
