= Richard Gaffin =

American Calvinist theologian and Presbyterian minister

Richard B. Gaffin Jr.
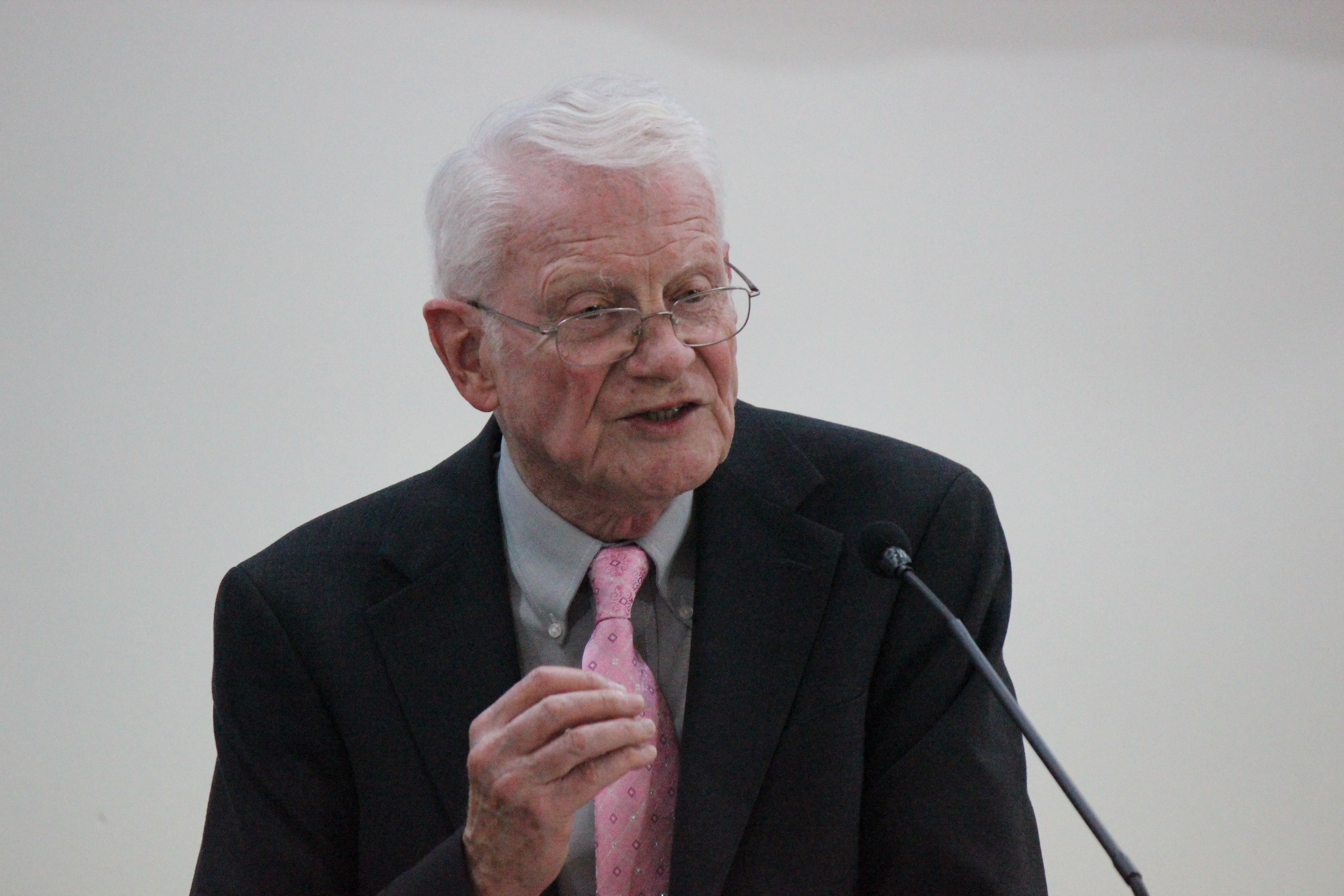
- Gaffin speaking at Hapdong Theological Seminary, 2017
- Born: July 7, 1936 (age 90); Peiping, China (now Beijing)
- Education: Calvin College (BA, 1958); Westminster Theological Seminary (BD, 1961; Th.M., 1962; Th.D., 1969); University of Göttingen (graduate studies, 1962–63)
- Occupations: Theologian, Presbyterian minister
- Employer: Westminster Theological Seminary
- Known for: Biblical theology, Pauline soteriology, cessationism
- Spouse: Jean Young (m. 1958; d. 2019)
- Children: Richard III, Steven, Lisl

Richard B. Gaffin Jr. (born July 7, 1936) is an American Calvinist theologian, Presbyterian minister, and professor emeritus at Westminster Theological Seminary in Philadelphia, Pennsylvania. He held the Charles Krahe Chair of Biblical and Systematic Theology from 1999 to 2008, and has been Professor Emeritus of Biblical and Systematic Theology since 2008. He is widely regarded as one of the preeminent Reformed biblical theologians of the twentieth and early twenty-first centuries, and has taught at Westminster since 1965.

A son of Orthodox Presbyterian Church missionaries to China and Taiwan, Gaffin's scholarly work has centered on building upon the redemptive-historical biblical theology of Geerhardus Vos and applying it to Pauline soteriology, eschatology, and the doctrine of the Holy Spirit. His 1969 doctoral dissertation, published as Resurrection and Redemption, is considered a landmark contribution to the study of Paul's theology.

== Early life and family ==
Gaffin was born on July 7, 1936, in Peiping (modern-day Beijing), China, to Richard B. Gaffin Sr. and Pauline Gaffin, who were serving as missionaries with the Orthodox Presbyterian Church's Committee on Foreign Missions. He may have been the first covenant child born in the newly formed Orthodox Presbyterian Church, which J. Gresham Machen and others had founded just twenty-six days before his birth.

When World War II broke out, the Gaffin family relocated to America, settling first in Milwaukee, Wisconsin, where the family worshiped at Grace OPC. In November 1947, Richard Sr. returned to China to explore reestablishing the mission, but when that door closed, the family moved to Wyncote, Pennsylvania. Richard Jr. made his public profession of faith at Calvary OPC in Glenside in April 1951.

After attending William Penn Charter School and a brief period at the University of Southern California (1954), Gaffin transferred to Calvin College in Grand Rapids, Michigan, in 1956, at the encouragement of his pastor and the presence of close friends, including Jean Young.

His father, Richard B. Gaffin Sr. (1907–1996), was a missionary to China and Taiwan from 1935 to 1976, and one of the founders of the Reformed Presbyterian Church in Taiwan. He was also the first person to introduce confessional Reformed faith to the people of Taiwan.

== Education ==
Gaffin received a Bachelor of Arts from Calvin College in 1958. He then enrolled at Westminster Theological Seminary (WTS), where he earned a Bachelor of Divinity (1961), a Th.M. (1962), and a Th.D. (1969). For his master's dissertation under John Murray, Gaffin studied John Calvin's doctrine of the Sabbath — a project that introduced him to the biblical theology of Geerhardus Vos, whose influence would define his subsequent career.

Having been awarded a WTS faculty stipend for graduate study abroad, Gaffin attended the Georg-August University of Göttingen in Germany in 1962–63. He returned to Philadelphia, completed his doctorate in 1969 with a dissertation entitled "Resurrection and Redemption: A Study in Pauline Eschatology," and was ordained as a minister of the Orthodox Presbyterian Church on June 15, 1965.

On August 23, 1958, Gaffin married Jean Young, daughter of the accomplished Westminster Old Testament professor E. J. Young. They had three children: Richard III (born 1962), Steven (born 1964), and Lisl (born 1967). Jean died in 2019 after sixty years of marriage.

== Academic career ==
=== Westminster Theological Seminary (1965–2008) ===
Gaffin joined the faculty of Westminster Theological Seminary in 1965 as a teaching fellow in New Testament, becoming the twenty-second professor to sign the Faculty Book at Westminster. He was promoted to assistant professor in 1968, associate professor, then professor of New Testament in 1978, and moved from the New Testament field to the Systematic Theology field in 1986. He was appointed to the Charles Krahe Chair of Biblical and Systematic Theology in 1999, a position he held until his retirement in 2008, when he became Professor Emeritus.

During his forty-three years of full-time teaching at Westminster, over 350 future ministers of the OPC sat under his instruction, a figure unmatched in the history of the denomination. Teaching at WTS, Gaffin sought to promote J. Gresham Machen's Reformed orthodoxy, Cornelius Van Til's presuppositional apologetic, and Vos's biblical theology. He taught that the method of the theological enterprise is found in Scripture itself, and that believers share a common redemptive-historical horizon with the Apostle Paul — together looking back to the death, resurrection, and ascension of Jesus Christ while awaiting his return.

=== Theological contributions ===
Gaffin's scholarship occupies the intersection of biblical theology and systematic theology. Building on the work of Geerhardus Vos and Herman Ridderbos, his theological contributions have covered union with Christ, justification, the Holy Spirit, the Sabbath, resurrection, and eschatology. He has been described as a perceptive critic of liberal theology in the arenas of hermeneutics, Gospels and Pauline studies, systematic theology, and New Testament introduction, and as a vigorous participant in the theological controversies over the doctrine of justification, theonomy, and the doctrine of Scripture that affected Westminster in the late twentieth century.

Peter Lillback, President of Westminster Theological Seminary, wrote in a 2012 tribute that Gaffin's distinguishing quality has not been primarily his written output, but his "quiet, resolute defense of orthodoxy rooted in enviable exegetical skills" — describing him as "a quiet giant in a theologically Lilliputian world." Sinclair Ferguson described Gaffin as having "laid bare the deep foundations of the gospel in a way that enhances appreciation of its unsearchable riches."

==== Redemptive-historical biblical theology ====
At the heart of Gaffin's theology is the conviction that Scripture must be interpreted according to the history of redemption — the historia salutis — which reaches its decisive turning point in the death, resurrection, and ascension of Christ. Drawing on Vos's insight that Scripture is the interpretation of God's redemptive activity in history, Gaffin argued in his dissertation Resurrection and Redemption (1969; published 1987) that the resurrection of Christ is not merely an event in the past but the eschatological event which inaugurates the new creation. Believers' union with the risen Christ by faith constitutes the foundation of all of Paul's soteriology.

==== Cessationism ====
Gaffin has been an influential defender of the cessationist position, which holds that certain revelatory gifts of the Holy Spirit — such as prophecy, tongues, and miraculous healing — ceased with the completion of the biblical canon and the death of the apostles. In Perspectives on Pentecost (1979), Gaffin argued that the outpouring of the Holy Spirit at Pentecost belongs to the historia salutis as a once-for-all turning point in redemptive history, not as a normative post-conversion experience available to individual believers in the present age. His essay "A Cessationist View" was republished in the widely used symposium volume Are Miraculous Gifts for Today? edited by Wayne Grudem (Zondervan, 1996), and is included in his collected works Word and Spirit (2023).

== Church service ==
Gaffin has been an ordained minister of the Orthodox Presbyterian Church since 1965 and has given extensive service to the denomination at every level. He served on the Committee on Foreign Missions (CFM) beginning in 1969 and became its president, a role he held for over fifty years until retiring from committee service in 2021. He moderated the Fifty-First (1984) General Assembly of the OPC. He also served on several OPC special committees, including the Special Committee on Sabbath Matters (1969), the Special Committee on Scripture and Inspiration (1969), the Committee on Hermeneutics (1984), the Committee on the Hermeneutics of Women in Office (1985–87), and the Special Committee on the Doctrine of Justification (2004–06). No individual in the history of the OPC has been elected or appointed to more special committees than the fourteen on which Gaffin has served.

In 1993, Gaffin helped establish Gwynedd Valley OPC (since 2007 Cornerstone OPC in Ambler, Pennsylvania), in which he and his wife Jean were active members for twenty-five years, including service on the session.

== Norman Shepherd controversy ==
Gaffin was the leading defender of then-fellow faculty member Norman Shepherd during the controversy over the doctrine of justification that took place at Westminster Theological Seminary from 1975 to 1982. In 1980, Shepherd was removed as a professor by the Westminster Board of Trustees; he subsequently transferred his credentials to the Christian Reformed Church. Despite the theological differences that subsequently emerged between them, Gaffin and Shepherd remained in conversation through the years.

== Personal life ==
Gaffin married Jean Young, daughter of E. J. Young, on August 23, 1958. They had three children: Richard III, Steven, and Lisl. Jean died in 2019 after sixty-one years of marriage. The couple had moved to the Washington, DC area in 2016 and began worshiping at Grace Presbyterian Church in Vienna, Virginia, where his son Richard III serves as a ruling elder. He transferred to the Presbytery of the Mid-Atlantic at that time.

== Books ==
- Resurrection and Redemption: A Study in Paul's Soteriology, 2nd ed. (P&R, 1987). ISBN 978-0875522715
- Perspectives on Pentecost: New Testament Teaching on the Gifts of the Holy Spirit (P&R, 1979; repr. 1993). ISBN 978-0875522692
- Calvin and the Sabbath: The Controversy of Applying the Fourth Commandment, revised ed. (Mentor, 2009). ISBN 978-1857923766
- God's Word in Servant-Form: Abraham Kuyper and Herman Bavinck and the Doctrine of Scripture (Reformed Academic Press, 2008). ISBN 978-0980037005
- By Faith, Not By Sight: Paul and the Order of Salvation, 2nd ed. (P&R, 2013). ISBN 978-1596384439
- No Adam, No Gospel: Adam and the History of Redemption (P&R, 2015). ISBN 978-1596389670
- In the Fullness of Time: An Introduction to the Biblical Theology of Acts and Paul (Crossway, 2022). ISBN 978-1433563348
- Word and Spirit: Selected Writings in Biblical and Systematic Theology, edited by David B. Garner and Guy Prentiss Waters (Westminster Seminary Press, 2023). ISBN 978-1955859011

== Edited volumes ==
- Herman Nicolaas Ridderbos, Redemptive History and the New Testament Scriptures, revised ed., ed. Richard B. Gaffin Jr. (P&R, 1988)
- Redemptive History and Biblical Interpretation: The Shorter Writings of Geerhardus Vos, ed. Richard B. Gaffin Jr. (P&R, 2001)
- J. P. Versteeg, Adam in the New Testament: Mere Teaching Model or First Historical Man?, ed. Richard B. Gaffin Jr. (P&R, 2012)
- Thy Word Is Still Truth: Essential Writings on the Doctrine of Scripture from the Reformation to Today, ed. Richard B. Gaffin Jr. and Peter A. Lillback (P&R, 2013)
- Geerhardus Vos, Reformed Dogmatics, 5 vols., ed. and trans. Richard B. Gaffin Jr. (Lexham Press, 2014–2016)

== Contributed essays (selected) ==
- "Geerhardus Vos and the Interpretation of Paul," in Jerusalem and Athens, ed. E. R. Geehan (P&R, 1980) — a Festschrift for Cornelius Van Til
- "Theonomy and Eschatology: Some Reflections on Postmillennialism," in Theonomy: A Reformed Critique, ed. William S. Barker and W. Robert Godfrey (Zondervan, 1990)
- "A Cessationist View," in Are Miraculous Gifts for Today?, ed. Wayne Grudem (Zondervan, 1996)
- "Union with Christ: Some Biblical and Theological Reflections," in Always Reforming: Explorations in Systematic Theology, ed. A. T. B. McGowan (IVP Academic, 2007)
- "What 'Symphony of Sighs'? Reflections on the Eschatological Future of the Creation," in Redeeming the Life of the Mind: Essays in Honor of Vern Poythress, ed. John M. Frame, Wayne Grudem, John J. Hughes (Crossway, 2017)

== Academic articles (selected) ==
- "Paul as Theologian," Westminster Theological Journal, May 1968
- "The Usefulness of the Cross," Westminster Theological Journal, Spring 1979
- "The Holy Spirit," Westminster Theological Journal, Fall 1980
- "Old Amsterdam and Inerrancy?" Westminster Theological Journal, Fall 1982 and Fall 1983
- "The Holy Spirit and Eschatology," Kerux: The Journal of Northwest Theological Seminary, December 1989
- "Some Epistemological Reflections on 1 Corinthians 2:6-16," Westminster Theological Journal, Spring 1995
- "Pentecost: Before and After," Kerux: The Journal of Northwest Theological Seminary, September 1995
- "Paul the Theologian," Westminster Theological Journal, Spring 2000
