= Jan Ridderbos =

Jan Ridderbos (24 November 1879 in Bedum – 4 July 1960) was a minister in the Reformed Churches in the Netherlands and since 1912 professor of Old Testament at the Theological College (Old Street) in Kampen.

Jan Ridderbos was the father of Herman Nicolaas Ridderbos, later professor in Kampen, and Nicolaas Herman Ridderbos, later a professor at the Vrije Universiteit Amsterdam.

== Career ==
Ridderbos was one of the professors who put a clear stamp on the Reformed Churches during the Second World War. The synod's decision in Assen (1926) on the authority of the Bible was largely drafted by him and greatly influenced by him.

Ridderbos' doctorate in 1907 with a thesis on the theology of Jonathan Edwards. He served the congregations of Oosterend, Meppel and Bussum. In 1912 he was appointed by the Synod of the Reformed Churches professor at Kampen. He showed himself a capable Old Testament scholar. He has published a biblical statement on the Minor Prophets. He also wrote a study about Abraham and Paul. He was a contributor to the Christian Encyclopedia.

Ridderbos, with Gerrit Cornelis Berkouwer, had great influence on the reformed church's life before World War II. He was "preadviseur" of the synod in property damage Geelkerken (1926) and in the case involving Klaas Schilder who was accused of schism (1942 and 1944). In the congregation, he exercised a lot of influence through his editorship of the Reformed Weekly. As a scientist, he has especially many Reformed formed theologians and was his view of the authority of the Bible decisive in his circle until sometime in the early 1960s.

George Harinck suggests that, along with G. Ch. Aalders, Seakle Greijdanus, and F. W. Grosheide, Ridderbos "took the lead in Neo-Calvinist exegetical production."

== Selected works ==
- The Prophet Isaiah I (Brief explanation of Holy Scripture) (1922), Kampen
- The Prophet Isaiah II (Brief Explanation of the Holy Scriptures) (1926), Kampen
- I Psalms (Commentary on the Old Testament) (1955), Kampen
- The Psalms II (Commentary on the Old Testament) (1958), Kampen
