= PRMC =

PRMC may refer to:

- Potential Royal Marine Course, British military training
- Parents Music Resource Center, an American committee
- Presbyterian and Reformed Missions Council on Taiwan, part of Reformed Presbyterian Church in Taiwan
