= Rudolf van Reest =

Dutch writer (1897–1979)

Rudolf van Reest (12 April 1897 in Rotterdam – 29 November 1979 in Groenekan) was the pseudonym of the Dutch writer Karel Cornelis van Spronsen. Besides writing novels, he also wrote for the Dutch newspaper, originally a resistance periodical, Trouw. Themes of his oeuvre include religious small-mindedness of small, rural communities and the 'nobility' to which adherence to the true nature of the Christian faith can elevate believers from all walks of life.

== Biography ==
Rudolf van Reest is the pen name of Karel Cornelis van Spronsen, son of Gerard van Spronsen and Johanna Westdijk. He married Maria Taal on 27 October 1921, in Voorschoten. In 1931, Van Reest wrote his first novel, which was followed by a series of novels, such as De grote verwachting (The great expectation) and Het loon der genade (Forgiveness' reward), and also wrote histories and biographies. From 1933 to 1939 he lived in Baarn, and was editor-in-chief at the publishing firm of Oosterbaan en Le Cointre N.V.

During World War II he was active in the underground. After the liberation of The Netherlands in 1945, he was made a captain in the Military Authority at Utrecht with the assignment to eliminate the press which had co-operated with the Germans, and to establish the press which had worked "underground."

In 1946, Karel and his wife, Marie, made a trip to Canada, and also to the United States to visit Karel's brother, Cornelis van Spronsen, and his wife, Anna, and their family. He remained in America a year. This visit is described in his book, Van Kust tot Kust. (From Coast to Coast). From 1947 to 1961 Van Spronsen worked as director of the publishing house Oosterbaan en Le Cointre N.V. at Goes, and later moved to Groenekan.

Maria van Spronsen-Taal died 10 November 1970 and Karel van Spronsen died in 1979. Both are buried in Bilthoven.

== Bibliography ==
This is not a complete list:

- 1934 Zo'n rakker
- 1936 Soestdijk Palace|Paleis Soestdijk, de prinselijke woning
- 1937 Kuyper de Geweldige (with AC de Gooyer)
- 1937 Levensroman van dr. H. Colijn
- 1937 Menschen van de straat
- 1940 'n Onbegriepelijk mensch - het leven van Mr. W Bilderdijk
- 1941 Die van verre staan
- 1945 De Trouw der kleyne luyden
- 1946 Een bloedgetuige der Kerk - het leven en sterven van Johannes Kapteyn, Gereformeerd Predikant
- 1948 Van Kust tot Kust
- 1950 De Andere Wereld
- 1952 De Samaritaan
- 1953 De Grote Verwachting - Historische Roman uit de Volheid des Tijds (translated into English as Israel's Hope and Expectation)
- 1953 - 1958 Dichterschap en Profetie (4 volumes)
- 1955 Het loon der genade: een sociale roman uit het begin dezer eeuw
- 1956 Dirk Sterrenburg
- 1956 De Zoon
- 1965 De Wilde Christen
- 1969 De braambos (2 dln) - Geschiedenis Vrijmaking en vrijgemaakte kerk
- 1972 Terugzien na vijfentwintig jaren
- 1979 Door water en vuur: een verhaal uit de bezettingstijd
- 1990 Schilder's Struggle for the Unity of the Church (translation of earlier publication)
- year of publication not known: Vergeefse Vlucht, Glascultuur

== See also ==
- Hendrikus Colijn
- Reformed Churches in the Netherlands (Liberated)
- Klaas Schilder
- Trouw

== References and further reading ==
- Genealogy of the Van Spronsen Family, autobiography of Karel van Spronsen
- K.C. van Spronsen (Rudolf van Reest): 1897 - 1977, in De Reformatie, volume 52, no. 26 (405-418) (2 April 1977)
- Digitale bibliotheek voor de Nederlandse Letteren http://www.dbnl.org/auteurs/auteur.php?id=rees006 (retrieved 18/06/2011)
- Betoverde herinnering, 2: een vreemdeling in een vreemd land : Rudolf van Reest in Amerika / George Harinck, in: Liter Zoetermeer: vol. 4 (2001), afl. 16 (mrt), pag. 57-66.
- Reest, Rudolf van. Glascultuur. Baarn, 1947 / P.J. Risseeuw. In: Ontmoeting: vol. 2 (1947–1948), pag. 229.
- Reest, Rudolf van. De trouw der kleyne luyden: roman uit de Rotterdamse rampjaren van 1940-1945. Baarn, 1947] / Joh. van Hulzen. In: Ontmoeting: vol. 2 (1947–1948), pag. 234.
- Reest, Rudolf van. De zoon. Baarn, 1956] / Gerrit van Heerde. In: Ontmoeting: vol. 10 (1956–1957), afl. 8 (mei 1957), pag. 255-256.
