= Cornelis Trimp =

Dutch minister and theologian

Cornelis Trimp (18 January 1926 – 9 March 2012) was a Dutch minister and theologian.

Trimp was born in Amsterdam. He studied at the Theological College in Kampen and was ordained a minister in the Reformed Churches in the Netherlands (Liberated) in 1951. After pastoring a number of churches, he took up the position of Professor of Ministerial Studies at the Theological College in Kampen in 1970. This was shortly after the Liberated churches had experienced the departure of the Netherlands Reformed Churches in a denominational split, and Trimp "played an active role in keeping members together in the church after the split." He taught homiletics, catechetics, liturgics, and poimenics until his retirement in 1993.

Trimp was an exponent of redemptive-historical preaching. He followed Benne Holwerda in rejecting both "subjective" and "objective" preaching: "What is involved primarily is neither the subjective engagement of the heart nor the objective declaration of doctrine, but the address of the speaking God in the covenant."

Trimp served as editor of De Reformatie from 1966 to 1992.
