= Seakle Greijdanus =

Dutch Calvinist theologian (1871–1948)

Seakle Greijdanus (sometime rendered "Saekle", 1 May 1871 – 19 May 1948) was a Reformed theologian in the Netherlands, who first served in the Reformed Churches in the Netherlands and later in the Reformed Churches in the Netherlands (Liberated).

Greijdanus was born in Arum, Friesland and studied theology at the Free University in Amsterdam, where he specialized in dogmatics.

As a minister, he served the Reformed churches of Rozenburg, Zuid-Beijerland and Paesens-Moddergat. In 1917 he became professor at the Kampen Theological University.

Greijdanus wrote a number of commentaries in the Korte Verklaring series: Luke, Galatians, Ephesians, Philippians, Johannine epistles, Petrine epistles, and Revelation.

George Harinck suggests that, along with G. Ch. Aalders, F. W. Grosheide, and Jan Ridderbos, Greijdanus "took the lead in Neo-Calvinist exegetical production." Nevertheless, he opposed certain ideas propagated by the Neo-Calvinist Abraham Kuyper, and in 1944 he joined Klaas Schilder to form the Reformed Churches in the Netherlands (Liberated).

He died in Zwolle.
