= Grosheide =

Grosheide is a surname. Notable people with the surname include:

- F. W. Grosheide (1881–1972), Dutch New Testament scholar
- Hans Grosheide (1930–2022), Dutch politician and jurist
