= Scott Maslen =

English actor and model (born 1971)

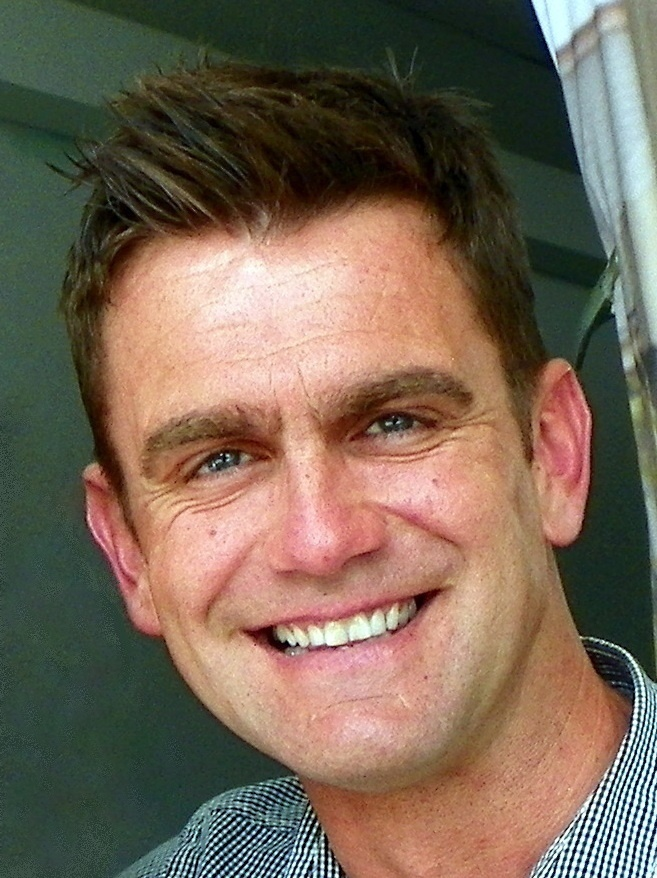
- Maslen in 2016
- Born: Scott Alexander Maslen; 25 June 1971 (age 55); Woolwich, London, England
- Occupations: Actor, former model
- Years active: 1989–present
- Television: The Bill (2002–2007); EastEnders (2007–2013, 2015–present); Strictly Come Dancing (2010); Celebrity MasterChef (2015)
- Spouse: Estelle Rubio (m. 2008)
- Children: 1

Scott Alexander Maslen (born 25 June 1971) is an English actor and model, best known for his portrayal as DS Phil Hunter in the ITV police drama series The Bill and Jack Branning in the BBC soap opera EastEnders since 2007. He also took part in the 2010 series of Strictly Come Dancing and the 2015 series of Celebrity MasterChef. He portrayed Claude Speed in the live-action trailer for Grand Theft Auto 2 in 1999.

== Early life ==
Maslen was born in Woolwich, south-east London, England on 25 June 1971. As a young boy Maslen admired the Royal Marines and attended Bromley Marines Cadets on a Monday and a Thursday at T.S. Narvik in Bromley Common. He was brought up in Woolwich and signed up to join the Royal Marines with his school friends, Marcus Marnham and Simon Farnham at the age of 16. He later sustained an injury whilst doing the PRMC (Potential Royal Marines Course), resulting in him not gaining entry to the Recruit training course. He has been a vegetarian since the age of 18; he discussed this on appearances on both The Paul O'Grady Show and Friday Night with Jonathan Ross.

== Career ==
At the age of 18 he went to Miami and was spotted by photographer Bruce Weber. As a result of this encounter he began a career as an international model. Five years later, he turned to acting. After training at the Guildhall School of Music and Drama, he landed a role in the successful television series Lock, Stock... in 2000. He has also played the live action rendition of Claude Speed in DMA Design's promotional video and opening sequence for Grand Theft Auto 2. After a few more television and film roles he landed his part in The Bill in 2002.

On 13 July 2007 it was announced that Maslen would be leaving The Bill and joining the cast of EastEnders as regular character Jack Branning. His love interest was Ronnie Mitchell, played by best friend Samantha Womack. Both actors commented that they were uncomfortable doing love scenes since they have known each other most of their lives and are like brother and sister. Maslen left EastEnders on 15 October 2013.

Maslen performed in the pantomime Aladdin at the Pavilion Theatre, Bournemouth over the Christmas/New Year period of 2013/2014. He performed the same pantomime at the Marlowe Theatre, Canterbury over the Christmas/New Year period of 2014/2015. He performed it again at the Churchill Theatre, Bromley over Christmas/New Year 2015/2016.

Maslen made an unannounced return to the show on 24 December 2015, later confirming that this would be permanent. Maslen said "It was like I hadn't left. It felt a bit strange because there are new characters who I don't know – but that fits with the story".

=== Strictly Come Dancing ===
Maslen participated in the 2010 series of Strictly Come Dancing with professional dancer Natalie Lowe and his performances were favourably received by the judges. He was the 2nd celebrity of 2010 to score a 10 from the judges, following fellow EastEnders actress Kara Tointon scoring a 10 for her Pasodoble in week 5, the same week where Maslen scored three 10s for his Viennese Waltz. In week 7 he also received three 10s for his Jive, with Bruno stating that it was the best Jive since former EastEnders star Jill Halfpenny's in Series 2, and received just one point less. Maslen showed a natural talent for dancing, topping the leaderboard on many occasions, however was eliminated in week 11 of the series.

Week No	Dance/song	Judges' score					Result
Week No	Dance/song	Horwood	Goodman	Dixon	Tonioli	Total	Result
1	Waltz / "I Never Loved a Man the Way I Love You"	6	7	8	8	29	Safe
2	Salsa / "Let's Hear It for the Boy"	8	8	8	8	32	Safe
3	Quickstep / "I Wan'na Be Like You (The Monkey Song)"	8	8	9	9	34	Safe
4	Tango / "Allegretto"	8	9	9	9	35	Safe
5	Viennese waltz / "I Put a Spell on You"	9	10	10	10	39	Safe
6	Rumba / "Wishing on a Star"	4	9	7	8	28	Safe
7	Jive / "Hit the Road Jack"	9	10	10	10	39	Safe
8	Samba / "(Your Love Keeps Lifting Me) Higher and Higher"	6	8	9	9	32	Safe
9	American Smooth / "Fly Me to the Moon"	6	7	9	9	31	Safe
10	Pasodoble / "James Bond Theme"	8	9	9	9	35	Bottom Two
11	Argentine tango / "Época"	8	8	8	9	33	Eliminated
11	Swing / "In the Mood"	N/A	N/A	N/A	N/A	4th/2 Points	Eliminated
11	Charleston / "Anything Goes"	8	9	9	9	35	Eliminated

== Awards ==
He was nominated in the top four for "Sexiest Male" at the British Soap Awards 2008, but was beaten by Rob James-Collier from Coronation Street. At the 2009 British Soap Awards, Maslen won in the Sexiest Male category, against fellow EastEnders actors Rob Kazinsky (Sean Slater) and John Partridge (Christian Clarke). He later went on to have a successful year at the 2010 British Soap Awards, winning both Best Actor and Sexiest Male. In 2011 and 2012, Maslen won "Sexiest Male" at the British Soap Awards.

== Personal life ==
He is married to Estelle Maslen (née Rubio), who is the mother of his son Zak Alexander Maslen (born 25 January 2001). The couple were together for nine years before they were married on 6 September 2008. Several of Maslen's co-stars were in attendance at his wedding, including: Samantha Womack, Rita Simons, Charlie Clements, Jo Joyner, Steve McFadden, Barbara Windsor, Patsy Palmer, Diane Parish and Perry Fenwick.

He is best friends with his former EastEnders co-star Samantha Womack, whom he has known since they were teenagers, and her former husband Mark Womack. He is also godfather to their two children, Lily-Rose and Benjamin Womack. Benjamin is also best friends with Maslen's son Zak.

Maslen is a keen carp fisherman, and has been involved in many charity events.

== Filmography ==
=== Film ===
Year	Film	Role	Notes
1999	How to Breed Gibbons	Stan	Short film
1999	Grand Theft Auto 2	Claude Speed	Short film
2001	The Bombmaker	SAS Captain Payne	Television film
2002	Capone's Boys	Sammy Cruz	

=== Television ===
Year	Title	Role	Notes
1999	Highlander: The Raven	Tom Ross	22 episodes
2000	Lock, Stock...	Jamie	7 episodes
2001	Peak Practice	Andy Reece	9 episodes
2002	Heartbeat	Alex Burton	12 episodes
2002–2007	The Bill	Phil Hunter	Series regular, 240 episodes
2007–2013, 2015–present	EastEnders	Jack Branning	Series regular
2011	EastEnders: E20	Jack Branning	1 episode
2015	The Royals	James Holloway	2 episodes
2020	EastEnders: Secrets from the Square	Himself	Episode: "Max and Jack"

=== Video games ===
Year	Title	Role	Notes
1999	Grand Theft Auto 2	Claude Speed	Intro sequence and trailer
2002	Reign of Fire	Quinn Abercromby (voice)	
