= Redemptive-historical preaching =

Method of Christian preaching

Redemptive-historical preaching is a method of preaching that emerged from the Reformed churches of the Netherlands in the early 1940s. The debate concerned itself with the question: "How are we to preach the historical narratives of the Bible?"

On one side of the question were the proponents of "exemplaristic" preaching. This method of preaching taught that the biblical narratives in general, and the Old Testament stories in particular, were to be preached as examples of how Christians today should (or should not) live their lives. Old Testament believers were held up as examples (or anti-examples, as the case may be, see for example anti-Judaism) of how we should conduct ourselves.

On the other side of the debate were the advocates of preaching that was "redemptive-historical" (the term used to translate the Dutch heilshistorisch). These included Klaas Schilder and Benne Holwerda. They argued that Old Testament narratives are not primarily to be moral examples, but as revelations of the coming Messiah. The narratives of the Old Testament served as types and shadows pointing forward in history to the time when Israel's messiah would be revealed in the person and work of Jesus. In support of this view, the advocates of redemptive-historical preaching drew heavily upon the text of Luke 24:27, where Jesus is teaching the disciples on the road to Emmaus: "And beginning with Moses and all the Prophets, he interpreted to them in all the Scriptures the things concerning himself" (English Standard Version). Further support was taken from verse 44 of the same chapter, where Jesus says, "These are my words that I spoke to you while I was still with you, that everything written about me in the Law of Moses and the Prophets and the Psalms must be fulfilled."

== Explanation ==
The Bible was seen, not as a collection of abstract moral principles, but rather as an anthology of the events of God's great works in history. The Bible was seen as the unfolding story of the coming Christ, progressively revealing more and more about him throughout salvation history. This, then, is to be the way in which the narratives are to be preached: with a view towards showing how the text points towards Christ.

The Biblical-Theological movement originated in Germany under the liberal teaching and writing of Johann Philipp Gabler, who emphasized the historical nature of the Bible over against an overly dogmatic reading of it.

Nearly a century later, Princeton Theological Seminary inaugurated its first professor of biblical theology, Geerhardus Vos. Vos was instrumental in taking the discipline of biblical theology in a more conservative direction, using it to vindicate the Reformed faith and historic Christianity over against theological liberalism.

Today, at least in North America, the redemptive-Jesus method of preaching has been carried forward through the work of Northwest Theological Seminary, Westminster Theological Seminary, Westminster Seminary California, Reformed Presbyterian Theological Seminary, Calvin Theological Seminary and Canadian Reformed Theological Seminary.

== Counterpoint ==
Opponents of redemptive historical preaching often fault this type of preaching as being weak when it comes to practical application of the Bible. They believe moral examples given in Scripture are undermined or diminished, and that redemptive-historical preaching can fail to challenge the listener to conduct consistent with Scriptural direction given in places such as Matthew 5-7, and Romans and other Pauline Epistles.

Advocates of redemptive-historical preaching do believe application is necessary. However, the main controversy surrounding this preaching method is the question whether or not using the characters of the Bible as moral exemplars for the believers today diminishes Christ as the center of the text.

== See also ==
- Biblical theology
- Covenant Theology
- Sermon

== Bibliography ==
- Clowney, Edmund (2002), Preaching and Biblical Theology, Philipsburg: Presbyterian and Reformed.
- Greidanus, Sidney (1970), Sola Scriptura: Problems and Principles in Preaching Historical Texts (doctoral dissertation), Kampen: Free University Amsterdam.
- Trimp, Cornelis (1996), Preaching and the History of Salvation: Continuing and Unfinished Discussion, translated by ND Kloosterman.
- Veenhof, C, The Word of God and Preaching (PDF), Auxesis, archived from the original (PDF) on 2010-12-27.
- Vos, Geerhardus (2000), Biblical Theology: Old and New Testaments, Edinburgh: Banner of Truth Trust.
