= Benne Holwerda =

Dutch theologian and biblical scholar

Benne Holwerda (22 September 1909 – 30 April 1952) was a Dutch theologian and biblical scholar. He was born in Marrum, studied at the Theological College of Kampen, and became a minister of the Reformed Churches in the Netherlands. In 1944 he left to help form the Reformed Churches in the Netherlands (Liberated) and served as Professor of Old Testament at the newly established Theological College in Kampen until his death.

Holwerda was an exponent of redemptive-historical preaching. He "staunchly opposed the moralizing and fragmentary use of the Old Testament" that he encountered. Holwerda believed that "salvation history founds and not only illustrates."

Koert van Bekkum and Eric Peels describe him as a "dynamic and creative biblical scholar". Holwerda had a significant influence on the American Old Testament scholar E. J. Young.
