= Herman Nicolaas Ridderbos =

Dutch theologian (1909–2007)

- Born: 13 February 1909; Hennaarderadeel, Friesland, Netherlands
- Died: 8 March 2007 (aged 98)

Academic background
- Education: Free University of Amsterdam
- Thesis: De strekking van de bergrede naar Matteüs
- Doctoral advisor: Frederik Willem Grosheide

Academic work
- Discipline: theology Biblical studies
- Sub-discipline: biblical theology
- Institutions: Protestantse Theologische Universiteit vestiging Kampen
- Main interests: New Testament history of salvation

Herman Nicolaas Ridderbos (13 February 1909 – 8 March 2007) was a Dutch Christian theologian and Biblical scholar. He was a New Testament theologian and worked extensively on the history of salvation (Heilsgeschichte) and biblical theology.

== Life ==
Ridderbos was born in Hennaarderadeel, Friesland, Netherlands. His father, Jan Ridderbos, was an ordained minister in the Reformed Churches in the Netherlands, a biblical commentator, and professor of Old Testament at the Theological School of the Reformed Churches of the Netherlands in Kampen. His brother, Nico Ridderbos, was also a professor, but at VU University Amsterdam, where he taught ancient history.

Herman Ridderbos studied theology at the Theological College in Kampen and at the Free University of Amsterdam. After graduating, he took up his first position as a pastor in Eefde-Gorssel in the Achterhoek region in 1934. On November 13, 1936, he earned his doctorate cum laude under Professor Frederik Willem Grosheide with a dissertation titled De strekking van de bergrede naar Matteüs (The Meaning of the Sermon on the Mount According to Matthew). In 1939, he moved to Rotterdam-Charlois to serve as a pastor there. On January 21, 1943, he became a professor in Kampen; he retired in 1975, and become emeritus.

In 1943, after serving as a pastor for eight years, Ridderbos was appointed to the post of Professor of New Testament Studies at Kampen. He succeeded Seakle Greijdanus who had been one of his professors. He served there for over forty years.

Herman Ridderbos died at home at the age of 98.

== Research ==
During his tenure as a professor, he wrote several theological books. In 1966, his most important publication, Paulus. Ontwerp van zijn Theologie (Paul: An Outline of His Theology), was published. One of his last major works was a commentary on the Gospel according to John. In his publications, Ridderbos placed particular emphasis on the salvation-historical character of the Gospel. This means that Christian salvation has entered the history of humanity; in theological terms, that het Woord vlees is geworden (the Word became flesh), meaning that God's Son (that is, Jesus Christ) became human.

Ridderbos exerted considerable influence within the Reformed Churches in the Netherlands. Thanks in part to his articles in the Gereformeerd Weekblad, he was also well known among ordinary churchgoers. During the conflict of the 1970s involving the Reformed theologian Herman Wiersinga regarding atonement, he defended the classical doctrine of atonement, which is based on atonement by satisfaction (the classical doctrine of atonement was articulated, among others, by Anselm of Canterbury, a renowned Italian-British theologian of the Middle Ages. This understanding of atonement is fully professed in the Reformed confession. Many Reformed believers see this as the heart of the gospel). Ridderbos regarded the Gospels as an account of what actually happened concerning Jesus and how Jesus revealed himself, rather than as the interpretation of certain early Christians.

In the ecclesiastical conflict over Wiersinga and the authority of the Bible, Ridderbos would have liked to see the Reformed Churches in the Netherlands remain united on a single orthodox line, but he later realized, to his regret, that they had sided with the then-Dutch Reformed Church—namely, that even within his own Reformed denomination, various religious views had come to coexist side by side. Nevertheless, he did not believe that his church had strayed into liberal territory, though he did believe there was a certain degree of departure from the orthodox Reformed faith.

His thinking also exerted influence abroad. Several of his books have been translated and reprinted in English, Spanish, Portuguese, Korean, and Indonesian.

== Works ==
These are his major writings in chronological order:

Thesis

- Ridderbos, Herman Nicolaas (1936). De strekking der Bergrede naar Mattheüs [The Tenor of the Sermon on the Mount according to Matthew] (PhD dissertation) (in Dutch). Kampen: J. H. Kok.

Books

- ————————————— (1941). Het Evangelie naar Mattheüs I [The Gospel to Matthew I]. Korte Verklaring der Heilige Schrift. Kampen: J. H. Kok.
- ————————————— (1946). Het Evangelie naar Mattheüs II [The Gospel to Matthew II]. Korte Verklaring der Heilige Schrift. Kampen: J.H. Kok.
- ————————————— (1946). Zelfopenbaring en zelfverberging. Het historisch karakter van Jezus' messiaansche zelfopenbaring volgens de synoptische evangeliën [Self-revelation and Self-concealment: The Historical Character of Jesus' Messianic Self-revelation according to the Synoptic Gospels]. Kampen: J. H. Kok.
- ————————————— (1950). De komst van het Koninkrijk. Jezus' prediking volgens de synoptische evangeliën. Kampen: J. H. Kok.
- ————————————— (1969) [1962]. Zorn, Raymond O. (ed.). The Coming of the Kingdom. Translated by De Jongste, H. Philadelphia: Presbyterian and Reformed. 556 pp.
- ————————————— (1952). Paulus en Jezus. Oorsprong en algemeen karakter van Paulus' Christus-prediking. Kampen: J. H. Kok.
- ————————————— (1958). Paul and Jesus: Origin and General Character of Paul's Preaching of Christ. Translated by Freeman, David H. Philadelphia: Presbyterian and Reformed. 155 pp.
- ————————————— (1953). "The Epistle of Paul to the Churches of Galatia". The New International Commentary on the New Testament. Translated by Zylstra, Henry. Grand Rapids: Eerdmans. [1968, 1970, 1976, 1981]. 238 pp.
- ————————————— (1955). "Israël in het Nieuwe Testament, in het bijzonder volgens Rom. 9 – 11". In Aalders, G. Ch.; Ridderbos, H. (eds.). Israël, 23 – 73. Exegetica. Oud- en nieuw-testamentische studiën [Israel in the New Testament, especially according to Rom. 9 – 11]. Vol. 2. Den Haag: Van Keulen.
- ————————————— (1963). 'Heilsgeschiedenis en Heilige Schrift van het Nieuwe Testament. Het gezag van het Nieuwe Testament. Kampen: J. H. Kok.
- ————————————— (1963). The Authority of the New Testament Scriptures. Translated by De Jongste, H. Philadelphia: Presbyterian and Reformed. 93 pp.
- ————————————— (1968). Gaffin, Jr., Richard B. (ed.). Redemptive History and the New Testament Scriptures. Translated by De Jongste, H. (2nd Rev. 1988 ed.). Phillipsburg, NJ: Presbyterian and Reformed. 91 pp.
- ————————————— (1957). When the Time Had Fully Come: Studies in New Testament Theology. Grand Rapids: Eerdmans. 104 pp.
- ————————————— (1958). Het verborgen Koninkrijk. Handleiding tot het Evangelie van Mattheüs. Kampen: J. H. Kok.
- ————————————— (1958). Matthew's Witness to Jesus Christ: The King and the Kingdom. World Christian Books. Vol. 23. London: Lutterworth Press.
- —————————————. Aan de Romeinen [To the Romans]. Commentaar op het Nieuwe Testament. Kampen: J. H. Kok.
- ————————————— (1960). Bultmann. Translated by Freeman, David H. Philadelphia: Presbyterian & Reformed. 46 pp.
- ————————————— (1960). Aan de Efeziërs. Aan de Colossenzen [To the Ephesians. To the Colossians]. Commentaar op het Nieuwe Testament. Kampen: J. H. Kok.* Authored by F. W. Grosheide.
- ————————————— (1977) [1962]. The Speeches of Peter in the Acts of the Apostles. London: Tyndale Press. 31 pp.
- ————————————— (1966). "Opbouw en strekking van de proloog van het evangelie van Johannes". Placita Pleiadia. Opstellen aangeboden aan Prof. Dr. G. Sevenster [The Structure and Scope of the Prologue to the Gospel of John]. Novum Testamentum. Vol. 8. Leiden: E. J. Brill. pp. 180–201.
- ————————————— (1966). Paulus. Ontwerp van zijn theologie. Kampen: J. H. Kok. 653 pp.
- ————————————— (1997) [1975]. Paul: An Outline of His Theology. Translated by De Witt, John Richard. Grand Rapids: Eerdmans. 587 pp.
- ————————————— (1967). De Pastorale brieven [The Pastoral Epistles]. Commentaar op het Nieuwe Testament. Kampen: J. H. Kok.
- ————————————— (1968). Het Woord, het Rijk en onze verlegenheid [The World, the Kingdom, and Our Embarrassment]. Kampen: J. H. Kok. [During the celebration of the 25th anniversary of his professorship in 1968, his colleagues presented him with a collection of a number of his articles and lectures.]
- —————————————. Tradition and Editorship in the Synoptic Gospels. Translated by Geehan, E. R.
- ————————————— (1971). Geehan, E. R. (ed.). In Jerusalem and Athens: Critical Discussions on the Theology and Apologetics of Cornelius Van Til. Nutley, NJ: Presbyterian & Reformed. pp. 244–259. 498 pp.
- ————————————— (1972). Die Psalmen. Ps 1-41. Walter De Gruyter.
- ————————————— (1972). Zijn wij op de verkeerde weg? Een bijbelse studie over de verzoening [Are We on the Wrong Way? A Biblical Study of Reconciliation]. Kampen: J. H. Kok.. Ridderbos was involved in a controversy about Herman Wiersinga's dissertation De verzoening in de theologische diskussie [Reconciliation in the Theological Discussion] (Thesis). Kampen: J. H. Kok. 1971. He wrote this as a response.
- ————————————— (1978). Studies in Scripture and Its Authority. Grand Rapids: Eerdmans. 109 pp.
- ————————————— (1979). Het Woord is vlees geworden. Beschouwingen over het eigen karakter van het Evangelie van Johannes [The Word Became Flesh: Reflections on the Unique Character of the Gospel of John]. Kampen: J. H. Kok.
- ————————————— (1992) [1987]. Het Evangelie naar Johannes. Proeve van een theologische exegese I – II. Kampen: J. H. Kok.
- ————————————— (1997). The Gospel of John: A Theological Commentary. Translated by Vriend, John. Grand Rapids, Cambridge: Eerdmans. 721 pp.
- ————————————— (1999). Jan Ridderbos. Mens. Kamper Miniaturen. Vol. 4. Kampen: Vereniging van Oud-Studenten van de Theologische Universiteit Kampen.
