= Groenekan =

- Village
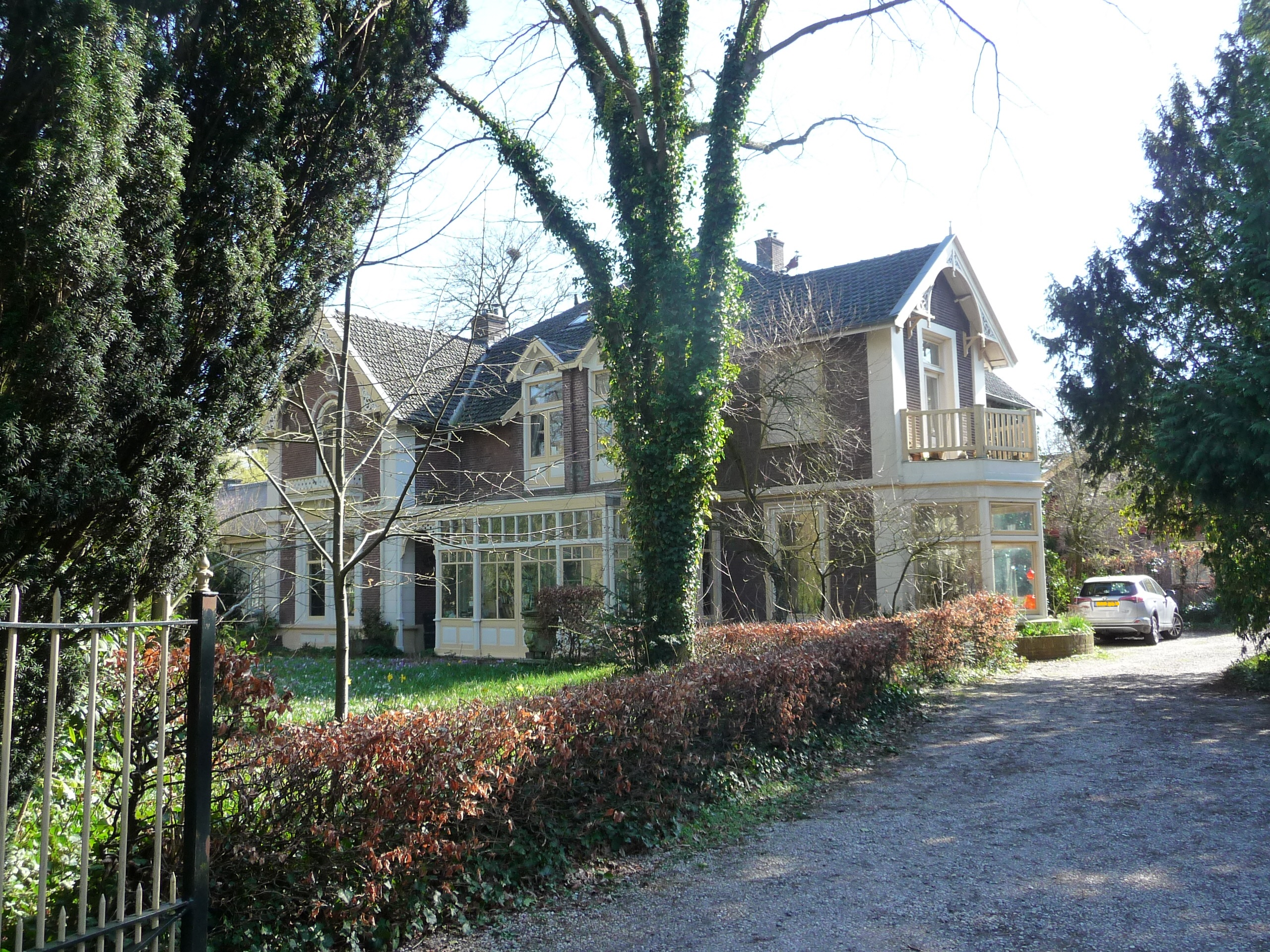
- Villa in Groenekan

- Flag

- Location in the Netherlands Groenekan (Netherlands)
- Coordinates: 52°7′27″N 5°8′56″E
- Country: Netherlands
- Province: Utrecht
- Municipality: De Bilt

Area
  - Total: 12.14 km^{2} (4.69 sq mi)
- Elevation: 2 m (6.6 ft)

Population (2024)
  - Total: 1,972
  - Density: 162.4/km^{2} (420.7/sq mi)
- Time zone: UTC+1 (CET)
  - Summer (DST): UTC+2 (CEST)
- Postal code: 3737
- Dialing code: 0346

Groenekan is a village in the Dutch province of Utrecht. It is a part of the municipality of De Bilt, and lies about 3 km west of Bilthoven.

== History ==
It was first mentioned in 1607 as De Groene Kan, and is a reference to an inn with a green pot as display. Groenekan was a road village in a peat excavation area to the east of the Vecht. In 1840, it was home to 237 people.

In 1863, Groenekan was cut in two by the Utrecht-Hilversum railway line. Two railway stations were built, but closed in 1922 and 1938. Between 1867 and 1870, two forts were built near Groenekan as part of the New Dutch Waterline: Fort Voordorp and Fort Ruigenhoek. Between 1914 and 1918, and 1939 and 1940, bunkers were constructed around the village.

== Gallery ==
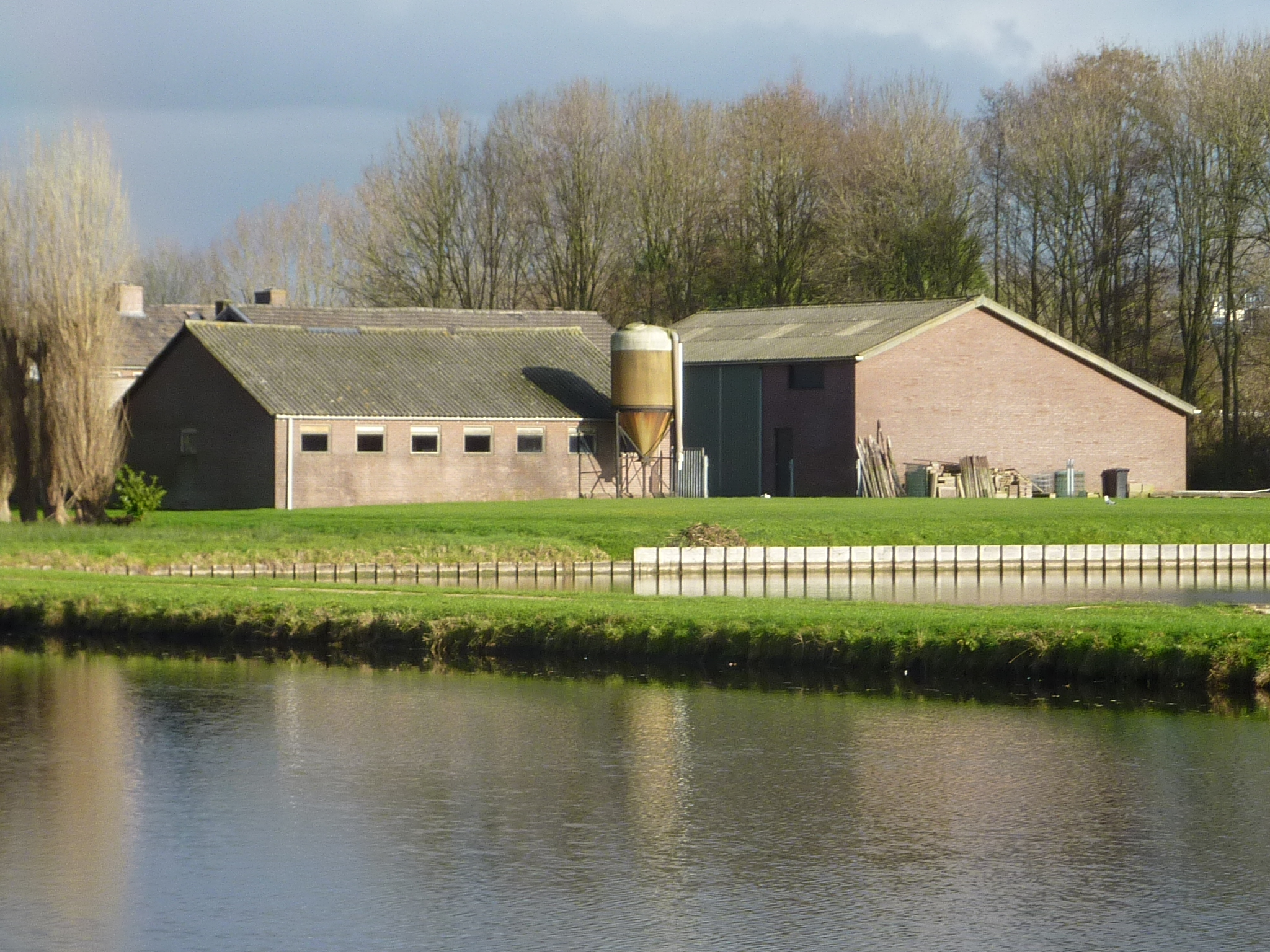
Farm in Groenekan

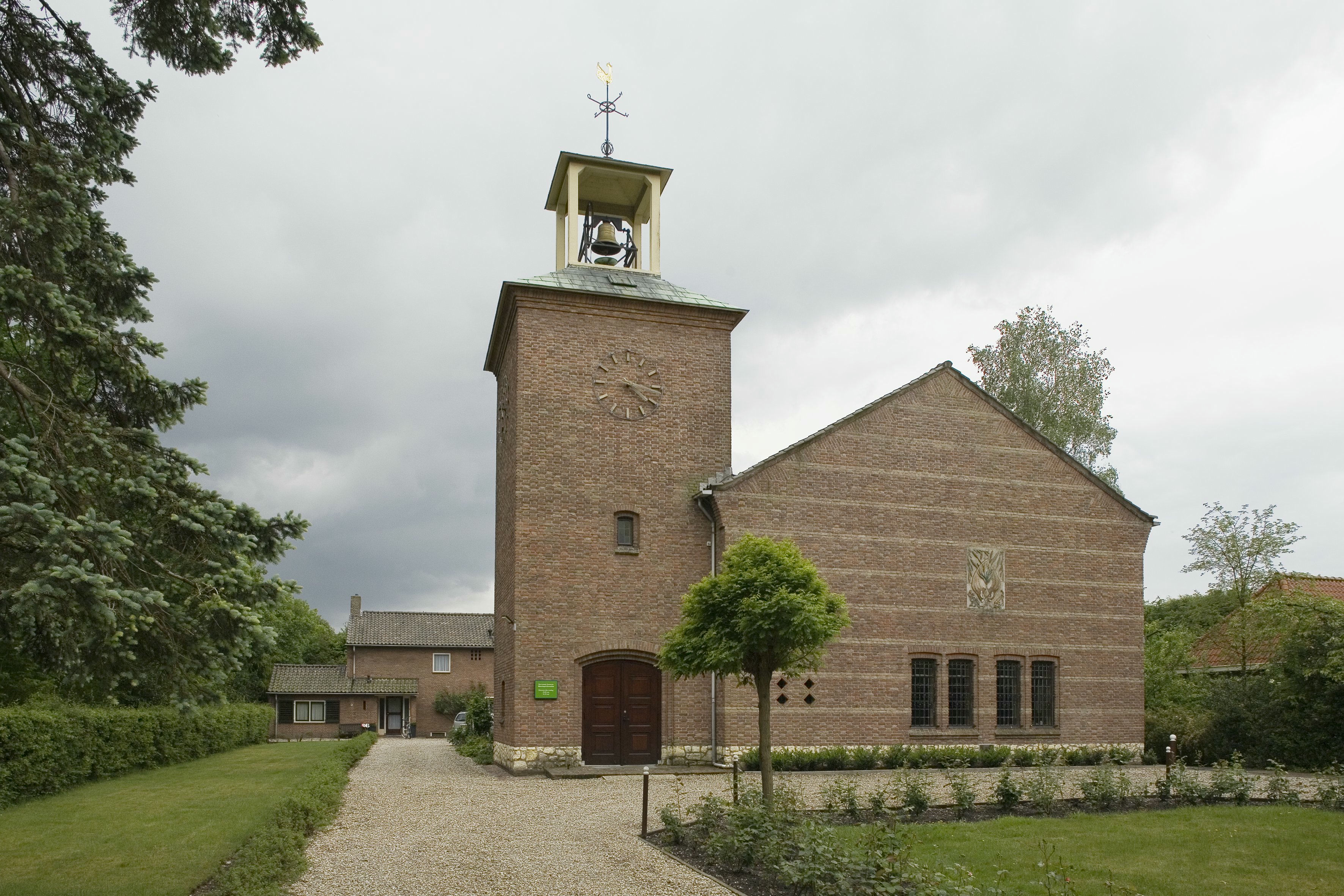
Church of Groenekan

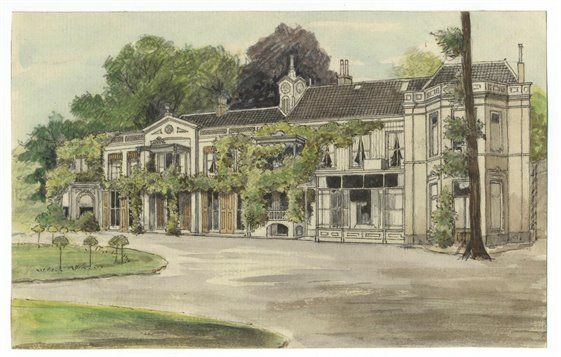
Huis Beukenburg (c. 1920)

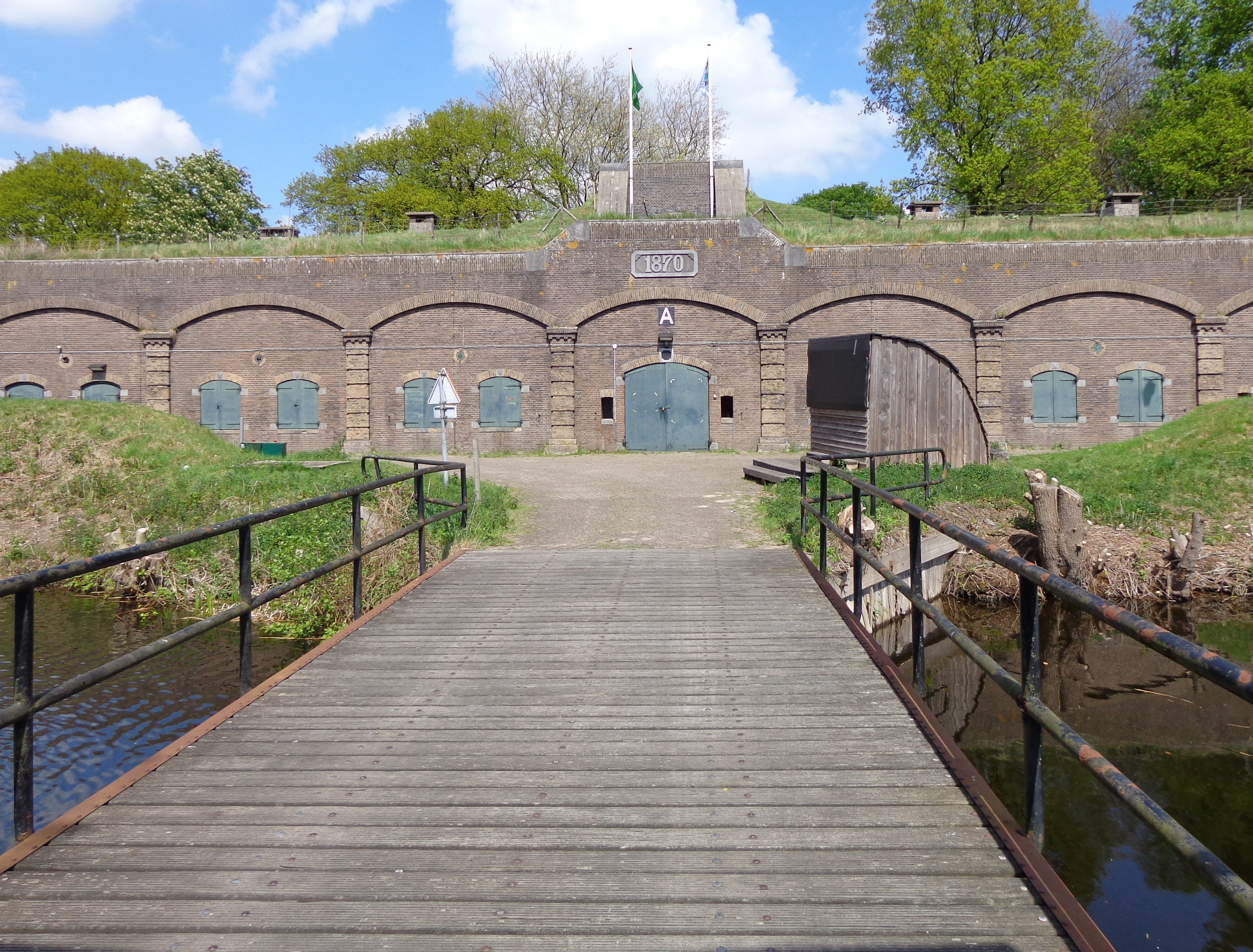
Fort Ruigenhoek

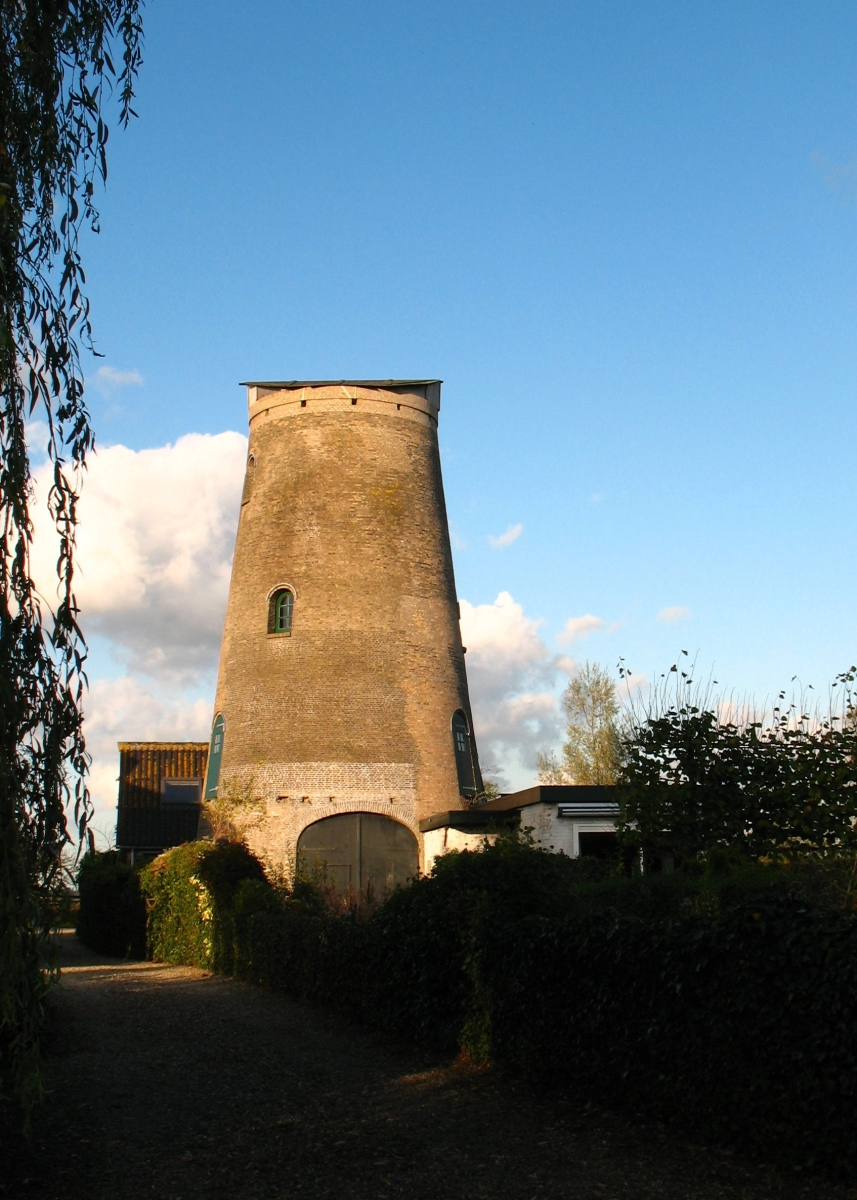
Windmill Geesina

== See also ==
- Rudolf van Reest
