= Jakob van Bruggen =

Dutch theologian and university professor

Jakob van Bruggen (born 23 September 1936) is a Dutch New Testament scholar. He served as Professor of New Testament at the Theological University of the Reformed Churches in Kampen from 1967 to 2001.

van Bruggen was born in Odoorn and studied at the Theological College in Kampen before becoming a minister of the Reformed Churches in the Netherlands (Liberated). He gained his PhD from the University of Utrecht.

van Bruggen edited the third series of Commentaar Nieuwe Testament, and wrote a number of volumes, including those on Matthew, Mark, Luke, Romans, and Galatians.

van Bruggen is best known in the English-speaking world for his 1976 book The Ancient Text of the New Testament (Dutch: De tekst van het Nieuwe Testament), in which he defended the Byzantine text-type) and for his 1978 work, The Future of the Bible (originally published in Dutch in 1975 as De toekomst van de bijbelvertaling). According to Theodore Letis, "No single book has done more to alert confessional Christians - who still regard the Judeo-Christian Bible as an authoritative text - that a wolf was in the sheep pen" than The Future of the Bible. In that work, van Bruggen "emphasized the critical role that the church has to play in Bible translation."
