= G.P. van Itterzon =

Dutch theologian (1900–1992)

Gerrit Pieter van Itterzon (11 December 1900 – 16 November 1992) was a Dutch theologian of the Dutch Reformed Church from Amsterdam. He wrote his dissertation on the Dutch theologian Franciscus Gomarus, on whom he published as well. In 1958 he became professor of theology at Utrecht University. He was one of the editors of the second edition of the Christelijke Encyclopedie (1956–1961), a standard reference work for the Dutch Reformed Church, and author of popular religious works.
