= Rikko Voorberg =

Dutch theologian (born 1980)

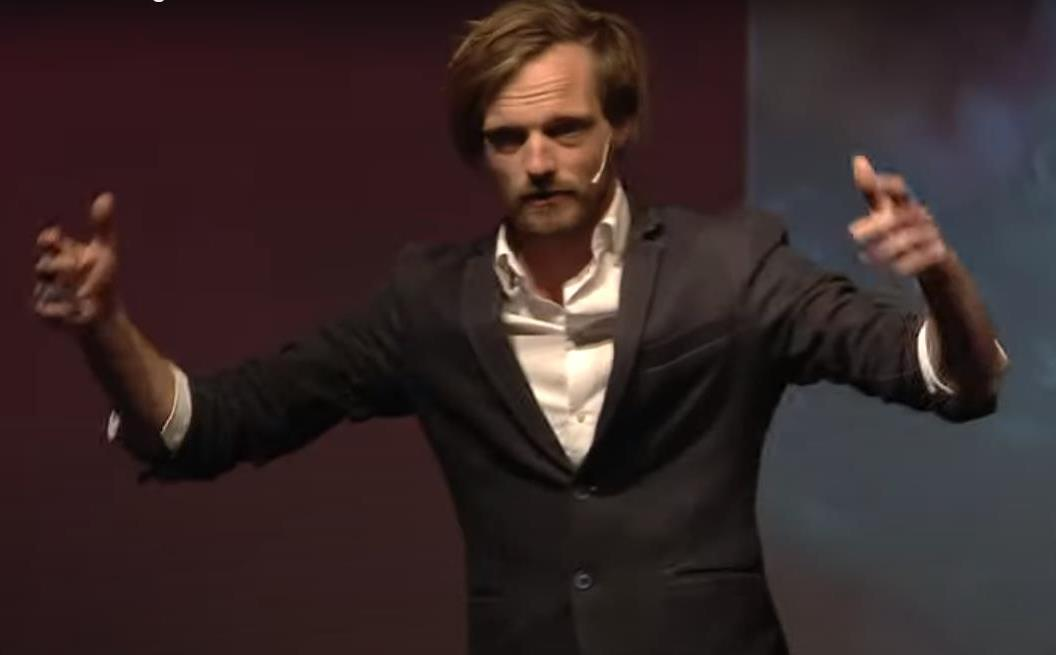
Rikko Voorberg (2016)

Rikko Voorberg (born 1980) is a Dutch theologian.

== Biography ==
Voorberg was born into a minister's family, the second child of Paul Voorberg, minister in the Reformed Churches in the Netherlands (Liberated).

He was educated at Greijdanus College in Zwolle, and then studied theology at the Theological University of the Reformed Churches in Kampen. He moved to Amsterdam and worked for a fledgling Protestant church, and in 2012 started an experimental religious theater group, StroomWest. Since 2013 he is in charge of the so-called "PopUp church", and writes columns for nrc.next and Nederlands Dagblad, and helped found the Vluchtkerk, a church organization in Amsterdam that supports refugees whose applications have been denied. That same year he hosted the EO-Jongerendag, an annual gathering of Christian youth organized by the Evangelische Omroep.

He made headlines in 2014 when he started a Facebook group (called "Benno L., welcome on our street") which argued for a "humane treatment" of a convicted child sex offender, which earned him both praise and threats.
