= Kerux =

Kerux: A Journal of Biblical Theology
- Discipline: Biblical theology
- Language: English
- Edited by: James T. Dennison, Jr.

Publication details
- History: 1986-2017
- Publisher: Northwest Theological Seminary
- Frequency: Triannually

Standard abbreviations
- ISO 4: Kerux

Indexing
- ISSN: 0888-3513

Links
- Journal homepage

Kerux: A Journal of Biblical Theology, previously known as Kerux: The Journal of Northwest Theological Seminary, was an academic journal of theology. The name came from the Greek word for "herald" or "preacher" (κῆρυξ). It focused on biblical theology in the tradition of Geerhardus Vos.

Kerux was committed to a position of exclusive redemptive-historical preaching. John Carrick argues that Kerux reveals a "striking emphasis upon the centrality of Christ and upon the believer's union with Christ," as well as a "striking lack of emphasis upon the need for repentance and sanctification".
