= G. Ch. Aalders =

English-Dutch scholar

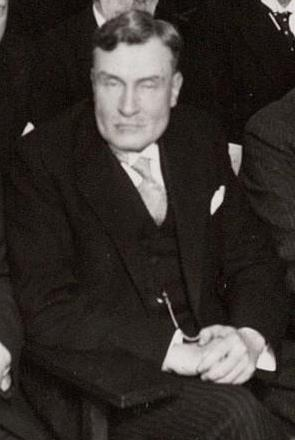
- G. Ch. Aalders in 1931
- Born: Gerhard Charles Aalders; March 25, 1880; London, England, U.K.
- Died: January 30, 1961 (aged 80); Heemstede, North Holland, Netherlands
- Citizenship: Kingdom of the Netherlands
- Education: Free University of Amsterdam
- Occupations: Author, professor
- Spouse: Maria Westerink (m. 1903)
- Children: 4
- Writing career
- Language: Dutch
- Years active: 1920s-1961
- Subject: Young Earth creationism
- Notable work: A Short Introduction to the Pentateuch

Gerhard Charles Aalders (25 March 1880 – 30 January 1961), usually styled as G. Ch. Aalders, was a Dutch Old Testament scholar. He was born in London to an English mother and a Dutch father. He studied from 1897 to 1903 at the Free University of Amsterdam. He served as a minister of the Reformed Churches in the Netherlands from 1903 to 1920, and as Professor of Old Testament at the Free University from 1920 to 1950. He was rector magnificus of that institution twice.

Aalders is best known for his books A Short Introduction to the Pentateuch (which I. Howard Marshall says kept him going during his student days) and The Problem of the Book of Jonah. He also wrote a number of commentaries in the Korte Verklaring series: Genesis, Daniel, Esther, Jeremiah, and Lamentations. He was an editor of the series "Commentaar op het Oude Testament" and wrote the commentary "Het Hooglied". He played a mayor role in creating the Dutch translation of the Bible of the Dutch Bible Society.

Historian George Harinck suggests that, along with Seakle Greijdanus, F. W. Grosheide, and Jan Ridderbos, Aalders "took the lead in Neo-Calvinist exegetical production." According to historian of science Abraham Flipse, Aalders introduced American-style Young Earth creationism into the Netherlands in the 1930s.
