= Northwest Theological Seminary =

Former Christian Reformed higher education school

Coordinates: 47.838026°N 122.287447°W

- Motto: His Story is our story
- Type: Private
- Active: September 15, 2000–2018
- Location: Lynnwood, WA, U.S.
- Campus: Suburban
- Website: www.nwts.edu

Northwest Theological Seminary was a theological seminary in the Reformed Christian tradition located in Lynnwood, Washington. It closed in 2018.

== Founding ==
Northwest Theological Seminary was founded in 2000 in Lynnwood, Washington. There had long been a desire to bring a Reformed theological seminary to the Pacific Northwest that would ably train men for gospel ministry. Northwest Theological Seminary was charged with emphasizing biblical theology in the tradition of Geerhardus Vos, presuppositional apologetics in the tradition of Cornelius Van Til, and orthodox confessionalism in the classic Calvinistic tradition. After a year of prayer and preparation by the board of directors, faculty, staff, students and numerous supporters, Northwest opened its doors at Lynnwood Orthodox Presbyterian Church in Lynnwood, Washington on September 4, 2001.

== Distinctives ==
The education of Northwest Theological Seminary was built on the following principles: the inerrancy of the Bible, the centrality of Christ, the biblical-theological method of teaching the Word of God, the presuppositional apologetics of Cornelius Van Til, the orthodox confessionalism of the classical Calvinistic tradition, and Reformed presbyterianism. The seminary's doctrine was firmly founded in the Bible and classic (orthodox) Presbyterian canons (the Westminster Standards and the Three Forms of Unity).

=== Academics ===
Northwest Theological Seminary offered two programs of study: the Master of Divinity (M.Div.) and the Master of Theological Studies (M.T.S.). The seminary published its own journal Kerux: The Journal of Northwest Theological Seminary that printed biblical-theological material in the Reformed/Calvinistic tradition.

==== Master of Divinity ====
The M.Div. was a 3-year program that equipped qualified men pursuing ordination with the necessary preaching and teaching skills and knowledge to begin their ministry. M.Div. students were required to learn methodology of Scriptural analysis and exegesis in the original languages, church history and biblical and systematic theology.

==== Master of Theological Studies ====
The M.T.S. was a 2–year program that presented a curriculum covering many aspects of scriptural analysis and exegetical work in the original languages as well as church history, and biblical and systematic theology.

=== Unique Model of Seminary Structure ===
==== Buildings ====
NWTS was somewhat unusual in comparison to most seminaries. The institution did not own any buildings, and had no plans to build. NWTS did not have a standard "business model." It did not seek any kind of accreditation but measured itself only on the basis of what it saw as its biblical mission.

==== Enrollment ====
Northwest Theological Seminary's enrollment was intentionally limited so it could provide ministerial candidates with "one on one" mentoring.
