= Reformed Presbyterian Church in Taiwan =

Reformed Presbyterian Church in Taiwan 基督教改革宗長老會
- Classification: Protestant
- Orientation: Reformed
- Theology: Conservative; Confessional; Calvinist; Evangelical
- Polity: Presbyterian
- Region: Taiwan
- Origin: 1971; Taiwan
- Congregations: 34
- Members: ~1703-2359 (year 2024)
- Tertiary institutions: 1
- Official website: http://www.taiwanchurch.org/rpct/

The Reformed Presbyterian Church in Taiwan (RPCT; Chinese: 基督教改革宗長老會; Pe̍h-ōe-jī: Ki-tok-kàu Kái-kek-chong Tiúⁿ-ló-hōe) was officially established in 1971 when the First Presbytery was formed as a result of the union of various conservative Presbyterian and Continental Reformed congregations planted by various missionary groups. Its origin could be traced back to the 1950s when the very first missionaries of those Presbyterian and Continental Reformed missionaries arrived in Taiwan.

== History ==
=== The 1950s and 1960s: Reintroducing Reformed Confessionalism to Taiwan ===
The Orthodox Presbyterian Church (OPC) started their mission to Taiwan through the Committee on Foreign Missions in March 1950 led by Rev. Egbert W. Andrews. In February 1951, Rev. Richard B. Gaffin, Sr. sailed to Taiwan from Shanghai, joined by Rev. John D. Johnston by October 1954. They decentralized their missionary efforts soon after they came, with Rev. Andrews carrying out his ministries in Taipei, Rev. Gaffin in Taichung, and Rev. Johnston in Hsinchu County. By the end of the 1960s, the OPC mission had planted 8 chapels and churches in 7 major cities in Taiwan.

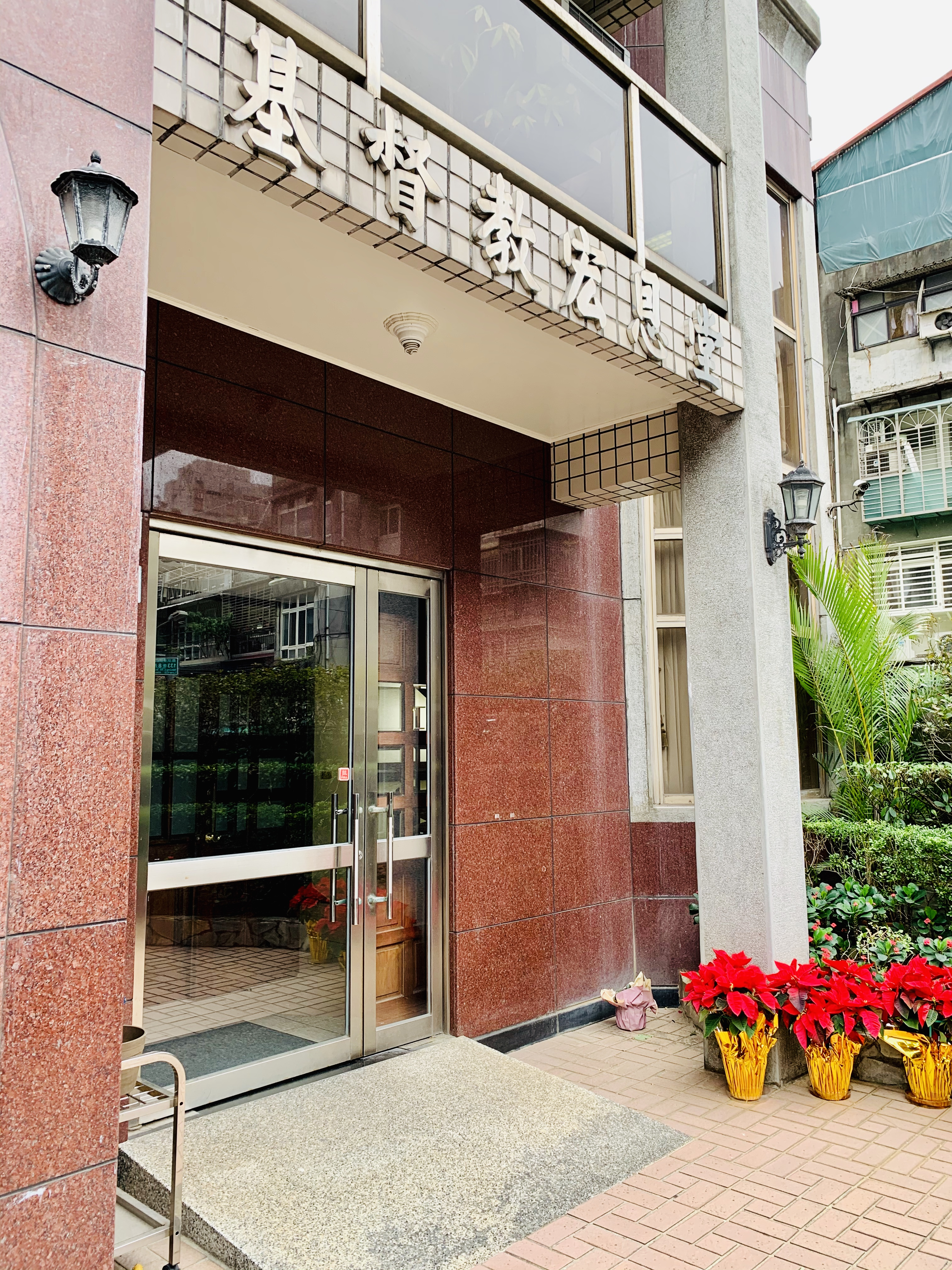
Hong En Tang Reformed Presbyterian Church

The Christian Reformed Church (CRC) began their mission to Taiwan after communicating with the OPC mission. Miss Lillian Bode led this effort and worked in conjunction with the missionaries of the OPC when she reached the island on 1 March 1953. These missionaries co-founded a Reformed Fellowship in Taipei, where regular worship services were to be conducted. In 1956, the Reformed Fellowship divided into the 2 groups that would later become the very first local Reformed Presbyterian churches in Taiwan around a decade later, i.e. Xin An Reformed Presbyterian Church (改革宗長老會信安教會; "Xin An" means faith-peace) and Hong En Tang Reformed Presbyterian Church (改革宗長老會宏恩堂; "Hung En Tang" means abundant-grace-congregation). The CRC sent their second missionary to Taiwan when Rev. Isaac C. Jen (任以撒) accepted the call to serve in the island by 1958. Additionally, Rev. and Mrs. William Kosten, and Miss Winabelle Gritter were also sent in a year or two. Meanwhile, the Calvin Theological Training Institute (CTTI) was established, and the number of enrolled students reached 9 in 1963. In 1966, Lillian Bode finished her missionary work in Taiwan and two more ministers, Rev. Mike Vander Pol and Rev. Peter Tong (唐崇平; the elder brother of the evangelist, Stephen Tong) were called to be missionaries to Taiwan.

The CRC missionaries founded 4 congregations with 290 members.

The Presbyterian Church in Korea (Koshin) from South Korea sent missionaries like Rev. Kim Yong-Jin and Yoo Whan Yon. They planted 11 congregations with 500 members.

At first the missionaries wanted to cooperate with the native Presbyterian Church in Taiwan (PCT) and did not seek to build their own congregations. There were unofficial joint projects between the missionaries and the PCT churches & seminaries. However the PCT was becoming increasingly liberal towards the end of 1950s and started to not adhere to Reformed standards. As a result, the missionaries decided to plant their own confessional Reformed churches.

On 1 June 1964, "The Presbyterian and Reformed Missions Council on Taiwan (PRMC)" was set up by five different missions. These were the Orthodox Presbyterian Church (OPC) mission, the Presbyterian Church in Korea (Koshin) mission, the Reformed Churches of New Zealand (RCNZ) mission, the Christian Reformed Church (CRC) mission, and World Presbyterian Missions which was the independent missions agency sent by the Bible Presbyterian Church (BPC). These missions also all worked together to establish the Calvin United Theological College in October 1966.

On October 31, 1966, the PRMC decided to found a new denomination that would be local, conservative, confessional, and reformed. And so, the beginnings of what would become the Reformed Presbyterian Church in Taiwan (RPCT) was born.

=== The 1970s to the Present: the RPCT's Founding, Split, and Reunification ===
The original or First Presbytery was formed on 1 March 1971, and became a self-governing church. However, there was a major split within the RPCT within only 4 years. The controversy was over the question of how long the missionaries would have voting power and what their roles were to be afterwards. Initially it was planned that the missionaries would have voting powers for 4 years, and then remain part of the RPCT as advisors. However some PRMC missions found this plan unsatisfactory, causing a split as a result.

The split would eventually result in some congregations joining and forming what would be the RPCT's Second Presbytery. Others became independent congregations, still others ended up closing down, and some congregations even ended up joining the PCT or Presbyterian Church in Taiwan.

After the split in 1975, only the CRC mission remained in the original or now First Presbytery. Initially, the First Presbytery still maintained regular meetings. But their meetings became more informal and infrequent as time passed. The First Presbytery meetings finally stopped in 1989. By this point most RPCT congregations had left the First Presbytery for either the Second Presbytery or other denominations, or had closed down, or had become independent. When all was said and done, only 2-3 congregations remained in the First Presbytery (which was not meeting) after the CRC mission left its ministry in Taiwan around 2004.

Meanwhile, the missions from the OPC and the Presbyterian Church in America (PCA) soon became involved and began working with the Second Presbytery (the PCA had since also arrived in Taiwan in the 1970s) . They were also joined by the mission from the Presbyterian Church in Korea (HapDong). However, the OPC and PCA missions would only attend the Second Presbytery's meetings periodically as observers. The OPC withdrew their ministry from Taiwan around the early 1990s. By then, the Second Presbytery was meeting regularly and routinely. However, not every one of their congregations maintained a zeal for practicing Reformed Confessionalism. As a result, some of their congregations have since stopped attending the Second Presbytery's meetings. The current moderator of the Second Presbytery is Rev. Henry Shi, the pastor of Village 2 Reformed Presbyterian Church.

The First Presbytery finally began experiencing revival when in 2008 a PCA pastor, Rev. Andrew McCafferty, became the moderator of the Hong En Tang Reformed Presbyterian Church. Led by the efforts of Rev. McCafferty and the Hong En Tang Reformed Presbyterian Church, presbytery meetings of the First Presbytery resumed around 2012. Most congregations that were part of the First Presbytery rejoined, bringing aboard their church plants as well. However some did not. Those congregations that did not rejoin included congregations that had joined the Second Presbytery after the First Presbytery had previously stopped meeting, congregations that had since dissolved, congregations that had since joined another denomination, and congregations that simply elected to remain independent. The current moderator of the reconstituted First Presbytery is Rev. Andrew McCafferty.

As of the present, the First Presbytery and the Second Presbytery maintain a very close relationship with each other. Both presbyteries are actively seeking to fully reunite and establish a General Assembly for the whole RPCT denomination.

== Statistics ==
Circa 2024, the church has 32 congregations, around 1703-2359 members, and 2 presbyteries. The majority of its members speak Mandarin, but Taiwanese, Hakka, and Austronesian are also used in worship. These churches are concentrated in the northern part of Taiwan around the cities of Hsinchu, Taipei, Keelung and Xizhi.

Many of the current ministers of the denomination were trained by China Reformed Theological Seminary (CRTS). Although the denomination does not directly run the China Reformed Theological Seminary (CRTS), they maintain a very close relationship with it, as most of the trustees of the Reformed Theology Mission Corporation (the board of directors of the seminary) are RPCT elders and or missionaries working with the RPCT.

PCA ministers (sent through the PCA MTW) and OPC ministers are leading several of the churches within the denomination.

The congregations of the 1st Presbytery (Original Presbytery) include:

- Hong En Tang Reformed Presbyterian Church (since 1966)
- Ren Ai Reformed Presbyterian Church (since 2014)
- Grace Church Sanxia (since 2016)
- Grace Banqiao (since 2018)

These are some of the congregations belonging to the 2nd Presbytery:

- Village 2 Reformed Presbyterian Church (since 1967)
- Nankang Reformed Presbyterian Church (since 1975)
- Yung-men Reformed Presbyterian Church (since 1987)
- New Hope Church Taipei (since 2003)

== Theology ==
The RPCT adheres to the Ecumenical Creeds, the Three Forms of Unity, and the Westminster Standards. However, due to the complicated history of this denomination, some of the churches within the RPCT are not strict about following these Reformed confessions of faith; this is especially so for the congregations who have lost touch with both the First and Second Presbyteries as time passed but still formally call themselves RPCT.

Unlike the Presbyterian Church in Taiwan, the RPCT does not ordain women to positions of elder or pastor, although women do serve as deacons.

== Affiliations and agencies ==
=== Educational and Theological institutions ===
==== China Reformed Theological Seminary ====
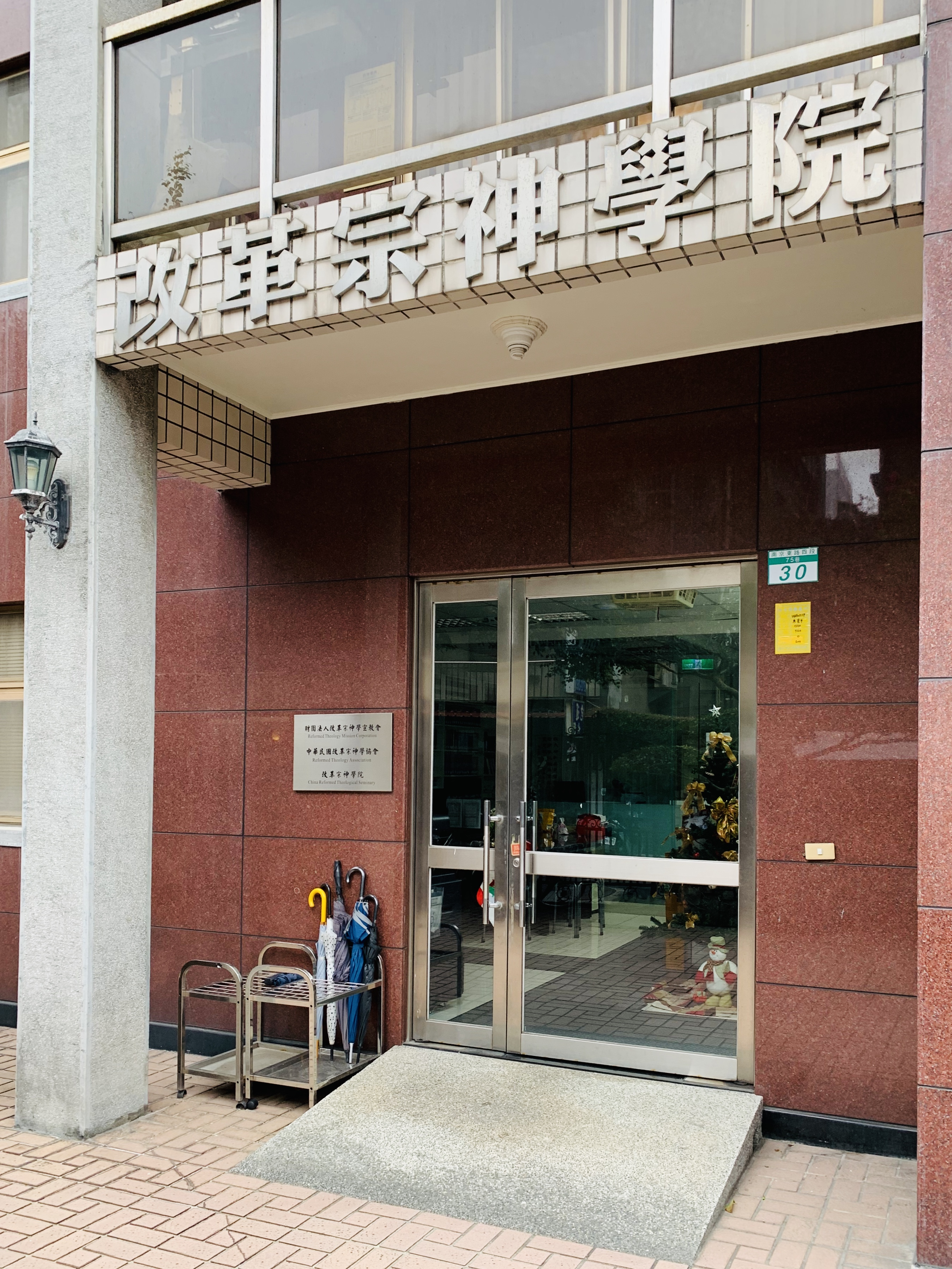
China Reformed Theological Seminary

CRTS is an ATA accredited seminary located in the same building as Hong En Tang Reformed Presbyterian Church. It was originally located in the NanKang Reformed Presbyterian Church and officially moved to its current location in 1996. It was found in September 1990 by Korean missionary Rev. Daniel W.J. Liu and several other ministers (including but not limited to Peter Tong, Daniel E.S. Tsai, David J.H. Lee, Xi-gang Feng). Rev. Liu initially served as the seminary's first president and became its dean 3 years later. Rev. Peter Tong was elected by the board to take over as the second president. The seminary was initially named the China Theological Seminary, later being renamed to China Reformed Theological Seminary in March 1991. Currently the board of the seminary includes representatives from several parties, including the Reformed Presbyterian Church in Taiwan (RPCT), the Reformed Theological Association (RTA), Presbyterian Church in America (PCA), Friends of CRTS (FCRTS), various overseas Chinese, and various alumni. Although small in scale (having only around 4 resident faculty, 65 on-campus graduate students, and 10 undergraduate students during its 2019 spring semester), it is the only confessional reformed seminary in Taiwan.

CRTS has hosted various visiting faculty from seminaries including but not limited to Westminster Theological Seminary, Puritan Reformed Theological Seminary, and Reformed Theological Seminary. These visiting professors have included the likes of Vern Poythress, Richard Gaffin, Terry Johnson, Tremper Longman III, Jeff Waddington, Sinclair Ferguson, Chad Van Dixhoorn, Adriaan Neele, Guy Waters, Jeffrey Jue, O. Palmer Robertson, Carl Trueman, Iain Duguid, and many others.

In addition to that, CRTS is also regarded as one of the global campuses of Puritan Reformed Theological Seminary (PRTS). PRTS is working with CRTS to provide PRTS in Asia, a ThM degree program, by Spring Semester of 2020.

==== Christ's College Taipei ====
Christ's College Taipei was found in 1959 by PCUSA member, Dr. James Graham. The school was donated to the PCA in 1981. Although the school has never had an official relationship with the RPCT, several missionaries working within the orbit of the denomination have served there as teachers and chaplains. The PCA's MTW also have sent missionaries to the school as well.

=== Parachurch organizations ===
==== RTV Taiwan ====
An online platform providing videos of sermons, teaching series, and lectures given by Reformed or other Calvinist speakers, like John Piper, R.C. Sproul, D.A. Carson, Tim Keller, Mark Jones, Sinclair Ferguson, and many more. The videos are subbed or even dubbed into Chinese.

==== Family Counseling Center (FCC) ====
The FCC is a counseling center established in December 2004. It aims to promote biblical counseling and its principles to the Church and to the general public. Many of the materials they are using come from the works of Christian Counseling and Educational Foundation (CCEF).

==== Taiwan Reformation Translation Fellowship ====
The Taiwan Reformation Translation Fellowship was formally established in 2007. However, it actually traces its roots back to the original fellowship found by Samuel E. Boyle and Charles H. Chao in the 1940s. Its goal is to introduce the depth and breadth of the Reformed faith to Chinese audiences. Translations mainly cover the works of the Reformers, Post-Reformation era writings, the Puritans, the old Princeton tradition, Neo-Calvinism's writings, and the contemporary evangelical reformed publications.

==== RTF Publishing Co. Ltd. ====
This is publisher of translated works done by the Taiwan Reformation Translation Fellowship. Its bookstore, White Horse Inn, is located across from the China Reformed Theological Seminary and Hong En Tang Reformed Presbyterian Church. It currently shares the bookstore with a cafe - Eternity Coffee Roaster. RTF Publishing Co. Ltd. also runs its own online bookstore, CrtsBooks and provides overseas shipping as well.

==== Reformed Theological Association ====
This association aims to promote both the theoretical and practical aspects of the Reformed faith to the Sino Christian world, as well as to support the work of the organizations like CRTS, FCC, RTV, RTF, etc.
