= De Reformatie =

Dutch Christian weekly magazine

De Reformatie ('The Reformation') was a Dutch Christian weekly magazine published between 1920 and 2015.

According to Sybrand Albertus Strauss, De Reformatie was intended to function of the mouthpiece of the "youth movement", which was "an effort of younger theologians targeting a spirit of self-accomplishment that had hindered the progress of the Reformed Churches." The first issue opened with the words "Through gradual transitions and catastrophic events we have ended up in a totally different world."

Valentine Hepp was the inaugural editor-in chief. Klaas Schilder became an editor in 1924, and sole editor in 1935. De Reformatie had a "policy of giving equal coverage to all of the different branches in the Reformed community", but when Schilder was deposed as minister in 1944 and formed the Reformed Churches in the Netherlands (Liberated), the magazine became the organ of that denomination. Cornelis Trimp served as editor from 1966 to 1992.

De Reformatie merged with Opbouw in 2015 to form OnderWeg.
