= Peazens-Moddergat =

- Village
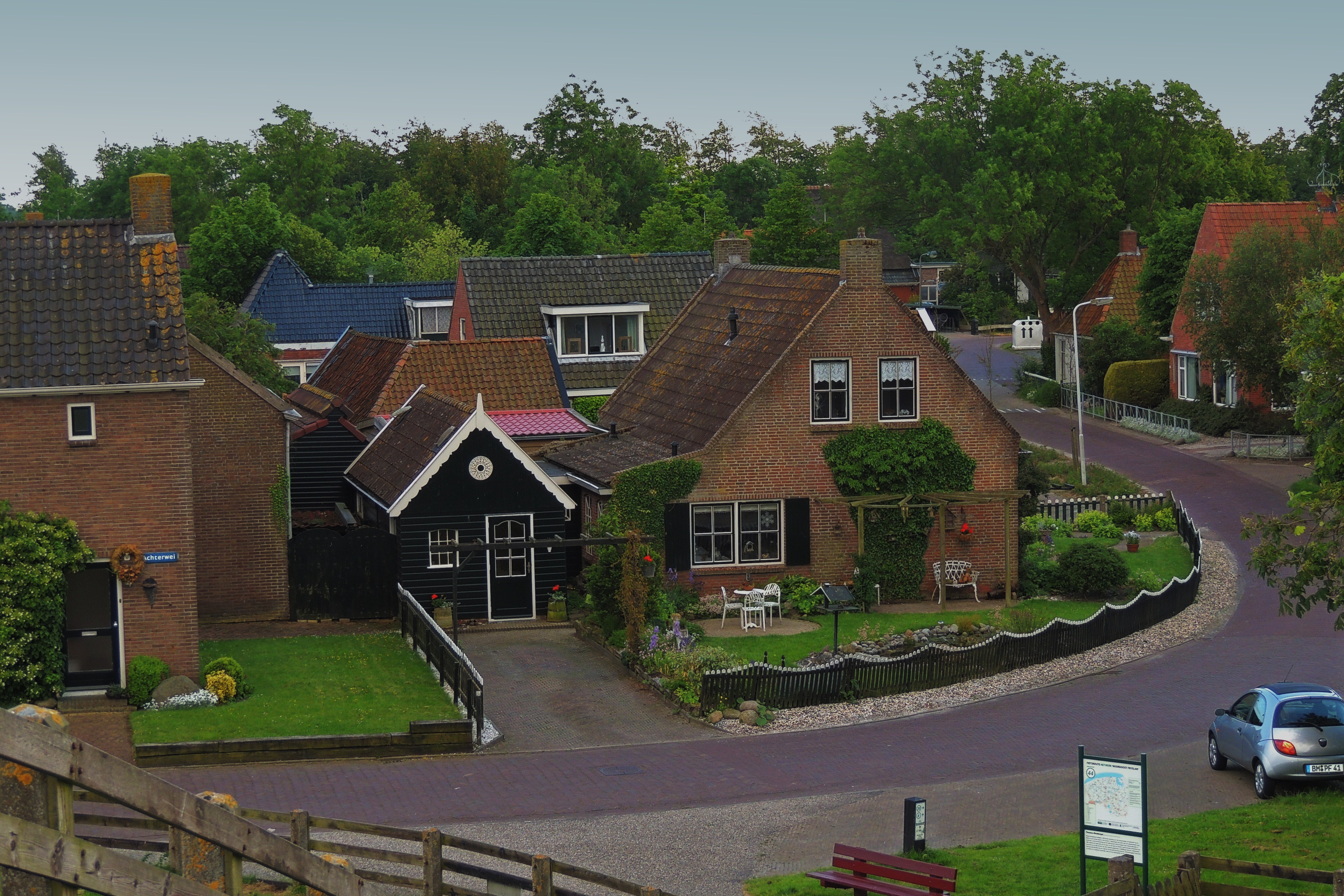
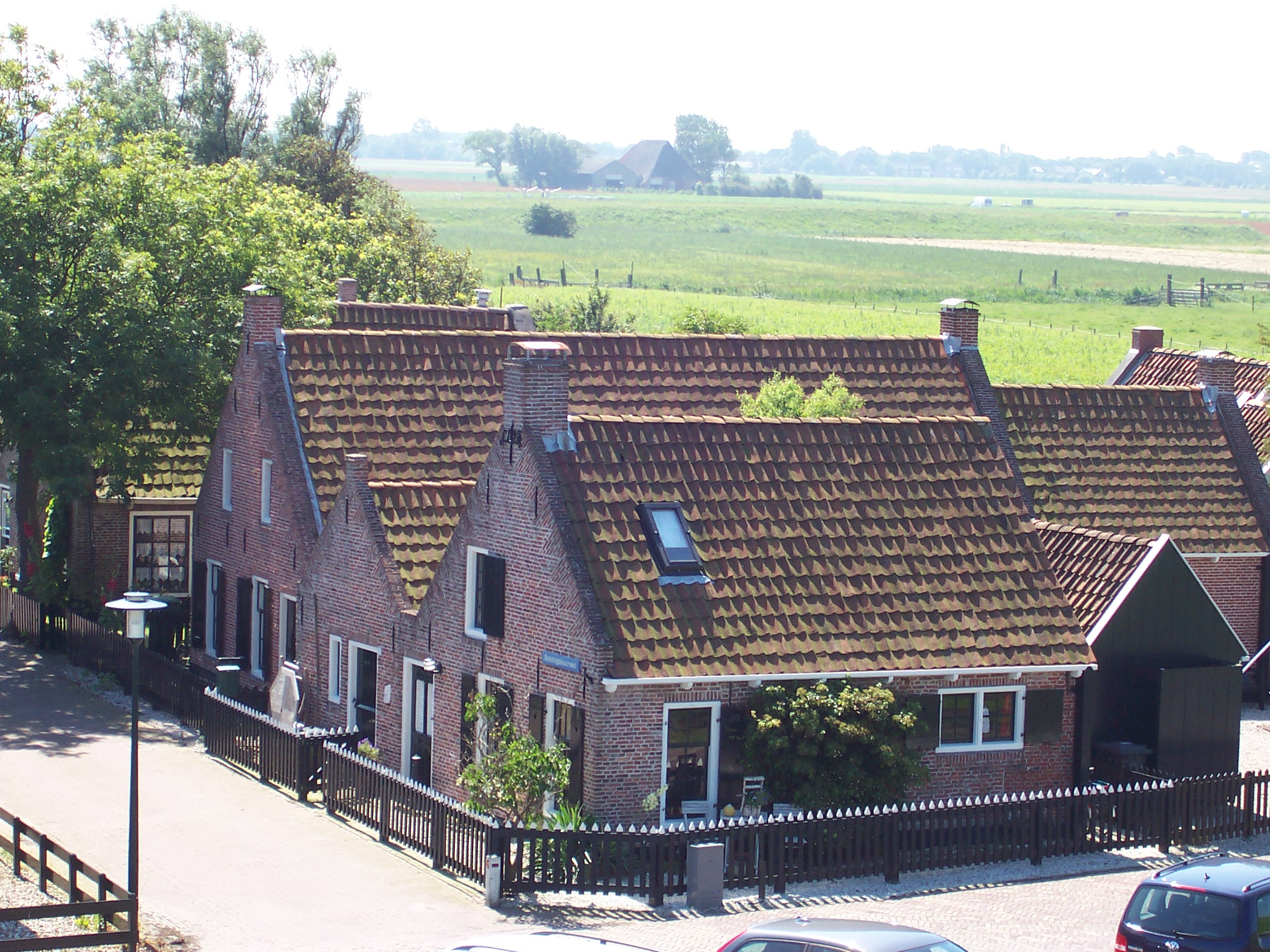
- Peazens (top) and Moddergat (bottom)

- Coat of arms

- Location in the Netherlands Peazens-Moddergat (Netherlands)
- Country: Netherlands
- Province: Friesland
- Municipality: Noardeast-Fryslân

Peazens and Moddergat are two adjacent villages in Noardeast-Fryslân in the province of Friesland, the Netherlands. They have a combined population of around 405 as of 2021. Officially both villages are separate, but they are twinned together with only a canal between them.

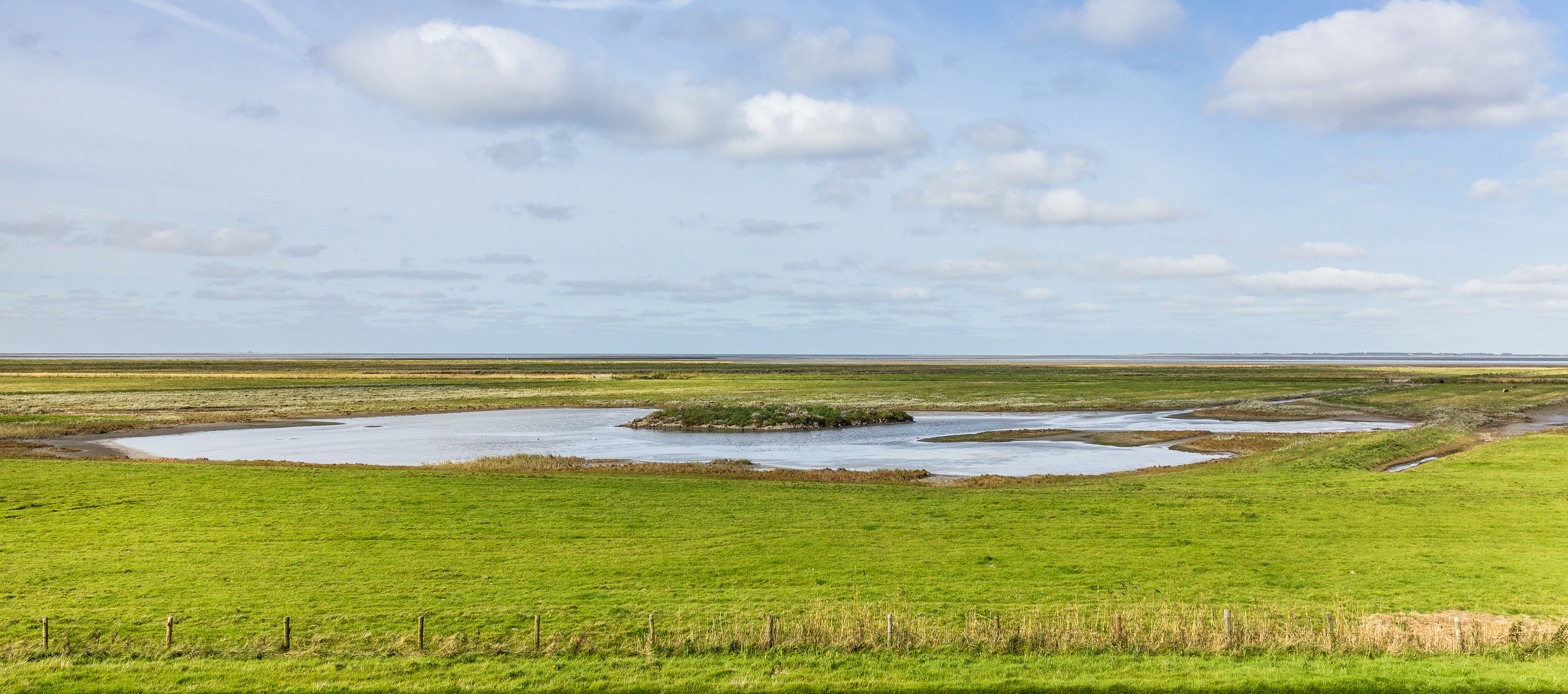
Paesens. Paesens. Dobbe (Little lake) behind the sea wall.
