= Christelijke Encyclopedie =

Dutch Reformed Church (and later ecumenical) encyclopedia

The Christelijke Encyclopedie is a Dutch Christian Encyclopedia which is published by the company J.H. Kok from Kampen, the Netherlands. The first edition appeared in five volumes from 1926 to 1929 with a supplement in 1931, under the redaction of the reformed theologian Frederik Willem Grosheide (1881–1972, father of the later secretary of state Hans Grosheide). A second edition, in six volumes, followed from 1956 to 1961. Both editions are reference works for the Dutch Reformed Church.

In 2005 a third edition appeared in three volumes under the same title, but the word Christian is treated from an ecumenical perspective. The authors of the latest edition include Jan Bank, Paul Cliteur, Bart Jan Spruyt, Gert Schutte and Kars Veling. The editor-in-chief was George Harinck.

== Editions ==
- Christelijke encyclopaedie voor het Nederlandsche volk, compiled under the editorship of F.W. Grosheide, J.H. Landwehr, C. Lindeboom and J.C. Rullmann. 5 volumes. Kampen: Kok, 1926–1929. Volume 6: Supplement and register, 1931.
- Christelijke encyclopedie edited by F. W. Grosheide [and] G.P. van Itterzon. 2nd completely revised edition. 6 volumes. Kampen: Kok, 1956–1961.
- Christelijke encyclopedie edited by George Harinck (chief editor), Wim Berkelaar and Lodewijk Winkeler. [3rd ed.]. 3 volumes. Kampen: Kok, 2005.
