= F. W. Grosheide =

Dutch Neo-Calvinist theologian (1881–1972)

Frederik Willem Grosheide
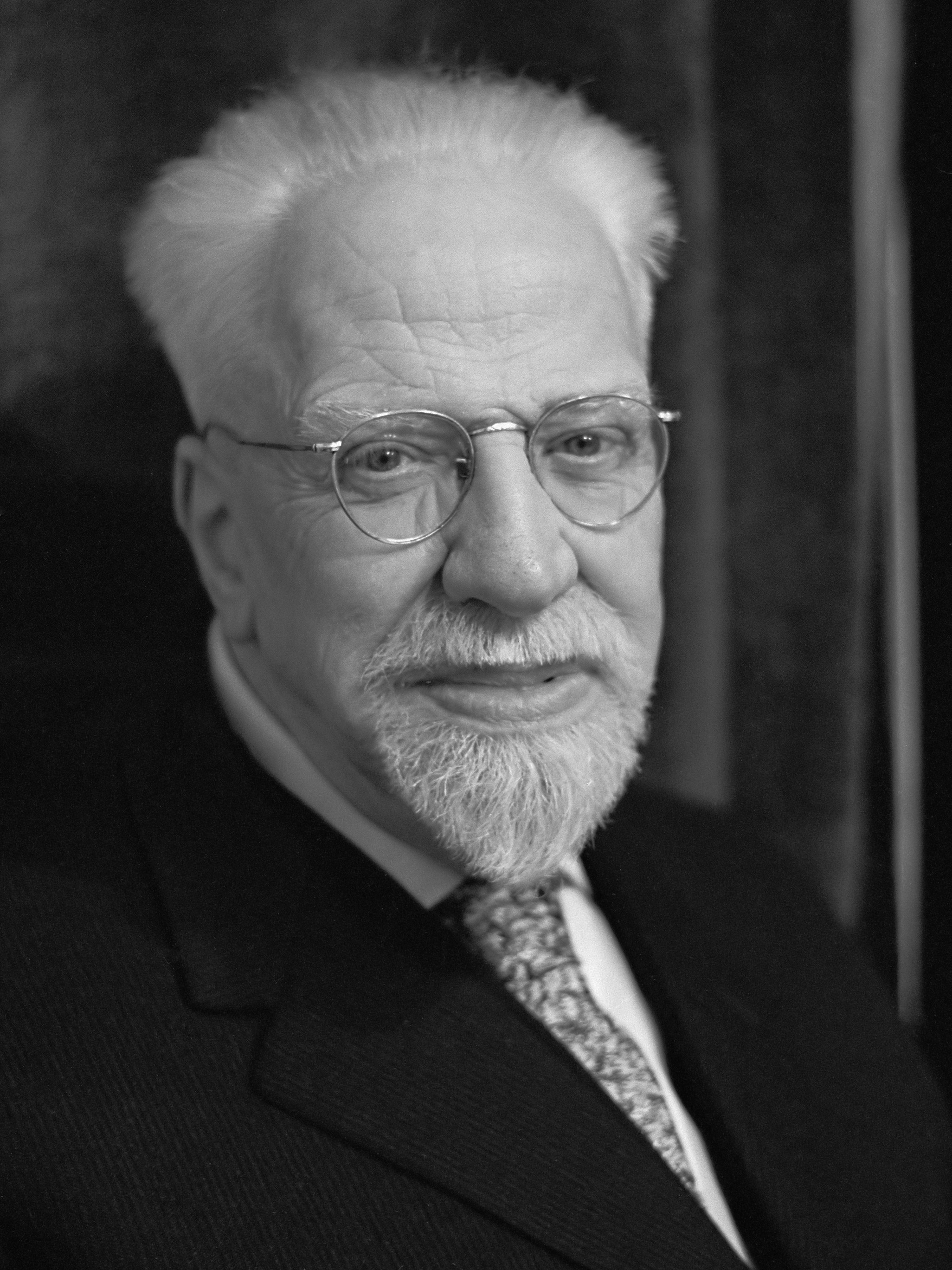
- Frederik Willem Grosheide (1961)
- Born: 25 November 1881; Amsterdam
- Died: 5 March 1972 (aged 90); Amsterdam
- Occupation: New Testament scholar
- Title: Professor of New Testament at the Free University
- Board member of: chairman of the Bible Society of the Netherlands

Academic work
- Discipline: Biblical studies
- Sub-discipline: New Testament studies
- Institutions: Free University
- Doctoral students: Herman Nicolaas Ridderbos
- Notable works: 1 Corinthians (NICNT)

Frederik Willem Grosheide (25 November 1881 – 5 March 1972) was a Dutch New Testament scholar. He served as Professor of New Testament at the Vrije Universiteit Amsterdam. He served as rector magnificus of that institution three times.

Grosheide wrote the original commentary on 1 Corinthians in the New International Commentary on the New Testament series. He also wrote a number of commentaries in the Korte Verklaring series: Acts, First and Second Corinthians, Hebrews, and the epistles of James and Jude. George Harinck suggests that, along with G. Ch. Aalders, Seakle Greijdanus, and Jan Ridderbos, Grosheide "took the lead in Neo-Calvinist exegetical production."

In 1951, a Festschrift was published in honour of his 70th birthday: Arcana revelata: Een bundel Nieuw-Testamentische studiën aangeboden aan Prof. Dr. F. W. Grosheide ter gelegenheid van zijn zeventigste verjaardag.

Grosheide was also chairman of the Bible Society of the Netherlands.

== Works ==
- Grosheide, Frederik W. (1922). Het Heilig Evangelie volgens Mattheus.
- ——— (1922). De brief aan de Hebreen; opnieuw uit den grondtekst vertaald en verklaard.
- ——— (1925). Christelijke encyclopaedie voor het nederlandsche volk.
- ——— (1927). De brief aan de Hebreën en de brief van Jakobus.
- ——— (1929). Hermeneutiek; ten dienste van de bestudeering van het Nieuwe Testament.
- ——— (1933). Paulus' eerste Brief aan de Kerk te Korinthe.
- ——— (1935). Algemeene canoniek van het Nieuwe Testament.
- ——— (1935). De brief van Jakobus.
- ——— (1939). Paulus' tweede brief aan de Kerk te Korinthe.
- ——— (1941). De Handelingen der Apostelen.
- ——— (1942). Geschiedenis der kerk.
- ——— (1948). De handelingen der apostelen.
- ——— (1948). Some Early Lists of the Books of the New Testament. Textus Minores. Vol. 1. Leiden: E.J. Brill. OCLC 237628.
- ——— (1951). Bijbel by Nederlands Bijbelgenootschap.
- ——— (1953). Commentary on the First Epistle to the Corinthians. New International Commentary on the New Testament. Grand Rapids, MI: Eerdmans. ISBN 9780802822574. OCLC 386407.
- ——— (1956). Christelijke Encyclopedie.
- ——— (1957). De eerste brief aan de kerk te Korinthe.
- ——— (1959). De tweede brief aan de kerk te Korinthe.
- ——— (1960). De brief van Paulus aan de Efeziërs.
