= Edward Joseph Young =

American theologian and academic (1907 – 1968)

Edward Joseph Young (November 29, 1907 – February 14, 1968) was a Reformed theologian and an Old Testament scholar at Westminster Theological Seminary in Philadelphia, Pennsylvania from 1936 until his death.

== Biography ==
Young received an A.B. from Stanford University in 1929, a Th.B. (the equivalent of an M.Div.) and a Th.M. from Westminster Theological Seminary in 1935, and a Ph.D. from Dropsie College in 1943. He was an ordained minister in the Presbyterian Church (USA) from 1935 to 1936 and then in the Orthodox Presbyterian Church until his death.

== Legacy ==
Allan Harman noted three things about Young's career. He "held unswervingly to a high view of Scripture," he was "deeply read in the literature of his chosen field" and he "dedicated his outstanding gifts to the service of Christ's church and kingdom."

Young was an advocate of single authorship of the book of Isaiah. H. H. Rowley noted, "Professor Young is a scholar who is widely acquainted with views he does not share, and his work is a vade mecum of views that he accepts and rejects; few will not learn from it or fail to find it valuable for consultation." The Evangelical Quarterly said of Young's commentary on Isaiah, "The special value of the book lies in the fullness and depth of the exposition and the erudition of the footnotes...These alone justify its purchase by the layman, the minister, and the student." The book was last published by Eerdman's in three soft cover volumes.

== Publications ==
- Old Testament Introduction (1949)
- The Prophecy of Daniel (Bible commentary, 1949)
- My Servants the Prophets (1952)
- The Authority of the Old Testament (1953)
- Thy Word is Truth (1957)
- The Book of Isaiah (Bible commentary, 1965–1972)
- Genesis 3 (Bible commentary, 1966)
- In the Beginning: Genesis 1-3 and the Authority of Scripture
- Isaiah 53: A Devotional Study
- The Way Everlasting: On Psalm 139 A Study in the Omniscience of God
- The God-breathed Scripture
