= Theological University of the Reformed Churches =

Academic theological seminary in the Dutch city of Utrecht

Theological University Utrecht
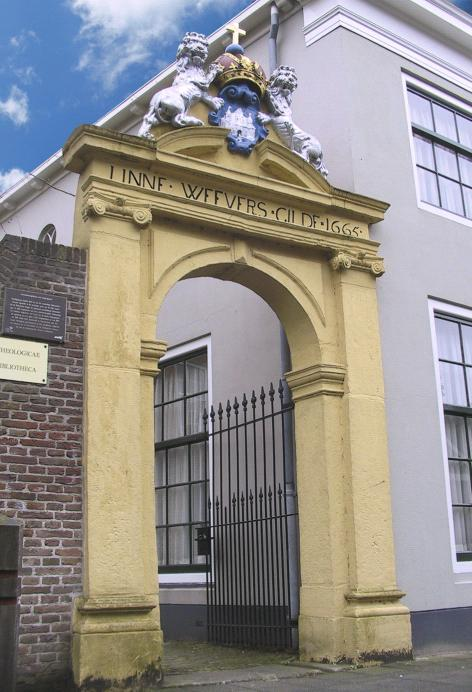
- Type: Seminary
- Established: 6 December 1854
- Location: Utrecht, Utrecht (province), Netherlands
- Website: https://en.tukampen.nl/

Theological University of the Reformed Churches (Dutch: Theologische Universiteit Kampen van de Gereformeerde Kerken) is an academic theological seminary in the Dutch city of Utrecht (formerly Kampen). It was founded on 6 December 1854 in Kampen.

The university primarily caters to ministerial education. In order to be an ordained minister in the Reformed Churches a six-year training including a Bachelor of Theology (BA) and Master of Divinity (MA) are required. Next to these programs the seminary offers one-year master programmes (MA) in several disciplines. Most MA-programmes can be taken in English. Since 2015 the university also offers a full English programme: Master of Intercultural Reformed Theology, which attracts International and Dutch students. Especially the MA in 21st Century Mission under the supervision of Stefan Paas is a popular programme. Academic research is carried out by the faculty, several post-doctoral fellows, and PhD-students. The doctoral course offered by the university is typically a four-year program.

== History ==
In 1854, a Theological School (Dutch: Theologische School) was founded by the Christian Reformed Church in the Netherlands, a church resulting from a schism in 1834 from the mainline Reformed Church in the Netherlands (Hervormde Kerk), to provide for education for its ministers. The name was changed to Theological College ("Theologische Hogeschool") in 1939.

In 1892, a large part of the Christian Reformed Church in the Netherlands merged with another group split from the mainstream Dutch Reformed Church to form the Reformed Churches in the Netherlands, which founded a new Calvinist university in Amsterdam: the Vrije Universiteit. This university also has a theological faculty, but the Theological School at Kampen remained a separate institution.

In 1944, another schism within the Reformed Churches in the Netherlands occurred, called the Liberation (Dutch: Vrijmaking), which resulted in the Reformed Churches in the Netherlands (Liberated). This new church also had a need for its own ministerial education institute, and so a new Theological College of the Reformed Churches (Liberated) was founded from parts of the Theological College. In 1986, both colleges became universities when a change in the Dutch university/polytechnic system was carried out.

Notable faculty of the seminary in the past include systematic theologians Herman Bavinck (1854–1921) and Klaas Schilder (1890–1952), and more recently the New Testament scholar Jakob van Bruggen (born 1936).

In 2021, the Minister of Education, Culture and Science approved the intention of university's board to move the study programs to Utrecht in process of establishing a Theological University there. The decision was followed by a positive advice from the Higher Education Efficiency Committee giving the board six months to make a final decision to establish the university in Utrecht.

== Notable people ==
- Benne Holwerda
- Rikko Voorberg, theologian and minister
