= Geerhardus Vos =

Dutch-American Calvinist theologian (1862–1949)

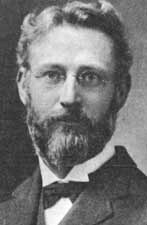
- Born: Geerhardus Johannes Vos; March 14, 1862; Heerenveen, Friesland, Netherlands
- Died: August 13, 1949 (aged 87); Grand Rapids, Michigan, U.S.
- Known for: Biblical theology, Calvinist theologian
- Title: Professor of Biblical Theology at Princeton
- Spouse: Catherine Smith
- Children: Johannes, Bernardus, Geerhardus Jr., Marianne (Radius)

Academic background
- Education: Calvin Theological Seminary Princeton Theological Seminary Strassburg University
- Thesis: Die Kampfe und Streitigkeiten zwischen den banu umajja und den benu hasim (1888)

Academic work
- Sub-discipline: Reformed, Biblical theology
- School or tradition: Reformed Biblical theology
- Institutions: Calvin Theological Seminary, Princeton Theological Seminary

Notes
- See title.

Geerhardus Johannes Vos (March 14, 1862 – August 13, 1949) was a Dutch-American Calvinist theologian and one of the most distinguished representatives of the Princeton Theology. He is sometimes called the father of Reformed Biblical theology.

== Biography ==
Vos was born to a Dutch Reformed pastor in Heerenveen in Friesland in the Netherlands. In 1881, when Geerhardus was 19 years old, his father, Jan Vos, accepted a call to be the pastor of a Christian Reformed Church congregation in Grand Rapids, Michigan.

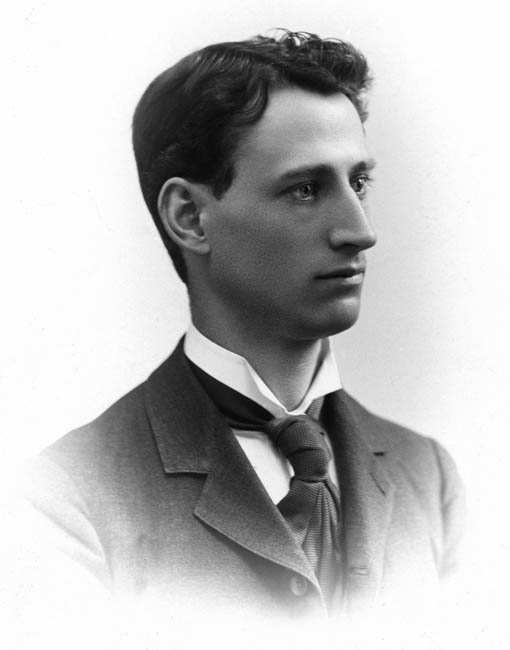
Vos while a young man.

=== Education in Europe and America ===
In September, 1881, Geerhardus Vos began his higher education at the Christian Reformed Church's Theological School, which is today's Calvin University and Calvin Theological Seminary in Grand Rapids, and his exceptional talents were soon recognized by the school, for he earned his bachelor's degree in a single year. During this period, Vos was appointed by the Curatorium to be the instructional assistant of Gerrit Egbert Boer, the teacher of the school as well as the president of the assembly. During the second year, Vos was paid as a lecturer alongside his studies.

In 1883, Vos was enrolled at Princeton Theological Seminary, and he had already mastered German, Dutch, Latin, French, English, Greek and Hebrew by that time. Upon his request, he entered Princeton as a second year student. His senior paper, titled "The Mosaic Origin of the Pentateuchal Codes", was awarded the Hebrew fellowship prize.

Vos carried on further studies at the University of Berlin in Germany in 1886. In April, he received Abraham Kuyper's invitation to teach in the Free University of Amsterdam as Professor of Old Testament, however he turned that down partly because of his father's objection. Almost at the same period, the Christian Reformed Church nominated him as a professor in Grand Rapids. Herman Bavinck also arrived at Berlin to meet Vos at the end of July, 1886, and encouraged Vos to study in the Kaiser Wilhelm University of Strassburg when Vos was considering transferring to a new school. Vos received his doctorate in Arabic Studies from the Philosophy Faculty of Strassburg University in 1888.

=== Career period ===
Herman Bavinck and Abraham Kuyper tried to convince Vos to become Professor of Old Testament Theology at the Free University in Amsterdam, but Vos chose to return to America. Thus, in the Fall of 1888, Vos took up a position at Theological School at Grand Rapids' faculty. He was installed as Professor of Didactic and Exegetical Theology at the Spring Street Christian Reformed Church in Grand Rapids on September 4, 1888. In his dogmatics lectures, he did not use the common textbook materials from Francis Turretin, John Calvin, or Charles Hodge, but developed his original work, Reformed Dogmatics which was published in 1896 in handwritten format. Vos' five volume Reformed Dogmatics were translated from Dutch to English by Richard B. Gaffin Jr. and others. The first volume was published in 2013 and the fifth volume was published in 2016.

In 1892, Vos moved and joined the faculty of the Princeton Theological Seminary, where he became its first Professor of Biblical Theology. At Princeton, he taught alongside J. Gresham Machen and B. B. Warfield and authored his most famous works, including Pauline Eschatology (1930) and Biblical Theology: Old and New Testaments (1948). Despite his opposition to the growing modernist influence at Princeton in the late 1920s, he decided to remain at Princeton Seminary after Machen left to form Westminster Theological Seminary, as he was close to retirement. Nevertheless, D. Clair Davis calls Vos "a great guiding spirit at Westminster." Vos retired to California in 1932, three years after the formation of Westminster.

In 1894, Vos married Catherine Smith. Known for being the author of The Children's Story Bible, she died in 1937. They had three sons and one daughter. One of their sons, Johannes G. Vos (1903-1983), studied at Princeton Theological Seminary and became ordained in the Reformed Presbyterian Church of North America, and was also a professor at Geneva College in Pennsylvania.

=== After retirement ===
After retirement from Princeton, Vos remained in the Presbyterian Church (USA), whereas his wife (Catherine) and their two sons, Geerhardus Jr. and Johannes together with Johannes' wife, Marian, joined the Reformed Presbyterian Church of North America. His daughter, Marianne, joined the Christian Reformed Church in North America with her husband, William Radius. Bernardus Vos joined Gresham Machen's newly formed church, which was later renamed as the Orthodox Presbyterian Church in 1939.

On August 13, 1949, Vos died in Hessel Convalescent Hospital in Grand Rapids, Michigan. A funeral service was conducted by H. Henry Meeter in Zaagman Chapel in Calvin College two days later. Vos' body was then buried in the tiny village of Roaring Branch, Pennsylvania on Wednesday, August 17, 1949. For his burial, very few people turned out. Only two family members, Bernardus and Geerhardus Jr., a man and a woman from the local Methodist Church, and two ministers from the Orthodox Presbyterian Church, John De Waard and Cornelius Van Til were present. Van Til preached from 2 Corinthians 5:1 at the burial service. No one was there from his denomination and from the institution he had served for nearly 40 years.

== Works ==
=== Books ===
- Vos, Geerhardus (1886). The Mosaic Origin of the Pentateuchal Codes. New York: A. C. Armstrong & Son. OCLC 3144180.
- ——— (1894). The Idea of Biblical Theology as a Science and as a Theological Discipline: The Inauguration Of the Rev. Geerhardus Vos, Ph.D., D.D., as Professor Of Biblical Theology. New York: A. D. F. Randolph. OCLC 8838483.
- ——— (1903). The Teaching of Jesus Concerning the Kingdom of God and the Church. New York: American Tract Society. OCLC 3919537.
- ——— (1922). Grace and Glory: sermons preached in the chapel of Princeton Theological Seminary. Grand Rapids, MI: Reformed Press. OCLC 4995486.
- ——— (1926). The Self-Disclosure of Jesus: The Modern Debate about the Messianic Consciousness. New York: George H. Doran Co. OCLC 2430774.
- ——— (1930). The Pauline Eschatology. Grand Rapids, MI: Baker Book House. OCLC 697175240.
- ——— (1931). Charis, English Verses. Princeton, NJ: Princeton Theological Seminary.
- ——— (1933). Western Rhymes. Princeton, NJ: Princeton Theological Seminary.
- ——— (1934). Biblical Theology: Old and New Testaments. Philadelphia, PA: Theological Seminary of the Reformed Episcopal Church. OCLC 66323285.
- ——— (1944). The Teaching of the Epistle to the Hebrews. Philadelphia, PA: Theological Seminary of the Reformed Episcopal Church. OCLC 5971869.

Published posthumously

- ——— (2001). The Eschatology of the Old Testament Phillipsburg, NJ. P&R Publishing. ISBN 9780875521817. OCLC 45888861.
- ——— (1980). Redemptive History and Biblical Interpretation: The Shorter Writings of Geerhardus Vos. Phillipsburg, NJ: P&R Publishing. ISBN 9780875522708. OCLC 6968978.
- ——— (2013). The Collected Reviews of Geerhardus Vos. Bellingham, WA: Lexham Press.
- ——— (2013). The Collected Articles of Geerhardus Vos. Bellingham, WA: Lexham Press.
- ——— (2013). The Collected Dictionary Articles of Geerhardus Vos. Bellingham, WA: Lexham Press.
- ——— (2013). Reformed Dogmatics: Volume 1 - Theology Proper. Translated by Gaffin, Richard B. Bellingham, WA: Lexham Press.
- ——— (2014). Reformed Dogmatics: Volume 2 - Anthropology. Translated by Gaffin, Richard B. Bellingham, WA: Lexham Press.
- ——— (2015). Reformed Dogmatics: Volume 3 - Christology. Translated by Gaffin, Richard B. Bellingham, WA: Lexham Press.
- ——— (2015). Reformed Dogmatics: Volume 4 - Soteriology. Translated by Gaffin, Richard B. Bellingham, WA: Lexham Press.
- ——— (2016). Reformed Dogmatics: Volume 5 - Ecclesiology, the Means of Grace, Eschatology. Translated by Gaffin, Richard B. Bellingham, WA: Lexham Press.

=== Journal articles ===
- ——— (1902). "The Scriptural Doctrine of the Love of God". The Presbyterian and Reformed Review. 13: 1–37.
- ——— (1928). "Jeremiah's Plaint and its Answer". The Princeton Theological Review. 26: 48l–495.
- "The Nature and Aims of Biblical Theology". Kerux: The Journal of Northwest Theological Seminary. 14 (1). May 1999.
