= Potential Royal Marine Course =

Royal Marines selection course

The Potential Royal Marines Course, often abbreviated to PRMC, was a Royal Marines selection course for Potential Recruits. The course was held at the Commando Training Centre Royal Marines, and was designed to assess a candidate's suitability for entry into the Royal Marines. The course in no longer held having been replaced by the Candidate Preparation Course (CPC).

== Day 1 ==
Candidates arrived at the centre and receive clothing, boots and a PRMC briefing, before being shown around the facilities relevant to the course.

== Day 2 ==
Candidates were instructed in basic drill techniques, before participating in a series of gym tests as part of the Royal Marines Fitness Assessment (RMFA). There are four main physical criteria that must be completed in the gym. Each is marked out of 5 points and candidates must achieve a minimum of 16 points across the 6 elements (including the timed assault course and 1.5 mile run). These are:

- The VO2 Max bleep test: A minimum pass score of 11 is required to stay on the course. The more shuttles completed beyond level 11, the more points earned.
- Press-ups: Candidates are required to perform as many press-ups as possible over the course of two minutes. Press-ups are conducted in time with audible beeps to ensure correct form and muscle tension. Maximum points are awarded for achieving 60 press-ups in the two minute period.
- Sit-ups: As with the press-ups, candidates are required to attempt as many sit-ups as possible in 2 minutes. These are also carried out to a timed bleep. Performing 85 sit-ups in the two minutes will earn the maximum points.
- Pull-ups: Overhand-grasp pull-ups are carried out on a wooden beam to a timed bleep. A minimum of 3 pull-ups are required to continue the course, though candidates are encouraged to target at least 8. Maximum points are to be awarded for 16 successful pull-ups.

Following the gym tests a series of interactive lectures are given. Candidates will then commence a 1.5 mile run as a group, to be run within 12.5 minutes, followed by a second 1.5 mile run, to be run as fast as possible under a minimum of 11 minutes and 15 seconds. These runs are undertaken outside and are scored out of 5, contributing to the overall score.

After the run, a short swimming assessment was carried out. This is the final assessment of the day and involves candidates jumping off a high diving board (3m) and swimming two 100m lengths. Candidates also must retrieve a rubber brick from the bottom of the pool's deep end. Candidates who struggle in this test will be considered weak swimmers and advised on how to improve ahead of Basic Training.

== Day 3 ==
During the third day candidates completed:

- The "Tarzan Assault Course," which involves navigating across ladders, ropes and obstacles up to 30 feet above the ground.
- The bottom field assault course which includes team games and arduous physical activities designed to test determination and motivation.
- An endurance course lasting 90 minutes and covering 2.5 miles undertaken on Woodbury Common. Later, candidates march behind an instructor for a mile, before running four miles back to the training centre.
- An over-night exercise which is intended to promote team building. Candidates are expected to work with each other to prepare food and shelter.

== Day 4 ==
On the fourth day candidates received a lecture from a Physical Training Instructor, a medical briefing and a pay briefing. Candidates are then told if they have passed or not, before receiving relevant certificates and departing the training centre.
