= Protestant Theological University =

Theological university with locations in the Dutch city of Utrecht

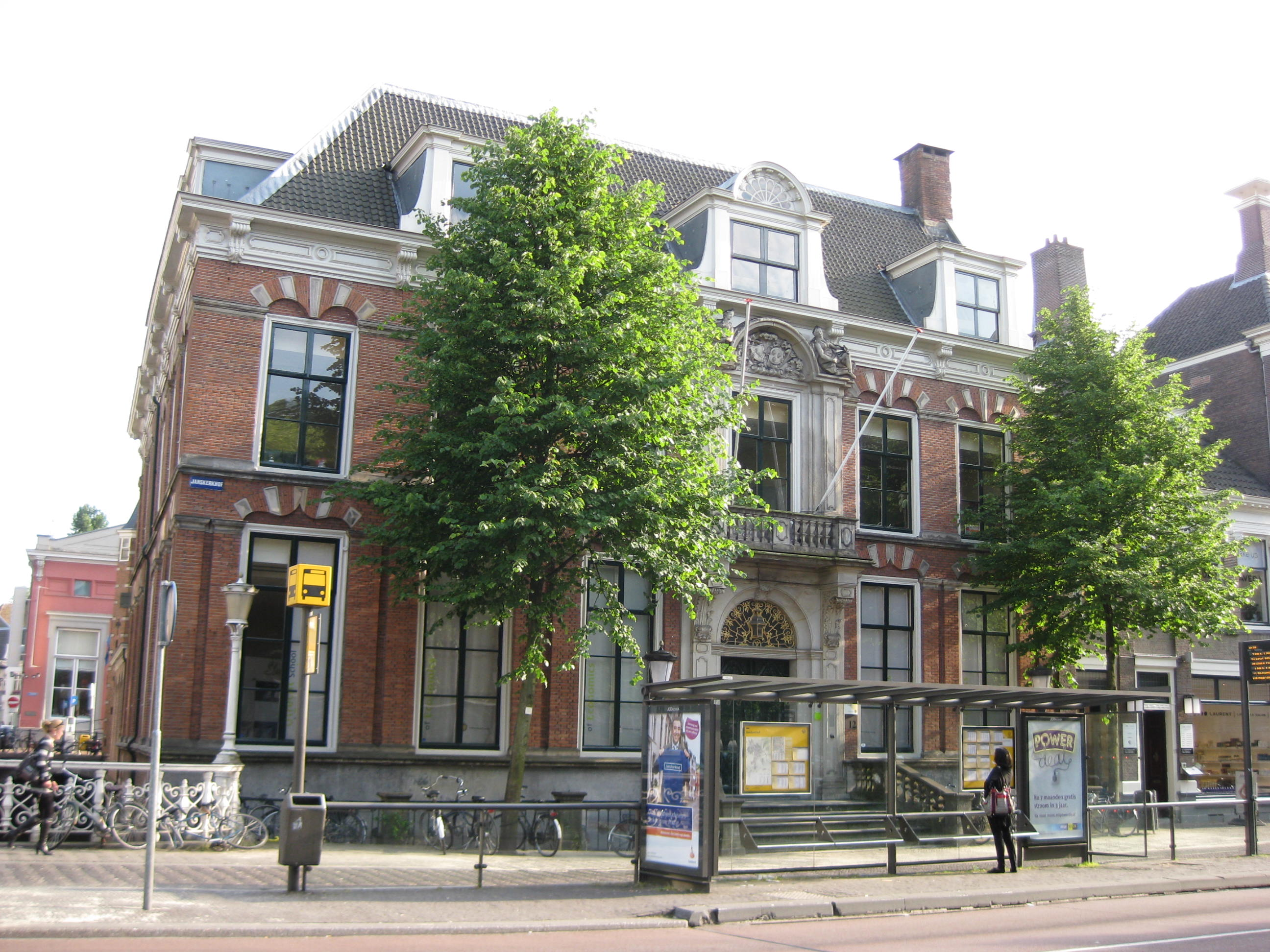
Protestant Theological University

Protestant Theological University (abbreviated as PThU; Dutch: Protestantse Theologische Universiteit) is a theological university with locations in the Dutch city of Utrecht. The Protestant Theological University primarily caters for ministerial education and as such is one of three institutes recognised by the PKN, but it is also possible to study general (Calvinist) theology without wishing to become a minister.

== History ==
The university was founded in 1854 as the Theological School ("Theologische School") by the Christian Reformed Church in the Netherlands, a church resulting from a schism in 1834, to provide for theological education for its ministers. The name was changed to Theological College ("Theologische Hogeschool") in 1939 and finally to Theological University in 1986, after a reform in the Dutch university/polytechnic system.

In 1892, a large part of the Christian Reformed Church in the Netherlands merged with another group split from the mainstream Dutch Reformed Church to form the Reformed Churches in the Netherlands, which founded a new Calvinist university in Amsterdam: the Free University. This university also has a theological faculty, but the college at Kampen remained a separate institution.

In 1944, another schism within the Reformed Church in the Netherlands occurred, called the Liberation ("Vrijmaking"), which resulted in the Reformed Churches in the Netherlands (Liberated). This new church also had a need for its own ministerial education institute, and so a new university was founded from parts of the Theological University: Kampen Theological University of the Reformed Church (Liberated).

In 2010, the PThU moved from Kampen to Amsterdam and Groningen. In 2025, the university moved to a single central location in Utrecht.

After the Reformed Church in the Netherlands merged with the Dutch Reformed Church and the Evangelical Lutheran Church in 2004 to form the Protestant Church in the Netherlands (PKN), the Protestant Theological University became part of the PKN. It is run on its behalf by a board of curators.

On 13 April 2022 the PThU announced its intention to move the university to Utrecht. On 21 April 2022, the general synod of the Protestant Church in the Netherlands (PKN) confirmed that decision. The move was finalized in February 2025.
