= Klaas Schilder =

Dutch Neo-Calvinist theologian and professor (1890–1952)

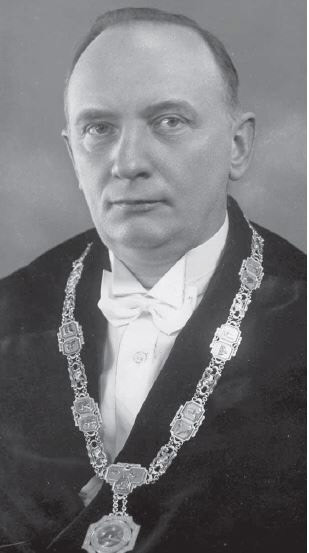
- Born: December 19, 1890; Kampen, Overijssel
- Died: March 23, 1952 (aged 61); Kampen, Overijssel
- Occupations: Professor, minister, writer

Klaas Schilder (19 December 1890 – 23 March 1952) was a Dutch Neo-Calvinist theologian and professor in the Reformed Churches in the Netherlands (Dutch Gereformeerde Kerken in Nederland or GKN) and later in the Reformed Churches in the Netherlands (Liberated) (Dutch Gereformeerde Kerken (vrijgemaakt)).

Schilder was born into a national church (Nederlandse Hervormde Kerk) family in Kampen, the Netherlands; the family joined the Gereformeerde Kerken when he was a child. After graduating from a Reformed gymnasium (an academic high school), he took his theological studies at the Theological University of the Reformed Churches in Kampen and graduated cum laude in 1914. Schilder was a pastor at Ambt-Vollenhove, Vlaardingen, Gorinchem, Delft, Oegstgeest, and Rotterdam-Delfshaven. During his time as a minister Schilder published several books among which De Openbaring van Johannes en het Sociale Leven, Bij Dichters en Schriftgeleerden and the trilogy Christus in zijn Lijden.

Schilder earned his doctorate from the Erlangen University in 1933, graduating summa cum laude, with a dissertation entitled Zur Begriffsgeschichte des Paradoxon. In 1934 he became Professor of Systematic Theology at Theological University of the Reformed Churches, a position he held until his death. Beginning in 1920, Schilder contributed to De Reformatie (The Reformation), a weekly Reformed journal. He became an editor for the publication in 1924 and its sole editor in 1935. As professor of theology Schilder published numerous books among which Heaven, what is it? (1935), Christ and Culture (1948) his uncompleted systematic theology, De Heidelbergse Catechismus (1947-1953).

Schilder resisted the German invasion and opposed the Nazi conquest. He was arrested by the Germans in August 1940 and later released. Because he was so outspoken, Schilder spent much of the war in hiding.

On 3 August 1944, Schilder was suspended for being schismatic, and the Reformed community was incensed that one of its leaders had been so condemned. The result was a schism within the GKN and the birth of the Reformed Churches in the Netherlands (Liberated), then consisting of 216 congregations, 152 ministers, and 77,000 members. Schilder died of a heart attack on 23 March 1952.

Schilder was married to Johanna Walter. They had four children.

== Christ in his Suffering ==
During this period Schilder published his three-part work, Christus in Zijn lijden, commonly known in English as The Schilder Trilogy (Christ in His Suffering, Christ on Trial, and Christ Crucified). This work was a massive expansion on a series of sermons Schilder had preached in Kampen. The publisher, J. H. Kok, heard those sermons and requested Schilder to write them out so that he could publish them. Schilder agreed to this upon the condition that Kok paid for a stenographer who would type out his dictation. For many days Schilder walked and talked. The first edition, on which the English translation is based, was published in the early 1930s. While in hiding during the war Schilder revised the text and after the war a new Dutch edition was published.

== Publications in English ==
- Christ in His Suffering Translated by Henry Zylstra (Eerdmans 1938)
- Christ on Trial Translated by Henry Zylstra.(Eerdmans 1939)
- Christ Crucified Translated by Henry Zylstra.(Eerdmans 1940)
- Heaven, What is it? Abridged and translated by Marian M. Schoolland (Eerdmans 1950)
- Christ and Culture Translated by G. van Rongen and W. Helder (Premier 1977)
- Christ and Culture Foreword by Richard Mouw. Annotated by Jochem Douma. Translated by W. Helder and A. Oosterhoff (Lucerna 2015).
- The Klaas Schilder Reader: The Essential Theological Writings Edited by George Harinck, Marinus De Jong, and Richard Mouw. Translated by A. Gootjes and A. Oosterhoff. (Lexham Press 2022)
