= List of presidents of Calvin University =

The President of Calvin University is the chief executive officer of the school. The office is not as old as Calvin University, which had no need for such a position when it was founded in 1876. When the Theological School of the Christian Reformed Church opened in 1876, it had one instructor. As other instructors joined the staff, the title Rector was applied to the person in charge of daily affairs, while the title of docent was applied to all other faculty. When the literary curriculum was added in 1894, the head of the Literary section went by the title of Principal. The office of College President was created in 1918 to replace the office of Principal. The seminary head remained the Rector until 1931, when that title also was changed to Seminary President.

== List of Presidents of Calvin University ==
- 1876–1902 Geert Boer (Docent)
- 1900–1918 Albertus Rooks (Principal)
- 1919–1925 John Hiemenga
- 1925–1930 Johannes Broene
- 1930–1933 Rienk Kuiper
- 1933–1939 Ralph Stob
- 1939–1951 Henry Schultze
- 1951–1976 William Spoelhof
- 1976–1995 Anthony J. Diekema
- 1995–2012 Gaylen James Byker
- 2012–2022 Michael K. Le Roy
- 2022–2024 Wiebe Boer
- 2024–present Gregory Elzinga
