= Afeosemime Adogame =

Nigerian scholar of religion

Afeosemime Unuose Adogame
- Occupation: Scholar of Religion

Academic background
- Education: University of Bayreuth, Germany

Academic work
- Discipline: Religion and Society
- Sub-discipline: World Christianity, African Christianity, African Christian diasporas, indigenous religions, new religious movements, migration and transnationalism
- Institutions: Obafemi Awolowo University, Ile-Ife, Nigeria Ambrose Alli University, Ekpoma, Nigeria The University of Edinburgh University of Bayreuth Princeton Theological Seminary

Afeosemime (Afe) Adogame is a Nigerian scholar and the Maxwell M. Upson Professor of Religion and Society at Princeton Theological Seminary, New Jersey, United States. Afe is also a professor extraordinaire at Stellenbosch University, South Africa. He is currently the chair of the Religion and Society at Princeton Theological Seminary.

== Education ==
Adogame holds a PhD from the University of Bayreuth, Germany in History of Religions under the supervision of Ulrich Berner. He received a bachelor's degree in Religious Studies from Bendel State University, Ekpoma, now Ambrose Alli University, and a master's in Religious Studies from Obafemi Awolowo University, Ile-Ife, Nigeria.

== Career ==
Adogame is currently the Maxwell M. Upson Professor of Religion and Society at Princeton Theological Seminary and professor extraordinaire at the Stellenbosch University, South Africa. He was chair of the History and Ecumenics Department at Princeton Theological Seminary. He taught at the Department of Religions, University of Lagos, Nigeria, between 1998 and 2002. He later returned to the University of Bayreuth where he served as lecturer and senior research fellow before joining the University of Edinburgh in 2005.

== Research ==
Afe Adogame researches world Christianity, African Christianity, and African Christian diasporas, interrogating multiple intersections that affect lived religion. His research focuses on religious experiences in Africa, the African diaspora, and World Christianity. He interrogates new dynamics of lived religious experiences in Africa and the African diaspora, especially the intersections of religion, migration and transnationalism, reverse mission, new religious movements, indigenous religions, globalization, politics, economy, media, and civil society. His multifaceted disciplinary engagement with World Christianity, African Christianity, and new Indigenous religious movements implores a transdisciplinary methodology in engaging with Religion across continents.

== Grants and awards ==
- John Templeton Religion Foundation Grant, in collaboration with Nagel Institute- Calvin University on "Engaging African Realities: Integrating Social Science within African Theology," 2021–2024.
- John Templeton Foundation Grant hosted by Canisius College on "Modernization, Megachurches and the Urban Face of Christianity in the Global South," 2020–2022.
- American Academy of Religion Collaborative Research Grant 2014 with Damaris Seleina Parsitau on "The Feminization of New Immigrant African Pentecostal Diasporic Religious Cultures," 2013–2014.

== Selected works ==
=== Monographs ===
1. Adogame, A. (2021). Indigeneity in African religions: Oza worldviews, cosmologies and religious cultures. Bloomsbury Publishing.
2. Adogame, A. (2014). The African Christian Diaspora: New Currents and Emerging Trends in World Christianity. Bloomsbury Academic.
3. Adogame, A. (1999). Celestial Church of Christ: the politics of cultural identity in a West African prophetic charismatic movement. Lang.

=== Co-authored works ===
1. Adogame, A, & Harvey, G (2025). The Routledge Handbook of Research Methods in the Study of Indigenous Religions. Taylor and Francis Group, London and New York.
2. Adogame, A., Bauman, C. M., Parsitau, D., & Yip, J. (eds.). (2024). The Routledge Handbook of Megachurches. Taylor & Francis.
3. Adogame, A., Aminta Arrington (eds.) (2023). Interconnectivity, Subversion, and Healing in World Christianity: Essays in Honor of Joel Carpenter. Bloomsbury.
4. Adogame, A., Corey L. Williams, & Olufunke Adeboye, (eds) (2020). Fighting in God's Name: Religion and Conflict in Local-Global Perspectives. Lexington Books.
5. Adogame, A., Barreto, R. C., & Da Rosa, W. P. (eds.) (2019). Migration and Public Discourse in World Christianity (Vol. 2). Fortress Press.
6. Adogame, A., Nick J. Watson, & Andrew Parker, (eds.) (2018). Global Perspectives on Sports and Christianity. Routledge.
7. Adogame, A., Giselle Vincett, Elijah Obinna, & Elizabeth Olson, (eds) (2014). Christianity in the Modern World: Changes and Controversies. Routledge.
8. Adogame, A. (2014). The Public Face of African New Religious Movements in Diaspora: Imagining the Religious ‘Other’ . Routledge.
9. Adogame, A., & Lawrence, A. (eds.) (2014). Africa in Scotland. Brill.
10. Adogame, A., Anderson Jeremiah, & Janice McLean (eds.) (2014). Engaging the World: Christian Communities in Contemporary Global Societies.
11. Adogame, A., Ezra Chitando, Bolaji Bateye (eds.) (2013). African Traditions in the Study of Religion, Diaspora, and Gendered Societies. Essays in Honor of Jacob Kehinder Olupona. Routledge.
12. Adogame, A., Magnus Echtler, Oliver Freiberger (eds.) (2013). Alternate Voices: A Plurality Approach for Religious Studies: Essays in Honor of Ulrich Berner. Vandenhoeck & Ruprecht.
13. Adogame, A. U., Chitando, E., & Bateye, B. (Eds.). (2012). African Traditions in the Study of Religion in Africa: Emerging Trends, Indigenous Spirituality and the Interface with Other World Religions. Essays in Honor of Jacob Kehinder Olupona. Routledge
14. Adogame, A., & Shankar, S. (2012). Religion on the Move!: New Dynamics of Religious Expansion in a Globalizing World (Vol. 15). Brill.
15. Adogame, A., & James V. Spickard (2010). Religion Crossing Boundaries: Transnational and Social Dynamics in Africa and the New African Diaspora. Brill.
16. Adogame, A., Roswith Gerloff, & Klaus Hock (eds.) (2011). Christianity in Africa and the African Diaspora: The Appropriation of a Scattered Heritage. Continuum.

=== Articles and book chapters ===
1. Adogame, A. (2025). Looking Back to the Future: Lived Christianities and the Politics of Tradition and Innovation. Theology Today, 82(1), 85-98.
2. Adogame, A. (2022). Trumping the Devil: Engendering the Spirituality of the Marketplace within African and the African Diaspora. In Brian Steensland, Jaime Kucinkas, and Anna Sun (Eds). Situating Spirituality: Context, Practice, and Power, pp 97–112. Oxford: Oxford University Press.
3. Adogame, A. and Amwe, R. V (2022). Leveraging African Spirituality and Popular Culture: Betwixt Africa and the African Diaspora. Journal for the Academic Study of Religion Special Issue: Religion, Spirituality and the New African Diaspora, 34 (3) 242–266.
4. Adogame, A. (2014). African New Religious Movements. In George Chryssides and Benjamin E. Zeller (Eds). The Bloomsbury Companion to New Religious Movements, pp. 235 –252. London: Bloomsbury Academic.
5. Adogame, A. (2010). Pentecostal and Charismatic Movements in a Global Perspective. The New Blackwell Companion to the Sociology of Religion, 498–518.
