= Diekema =

Diekema is a surname. Notable people with the surname include:

- Anthony Diekema (born 1933), American university president
- Gerrit J. Diekema (1859–1930), American politician
