= R. B. Kuiper =

Dutch-American pastor and academic (1886–1966)

- Born: 1886; Garrelsweer, Groningen
- Died: 1966 (aged 79–80)
- Occupation: Calvin College
- Title: President
- Term: 1930–1933
- Predecessor: Johannes Broene
- Successor: Ralph Stob
- Spouse: Marie Janssen
- Children: Marietta Rolena Heerema; Dr. Klaudius Kuiper; Kathryn Junia Kuiper

Rienk Bouke Kuiper (31 January 1886 – 22 April 1966) was a pastor and professor of systematic theology. Kuiper served as President of Calvin College between 1930 and 1933.

== Biography ==
Kuiper was born in Garrelsweer, in the municipality of Loppersum, in the Netherlands. He was the son of Klaas Kuiper and younger brother of Barend Klaas Kuiper. His family moved to Grand Haven, Michigan in 1891 when his father accepted a call to be minister of the Christian Reformed congregation there. Kuiper graduated from the University of Chicago (A.B., 1907); Indiana University Bloomington (A.M., 1908); Calvin Theological Seminary (diploma, 1911); and Princeton Seminary (B.D., 1912). He served as the pastor of several congregations in West Michigan, including one in the Reformed Church in America.

In 1928 he accepted a one-year appointment to Westminster Theological Seminary in Philadelphia, as Professor of Systematic Theology, and later served there as a professor for the largest part of his teaching ministry.

The Synod of the Christian Reformed Church had persuaded Kuiper to accept the presidency of Calvin College in 1930. During his tenure the economic impacts of the Great Depression began to be keenly felt. Although enrollment did not decline, partly because a lack of jobs meant young people pursued education, the downturn forced the college to cut costs and expenses. Faculty voluntarily took pay cuts, as high as 40 percent. Kuiper also found it difficult to mediate the growing differences of opinion among faculty and between faculty and the Board of Trustees over the school's direction. In 1933 he took up the position of Professor of Practical Theology at Westminster Seminary. Retiring in 1952, he returned to Grand Rapids and then accepted the presidency of Calvin Theological Seminary for four years. Kuiper was also a founding member of the Evangelical Theological Society.

Kuiper married Marie Janssen in 1911. They had three children: Marietta Rolena Heerema, Dr. Klaudius Kuiper and Kathryn Junia Kuiper, who died at age two.

== Works ==
- As to Being Reformed
- Not of the World
- For Whom Did Christ Die?
- God Centered Evangelism
- The Glorious Body of Christ
- While the Bridegroom Tarries: Ten After-the-War Sermons on the Signs of the Times (1919)

Academic offices
Preceded by Johannes Broene	President of Calvin College; 1930–1933	Succeeded by Ralph Stob
