= Henry Schultze =

American academic (1893–1959)

- Born: July 18, 1893; Sully, Iowa, U.S.
- Died: March 6, 1959 (aged 65); Grand Rapids, Michigan, U.S.
- Occupations: Educator, college president
- Title: President, Calvin College
- Term: 1940-1951
- Predecessor: Johannes Broene
- Successor: William Spoelhof

Henry Schultze (July 18, 1893 – March 6, 1959) was an American academic and president of Calvin College in Grand Rapids, Michigan.

== Early life and education ==
Schultze was born in Sully, Iowa, the son of William Schultze and Anna Van Woerkom Schultze. His parents were both immigrants; his father was born in Germany and his mother was born in the Netherlands. He graduated from Calvin College in 1915. He attended Calvin Theological Seminary and Yale University, graduating in 1920.

== Career ==
After seminary, Schultze taught Greek and education at Grundy College. In 1924, he was ordained as a minister in the Christian Reformed Church. In 1926 he was appointed a professor at Calvin Theological Seminary. Schultze served ten years as president of the National Union of Christian Schools, beginning in 1930. Because of his skill as a teacher and his long-standing support for Christian education, Schultze was appointed Calvin College president in 1940.

During Schultze's tenure, the enrollment at Calvin College during World War II but rebounded quickly when the war was over. In 1949 Schultze oversaw the restructuring of the academic governance process and in 1950 he took part in the dedication of a new science building on the Franklin campus. After resigning the college presidency due to ill health in 1951, he was appointed Professor Extraordinary at Calvin Theological Seminary.

== Personal life and legacy ==
Schultze married Jeannette Ophof in 1920 and they had three children. He died in Grand Rapids in 1959, following a stroke, at age 65. Today, the dormitory Schultze Hall at Calvin College is named in his honor.

Preceded by Johannes Broene	President of Calvin College; 1940-1951	Succeeded by William Spoelhof
