= Byker (surname) =

Byker is a surname. Notable people with the surname include:

- Carl Byker, American television producer, writer, and director
- Gaylen Byker (born 1948), American businessman and academic administrator
- Mary Byker (born 1963), English singer, record producer, and DJ

== See also ==
- Baker (surname)
