= John Clover Monsma =

Dutch-American minister and writer (1890–1970)

Rev. John Clover Monsma (December 15, 1890 – April 24, 1970) was a Dutch-American Presbyterian minister turned writer, editor and journalist on religious issues, best known as the author of the book "The Evidence of God in an Expanding Universe."

He was also a radio commentator, and served as pastor at the Presbyterian Church. He worked as a priest for a period of time, and then he turned his attention to studying political and social issues, and paid special attention to studying the relationship between religion and science throughout history.

== Biography ==
He was born in the Netherlands on 14 December 1890. In 1902, he immigrated to the United States and stayed in Grand Rapids, Michigan. He attended Calvin Seminary graduating in 1917. In the same year, he became a minister at Summit, Illinois. In 1919, he embroiled the congregation in his dream of launching a Kuyperian daily newspaper in Chicago. The body, with the concurrence of Classis Illinois, granted him an indefinite leave of absence, but when the enterprise failed in 1921, the consistory revoked the leave. Monsma thereupon resigned from the ministry, which action went directly against the church order. The next year, he sought to withdraw his hasty resignation letter, but the consistory would not hear of it, having received many sharp letters from their former cleric.

== Works ==
He has authored several books, including:

- What Calvinism Has Done for America (1919)
- The Story of the Church (1931)
- The Shepherd King: a Romance of Abraham and the Ancient Near East (1935)
- The Evidence of God in an Expanding Universe: Forty American Scientists Declare their Affirmative Views on Religion (1958) (Note: The forty essayists were diverse, middle-ranking scientists: 10 at state universities; 13 at Christian colleges, and 17 in government, industry, or private sectors; 16 were in life and biological science, 3 in medicine, 3 in technology, 11 in math/physics, and 7 in chemistry.)
- Science and Religion: Twenty-Three Prominent Churchmen Express their Opinions (1962) (Note: The book was re-published with the title of 'Science and Religion: Twenty Three Outstanding Members of the Clergy Tell How Modern Science has Affected Their Innermost Beliefs.')
- Religion and Birth Control: Twenty-One Medical Specialists Write in Plain Language about Control of Conception, Therapeutic Abortion, Sterilization, Natural Childbirth, Artificial Insemination (1963)
- Behind the Dim Unknown: 26 Notable Scientists Face a Host of Unsolved Problems (1966)

== Death ==
He died on 24 April 1970, in Grand Rapids, Michigan, at the age of 79.
