= Ralph Stob =

American educator and academic administrator (1894–1965)

- Born: 1894; Chicago, Illinois, U.S.
- Died: April 1965 (age 71); Grand Rapids, Michigan, U.S.
- Occupation: Calvin College
- Title: President
- Term: 1933-1939
- Predecessor: Rienk Kuiper
- Successor: Henry Schultze

Ralph Stob (1894 – 1965) was an educator, academic, and former president of Calvin College in Grand Rapids, Michigan.

== Early life and education ==
Stob was born in Chicago, Illinois, and attended Roseland Christian School. He graduated from Calvin College in 1915. Stob accepted an appointment to teach classical languages at his alma mater. Teaching delayed his graduation from Calvin Theological Seminary until 1920. He continued to teach at Calvin while working on his graduate degrees at the University of Chicago. His master's thesis was titled "The Platonism of Shaftesbury" (1927). In 1927, he received a travel fellowship for his doctoral research. His doctoral dissertation was titled "Platonism in English Educators and Theologians: Educators of the 18th and Theologians of the 18th and 17th Centuries" (1930).

== Career ==
Stob was appointed president of Calvin College in 1933. During his tenure, he oversaw improvements to the curriculum and the beginning of a pension program for the staff. Faculty criticism, well-publicized student pranks, student criticism in the school newspaper, and student flouting of school rules made for a difficult presidency. In 1939, Stob returned to teaching Greek. In 1953 Stob was asked to assume the Chair of New Testament department in the Calvin Seminary. He retired from the seminary in 1964.

== Publications ==
- "Stoicism and Christianity" (1935)
- Christianity and Classical Civilization (1950)

== Personal life ==
Stob married Evelyn L. Mokma in 1918; they had three daughters. Stob died from a heart attack in 1965, at age 71, at his home in Grand Rapids.

Preceded by Rienk Kuiper	President of Calvin College; 1933-1939	Succeeded by Johannes Broene
