= Barend Klaas Kuiper =

Academia

Barend Klaas Kuiper (July 16, 1877 – July 21, 1961) was a history professor and author who wrote about Dutch Calvinist church history and the Protestant Reformation.

== Personal life ==
Kuiper was born in Oud-Loosdrecht in the Netherlands on July 16, 1877, to Reverend Klaas Kuiper and Maaike Kuiper (née de Bruijn). When B.K. was 14, his family moved to Chicago, Illinois, USA. He was the brother of R. B. Kuiper.

Kuiper, who modified his middle name to "Klass", graduated from the University of Chicago with a B.A. degree in 1900. He took a teaching position in the literary department of the Calvin Theological Seminary soon after.

Kuiper died on July 21, 1961, of complications from diabetes.

== Professional life ==
Kuiper was the first history professor at Calvin College (Calvin Theological Seminary), Grand Rapids Michigan, beginning in 1900, a position he held until 1928, when he was dismissed after watching a movie.

He was the editor of De Wachter from 1918 to 1922.
