= Geert Egberts Boer =

College docent

- Born: 1832; Roderwolde, Drenthe, The Netherlands
- Died: 1904; Grand Rapids, Michigan, US
- Occupation: Calvin College
- Title: Docent
- Term: 1876–1902
- Predecessor: None
- Successor: Albertus John Rooks
- Spouse: Jetske Holtrop
- Children: 6

Geert Egberts Boer was the docent of what became Calvin College in Grand Rapids, Michigan, from 1876 to 1902.

Boer was born in Roderwolde, in the Netherlands and graduated in 1864 from the theological school in Kampen. Afterwards he joined the ministry. In 1873, Boer was called to Grand Rapids, Michigan and in 1876, the Synod of the Christian Reformed Church appointed him the first professor of their newly established theological school. Using his own books and a curriculum modeled on the one used in Kampen, Boer opened the school which later became Calvin Theological Seminary and its offshoot Calvin College. Boer is also noted for encouraging the growth of Christian primary education. In 1968, the Boer-Bennink residence hall was opened in Calvin College named after Boer because of his significant contributions to Christian education, the Christian Reformed Church, and Calvin College.

Preceded by none	President of Calvin College; 1876-1902	Succeeded by Albertus John Rooks
