= Compass College of Film and Media =

Former Christian school in Grand Rapids, Michigan, US

- Type: private art school
- Religious affiliation: Christian
- President: Joanna Hogan
- Location: Grand Rapids, Michigan

Compass College of Film and Media was a private Christian art school in Grand Rapids, Michigan.

== History ==
The school changed its name to Compass College of Film and Media from Compass College of Cinematic Arts on January 1, 2022, to better reflect the career paths of the alumni and what the school is teaching its students. The college was acquired by Calvin University in the fall of 2023 and became part of the university's communication school.
