= Anthony Diekema =

American college president

- Born: Anthony J. Diekema; 1933 (age 92–93); Zeeland, Michigan, US
- Title: President of Calvin College
- Spouse: Doris Jeane Waanders

Academic background
- Education: Calvin College; Michigan State University

Academic work
- Discipline: Sociologist

Anthony J. Diekema (born 1933) was the President of Calvin College from 1976 to 1995.

Diekema graduated from Calvin College in 1956, where he played on the men's basketball team, and went on to receive a master's degree and a doctorate in sociology from Michigan State University. When Diekema came to Calvin College in 1976, he completed the development of the campus master plan and began construction projects to meet growing needs. He also purchased more land for the college to expand further and oversaw the expansion of the curriculum. During his tenure, enrollments rose above 4,000 for the first time. He is married to Doris Jeane Waanders and they have seven children.

Academic offices
Preceded by William Spoelhof	President of Calvin College; 1976–1995	Succeeded by Gaylen Byker
