= Klaas Kuiper =

Klaas Kuiper (June 15, 1841 – March 8, 1921) was a Dutch-American minister.

He was born in Dwingeloo, Netherlands. He studied at the Theological School in Kampen and became a minister of the Christian Reformed Church, serving in Oud Loosdrecht, Ferwerd, and Garrelsweer. In 1891 he emigrated to the United States, and served as minister in Christian Reformed congregations in Grand Haven, Chicago, and Holland, Michigan.

Kuiper was staunchly orthodox. He served as President of the CRC Synod in 1894 and worked hard in the field of Christian parent-controlled schools, serving as founding president of the Society for Christian Instruction on Reformed Principles. A colleague described him as "the father of Christian education."

He was the father of Barend Klaas Kuiper and Rienk Bouke Kuiper.
