= William Spoelhof =

American college president (1909–2008)

- Born: December 8, 1909; Paterson, New Jersey; United States
- Died: December 3, 2008 (aged 98); Grand Rapids, Michigan; United States
- Occupations: Calvin College; University of Michigan
- Title: President
- Term: 1951–1976
- Predecessor: Henry Schultze
- Successor: Anthony Diekema
- Spouse: Angeline Nydam
- Children: Robert Spoelhof, Elsa Scherphorn, and Peter Spoelhof.

William Spoelhof (December 8, 1909 – December 3, 2008) was the President of Calvin College, and President Emeritus of the Grand Rapids, Michigan school.

== Biography ==
Spoelhof was a native of Paterson, New Jersey, and graduated from Calvin College in 1931. He received a master's degree from the University of Michigan in 1937. After completing his doctoral studies, he returned to Calvin to teach history and political science in 1946.

In 1956, after becoming president of the college, Spoelhof was responsible for the initiation of the school's move to its current Knollcrest campus. The move was not completed until 1973. Toward the end of the 1960s Spoelhof also had to deal with the impact of nationwide student protest movements on the Calvin campus.

In 1935 Spoelhof married Angeline Nydam and they had three children. The asteroid 129099 Spoelhof is named in his honour.

Spoelhof died on December 3, 2008, just five days shy of his 99th birthday.

== Military service ==
On June 17, 1943, Spoelhof applied for a commission or warrant officer's rank in the US Naval Reserve and was accepted, becoming a Lieutenant, Junior Grade. He joined the OSS and served as an intelligence analyst, specifically focusing upon the liberation of the Netherlands. His mission of gathering intelligence in the Netherlands was terminated on October 10, 1945, and he was released from active duty on November 9, 1945.

On January 31, 1946, he was awarded the Bronze star for his actions during the liberation of the Netherlands. On February 23, 1946, he was invested as a Knight of the Order of Orange-Nassau by decree of Queen Wilhelmina.

== Bibliography ==
- Cassidy, William L., ed. History of the Schools and Training Branch, Office of Strategic Services. San Francisco: Kingfisher Press, 1983.
- Roosevelt, Kermit. War Report of the OSS (Office of Strategic Services). New York: Walker, 1976.
- 0Katz, Barry M. Foreign Intelligence: Research and Analysis in the Office of Strategic Services, 1942-45. Cambridge and London: Harvard Press, 1989.
- OSS Assessment Staff. Assessment of Men; Selection of Personnel for the Office of Strategic Services. New York: Rinehart and Company, 1948.
- Dejong, Gerald F. The Dutch in America, 1609-1974. Boston: Twayne Publishers, 1975.
- Lucas, Henry S. Netherlanders in America: Dutch Immigration to the United States and Canada, 1789-1950. Grand Rapids: William B. Eerdmans Publishing Co., 1989.
- Heaps, Jennifer Davis (1998). "Tracking Intelligence Information: The Office of Strategic Services". The American Archivist. 61 (2): 287–308. doi:10.17723/aarc.61.2.fj0j77432841j855. JSTOR 40294089.
- Kātz, Barry M. (1987). "The Criticism of Arms: The Frankfurt School Goes to War". The Journal of Modern History. 59 (3): 439–478. doi:10.1086/243224. JSTOR 1879857. S2CID 143036887.
- Burger, J. A. W. (1944). "The Liberation of Holland: Some Problems". International Affairs. 20 (3): 331–340. doi:10.2307/3018559. JSTOR 3018559.
- Banning, C.; Lohr, Henriette A. (1947). "Occupied Holland". The British Medical Journal. 1 (4502): 539–542. doi:10.1136/bmj.1.4502.539. JSTOR 20369383. PMC 2053005. PMID 20248048.
- Wilkins, Mira (2005). "Dutch Multinational Enterprises in the United States: A Historical Summary". The Business History Review. 79 (2): 193–273. doi:10.2307/25097027. JSTOR 25097027.
- Goodfriend, Joyce D. (1999). "Writing/Righting Dutch Colonial History". New York History. 80 (1): 4–28. JSTOR 23182347.

Academic offices
Preceded by Henry Schultze	President of Calvin College; 1951–1976	Succeeded by Anthony J. Diekema
