= Timeless Stories for Today and Tomorrow =

1952 anthology by Ray Bradbury

- cover of the first edition
- Author: edited by Ray Bradbury
- Language: English
- Genre: Fantasy, horror
- Publisher: Bantam Books
- Publication date: 1952
- Publication place: United States
- Media type: Print (paperback)
- Pages: 306 pp

Timeless Stories for Today and Tomorrow was an anthology of fantasy and horror stories edited by Ray Bradbury and published in 1952. Many of the stories had originally appeared in various magazines including The New Yorker, Charm, The Yale Review, Cosmopolitan, Woman's Home Companion, Tomorrow, The Saturday Evening Post, Harper's, Story, Esquire, The American Mercury, The Reporter, Today’s Woman, and Kurt Wolff Verlag.

== Contents ==
- Introduction, by Ray Bradbury
- "The Hour After Westerly", by Robert M. Coates
- "Housing Problem", by Henry Kuttner
- "The Portable Phonograph", by Walter Van Tilburg Clark
- "None Before Me", by Sidney Carroll
- "Putzi", by Ludwig Bemelmans
- "The Daemon Lover", by Shirley Jackson
- "Miss Winters and the Wind", by Christine N. Govan
- "Mr. Death and the Redheaded Woman", by Helen Eustis
- "Jeremy in the Wind", by Nigel Kneale
- "The Glass Eye", by John Keir Cross
- "Saint Katy the Virgin", by John Steinbeck
- "Night Flight", by Josephine Johnson
- "The Cocoon", by John B. L. Goodwin
- "The Hand", by Wessel H. Smitter
- "The Sound Machine", by Roald Dahl
- "The Laocoön Complex", by J. C. Furnas
- "I Am Waiting", by Christopher Isherwood
- "The Witnesses", by William Sansom
- "The Enormous Radio", by John Cheever
- "Heartburn", by Hortense Calisher
- "The Supremacy of Uruguay", by E. B. White
- "The Pedestrian", by Ray Bradbury
- "A Note for the Milkman", by Sidney Carroll
- "The Eight Mistresses", by Jean Hrolda
- "In the Penal Colony", by Franz Kafka
- "Inflexible Logic", by Russell Maloney
