= Roseland Christian School =

Coordinates: 41°41′54″N 87°37′52″W

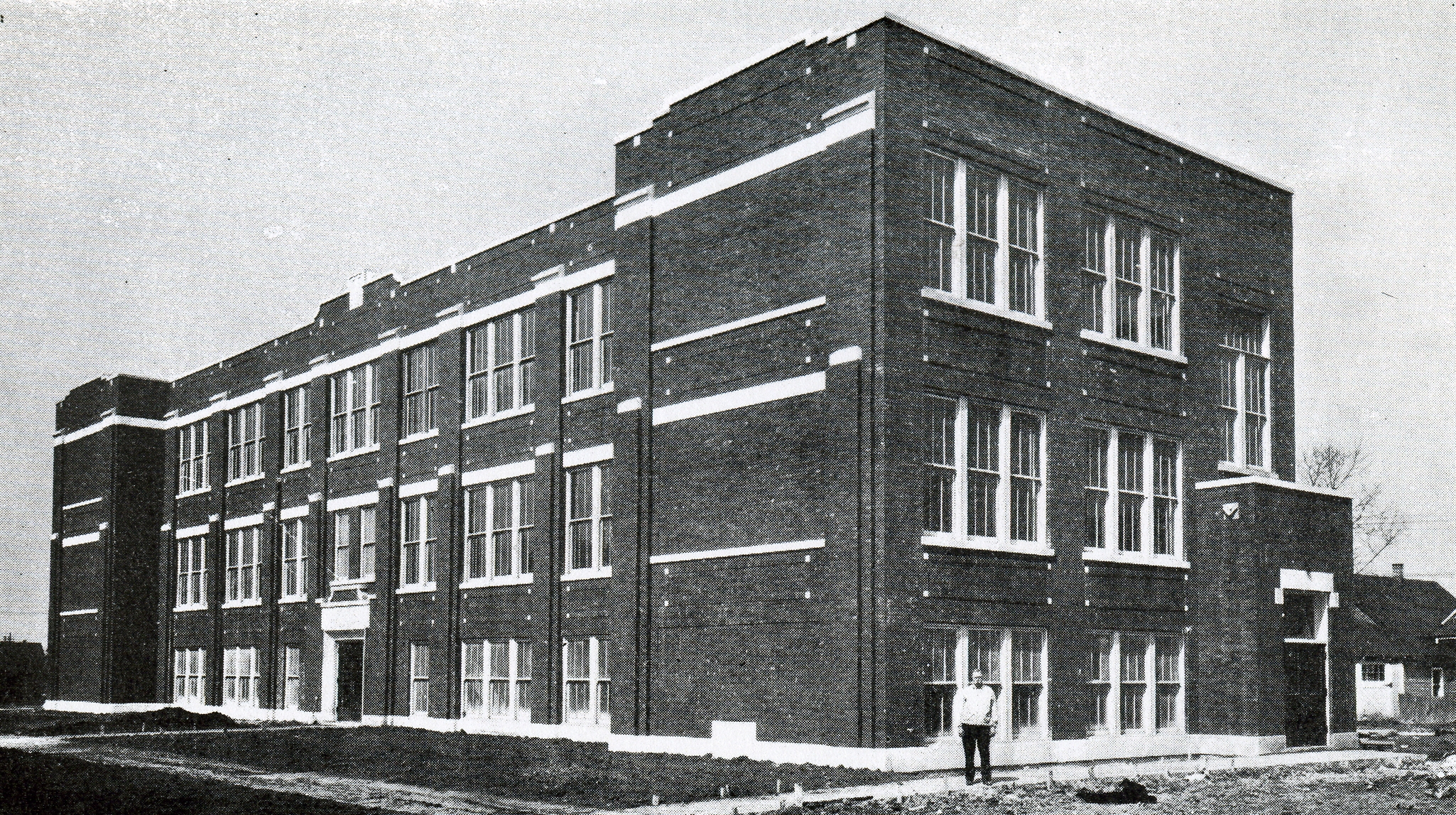
- Chicago, Illinois; United States

Information
- Type: PreK–8
- Motto: The fear of the Lord is the beginning of knowledge.
- Religious affiliation: Protestant Christian
- Established: 1884
- Head teacher: Wendi Waddy
- Faculty: 24
- Enrollment: 350
- Colors: Blue and White
- Mascot: Knights
- Website: Roseland Christian School

Roseland Christian School was a private, coeducational elementary school on the far south side of Chicago, Illinois. It was founded in Roseland as a school for the children of Dutch immigrants in the area. Later it mainly served the African American community that lives in Roseland.

== History ==
The school was founded in Roseland in 1884 by Dutch settlers in the Roseland area. These immigrants were members of the Christian Reformed Church in North America, a Protestant Calvinist denomination. In 1880, the Roseland community had been stirred by news that the Pullman Car Company would be building a new production plant nearby. Rumors of this construction prompted many to emigrate from the Netherlands. Their arrival in Roseland swelled the population, and by 1884 the consistory of the First Christian Reformed Church of Roseland voted to start a school to keep alive the Dutch language and traditions in the community. The school was known originally as De Hollandsche Christelijke school and it was attached to the back of the church. It was located at 111th and State streets.

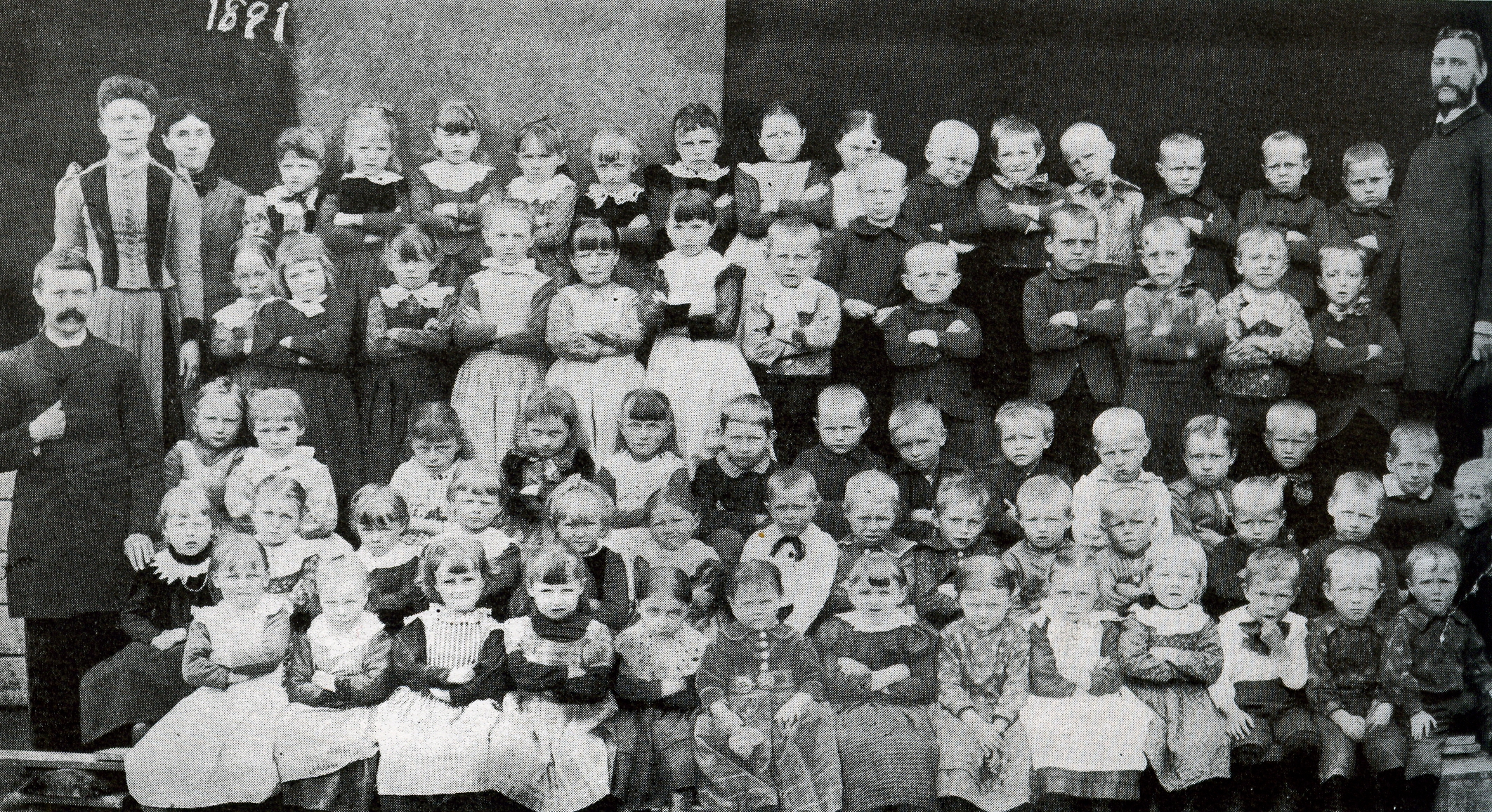
Roseland Christian School student body, 1891.

In 1890, a public school opened at the corner of 103rd and Michigan and the church fathers in the area felt that a second school was needed to provide Christian educational opportunities for the area's Dutch-speaking residents. A commission was founded to explore options for another school. It was eventually built on 104th Street as a complement to the existing school several blocks away. Classes began on 5 October 1891 with 25 students in attendance. The two schools existed separately but remarkably close to each other. The 104th Street school was controlled by the parents of the students while the 111th Street school was controlled by the principal. The two resisted many attempts to amalgamate due to the curriculum, financial, and personnel issues involved. One thing that the schools did have in common was the Dutch Language. It was not until 1910 that the 111th Street school switched to an English language curriculum for every subject. The 104th Street school followed the next year. The schools survived separately through two world wars and the Great Depression before finally coming together in 1947.

This situation continued as the demographic make-up of the Roseland neighborhood began to change in the second half of the twentieth century. As the core Dutch population began the process of white flight to the suburbs, the enrollment at the school began a slow but steady decline. In 1963, the new principal Marvin Hooker was watching over a school of 700 students and an annual budget of $150,000. By 1967, however, the decline in numbers had become very noticeable and the school administration began to look into the problems that they faced. After 85 years in operation, the school was faced with a student body of only 200 students. In response to this, Principal Hooker opened the doors to the African American community that had taken root in Roseland. This helped to revitalize the school as those around the school could get a Christian education. Roseland Christian had gone from a completely Dutch American student body in 1884 to a completely African American population by the mid-1980s.

== School closure ==
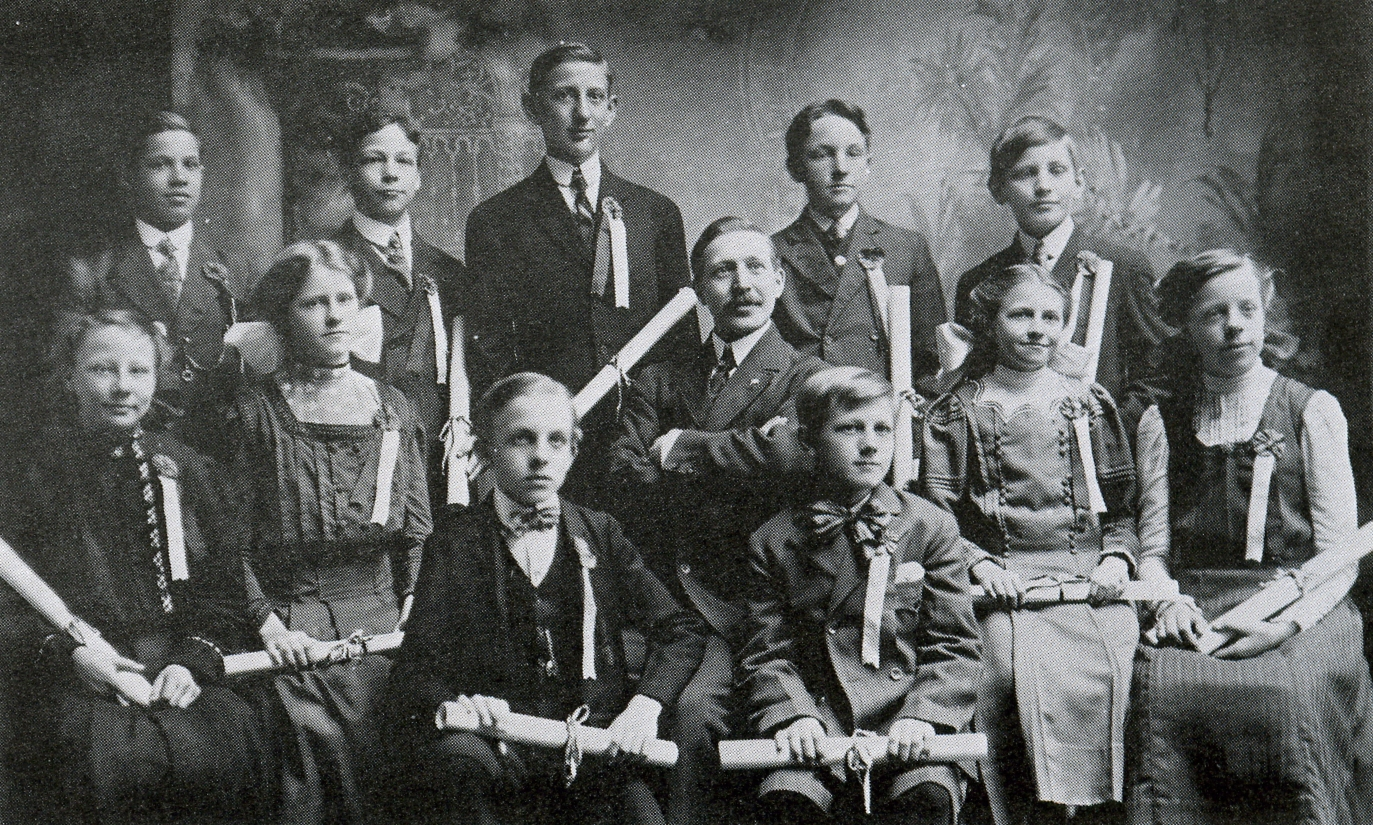
The 1910 graduating class of Roseland Christian School's 104th Street building with Jan Bovenkerk, former principal and teacher

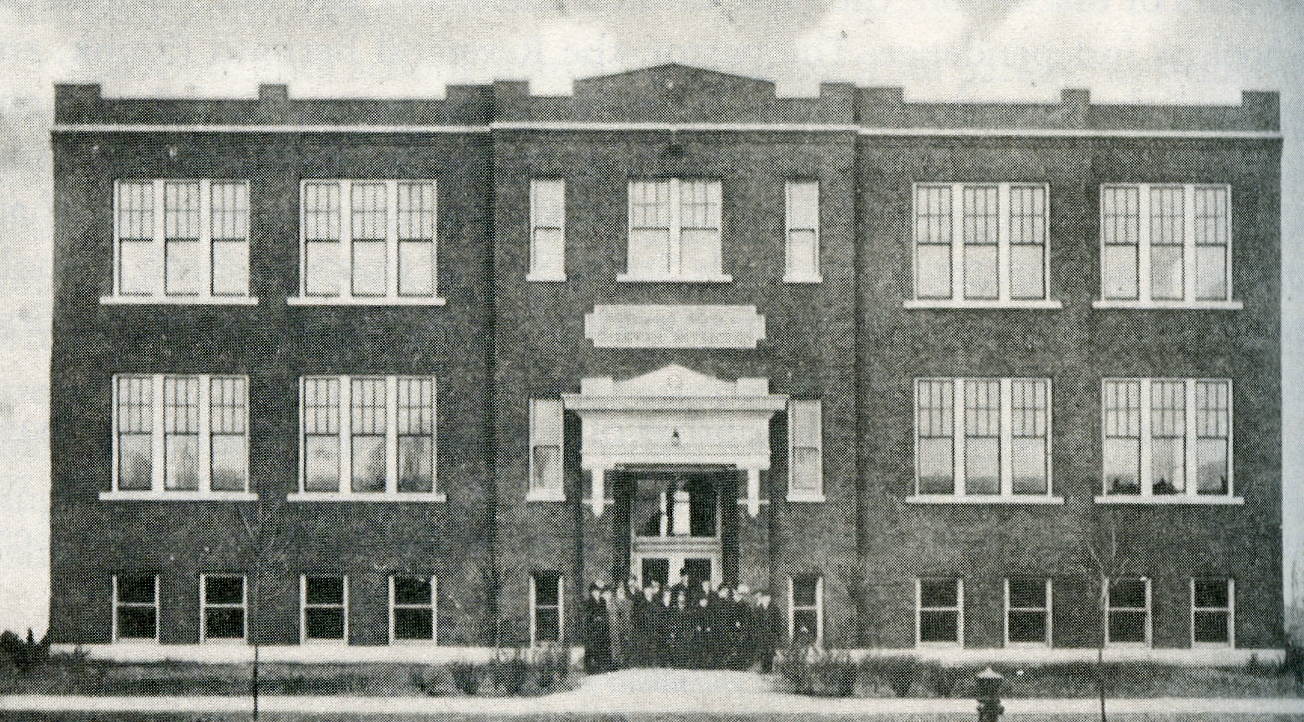
104th Street Building in 1915

The school occupied the building constructed in 1929 to replace the 111th Street campus. This had been updated and added to since its original construction, but the exterior remains much the same as it was when built. The current address of the school is 314 West 108th Street, Chicago, IL 60628.

At the end, the school was governed by the Roseland Christian School Society, which owned the property and facilities. The affairs of the Society were conducted through its Board of Trustees. To maintain the Dutch Reformed theological traditions of the church, two-thirds of the trustees must be a member of a Reformed church. The remaining members may be members of any Bible-believing Christian church.

The school closed its doors in June 2013. The building is now home to the Kwame Nkrumah Academy.

== Curriculum and extracurricular activities ==
The school building was taken over by the Kwame Nkrumah Academy, named after the first President of Ghana, who was known for his anti-colonial philosophy. The school continues to serve students from preschool through eighth grade. The preschool curriculum consists of Bible lessons, reading readiness, math, science, language Development, and socialization. At the kindergarten level adds handwriting and a more structured language arts program. From first grade through middle school, the students are presented classes in Bible, reading, social studies, math, science, and language arts.

Roseland's students also participate in sports and other extracurricular activities. The school fields teams in basketball, track and field, soccer, and volleyball. It also performs choir and band concerts and participates in academic competitions.

== Notable alumni ==
- Ravyn Lenae
- Ralph Stob
