= Wessel H. Smitter =

American novelist

Wessel Hyatt Smitter
- Born: May 9, 1892; Plainfield, Michigan
- Died: November 7, 1951 (aged 59); Eureka, California
- Education: Calvin College
- Occupation: Novelist
- Spouse: Faith
- Children: 3

Wessel Hyatt Smitter was an American novelist. He was born in Plainfield, Michigan and attended Calvin College in Grand Rapids, Michigan from 1912 to 1917. Smitter worked the early part of his career in advertising for one of the "Big 3" auto makers. He soon left that career and moved to California, where he worked selling and transplanting trees and wrote on the side. In 1938, he published F.O.B. Detroit, which was made into the 1941 movie, Reaching for the Sun, starring Joel McCrae and Ellen Drew.

Smitter's anti-industrial views, particularly of the auto industry in Michigan, where he began his career, permeate his creative works. His obituary was published in the New York Times on November 9, 1951 (p. 27)

== Partial bibliography ==
=== Novels ===
- F.O.B. Detroit Harper and Bros. (1938)
- Another Morning Harper & Brothers (1941)

=== Short stories ===
- "The Hand", republished in Timeless Stories for Today and Tomorrow
- "A Lady Named Bess" published in The Saturday Evening Post
