= A Big Hand for the Little Lady =

1966 film by Fielder Cook

- film poster
- Directed by: Fielder Cook
- Written by: Sidney Carroll
- Based on: Big Deal in Laredo; 1962 NBC teleplay by Sidney Carroll
- Produced by: Fielder Cook
- Starring: Henry Fonda; Joanne Woodward; Jason Robards
- Cinematography: Lee Garmes
- Edited by: George R. Rohrs
- Music by: David Raksin
- Color process: Technicolor
- Production company: Eden Productions Inc.
- Distributed by: Warner Bros. Pictures
- Release date: May 31, 1966
- Running time: 95 minutes
- Country: United States
- Language: English

A Big Hand for the Little Lady (released in the UK under the misleading title Big Deal at Dodge City, since the film is set in Laredo, Texas) is a 1966 American Western film made by Eden Productions Inc. and released by Warner Bros. Pictures. The film was produced and directed by Fielder Cook from a screenplay by Sidney Carroll, adapted from their TV play Big Deal in Laredo, which aired on The DuPont Show of the Week in 1962.

The film stars Henry Fonda, Joanne Woodward and Jason Robards. The original TV play starred Walter Matthau as Meredith.

== Plot ==
Upon his horse-drawn hearse, undertaker Benson Tropp calls in five of the richest men near Laredo, Texas, for a special gathering at Sam Rhine's saloon, while curious onlookers gather for occasional reports.

Settler Meredith, his wife, Mary, and their young son, Jackie, are passing through Laredo on their way to purchase a farm near San Antonio. They make arrangements to stay at Sam's saloon while the local blacksmith repairs a wheel on their wagon. Meredith, a recovering gambler who has sworn off playing cards, learns that the opulent men are there to play an annual high-stakes game of poker. He asks participant Otto Habershaw if he can watch while Mary goes to the blacksmith. Although usually not allowed, the sympathetic Habershaw vouches for his presence. After watching intently, Meredith becomes convinced he can easily increase his small fortune and buys into the game. Against the objections of his son, he gradually stakes his entire family savings.

The game builds to a climactic hand; the gamblers raise and reraise until more than $20,000 is in the pot. Meredith, out of cash, tries to barter for the latest raise when the disappointed Mary returns. Meredith collapses and Habershaw insists that they wait for him to recover. Cattleman Henry Drummond argues that he is being kept from his daughter's wedding, prompting Habershaw to disclose that he abandoned a client's defense at trial, likely condemning him. The town physician, Joseph "Doc" Scully, is called to care for Meredith, who signals for his wife to play his hand. Taking his seat, Mary asks, "How do you play this game?" At this, the other players object loudly, but slowly give in.

The situation is explained to Mary: if she cannot match the last raise (and any others that may follow), she will be out of the game. Accompanied by all four men, Mary crosses the street and asks for a loan from the owner of the bank, C. P. Ballinger. As collateral, she shows him her hand. After Ballinger is told the situation is not a practical joke, he lends Mary $5,500 (at 6% interest) and makes a $5,000 raise for her. The other players all fold. Mary collects her winnings and pays Ballinger back with interest. The game then breaks up, with the winning hand going unrevealed.

The lady's determination earns her the admiration of the men. Drummond is so touched that when he returns home to the waiting wedding ceremony, he talks privately to his weak-willed, prospective son-in-law, gives him some money, and orders him to run away and find himself a better wife.

In the end, Meredith, Mary, and their "son" are revealed to be confidence tricksters and expert card sharps. With the help of "Doc" Scully and at Ballinger's behest, they have perpetrated a scam on the other poker players, who had swindled the banker in a real-estate deal 16 years before. "Mary" is actually Ballinger's mistress, Ruby. She promised him she would give up gambling after the caper, but much to his dismay, she sits down to another game.

== Cast ==
- Henry Fonda as Meredith/Benny
- Joanne Woodward as Mary/Ruby
- Jason Robards as Henry P.G. Drummond
- Paul Ford as C.P. Ballinger
- Charles Bickford as Benson Tropp
- Burgess Meredith as Doc Joseph Scully
- Kevin McCarthy as Otto Habershaw
- Robert Middleton as Dennis Wilcox
- John Qualen as Jesse Buford
- Percy Helton as Kevin McKenzie
- Gerald Michenaud as Jackie
- James Kenny as Sam Rhine
- Allen Collins as Toby
- Jim Boles as Pete
- Milton Selzer as Fleeson
- Virginia Gregg as Mrs. Drummond
- Chester Conklin as Old Man In Saloon
- Mae Clarke as Mrs. Craig
- Ned Glass as Owney Price
- James Griffith as Mr. Stribling
- Noah Keen as Sparrow

== Nominations ==
Joanne Woodward was nominated for the Golden Laurel Award for Female Comedy Performance.

== Reception ==
The New York Times' Robert Alden enjoyed the film, praising the "seasoned set of actors" in the cast: "They are a skillful bunch, and it is a pleasure seeing real film professionals having at each other. A foxier bunch of artful poker rascals would be hard to find," crediting Meredith with "perhaps the most memorable performance of the lot". He observed, "Lee Garmes, (is) one of the master camera hands of the West, and the roving camera eye of Mr. Garmes and company provides some of the film's best moments." Alden adds: "The mixing of comedy and tragedy is sometimes uncomfortable for an audience" seeing it for the first time. However, the "delightful surprise ending ... makes the feast worthwhile".

== See also ==
- List of American films of 1966
