= Helen Eustis =

American novelist

- Eustis in the late 1940s
- Born: Helen White Eustis II; December 31, 1916; Cincinnati, Ohio
- Died: January 11, 2015 (aged 98); Manhattan, New York
- Occupations: Author and Translator
- Spouse: Alfred Young Fisher
- Children: Adam Eustis Fisher
- Parent: Harold Claypool Eustis
- Writing career
- Notable awards: Edgar Award

Helen White Eustis II (December 31, 1916 – January 11, 2015) was an American mystery writer and translator. She was born in Cincinnati. She studied art at Smith College and was awarded the Mystery Writers of America's Edgar Award in 1947 for her novel, The Horizontal Man.

== Partial bibliography ==
=== Novels ===
- The Horizontal Man (1946)
- The Fool Killer (1954)

=== Short stories ===
- The Captains and the Kings Depart, and Other Stories (1949)
- "The Rider on a Pale Horse" (1950), later republished as "Mr. Death and the Redheaded Woman" in Timeless Stories for Today and Tomorrow

=== Translations ===
- Christiane Rochefort, Cats Don’t Care For Money (1965)
- Edmonde Charles-Roux, To Forget Palermo (1968)
- Georges Simenon, When I Was Old (1971)
- Didier Decoin, Laurence: A Love Story (1971)
- Michel Salomon, Prague Notebook: The Strangled Revolution (1971)
- Romain Gary, The Enchanters (1975)
