= Johannes Broene =

- Born: 1875; Muskegon, Michigan
- Died: 1967
- Occupation: President of Calvin College
- Title: President
- Term: 1925-1930; 1939-1940
- Predecessor: 1st term: John J. Hiemenga; 2nd term: Ralph Stob
- Successor: 1st term: Rienk Kuiper; 2nd term: Henry Schultze
- Spouse: Josie Kleinhuizen

Johannes Broene (1875 – 1967) was an academic and twice served as president of Calvin College in Grand Rapids, Michigan, US. He was born in Muskegon, Michigan, and his father was a minister of the Christian Reformed Church. Broene attended the University of Michigan and Valparaiso University, from which he graduated in 1906. He went on to do graduate work at Clark University and pursued his doctorate at Clark, while working as a teacher and later principal of Christian schools in Paterson, New Jersey, and Chicago, Illinois. He joined the Calvin College faculty in 1908, teaching primarily in Philosophy and Education. In 1925 he was asked to serve one year as the interim president of Calvin College. He reluctantly accepted the appointment, and was re-appointed the next year. In 1928 he was appointed as acting president.

During his tenure, Calvin College received accreditation from the North Central Association of Colleges and Secondary Schools. He was adept at finding a middle ground when the board and faculty disagreed over administrative issues. Broene never felt comfortable with the administrative and fund-raising duties attached to the office of president and repeatedly asked to be released from the appointment. The Board of Trustees complied at the end of 1929 but in 1940 again asked him to serve as an interim president for one year. He officially retired from Calvin College in 1945, but continued teaching until 1951.

He was married to Josie Kleinhuizen and the two had no children.

Preceded by John J. Hiemenga	President of Calvin College; 1925-1930	Succeeded by Rienk B. Kuiper
Preceded by Ralph Stob	President of Calvin College; 1939-1940	Succeeded by Henry Schultze
