= Christian college =

Type of college

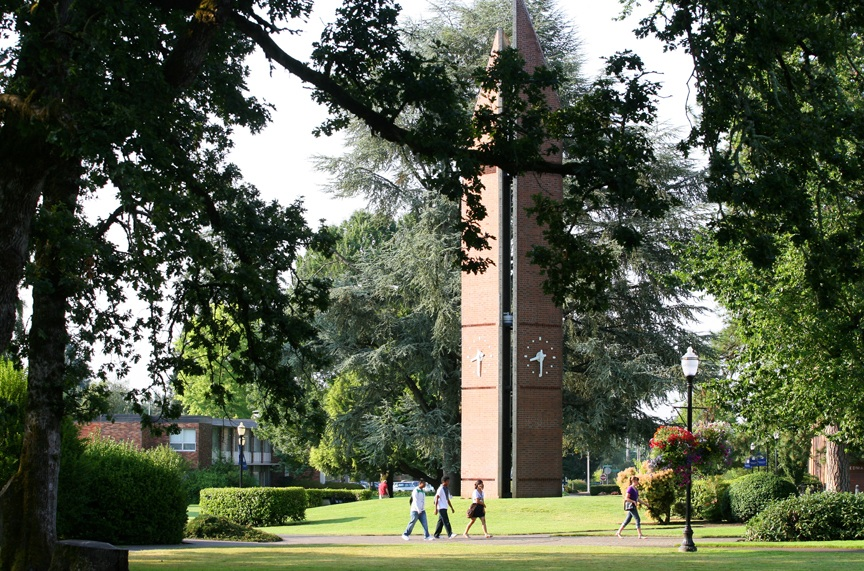
George Fox University, a Christian college in Newberg, Oregon

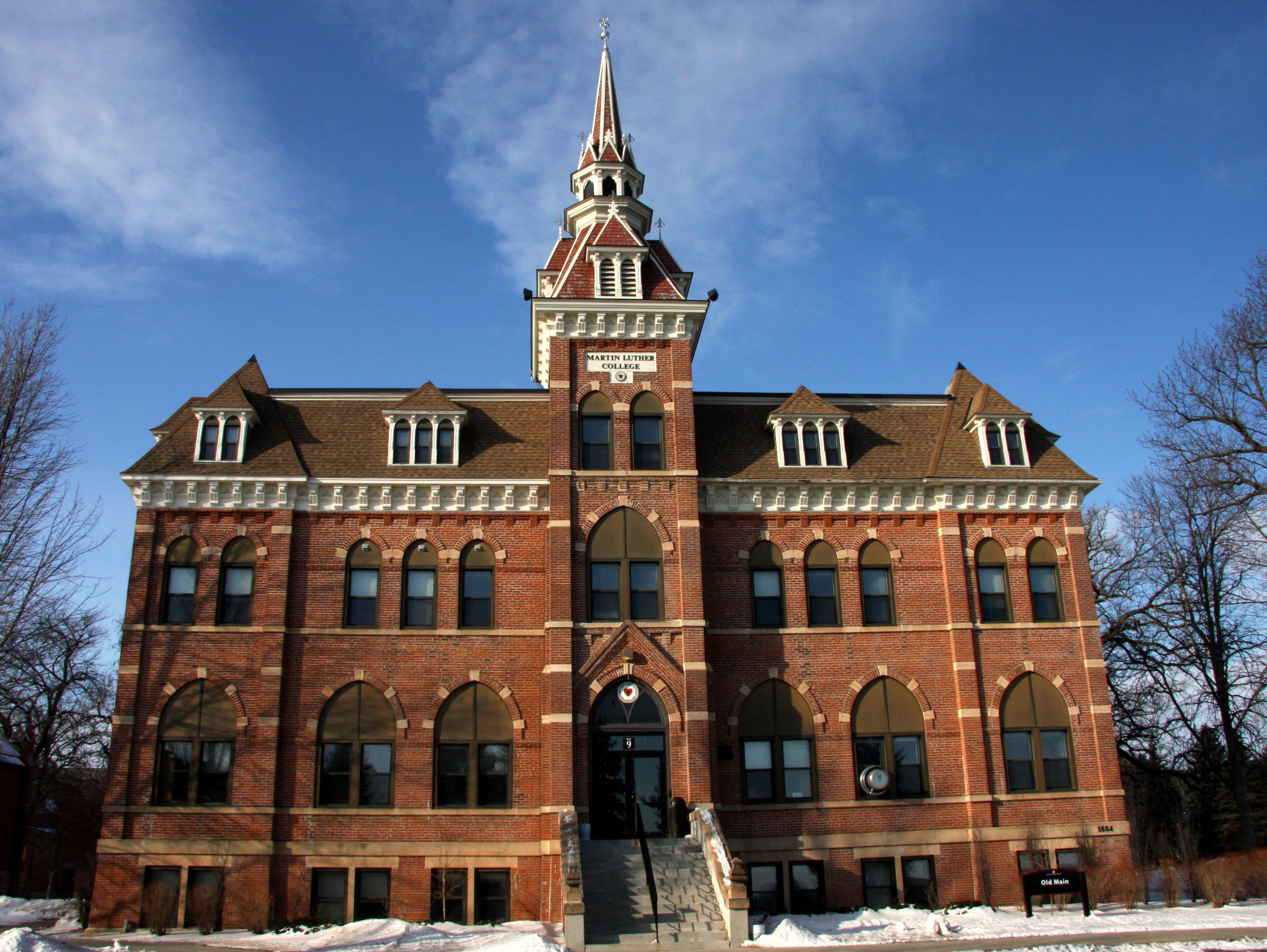
Martin Luther College, a Christian college in New Ulm, Minnesota

A Christian college is an educational institution or part of an educational institute dedicated to the integration of Christian faith and learning in traditional academic fields. Unlike Bible colleges, Christian colleges offer degrees in liberal arts and science alongside religious degrees, though still emphasizing a Christian worldview.

== Curriculum ==
Typically, the curriculum at Christian colleges is broader in scope compared to Bible colleges, including secular courses alongside biblical coursework. Christian colleges offer a range of degree programs, including liberal arts, business, nursing, and engineering, all taught from a biblical perspective while preparing students for secular, rather than ministerial, careers. Many Christian colleges also offer graduate programs, whereas Bible colleges typically only offer undergraduate programs.

== Worldwide ==
=== Australia ===
In Australia, Bible schools have traditionally focused on teaching the books of the Bible to help Christians deepen their understanding, while Christian colleges offered more in-depth studies, such as languages and discourse analysis, aimed at preparing individuals for full-time ministry. However, the lines between these institutions have blurred in recent years as Bible schools began offering degree programs, which were previously exclusive to Christian colleges. Both types of institutions integrate biblical principles into daily life.

=== United States ===
Many Christian colleges are affiliated with or are run by a Christian denomination, while others are non-denominational. Christian colleges are often regionally or nationally accredited universities that offer liberal arts and professional programs from a biblical worldview.

== See also ==
- Council for Christian Colleges and Universities
- Christian school
- Lists of universities and colleges
