= Sidney Carroll =

American screenwriter

Sidney Carroll (May 25, 1913 – November 3, 1988) was an American film and television screenwriter. Although Carroll wrote most frequently for television, he is perhaps best remembered today for writing the screenplays for The Hustler (1961) for which he was nominated for an Academy Award and for A Big Hand for the Little Lady (1966), based on his TV play Big Deal in Laredo (1962).

Carroll graduated from Harvard in 1934 and began contributing to Esquire and The Stage. He became a war correspondent during World War II, covering four Pacific invasions. He started writing for television and film in 1949. He wrote the 1952 British short film The Stranger Left No Card and co-wrote the British film Three Cases of Murder (1955) as well as writing the original story for the Michael Caine heist movie Gambit (1966).

In 1957, Carroll won an Edgar Award, in the category Best Episode in a TV Series, for writing "The Fine Art of Murder", an installment of the ABC program Omnibus. He has also won Emmys for the documentaries The Louvre (1978) and China and the Forbidden City (1963). He wrote the screenplays for the 1974 Richard Chamberlain television version of The Count of Monte Cristo. He continued to write for television until 1986.

Carroll is also remembered for a story called None Before Me which Ray Bradbury included in the anthology Timeless Stories for Today and Tomorrow. It describes a lonely miser who becomes fascinated by a lavish dollhouse. Bradbury's book is an anthology of fantasy stories, and it is only in the last sentence that the story turns to fantasy, with rather startling results.

Carroll was married to Broadway lyricist June Carroll from 1940 until his death. He is the father of prize-winning novelist Jonathan Carroll.
