= John Hiemenga =

- Born: 1877; Arum, Friesland
- Died: 1974; Worthington, Ohio
- Occupation: Calvin College
- Title: President
- Term: 1919-1925
- Predecessor: Albertus John Rooks
- Successor: Johannes Broene
- Spouse(s): Dena Fles (d. 1914) and Wilhelmina Hoodeman (m. 1916)
- Children: Hermine Venema, Ruth Himes, and Mae Westra

John J. Hiemenga (January 22, 1877 – December 23, 1974) was a Dutch-American pastor and educator and first President of Calvin College from 1919 to 1925.

Born Jan Hiemenga to Jan Hiemenga Sr. and Romkje Zoodsma in Arum, Friesland, the Netherlands, he emigrated with his family to Borculo, Michigan in 1889. Hiemenga graduated from Calvin Theological Seminary in 1905 and served as the pastor of six Christian Reformed congregations in Michigan, New Jersey, New York, and Indiana during his 42 years in the active ministry. Active in establishing Christian schools in Passaic, NJ and Grand Rapids, MI, he was appointed the first president of Calvin College.

In the fall of 1920, Grand Rapids Christian High School, which Hiemenga had helped organize, assumed responsibility for teaching the high school and began a full, four-year program. As a result, enrollment in the college preparatory department dropped from 340 to 11 during Hiemenga's tenure. To offset some of this decline, enrollment in the college curriculum increased from 94 to 273. At the same time, Hiemenga oversaw development of a teacher training (normal) program in compliance with newly enacted state law.

In addition, he solicited funds for debt reduction and construction of a dormitory in 1924. Hiemenga returned to the parish ministry in 1925. He retired from active ministry in 1947. In addition to his Calvin diplomas, Hiemenga earned A.B. and A.M. degrees from Columbia University and a B.D. degree from the Baptist Seminary in Rochester, NY. He was appointed an Officer of the House of Orange Nassau for his work on behalf of relief to the Dutch people during World War I.

Hiemenga has also been noted as an expert on Dutch-American dialects, especially in Western Michigan and New Jersey.

Hiemenga married Dena Fles (d. 1915); they had one daughter, Hermine Venema. In 1916 he married Wilhelmina Hoodeman (1898-1987), they had two daughters, Ruth Himes and Mae Westra.

== Notes ==
Preceded by Albertus John Rooks	President of Calvin College; 1919-1925	Succeeded by Johannes Broene
