= Albertus John Rooks =

American university president

- Born: 1869; Niekerk, Michigan
- Died: 1958
- Occupation: Calvin College
- Title: Principal
- Term: 1900-1918
- Predecessor: Geert Egberts Boer
- Successor: John J. Hiemenga
- Spouses: Kate Corbijn; Grace Oostining
- Children: Henry Corbijn Rooks; Rhinedale Rooks; Marius Rooks

Albertus John Rooks (1869–1958) was the Principal of Calvin College from 1900 to 1918.

| Preceded by Geert Egberts Boer | President of Calvin College; 1900-1918 | Succeeded by John J. Hiemenga |
