= Gaylen Byker =

American businessman

Gaylen J. Byker

9th President of Calvin College President of Calvin College
- In office 1995–2012
- Preceded by: Anthony Diekema
- Succeeded by: Michael K. Le Roy

Personal details
- Born: 1948 (age 77–78)
- Education: University of Michigan University of Pennsylvania

Gaylen James Byker (born 1948) is a former international businessman and former president of Calvin College in Grand Rapids, Michigan. He is a director for InterOil Corporation.

Byker is a native of Hudsonville, Michigan. He served in the United States Army from 1967 until 1970. Following his service in the Vietnam War, he attended Calvin College graduating in 1973. He went on to do graduate work, and received a master's degree in world politics and a JD from the University of Michigan, as well as a doctorate from the University of Pennsylvania.

After completing his education, he worked in the fields of international banking and energy. He also taught at American University of Beirut. Byker married Susan Lemmen in 1970 and they have two daughters.

In May 2011, Byker announced he would retire as president of Calvin College at the end of the 2011–2012 academic year.

Shortly after Byker retired as president of Calvin College in 2012, the college disclosed approximately $115 million in debt. A subsequent financial review found a $69.4 million shortfall in funds intended to support the debt. The shortfall resulted from construction costs exceeding fundraising, property purchases for which funds had not been raised, negative cash flow from rental properties, and interest costs exceeding investment earnings.

The college had used a construction-financing strategy since 1997 in which it borrowed money for building projects while investing donations intended for those projects, expecting the investment returns to help cover the debt and interest.

Preceded by Anthony J. Diekema	President of Calvin College; 1995–2012	Succeeded by Michael K. Le Roy
