= Michael K. Le Roy =

American academic administrator

Michael Le Roy

Former President of Calvin University
- In office 2012-2022
- Preceded by: Gaylen J. Byker
- Succeeded by: Wiebe Boer

Personal details
- Born: La Mesa, California, U.S.
- Education: Whitworth University (BA); Vanderbilt University (PhD)

Michael K. Le Roy is an American academic administrator who served as the 11th president of Calvin University in Grand Rapids, Michigan.

== Early life and education ==
Le Roy was born in La Mesa, California and grew up in Bainbridge Island, Washington. He attended Whitworth University, where he studied international studies and peace studies. While studying at Whitworth, Le Roy traveled and studied in three Central American countries in the midst of civil war. He worked on trade policy in apartheid-era South Africa through an internship with the Presbyterian Church in Washington, D.C.

Le Roy earned a PhD in political science from Vanderbilt University in 1994. He also studied on a Fulbright Scholarship at University of Gothenburg.

== Career ==
Le Roy taught as a visiting professor at the College of William and Mary. From 1994 to 2002, Le Roy taught political science at Wheaton College, where he chaired the department of politics and international relations, developed a new international relations major, and served for six years as the director of the Wheaton in Europe program. Le Roy was recognized with Wheaton's Faculty Achievement Award for Excellence in Teaching in 1998. He earned the Excellence in Teaching Award from the American Political Science Association in 1999.

In 2002, he returned to Whitworth where he taught political science for three years before being appointed vice president of academic affairs and dean of faculty.

On June 11, 2012, Le Roy became the 10th president of Calvin University, at the time called Calvin College.

On June 10, 2021, Le Roy announced that he would not be renewing his contract as president after June 30, 2022.
