= Grundy College =

School in Iowa, United States

Coordinates: 42.3592°N 92.7629°W

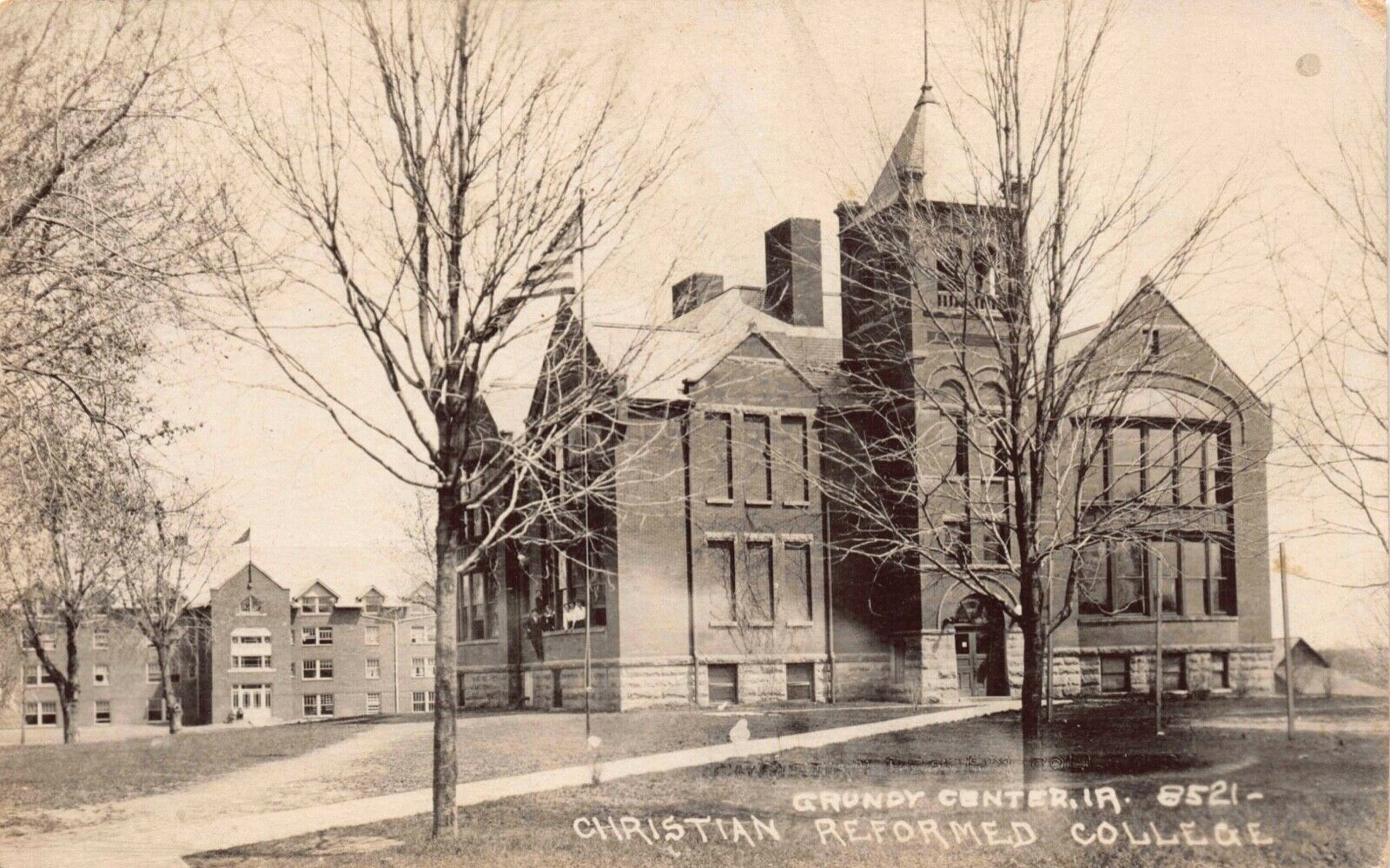
Grundy College, c.1920s

Grundy College was a secondary and post-secondary school that existed in Grundy Center, Iowa, United States, from 1916 to 1934. It was associated with the Christian Reformed Church in North America, and was founded on October 4, 1916 by German speakers within that denomination. Supporters of the college were called on when Dordt College was being formed in northwest Iowa. As of 1930, Grundy College was divided into (at least) Grundy Academy (a high school), Grundy Junior College, and the Commercial Department.

As noted by William Katerberg, professor of history and curator of Heritage Hall at Calvin University, some within the Christian Reformed Church viewed Grundy College as competition to Calvin College in Grand Rapids:

Professor Rooks viewed normal schools and Grundy College as competition not just for Calvin Junior College and its teacher training program, but for the larger dream of a four-year, bachelors degree granting college.

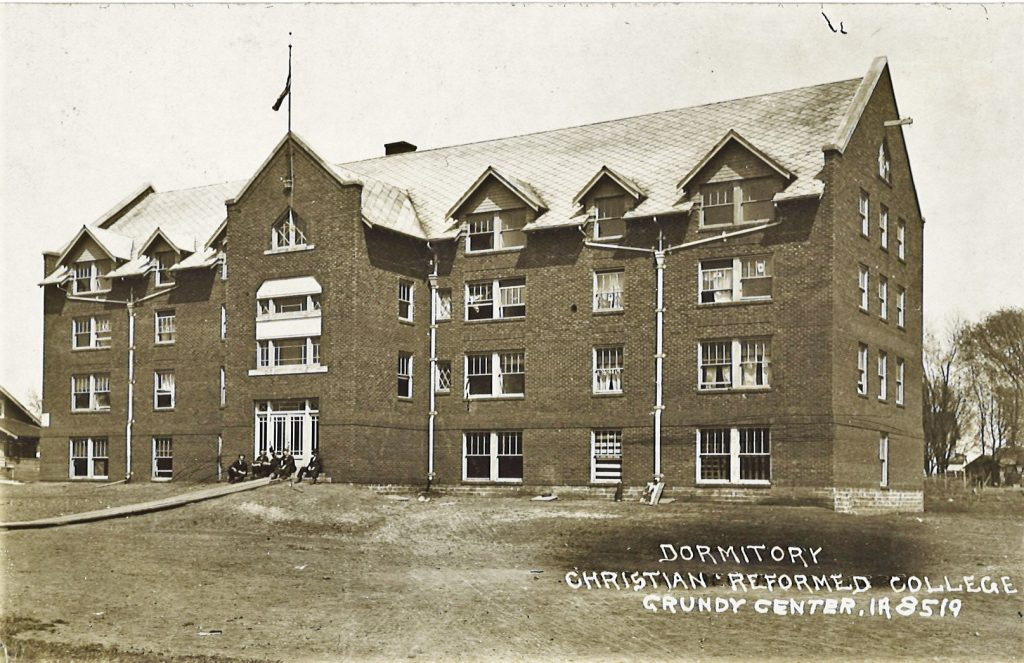
Grundy College Dormitory, c.1920s

In 1926, the college had a faculty of 10 and an enrollment of 94 students. At that time it had an endowment of $24,000 and property valued at $100,000. Buildings included a main building and a dormitory. The college ceased operation in 1934 after enduring financial downturns caused in part by the conditions of the Great Depression, but also by rivalries with other institutions.

== Timeline ==
1916 - College founded

1919 - supporting territory proposed to be expanded to include Iowa, Minnesota, Kansas, Nebraska, Colorado, North Dakota and South Dakota.

1929 - Grundy College's thirteenth annual commencement was held June 2, 3, and 4, 1929.

1930 - commencement 28 May 1930

Grundy College's men's dormitory was in use as an apartment building in January, 1960.

The southern portion of Grundy County Memorial Hospital was built over the site.
