= Wiebe Boer =

American academic administrator

Former president of Calvin University

Inaugural CEO, All On (2017–2022) Inaugural CEO, Tony Elumelu Foundation (2010–2014)
- In office 2022–2024
- Preceded by: Michael K. Le Roy
- Succeeded by: Parminder Vir (Tony Elumelu Foundation); Caroline Eboumbou (All On); Gregory V. Elzinga (Calvin University)

Personal details
- Born: Jos, Plateau State, Nigeria
- Citizenship: United States, Netherlands, Canada
- Education: Calvin University (BA); Yale University (PhD)
- Occupation: Corporate executive, historian, philanthropist
- Awards: | Academic All-American (1993, 1994) | Pew Fellowship | Mellon Fellowship | Harvey Fellowship | Fulbright Fellowship | Tutu Fellow (2009) | Nigeria Impact Investor of the Year (2022)

Wiebe Boer is a Dutch-Nigerian businessman and philanthropist who served as the 12th president of Calvin University in Grand Rapids, Michigan. He has played roles across management consulting, impact investing, philanthropy, and healthcare, including positions at McKinsey & Company, the Rockefeller Foundation, The Tony Elumelu Foundation, Boston Consulting Group, and All On. In 2024, he was appointed Chief Growth Officer of the JIPA Network Group.

== Early life and education ==
Boer was born in Jos, Nigeria, to Dutch missionary parents and attended Hillcrest School. He attended Calvin University (then Calvin College) and graduated with a Bachelor of Arts in History. During his undergraduate studies, he served two terms as a student senator and competed as an NCAA Division III Academic All-American cross-country athlete, participating twice in the NCAA D3 national championships.

He continued his education at Yale University, earning a Master of Arts, Master of Philosophy, and Doctor of Philosophy (Ph.D.) in African History. His doctoral dissertation examined the social history of football in colonial Nigeria. During his time at Yale, he served as Graduate President of the Yale African Students Association and received Pew, Mellon, Harvey, and Fulbright Fellowships.

== Career ==
On 28 March 2022, Calvin University announced that it had appointed Boer as the 12th president of the university. On 26 October 2022, Boer was officially inaugurated as president, after beginning his tenure in July of the same year.

Boer began his career as a General Manager at AfriOne Limited in Jos, Nigeria, from 2000 to 2002, followed by a role as Program Manager for World Vision International in Mauritania, managing USAID-funded development projects in agriculture, health, water, and microfinance. In 2005, he joined McKinsey & Company in Atlanta as an Engagement Manager, contributing to national agricultural development strategy planning for Kenya as part of the country's Vision 2030 plan.

From 2008 to 2010, Boer served as Associate Director at the Rockefeller Foundation in Nairobi, Kenya, where he managed deal origination in impact investing and grantmaking programs in agriculture, climate, and digital jobs. In 2010, he became the inaugural Chief Executive Officer of the Tony Elumelu Foundation in Lagos, Nigeria, establishing its entrepreneurship initiative and managing its impact investing portfolio across technology, agriculture, and edtech. He served as Chief of Staff and Strategy Director at Heirs Holdings from 2014 to 2015.

=== Boston Consulting Group and All On ===
In 2015, Boer joined the Boston Consulting Group (BCG) as a Principal, helping establish the firm's first West Africa office in Lagos and leading its Public & Social Sector practice.

From 2017 to 2022, Boer served as the founding CEO of All On, a $215 million off-grid renewable energy impact investment venture capital fund sponsored by Shell in Nigeria. During his tenure, All On executed over 50 investments in renewable energy startups and secured an additional $15 million in funding from the Rockefeller Foundation and the Global Energy Alliance for People and Planet (GEAPP).

=== Resignation from Calvin University ===
On 26 February 2024, Calvin University's board of trustees announced that Boer had resigned as president after they received a report alleging that Boer had engaged in inappropriate communications with a non-student, non-faculty member of the community.

=== Lawsuit against Calvin University and settlement ===
On 12 April 2024, Boer and his wife Joanna filed a lawsuit against Calvin University alleging breach of contract, discrimination, and defamation. The lawsuit alleges that Boer was first made aware that a complaint of inappropriate communications had been issued against him after being called to a meeting with the board of trustees on 22 February 2024. During this meeting, Boer claims he acknowledged having communications with the complainant, but denies that the communication was inappropriate. Boer also claims the board told him to limit communication to only family and a trusted advisor or he would face termination.

On 24 February 2024, the lawsuit states Boer was given a meeting with the board to defend himself. Boer claims that after the meeting, the board told him they had the votes to fire him and was given a deadline to decide if he would resign. At 4:55 pm, Boer agreed to resign as president. Following his resignation, the board released a statement that the lawsuit alleges to contain several statements that defame Boer.

Following his resignation, Boer claims he was told they had until 15 April to move out of their home, DeWit Manor (which is Calvin University's property). On 2 April 2024, the suit claims that Calvin officials entered the DeWit Manor and changed the locks to prevent the Boers from reentering the Calvin property. On 7 April, the Boer family returned from a family vacation where they claimed they were greeted by Calvin security personnel who would allow one family member to enter DeWit Manor at a time accompanied by a member of security to collect their belongings.

Following the issuing of the lawsuit, Calvin University's board of trustees issued a long, comprehensive statement addressing the alleged misinformation present throughout the Boer's lawsuit and expressing disappointment in the Boer's alleged failure to take accountability for the misconduct. The statement denied any wrongdoing and claimed that the lawsuit contained several misrepresentations of the events. On 13 June 2024, Calvin University and the Boers issued a joint statement announcing an amicable settlement of all legal matters, with all legal actions being formally dropped.

=== Subsequent career ===
In 2024, Boer was appointed Chief Growth Officer of the JIPA Network Group in Miami, Florida, directing market expansion for healthcare services and health insurance models across the Caribbean, Latin America, and South Florida.

== Selected publications ==
- Africans Investing in Africa (Palgrave, 2015, co-editor)
- Unlocking Nigeria's Potential (Boston Consulting Group, 2016)
- A Story of Heroes and Epics: The History of Football in Nigeria (1904–1960) (Bookcraft, 2018)
