= Damaris Seleina Parsitau =

Kenyan scholar

Damaris Parsitau
- Born: 1968 (age 57–58); Kajiado County, Kenya
- Other name: Seleina
- Occupation: Senior Lecturer
- Known for: Research on Women, Religion, Girls Education

Academic background
- Education: Egerton University; University of Nairobi; Kenyatta University
- Alma mater: Harvard Divinity School

Academic work
- Discipline: Religion and Philosophy
- Sub-discipline: Women's studies and Religion
- Institutions: Nagel Institute
- Notable works: Let Maasai Girls Learn

Damaris Seleina Parsitau (born 1968) is a Kenyan scholar of religion, a gender equality advocate, and feminist. She has published extensively on issues of religion, gender and society with a focus on Pentecostal Christianity. She is the first African woman president of the African Association for the Study of Religion and its Diaspora (AASR) and the first African woman Director of the Nagel Institute for the Study of World Christianity at Calvin University in Grand Rapids, Michigan. She is also part of the community of social justice scholars and practitioners at the Desmond Tutu Centre for Religion and Social Justice.

== Education and career ==
Parsitau was born in Olosho Oibor village, Kajiado in 1968. She attended Olosho Oibor Primary School, Ole Tipis and Kipsigis Girls High School.

She obtained a Bachelor of Arts degree from Egerton University in Kenya in 1992 and was employed at the same university as a graduate assistant/tutorial fellow. As part of the staff development programme, Parsitau qualified for a scholarship and obtained a master's degree from the University of Nairobi in 2000. In 2014, she earned a Ph.D. from Kenyatta University. Her doctoral thesis, titled "The civic and public roles of neo-Pentecostal churches in Kenya (1970- 2010)", explored the churches' role in Kenya's civic and public spheres. Parsitau was a senior lecturer (2015 - 2021) at the Department of Philosophy, History and Religious Studies at Egerton University, where she taught Religion and Development, Women Studies and Religion and Gender courses. She was also the Director of the Institute of Women, Gender, and Development Studies at Egerton University from 2012 until 2019.

Parsitau was a 2017 Echidna Global Scholar at The Brookings Institution, Centre for Universal Education, Washington, D.C., where she researched on global issues in girls' education. She was a visiting Associate Professor and Research Associate (2018 - 2019) at the Women Studies and African Religion Programme (WSRP), Harvard Divinity School, where she taught graduate students and undertook research for a book project.

Parsitau was a visiting research fellow at Wolfson College, University of Cambridge (2007 - 2008), Edinburgh University, Scotland (2006) and Post-graduate Research Associate (2016 - 2019), University of South Africa - UNISA. She also received training on policy writing, communication and implementation, evidenced based research, project management and a three year long leadership development training programme.

In 2021, she was appointed as an extraordinary professor at both the Desmond Tutu Centre for Religion and Social Justice, University of Western Cape, and University of South Africa.

Parsitau was the Country Director at the British Institute in East Africa between 2022 and 2023. She was appointed as the director of the Nagel Institute an educational research institute within Calvin University, where she works to date.

Parsitau serves on the editorial board of several journals. She is an editorial advisory board member of the African Journal of Gender and Religion University of Western Cape in South Africa 2018, T&T Clark Studies in Social Ethics, Ethnography and Theologies, Bloomsbury the Journal of Religion, Taylor and Francis and Journal of Modern African Studies, University of Cambridge Press 2017.

She is a board member of the World Bicycle Relief and Child and Maternal Health Africa/Canada. Parsitau has moderated panels related to girls education and presented public lectures in international forums. She is also a subject matter expert on the Women's Work, Entrepreneurship and Skilling Project in Kenya.

== Research ==
With over 25 years of experience in research in different universities and policy institutions in Africa and beyond, Parsitau has conducted research projects on the effects of education on gender equality as well as the relationship between religion and human rights. She has published over 70 book chapters and peer-reviewed journal articles. Her research interests includes Grounded Theologies and African Realities and Religion, Gender and Sexuality in Africa.

Her more recent research focuses on the intersections between religion, gender and sexuality in Africa with a special focus on women's bodies, sexual and gender-based violence, masculinities and patriarchal imaginaries in African Pentecostal Churches.

As an extraordinary professor at the Desmond Tutu Centre for Religion and Social Justice that facilitates transdisciplinary research and community engagement on the critical intersections between religion and social justice, her research interests align with the centre's thematic focus area of Religion and Gender.

Her research at the Brookings Institution on girls’ education in Maasailand, outlines promising approaches on working with Maasai leadership to advance the educational opportunities of Maasai girls. It has also been instrumental in establishing programmes and policies that promote gender equality and educational access in marginalized groups.

At the Women's Studies in Religion Program at Harvard Divinity School, she conducted a research project titled 'The Kingdom of Holy Women: Pentecostalism, Sex and Women's Bodies in An African Church.

Parsitau has published over 30 opinion pieces, briefs and policy blogs, in both digital and print media. She is also a columnist for The Elephant, where she has written articles on Gender, Church and politics.

Her articles examine the intersections between religion, women's bodies and sexualities' and also on sociology of religion, gender and feminist studies, anthropology, politics and media, have been published in regional and international journals. Her article titled "Arise, Oh Ye Daughters of Faith", Women Pentecostalism and Public Culture in Kenya highlights how women have assumed leadership positions in Pentecostal and charismatic movements in Kenya, unlike in Kenyan public life.

== Community involvement ==
Parsitau is involved in promoting equitable development for girls, women, and other vulnerable communities in Kenya. Having overcome structural barriers to obtain an education, she advocates for girls living in Maasailand in Kenya's arid and semi-arid regions who face many challenges in accessing education. She is the founder and CEO of two nonprofit organizations Let Maasai Girls Learn an initiative that seeks to rally local, regional and global action for girls education throughout Massailand in Kenya.

She advocates for girls education in the Maasai community where many girls are not enrolling in school nor completing school due to childhood marriage, teenage pregnancy, preference for boys and lack of role models. High illiteracy levels propelled her to ensure Maasai boys and especially girls obtained education, as they were affected by sexual harassment, physical and gender-based violence and child neglect. Her efforts have had a positive impact on the community, enabling young Maasai females to follow their academic aspirations.

Her research on girls education showed, well-meaning governmental and non-governmental interventions intended to help Maasai girls have alienated elders and overlooked the value of community-led solutions grounded in existing Maasai social and cultural capital.

Parsitau advocates for the development of a just society that ensures women and girls have equal opportunities and has focused on inspiring social and gendered change in her Maasai community and beyond.

As a community mobilizer, she also founded Kenya Women Rising and Youth and Transformational Leadership Development Programmes, which are leadership and mentorship incubation programs that invest in women and youth.

== Selected works ==
=== Books ===
- Parsitau, D.S., Adogame, A., Bauman, C. and Yip, J. (2024). The Handbook of Megachurch Studies. Routledge, Taylor Francis Group.
- Parsitau, D. S. (2021). The Kingdom of Holy Women, Pure Girls and Born-Again Bodies: Pentecostalism, Sex and Women Bodies in an African Church. Leiden Brill Publishers.

=== Chapters ===
- Parsitau, D.S. (2020). "Praying for Husbands: Single Women Negotiating Faith and Patriarchy in Contemporary Kenya". The Palgrave Handbook of African Social Ethics. Cham: Palgrave Macmillan. pp. 69–91.
- Parsitau, D.S.; Murunga, G. (2020). "Engaging Youth for a Culture of Peace and Security in Kenya: The Role of Faith Based/Inspired Organizations and other Non-State Actors". In Tarusarira, J.; Chitando, E. (eds.). Themes in Religion and Human Security in Africa. Taylor and Francis Group.
- Parsitau, D.S. (2014). "Pentecostalising the Church of Scotland? The Presbyterian Church of East Africa (PCEA) and the Pentecostal Challenge in Kenya (1970–2010)". In Adogame, A.; Lawrence, A. (eds.). Scotland in Africa, Africa in Scotland: Historical Legacies and Contemporary Hybridities. Netherlands: Leiden Brill. pp. 230–252.
- Parsitau, D.S. & Mwaura, and P.N. (2013). Gendered Charisma: Women in Mission in Neo-Pentecostal and Charismatic Movements in Kenya in Lieneman-Perrin (et al.) (eds.). Putting Names with Faces: Women’s Impact in Mission History. Abingdon Press, 123–146.
- Parsitau, D.S. (2012). "Agents of Gendered Change: NGOs and Pentecostal Movements as Agents of Social Transformation in Urban Kenya". In Freeman, D. (ed.). The Pentecostal Ethic and the Spirit of Development: Churches, NGO and Social Change in Neo-Liberal Africa. Palgrave Macmillan. pp. 203–220.
- Parsitau, D.S. & Mwaura, P.N. (2012). Perceptions of Women's Health and Rights in Christian New Religious Movements in Kenya. In Adogame, A. (ed.). African Traditions in the Study of Religion in Africa: Emerging Trends in Indigenous Spirituality and the Interface with other world. Ashgate Publishers, 175–186.
- Parsitau, D.S. (2011). Rethinking the Socio-Political Impact and Significance of Pentecostal Christianity in Kenya (1970–2009). In Ndarangwi, M.N. (ed.). Jesus and Ubuntu: Exploring the Social Impact of Christianity in Africa. Trenton, New Jersey: Africa World Press, 23–145.
- Parsitau, D.S. (2008). "The Impact of Structural Adjustments Programmes (SAPS) on the Health Status of Women in Kenya". In Sama, M.; Vinh-Kim, N. (eds.). Governing Health Systems in Africa. Dakar: CODESRIA. pp. 191–200.

=== Articles ===
- Parsitau, D. S. (2021). "Law, Religion and the Politicization of Sexual Citizenship in Kenya". Journal of Law and Religion. 36 (1): 105–129.
- Parsitau, D.S. (2019). "Women without Limits and Limited Women: Pentecostal Women Navigating between Empowerment and Disempowerment". Journal for the Study of the Religions of Africa and its Diaspora. 5 (1).
- Parsitau, D. S. and Van Klinken, (2018). Pentecostal Intimacies: Women and Intimate Citizenship in the Ministry of Repentance and Holiness in Kenya. Citizenship Studies, 22(6), 586-602.
- Parsitau, D S., Wane, N.N. and Nyokangi, D.N (2018). Dangerous Spaces: Kenya's Public Universities as Locus for Sexual and Gender Based Violence: A Case Study of Egerton University, Njoro Campus. Canadian Women Studies (CWS), 32(1, 2), 21–28.
- Parsitau, D.S., Chitando, E. and Nyamnjoh, H.M. (2017). “Citizens of both Heaven and Earth”: Pentecostalism and Social Transformation in South Africa, Zimbabwe and Kenya in Alternation Special Edition 19, 232–251.
- Parsitau D.S. and Schenectady, G. D. (2017). Empowered to Submit: Pentecostal Women in Nairobi Navigation Culture. Journal of Religion and Society. 19, 1–17.
- Parsitau, D. S. (2011). The Role of Faith and Faith Based Organizations among Internally Displaced Persons in Kenya. Oxford Journal of Refugee Studies, 24 (3), 493–512.
- Parsitau, D.S. (2011). Arise oh ye Daughters of Faith: Pentecostalism, Women and Public Culture in Kenya. In England, H. (ed.). Christianity and Public Culture in Africa, Ohio University Press,131- 148.
- Parsitau, D.S., Kamaara, E.K, Gumo-Kurgat & Kayeli, E. (2010). “Doing Theology in the Context of Globalization: Perspectives from Kenya,” Concilium, Asian Centre for Cross-Cultural Studies. XLVI, 141–164.
- Parsitau, D.S., and Mwaura, P. N. (2010). “God in the City”: Pentecostalism as an Urban Phenomenon in Kenya. Studia Historiae Ecclesiaticae (SHE) Journal of the Church History Society of Southern Africa, University of Pretoria 36 (2),95-112.
- Parsitau, D.S. (2009). ‘Keep Holy Distance and Abstain till He Comes’: Interrogating a Pentecostal Church Discourses and Engagements with HIV/AIDS and the Youth in Kenya, Africa Today. 56. (1). 45–64.
- Parsitau, D.S. and Kinyanjui, F. K. (2009). The Role of Pentecostal and Charismatic Churches in Kenya's 2007 General Elections. Orita, Ibadan Journal of Religious Studies. XLI/II,158-178.
- Parsitau, D.S. (2008). "'Sounds of Change and Reform': The Appropriation of Gospel Music in Political Process in Kenya". 'Studies in World Christianity' Series. 14 (1). University of Edinburgh: 55–72.
- Parsitau, D.S. (2007). "'From the Periphery to the Centre': the Pentecostalization of Mainline Christianity in Kenya". Missionalia: Southern African Journal of Missiology. 35 (3): 83–111. doi:10.10520/EJC76026.
