= Integration of faith and learning =

The integration of faith and learning is a focus of many religious institutions of higher education. The broad concept encompasses the idea that the Christian worldview, faith, and practices of the student should be deeply connected within the learning experience. That said, different educators build their own visions of education onto the concept, what some call conceptions of faith learning integration. This idea is commonly found in Christian colleges in the United States, and is considered by some to be the essence of Christian higher education. PABATS, the accrediting association for Bible colleges in the Philippines has also shown interest in faith-learning integration. Christian Colleges of Southeast Asia, Southern Philippines Baptist Theological Seminary, Halls of Life Bible College, Davao Bible College and Koinonia Theological Seminary are now practicing faith and learning integration.

== History ==
Higher education in the United States began largely as a Christian endeavor. Nearly all of the colleges founded during the colonial period were founded and supported by the dominant Christian denominations of the time.

Some scholars claim that the current model of American higher education is convoluted because it has worked to separate faith from learning.

== See also ==
- Religiosity and education
- Secularization
