= Calvin University =

Christian university in Grand Rapids, Michigan, US

Coordinates: 42°55′49″N 85°35′17″W

- Former names: Calvin College and Seminary (1876–1906); John Calvin Junior College (1906–1931); Calvin College (1931–2019)
- Motto: My heart I offer to you, O Lord, promptly and sincerely
- Type: Private university
- Established: August 4, 1876; 150 years ago
- Religious affiliation: Christian Reformed Church
- Academic affiliations: Calvin Theological Seminary; CCCU; CIC; IAPCHE; Space-grant
- Endowment: $296.5 million (2025)
- President: Gregory Elzinga
- Provost: Kevin den Dulk (interim)
- Faculty: 328
- Students: 3,256
- Location: Grand Rapids, Michigan, U.S.
- Campus: Suburban, 390 acres (160 ha)
- Colors: Maroon and gold
- Nickname: Knights
- Sporting affiliations: NCAA Division III – MIAA
- Website: calvin.edu
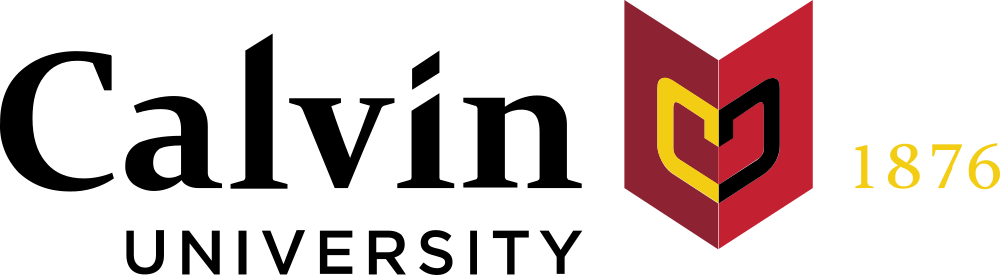

Calvin University is a private Christian university in Grand Rapids, Michigan, United States. Founded in 1876, Calvin University is an educational institution of the Christian Reformed Church and stands in the Reformed (Calvinist) tradition. Known as Calvin College for most of its history, the school is named after John Calvin, the 16th-century Protestant Reformer.

== History ==
The Christian Reformed Church in North America founded the school on August 4, 1876, as part of Calvin College and Theological Seminary (with the seminary becoming Calvin Theological Seminary) to train church ministers. The college and seminary began with seven students, in a rented upper room on Spring Street, in Grand Rapids, Michigan, with Geert Boer as the docent. The initial six-year curriculum included four years of literary studies and two years of theology. In 1892, the campus moved to the intersection of Madison Avenue and Franklin Street (Fifth Avenue) in Grand Rapids. In September 1894, the school expanded the curriculum for those who were not pre-theological students, effectually making the institution a college preparatory school. In 1900, the curriculum further broadened, making it more attractive to students interested in teaching or preparing for professional courses at universities, and Albertus Rooks became the school's principal. In 1901, Calvin admitted the first women to the school.

In 1906, the literary department of the college became known as John Calvin Junior College and the college held its first commencement. The student newspaper Chimes was first published in 1907. Around 1910, the west Michigan cities of Muskegon and Kalamazoo fought to have Calvin relocate to their respective cities. Muskegon offered US$10,000 (approximately $260,000 in 2015 dollars) and a tract of land to attract the college. The city of Grand Rapids countered with its own $10,000 offer and the junior college chose to stay in Grand Rapids. In time, the two-year college became a four-year college. In 1917, John Calvin Junior College moved to the Franklin Street Campus, which was the southeast edge of Grand Rapids at the time. Two years later the college appointed its first official president, the Rev. J.J. Hiemenga.

Then a year later, in 1920, the college officially transitioned into a four-year college following the liberal arts philosophy of the Free University in Amsterdam as laid out by Dutch theologian and statesman Abraham Kuyper. The next year the college awarded its first bachelor's degree. In 1924, with the opening of Grand Rapids Christian High School, the college offered its last year of college preparatory education, turned its focus exclusively to higher education, and opened its first dormitory. In 1925, the college began a teacher training program and, in 1926, appointed its first female faculty member, Johanna Timmer, as Dean of Women. The college dedicated its library, the Hekman Library on March 8, 1928. The college later dedicated its seminary building at the Franklin Street Campus on October 29, 1930. Still under the leadership of Rev. Hiemenga the college faced significant trouble during the Great Depression as financial hardship beset the college.

Although the school grew slowly in those early years, by 1930 it had reached its pre-World War I size of 350–450 students. Like many colleges in the United States, the end of the war led to the fastest enrollment increase in Calvin's history. By 1950 the enrollment had climbed to 1,270 and Calvin joined the M.I.A.A. The enrollment increase led to space limitations at the Franklin Campus. William Spoelhoef became president of Calvin in 1951.

In 1956, the Synod of the Christian Reformed Church authorized the college to purchase the Knollcrest Farm from J.C. Miller for $400,000 (approximately $3.6 million in 2018). Located beyond the Grand Rapids city limits at the time, the Knollcrest farm increased Calvin's campus from approximately one large city block to 390 acres (160 hectares) with a 100-acre (40 ha) nature preserve. Many were reticent about the project and the college's ability to finance it, but Spoelhof pursued the initiative. The Theological Seminary was first to move to the new campus since it did not need to be close to the rest of the college, building a new academic building and holding classes there starting in 1960. As space constraints became more noticeable on the Franklin campus, the college built its first academic building on the Knollcrest Campus and first held classes there in 1962. For the next 10 years, the college continued to operate at both the Knollcrest and Franklin campuses, until fully transitioning to the Knollcrest Campus in 1973. During the latter decades of the 20th century, Calvin grew to around 4,200 students. In 1991, the seminary and the college established separate boards of trustees.

At the turn of the millennium, Calvin began several new construction projects. Among these were a new communications and political science building, a conference center and hotel. In 2006, Calvin announced an expansion of the Fieldhouse which was completed in the spring of 2009. Shortly after, in 2010, Calvin completed an extensive renovation and expansion of the Fine Arts Center, thereafter rededicated as the Covenant Fine Arts Center.

The school made national headlines in 2005 when US President George W. Bush served as commencement speaker. Reactions among students and faculty were mixed. More than 800 faculty members, alumni, students and friends of the school signed a full-page ad in the Grand Rapids Press, saying that Bush's policies "...violate many deeply held principles of Calvin College".

In the summer of 2008, The Capella of Calvin College, the concert choir of Calvin under the direction of professor Joel Navarro, earned two third prizes in the Mixed and Free Category at the 37th Florilege Vocal de Tours Competition in Tours, France.

In August 2009, the college's board of trustees issued a controversial memo to all employees that said that faculty were prohibited from teaching, writing about, or advocating on behalf of homosexuality or homosexual issues such as same-sex marriage. Many faculty members were critical of the policy and of the way it was adopted without consultation by the board. The faculty senate, by a vote of 36–4, asked the board to withdraw the memo. The official policy of the college continues to be that the "proper place" for sexual relations is a "marriage relationship between a man and a woman".

In June 2012, the Synod of the Christian Reformed Church of North America voted to appoint Michael K. Le Roy as the president of Calvin College, succeeding President Gaylen J. Byker. Within months of assuming office, President Le Roy disclosed that Calvin faced a financial crisis, with $117 million in debt at the time. As part of the debt reduction plan, Calvin raised $25 million in eight months to reduce its long-term debt to $90 million. It continues to implement cost-cutting measures. In September 2015, four lightly enrolled majors were reduced to minors and one minor eliminated, marking the final step in academic division prioritization.

Calvin College changed its name to Calvin University on July 10, 2019, a date that matches the 510th birthday of John Calvin, the college's namesake. As an institution that already had numerous departments and centers, it was hoped that a name change to Calvin University would make the college more attractive to potential students as, internationally, colleges are considered a lower academic category than a university.

In 2021, the university ended several "underperforming" majors and minors, citing financial strain. The programs cut included the astronomy minor, Chinese major and minor, classical studies major and minor, Greek minor, Latin minor, Dutch major and minor, German major, and global development studies major and minor. This included dismissing tenured faculty members.

President Le Roy announced he would step down on June 10, 2021. On March 8, 2022, the Calvin University Board of Trustees announced the appointment of Wiebe Boer as the 12th president of Calvin College, succeeding Michael Le Roy.

In July 2023, the university announced that it was acquiring the Compass College of Film and Media in the fall of 2023. It will become part of the university's communication school.

In February 2024, Wiebe Boer resigned from the position of president facing allegations of "concerning and inappropriate conduct". Vice President of Advancement Gregory Elzinga was appointed interim president. Boer and his wife Joanna retaliated in April with a federal lawsuit against Calvin University, alleging defamation and breach of contract, including a list of complaints against Calvin in its handling of his resignation and its actions prior. In June, the Boers dropped their suit against Calvin. The Calvin Board of Trustees and the Boers issued a joint statement, saying that "the Board and the Boers had resolved the matter, and the Boers have dropped their legal actions."

In October 2024, the Calvin board of trustees announced that Gregory Elzinga would serve as Calvin's 13th president after serving as the university's interim president since February 2024.

In November 2025, citing financial strain, president Gregory Elzinga announced a 12.5% reduction in faculty headcount within the next two years. As part of this reduction, the university also decided to eliminate the French and sociology majors, as well as minors in German and journalism.

== Academics ==
Calvin University is accredited by the Higher Learning Commission. Calvin offers majors or minors in over 100 academic or pre-professional fields and ten graduate programs. Its most popular undergraduate majors, in terms of 2023 graduates, were:

Engineering (79)
Registered Nurse/Registered Nursing (66)
Elementary Education & Teaching (40)
Accounting (31)
Computer Science (30)
Lay Ministry (30)

Calvin is a member of the Council for Christian Colleges and Universities and as an institution in the Calvinist tradition, subscribes to a theology that produces a high regard for participating in and forming culture.

=== Admissions ===
Undergraduate admissions statistics
- 2021 entering class
- Admit rate: 91.6 (2,992 out of 3,267)
- Yield rate: 24.6 (736 out of 2,992)

Test scores middle 50%^{[i]}
- SAT Total: 1130-1330 (among 61% of FTFs)
- ACT Composite: 24-30 (among 24% of FTFs)

For the Class of 2025 (enrolled fall 2021), Calvin University received 3,267 applications and accepted 2,992 (91.6%). Of those accepted, 736 enrolled, a yield rate (the percentage of accepted students who choose to attend the university) of 24.6%. Calvin University's freshman retention rate is 86%, with 77.1% going on to graduate within six years.

Of the 61% of the incoming freshman class who submitted SAT scores; the middle 50 percent Composite scores were 1130–1330. Of the 24% of enrolled freshmen in 2021 who submitted ACT scores; the middle 50 percent Composite score was between 24 and 30.

Together with Michigan State University, Michigan Technological University, Wayne State University, Hillsdale College, Kalamazoo College, and Hope College, Calvin University is one of the seven college-sponsors of the National Merit Scholarship Program in the state. The university sponsored 5 Merit Scholarship awards in 2020. In the 2020–2021 academic year, 7 freshman students were National Merit Scholars.

=== Core curriculum ===
Academic rankings

Regional
- U.S. News & World Report: 3

National
- Forbes: 213

Calvin has a core curriculum with four parts: Foundations, Competencies & Skills, Knowledge & Understanding, and Cross-Disciplinary Integrations. The average student takes 45 hours of core courses in the course of a four-year degree at Calvin, though engineering majors and students in other professional programs have flexible ways to meet core requirements because some majors now require a higher number of credits to confer a degree.

The Capstone course, generally taken during the senior year, draws together themes and concepts from the core curriculum. Some Capstone courses are intended for students of specific majors, while others may be unrelated to a student's chosen major(s) and minor(s), such as PHIL 205: Ethics, which can qualify as the capstone course for students of any major, including non-philosophy majors.

=== Off-campus programs ===
Calvin offers a large number of off-campus programs and ranks 2nd among baccalaureate institutions for the number of students who study abroad each year.

==== Semester programs ====
Calvin runs 11 of its own off-campus semester programs. These programs are led by Calvin faculty to ensure that students receive the same caliber of education that they would receive on campus. These programs are offered in the United Kingdom, China, France, Germany, Ghana, Honduras, Hungary, Peru, Spain, and Washington, D.C.

Additionally, Calvin works with numerous other colleges to offer dozens of other off-campus programs around the world.

==== Off-campus interim ====
Calvin also offers a variety of off-campus programs during the one-month interim term that takes place each May. In 2017, Calvin offered 33 different off-campus programs around the world (this number fluctuates slightly each year).

== Campus ==
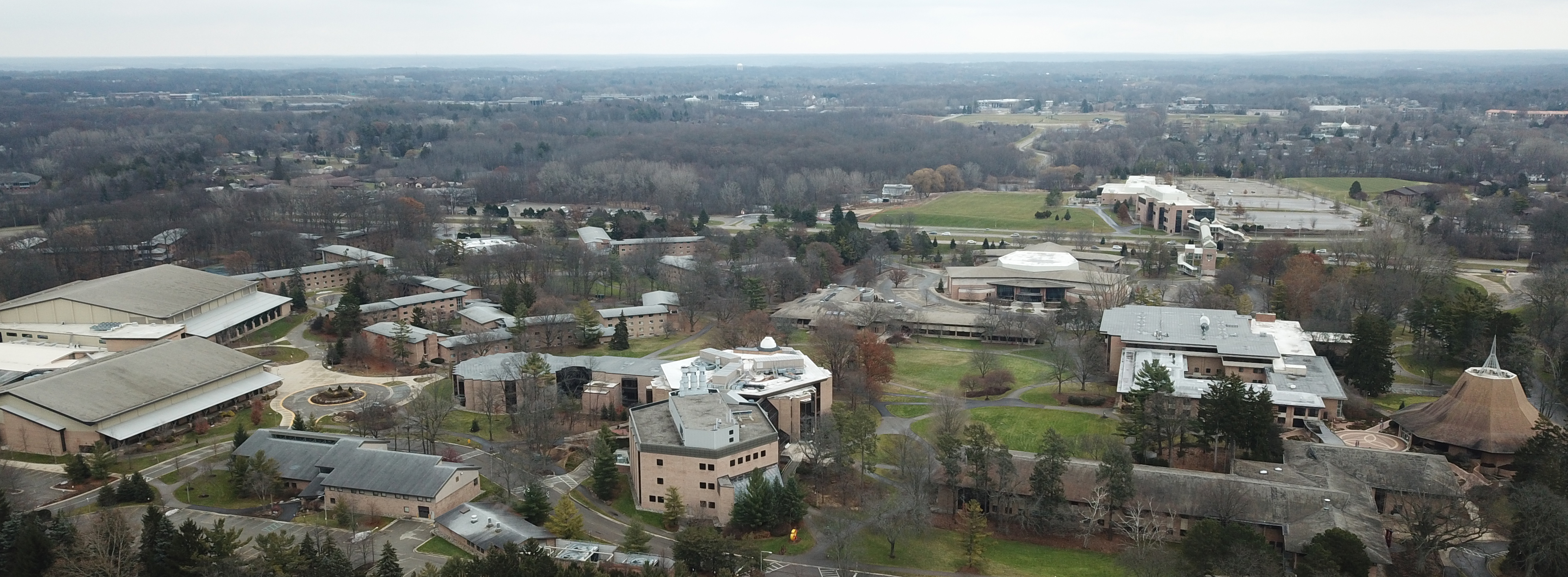
Aerial view of Calvin's campus

Calvin acquired the 166-acre (0.67 km^{2}) property in the mid-1950s and began a process of turning a biologically diverse farm into a center for Christian higher education. The master plan for the site was developed in 1957 by William Beye Fyfe, an adherent of the Prairie School of architecture. Working with President Spoelhof, Fyfe came up with a set of design principles for the campus aimed to symbolically represent and physically promote such ideals as the integration of faith and learning; integration of administration, faculty, and students; and the inter-relatedness of all the disciplines.

=== Academic buildings ===
Calvin has nine academic buildings on campus.

The first to be constructed was Hiemenga Hall, named after John Hiemenga and built in 1961. Hiemenga Hall houses academic departments including modern languages, history, philosophy, classical languages, gender studies, and religion. The building also houses some programs and offices. It is connected to the campus chapel and the Spoelhof Center via tunnels.

The Spoelhof Center, named after president emeritus William Spoelhof, houses the art, education, social work and sociology departments, the Office of the President, and several other administrative departments. The Gezon Auditorium is also housed in the Spoelhof Center. Dedicated in 1974, the Gezon Auditorium primarily serves as the main stage for the Calvin Theatre Company. Like the CFAC, it has flexible lighting and sound systems and serves as a venue for concerts, lectures and other events. The Spoelhof Center connects to the Science Building and Hiemenga Hall via tunnels.

The Science Building houses many of the science departments at Calvin, including engineering, physics, astronomy, psychology and nursing. The building also includes half of the Calvin-Rehoboth Robotic Observatory. When there are favorable skies, the observatory is open to the public on most weeknights. The Science Building is also distinctive for having been designed in the shape of a hexagon, emulating the benzene ring. In 2009, it was the backdrop for scenes of the film The Genesis Code.

Constructed in 1998, DeVries Hall houses classrooms, faculty offices, research labs and a greenhouse. In addition to the biology and chemistry departments, the building houses the West Michigan Regional Lab, a consortium between the college and local hospital, Spectrum Health.

Attached to DeVries Hall and the Science Building is North Hall, which houses several departments including economics, business, geology, geography, environmental studies, computer science, and mathematics.

To the west of North Hall is the Engineering Building which consists of the Prince Engineering Design Center and the Vermeer Engineering Projects Center. The Engineering Building was constructed in 1999 and houses faculty and student research facilities, metal and wood shops, a wind tunnel, a three-dimensional printer, and an anechoic chamber.

The Spoelhof Fieldhouse Complex, located on the north end of campus, houses a number of classrooms and the Kinesiology department. The fieldhouse underwent a major renovation and expansion in 2009.

The Covenant Fine Arts Center is one of the most recognizable buildings on campus, given its giant heptagon shape. Designed around the central auditorium, which seats 1,011, the CFAC houses the music and English departments. The CFAC auditorium is the preeminent musical performance space on campus featuring exceptional acoustics. At the back of the stage is the 39 rank, 32 stop mechanical action organ built by Schlicker Organ Company in 1966. Since its opening, the CFAC has hosted over 18,000 events. The auditorium is designed for versatility and is equipped with acoustical curtains, shifting acoustic deflection panels, a stage lift, and three catwalks. The building was closed for 2009–2010 for extensive remodeling.

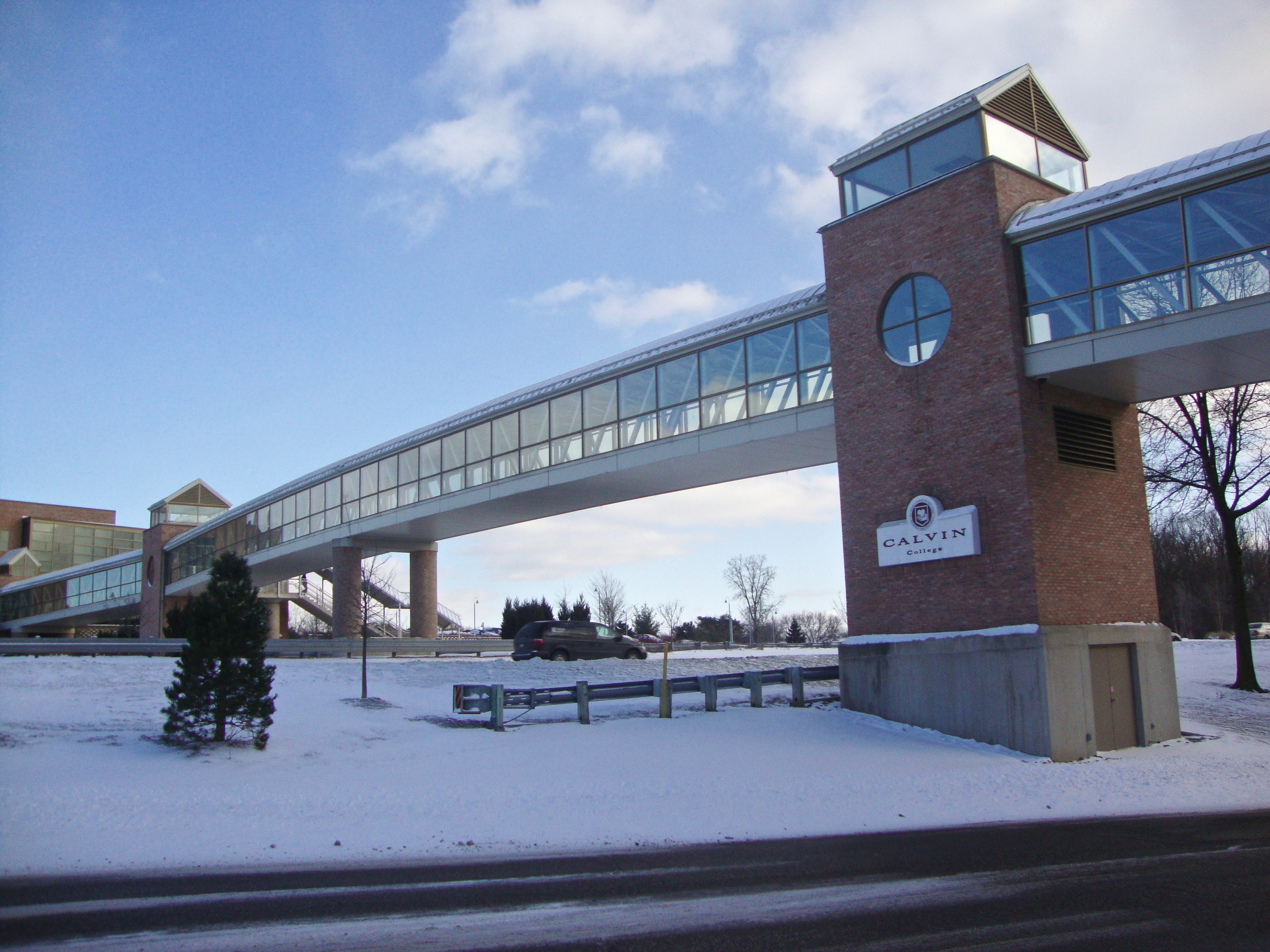
Calvin Crossing

In 2002, the DeVos Communication Center was constructed across the East Beltline Road. It is connected to west campus by the Calvin Crossing bridge. The building's upper-level houses department and faculty offices for both the political science and communications arts and sciences departments. Additionally, there is a suite of audiology and speech pathology classrooms and facilities including a working clinic. The lower level of the building features media production and consumption facilities such as the Bytwerk Video Theatre, an audio studio, sound stage, control room, and editing suites for audio and video production. The ground floor features classrooms, a public atrium, and a snack shop.

In March 2021, the university began construction on a new building to house the Calvin University School of Business. The building resides on the east side of the campus, next to the DeVos Communication Center. The Business Department Chair envisions classrooms designed specifically for case studies, a new computer lab, breakout rooms, a hospitality area, seminars with local businesspeople, and study spaces.

=== Hekman Library ===
Beginning in 1917 with 3,500 volumes, Calvin's "library room" eventually became the modern Hekman Library now holding over one million volumes. The collection's emphasis is on works in the traditional liberal arts disciplines. The library's strongest collections are in Theology, Religion, American literature, British literature, and Philosophy.

In terms of books, serial backfiles, and other paper materials held, Hekman Library, as of 2013, is the largest private academic library in the state.

The H. Henry Meeter Center for Calvin Studies is located in the Hekman Library. The center specializes in John Calvin and Calvinism. With many rare items, books, manuscripts, articles and literature, the Meeter Center is the largest collection of Calvin materials in North America.

=== Athletic facilities ===
The Spoelhof Fieldhouse Complex is home to the combined health, physical education, recreation, dance and sport department. In Spring 2007, the college began a $50 million construction project to renovate and expand the Calvin Fieldhouse. The fieldhouse reopened in Spring 2009 as the Spoelhof Fieldhouse Complex. The 362,000 square feet (33,600 m^{2}) facility includes a new 5,000-seat arena (Van Noord Arena) which is currently the largest arena in a Division III school, an Olympic-regulation swimming pool (Venema Aquatic Center) which seats about 550, a tennis and track center (Huizenga Tennis and Track Center) containing 4 tennis courts and a 200-meter track, 14,000 square feet (1,300 m^{2}) of weight training rooms and a custom made rock climbing wall. The Hoogenboom Health and Recreation Center contains the original renovated gym that is now used for basketball, volleyball, PE classes, intramurals, and concerts. The Hoogenboom Center has two dance studios as well as racquetball courts and exercise science laboratories.

=== Chapel ===
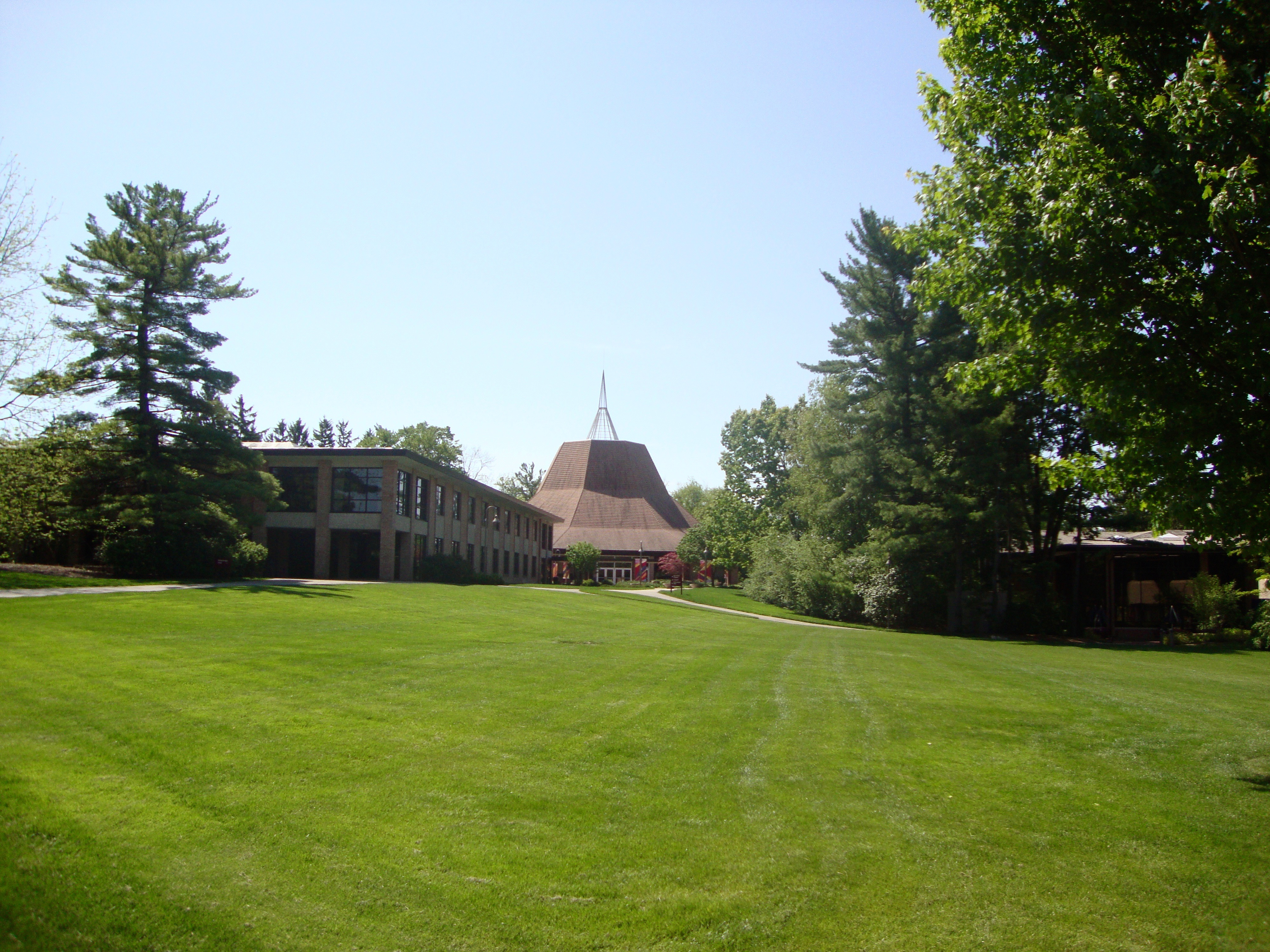
Calvin University Chapel

Though always part of the master plan, the chapel was not built until the late 1980s. It holds daily services in a protected time slot to ensure that all students and faculty members are able to attend the 20 minute worship services if they so choose. Chapel services follow a weekly rhythm and each day of the week has a different theme (Believe, Behold, Belong, Be Still, and Be Loud).

Designed by GMB Architects, the chapel sits at the highest point of the academic circle and its spire rises above all of the academic buildings. Shaped as an octagon, with seating in the round, the chapel offers exceptional acoustics for both instrumental and vocal music, in addition to the spoken word. The chapel also features a large organ built by Dobson Pipe Organ Builders. The three manual instrument uses mechanical key action with a detached console. The facade pipes, made of 75% burnished tin, conceal some 2,500 pipes. In addition to the sanctuary, the chapel has small prayer rooms, meeting spaces, a kitchen, theatre storage and rehearsal spaces.

A tunnel system connecting to the Spoelhof Center creates an outdoor plaza at ground level and the multi-use Lab Theatre below. The Lab Theatre is a blackbox theatre built in 1988 as a part of the chapel building project.

=== Bunker Interpretive Center ===
The Bunker Interpretive Center is located in Calvin's nature preserve and serves as the home base for formal programs and an educational resource for the approximately 5,000 casual visitors that the Calvin University Ecosystem Preserve & Native Gardens receives annually. The Bunker Interpretive Center is Gold LEED certified.

=== Bruce Dice Mineralogical Museum ===
The Bruce Dice Mineralogical Museum is located on the first floor of North Hall. It opened in 2012 after a collection of over 300 minerals and fossils was donated by 1948 alumnus Bruce B. Dice. The Museum serves as a home for the collection and an outreach resource for local school and hobby groups, as well as hosting casual visitors during open hours. The Museum is known for its collection of Cretaceous fossils from Lebanon.

== Centers and institutes ==
Centers include the Calvin Center for Christian Scholarship (CCCS), the Calvin Center for Faith and Writing (CCFW), the Calvin Center for Innovation in Business (CCIB), the Center for Social Research (CSR), the H. Henry Meeter Center for Calvin Studies, and the Van Lunen Center: Executive Management in Christian Schools. Institutes include the Calvin Institute of Christian Worship (CICW), The Clean Water Institute (CWI), the Kuyers Institute for Christian Teaching and Learning, the Nagel Institute for the Study of World Christianity, and the Paul B. Henry Institute for the Study of Christianity and Politics.

== Student life ==
=== Student body ===
In 2021, Calvin University had approximately 3,681 students, 53% female and 47% male. The average class size was 23 and there was a 13:1 student/faculty ratio. Michigan residents comprised 55% of the student body and 12% of the students were from other countries. 224 full-time faculty taught at the college and 90.6% had obtained the terminal degree in their field.

=== Residence life ===
Calvin has six residence halls on campus which house the majority of the freshman and sophomore classes, as the college has a policy that requires most first and second year students to live on campus. First and second year students may live off-campus if they lodge with their parents, it has been more than two years since their high school graduation date, or if they qualify for a rare exception. The university also has two residence halls dedicated to upper-class housing, as well as eight upper-class apartment complexes on the east side of campus.

Kalsbeek-Huizenga-van Reken Hall houses three Living-Learning communities, each aligned with one of Calvin's signature Cohorts. Each Living-Learning floor has a specific theme and a co-ed residence structure, along with theme-specific programming and events. Students who wish to live on one of the three floors must usually submit a separate application the spring semester before moving onto the floor.

One of the most notable events put on by residence life is "Chaos Day", during which the residents of each of the halls have their own theme, decorate their dorm, and dress in costumes to compete in a number of relay races and similar games. The dorm building Schultze-Eldersveld has traditionally dominated the Chaos Day competition and has the most victories of any hall.

=== Student Activities Office and The Calvin Concert Series ===
The Student Activities Office at Calvin plans and hosts many films, concerts, and lectures to foster cultural engagement and discernment in a Christian context. The Student Activities Office shows a wide variety of popular and lesser-known films throughout the year. Admission to these films, hosted in the Covenant Fine Arts Center, is $1.

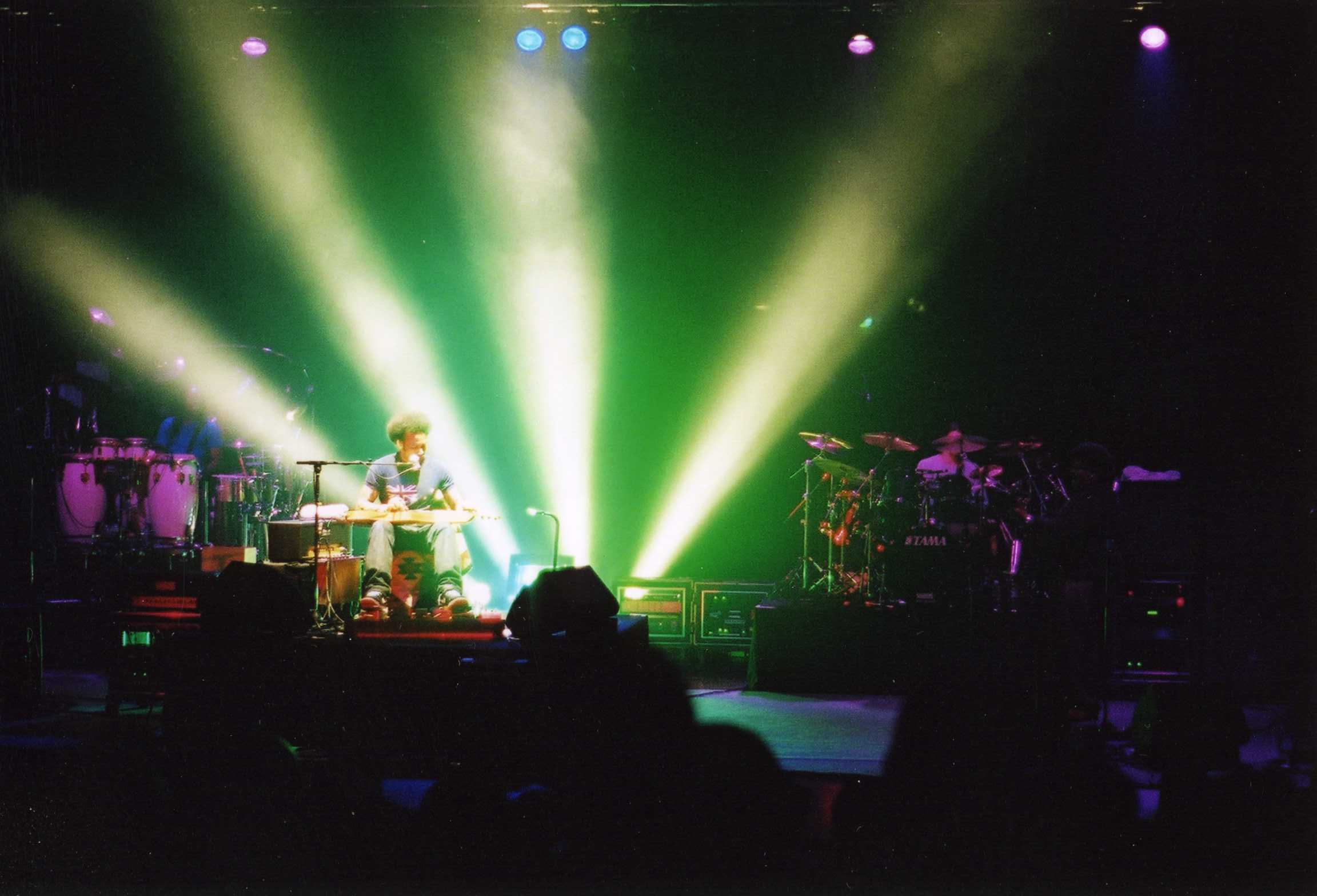
Ben Harper and the Innocent Criminals live at Calvin College, 2000

Calvin is also notable for its extensive concert series. Before each concert, Calvin hosts a question and answer session with students and the artist. These sessions are meant to give artists a way to converse with students about their music and art. Calvin has hosted a variety of acts including: Fun., Switchfoot, Death Cab for Cutie, Sufjan Stevens, MuteMath, Gungor, MGMT, the Soil & the Sun, Twin Forks, Ingrid Michaelson, Home Free, Regina Spektor, Over the Rhine, Anberlin, Jon Foreman, Peter Rollins and David Bazan, Kishi Bashi, All Sons & Daughters, NEEDTOBREATHE, Shad, Miracles of Modern Science, Diego Garcia, San Fermin, The Brilliance, Delorean, Pop Scholars, Okkervil River, The Head and The Heart, The National, Julianna Barwick, Lone Bellow, The Milk Carton Kids, Lily & Madeleine, Lecrae, and John Mayer. The January Series also offers a wide selection of authors, singers, and musicians.

Because of its extensive and varied concert series, the Student Activities Office has faced controversy over the years. In September 2010, the college canceled a concert by Canadian indie rock band, The New Pornographers. According to an official statement released by Calvin, the concert was cancelled after several complaints were made due to the band's name referring to pornography. Fun.'s advocacy of gay marriage was also met with significant controversy when Calvin hosted them in 2012.

=== Safety ===
Campus security and parking policy enforcement services are provided by Calvin University's Campus Safety Department. Some Calvin University campus safety officers have been armed with firearms since 2008, a decision that the Campus Safety Department director William Corner describes as a response to concerns that the college was not adequately prepared to respond to a similar event following the 2007 Virginia Tech campus shooting. Initially, only Campus Safety supervisors who were former law enforcement and fully licensed to carry firearms on a school campus were permitted to carry firearms on Calvin's campus. At that time, all campus safety supervisors were issued collapsible batons, chemical spray, and handcuffs as standard policy, even if they were not armed with a firearm.

At the time and until 2017, non-supervisory Campus Safety officers were student employees who performed their duties unarmed. In 2017, the Campus Safety Department discontinued hiring students for non-supervisory campus safety officer roles, electing instead to hire former law enforcement officers who were licensed to carry firearms on campus. The department continued to employ students as dispatchers, building security officers, and customer service staff. The Campus Safety Department director, William Corner, stated that student officers were not fully qualified for the risk level of some of the incidents they were responding too. "We were putting the students in positions that, honestly, I was not comfortable with for their safety and their level of experience."

In September 2014, full-time, non-student Calvin College campus safety personnel began wearing body cameras while on duty. Officers are required to turn on the cameras in specific circumstances.

In 2016, Calvin College was described as being a model for the arming of campus security staff at other smaller college institutions in the United States.

A Calvin College campus safety supervisor was criminally charged with "reckless use of a firearm" after a November 2016 on-duty incident. The armed supervisor, Lee Swafford, allegedly did not fire his duty firearm in the incident that resulted in his arrest, but after a routine review of body camera footage by the Campus Safety Department director, William Corner, the college placed Swafford on administrative leave pending the outcome of an internal investigation. After the investigation, Calvin College dismissed Swafford on December 6, 2016. The college forwarded its evidence to the Grand Rapids Police Department and Kent County prosecutors then laid charges in February 2017. After the police issued a warrant for his arrest, Swafford turned himself in and was released on bail. In an open letter to college students, faculty, staff and visitors, college president Michael Le Roy described the officer's actions as "deeply disappointing to me." He also stated that the incident had involved a campus visitor, not a student or staff member. Swafford pled guilty to a misdemeanor charge of reckless use of firearms on June 5, 2017 and was sentenced to a $300 fine.

Calvin University implemented a "one button" campus lockdown system in 2017. The new Lenel system can lock down every exterior door on the college campus with the push of a single button. The college has also offered active shooter response training to some staff and students.

== Athletics ==
Calvin University fields 10 men's and 11 women's intercollegiate teams and several club sports, known as the Calvin Knights. Men's volleyball became the 22nd varsity sport in the 2023–2024 school year.

== Publications ==
Students at Calvin publish a weekly student newspaper, Chimes, and a biannual journal of arts and letters commentary, Dialogue. A yearbook, Prism, is also published for each school year. Student filmmakers have also made many short films and videos, like the popular Lipdub at Calvin College and the super-low-budget adaptation of Homer's Iliad, Meynin, both in 2010.

The school distributes Knightfile, a seasonal magazine on sports at the college, Uncompressed, a cultural discussion publication, and Spark, a magazine for alumni and friends.

== Notable alumni ==
- M.I Abaga, Nigerian musician
- David Agema, 1971, Republican National Committeeman
- William Brashler, author of The Bingo Long Traveling All-Stars and Motor Kings
- Meindert DeJong, a Dutch-born American writer of children's books who won the Hans Christian Andersen Award
- Keith DeRose, Allison Foundation Professor of Philosophy at Yale University
- Betsy DeVos, former chair of the Republican party in Michigan and former Secretary of Education
- Richard DeVos, founder of Amway and Orlando Magic CEO
- Peter DeVries, 1931, editor and novelist
- William K. Frankena 1930, moral philosopher, chairman U. of Michigan philosophy department, distinguished alumnus
- Wayne Huizenga, businessman (attended)
- Bill Huizenga, U.S. Congressman
- Peter Kreeft, professor of philosophy and theology at Boston College
- Marc Evan Jackson, 1992, actor and comedian
- Paul Ronald Lambers, Medal of Honor Recipient – Vietnam War
- David LaGrand, 1988, Mayor of Grand Rapids and former Michigan State Representative
- Robert McRuer, 1988, Disability Studies Scholar and Professor of English, George Washington University
- Todd Martinez, 1989, theoretical chemist and professor
- Chris Molnar, writer, editor and publisher of Archway Editions
- Kunle Olukotun, father of the multi-core processor, Stanford computer science professor
- Jeannine Oppewall, 1968, Academy Award-nominated production designer
- Alvin Plantinga, theistic contemporary philosopher of religion
- Derk Pereboom, 1978, philosopher and Susan Linn Sage Professor at Cornell University
- Patricia Rozema, 1981, filmmaker
- Kenneth L. Ryskamp, 1951, U.S. Federal District Judge
- Paul Schrader, 1968, Academy Award-nominated screenwriter and filmmaker
- Wessel H. Smitter, novelist
- Carl Strikwerda, president of Elizabethtown College
- Jay Van Andel, businessman, co-founder of Amway
- John Van Engen 1969, professor of history and Haskins Medal winner
- Cornelius Van Til
- Jon Vander Ark, president of Republic Services
- David L. Vander Meulen, professor of English at the University of Virginia and editor of the journal of the Bibliographical Society of the University of Virginia
- John Witte Jr. 1982, Robert W. Woodruff Professor at Emory University School of Law

== Notable faculty ==
- Lionel Basney, Professor of English, poet, author, critic
- Johannes Broene, 1908–1925 teaching primarily in Philosophy and Education; also classes in History, Civics, Government, Chemistry, and Psychology
- Brian Diemer, 1986–Present, Head Cross Country Coach
- Kristin Kobes Du Mez, Professor of History, author of Jesus and John Wayne
- Vern Ehlers, 1966–1982, Professor of Physics, served as U.S. Representative from Grand Rapids
- John E. Hare, 1989–2003, Professor of Philosophy
- Paul B. Henry, 1970–1978, Professor of Political Science
- William Harry Jellema, 1920–1936, 1948–1963 founder of Calvin's Philosophy Department
- George Marsden, 1965–1986, 2010–present, Professor of History
- Richard Mouw, 1968–1985, Professor of Philosophy
- Damaris Parsitau, first African Woman President of the African Association for the Study of Religion and its Diaspora (AASR) and the first African Woman Director of the Nagel Institute for the Study of World Christianity at Calvin
- Alvin Plantinga, 1963–1981, Professor of Philosophy
- H. Evan Runner, 1951–1981, Professor of Philosophy
- Gary Schmidt, 1986–2023, Professor of English, awarded two Newbery Honor awards for his young-adult fiction
- James K.A. Smith, 2002–present, Professor of Philosophy
- William Spoelhof, 1946–1951, Professor of History and Political Science
- Ralph Stob, 1915–1964, Professor of Classics
- Howard J. Van Till, emeritus Professor of Physics
- Nicholas Wolterstorff, 1959–1989, Professor of Philosophy

== See also ==
- List of presidents of Calvin University
