= Aula Simfonia Jakarta =

Concert hall in Kemayoran, Jakarta

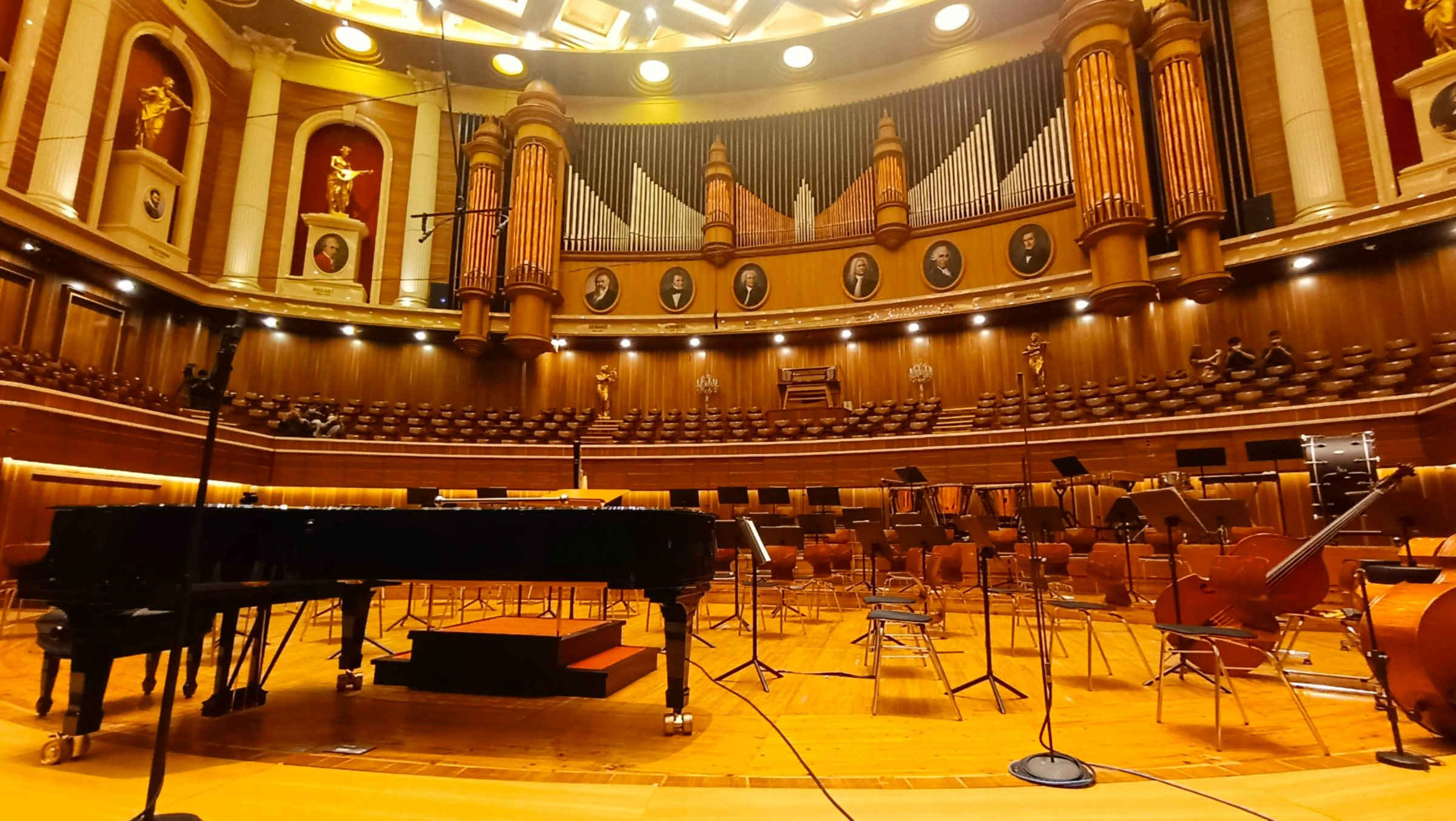
Inner view of Aula Simfonia Jakarta.

Aula Simfonia Jakarta is a 1,200-capacity concert hall in Kemayoran, Jakarta.

It is part of the Reformed Millennium Center Indonesia development, a development consisting of a megachurch, art gallery, library, school and theological college. Its principal conductor and artistic director is an Indonesian Reformed Evangelical Church evangelist, Stephen Tong. Jahja Ling, an Indonesian-Chinese of American citizenship, is artistic consultant.

The hall has featured not only Western classical but also Balinese gamelan performances. It features Indonesia's largest pipe organ, built by Casavant Frères.

== History ==
Aula Simfonia Jakarta officially opened in 2009, established without any funding from the government. Both local and international musicians have performed in this hall.

== Objective ==
This concert hall has never required any use of speakers during live music performances. Its layout and design were carefully made with a strategically layered ceiling to amplify the sound, as well as filtering out excess noise to achieve the rarely accomplished 35 dB (decibels).

The pipe organ is one of the oldest musical instruments with the most intricately-made components in the world. Aula Simfonia Jakarta possesses a Casavant Frères production from 1962 with 3217 pipes, with a total weight of more than 10 tons. Some of the organ pipes are used as a main decoration on the wall behind the music hall stage.

== Architecture ==
Aula Simfonia Jakarta is dominated by brown tones with different types of wood finishes, surrounded by paintings of celebrated composers and varied statues representing well-known musical instruments, illuminated by a crystal chandelier over the center stage.
