= SDCO =

SDCO may refer to:

- San Diego Chamber Orchestra
- Super Dimension Century Orguss
- The ICAO code for Sorocaba Airport
