= Jacobs Music Center =

Symphony hall in San Diego, California, US

Coordinates: 32.719024°N 117.157903°W

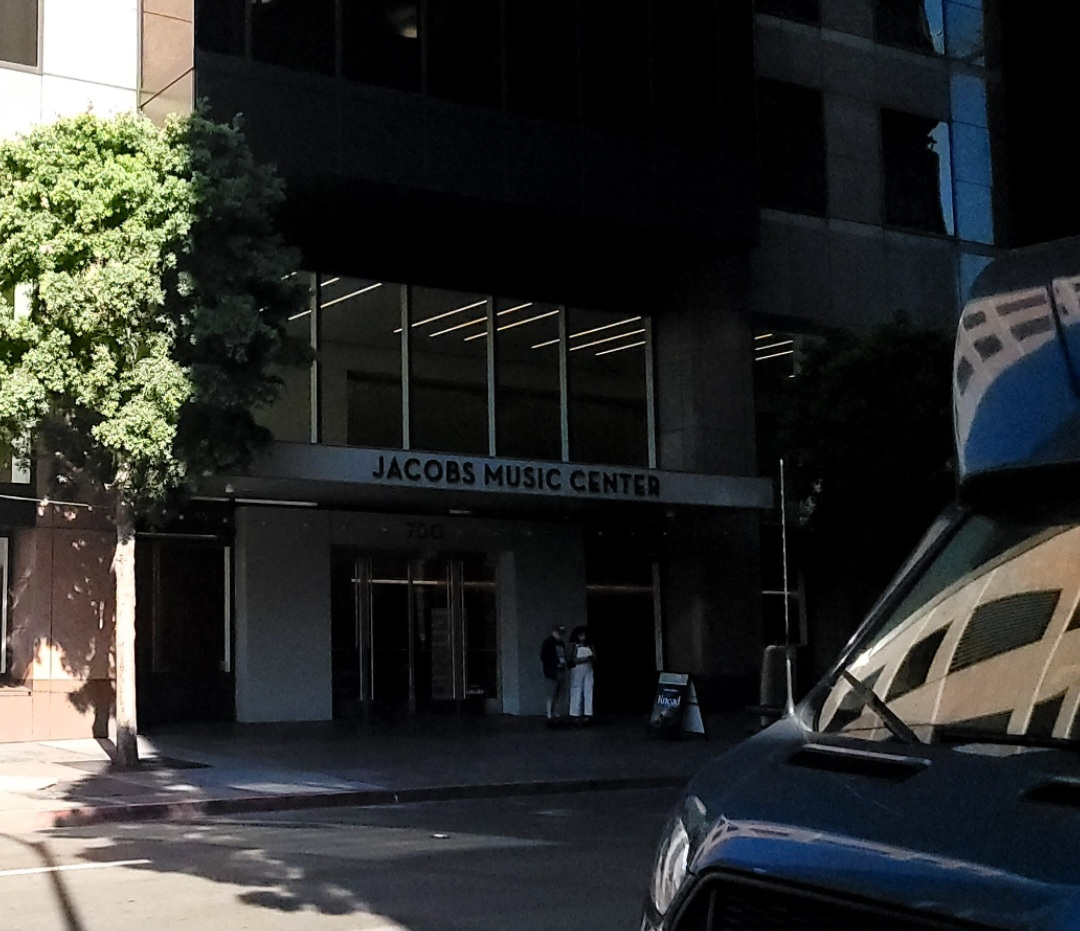
- Exterior view of the venue (2025)
- Interactive map of Jacobs Music Center
- Former names: Fox Theatre (1929-85); Copley Symphony Hall(1985-2013); Copley Symphony Hall at Jacobs Music Center(2013-2024)
- Address: 1245 7th Ave; San Diego, California 92101-4302; San Diego
- Location: Downtown San Diego
- Owner: San Diego Symphony
- Operator: San Diego Symphony
- Capacity: 1,831
- Type: Concert Hall

Construction
- Opened: November 8, 1929
- Renovated: 2021- September, 2024
- Cost: $1.5 million ($28.1 million in 2025 dollars) Renovations: $125 million ($125 million in 2025 dollars)
- Architects: Builder: Weeks and Day; 2024: Renovator: HGA; Acoustician: Paul Scarbrough; Theater Planner: Schuler Shook

Tenant
- San Diego (Orchestra) 1984 - Present San Diego Symphony Festival Chorus (Chorus) 1984 - Present

Website
- Venue Website

The Jacobs Music Center located in San Diego, California, is a performance art center in the city of San Diego. Originally known as the Fox Theatre when it was built in 1929, This venue was built and designed with the focus on the architectural style of Gothic Revival. In the year 1984, the structure was handed over to the San Diego Symphony, which marked the end of its history as an office building. The Jacobs Music Center hosts musical events, community programs, music education, youth orchestras (including the San Diego Youth Symphony) and housed the conservatory that assists in the advancement of youth musicians. Beyond the symphony, it hosts other events, including Broadway shows, jazz and silent film screenings.

== History ==
The Symphony Towers in downtown San Diego which is currently the second tallest building in San Diego county (Behind One America Plaza) was built around the center in 1989. The center features an 4 manual Robert Morton pipe organ that is built into five walled chambers and was recently restored. The theatre had a seating capacity of 2,248 when it opened in 1929. The center was designed by Weeks and Day.

On February 23, 2022, the San Diego Symphony announced that Copley Symphony Hall at Jacobs Music Center would be renovated for acoustic improvements and a major stage remodel including a choral terrace. A year later in early 2023, it was announced that the San Diego Symphony would be returning to the center in a November 4 grand reopening concert.

The date was pushed back and it eventually was held on 28 September 2024. The $125 million renovation undertaken over a period of three years ensured that the venue, despite being renovated, retained its architectural history. As part of the renovations and transformation the main hall within the Jacob Music Center was renamed the Miller Family Theatre at Jacobs Music Center.

== Renovations ==
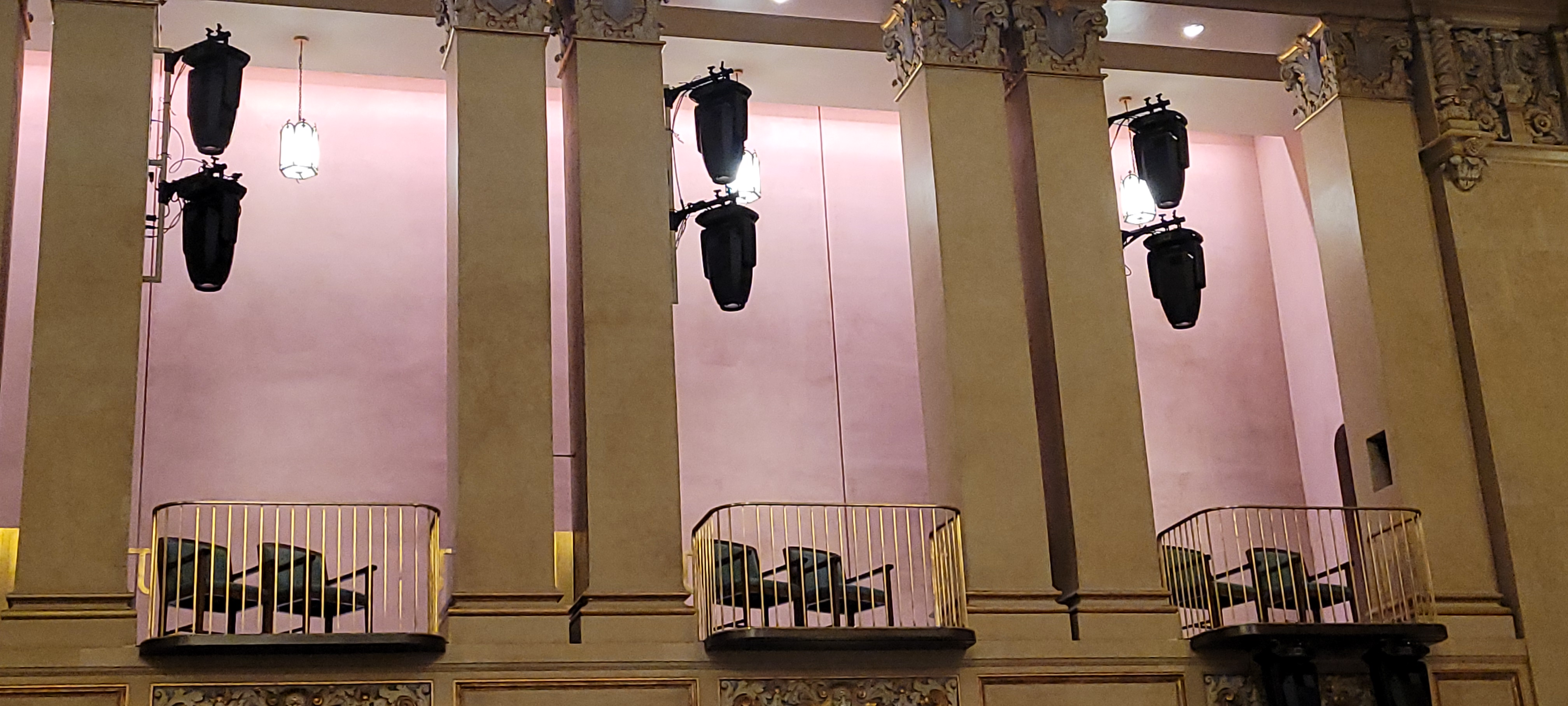
New side viewing seats

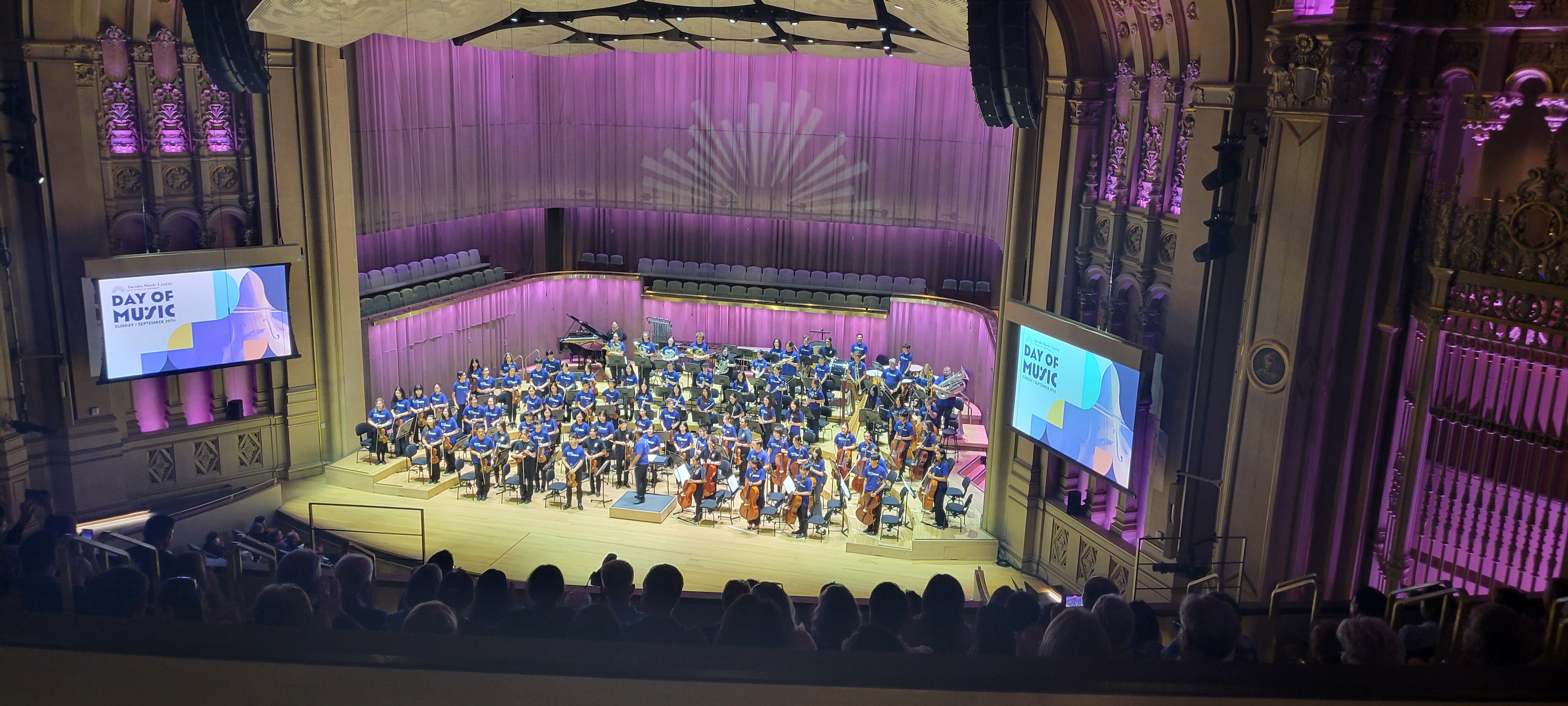
Day of Music, San Diego Youth Symphony

On February 23, 2022, the San Diego Symphony announced that Copley Symphony Hall at Jacobs Music Center would be renovated. The Jacob Music Center was renovated in a three year, $125 million project that was finished around September 2024. The renovation was led by architectural firm HGA, in partnership with Akustiks acoustic consultant, as well as theater planners Schuler Shook. In an effort to retain the venue's historic integrity and feel. This renovation effected changes to the stage and audience seating areas, including the introduction of a choral terrace located behind the orchestra, which in addition to supporting performances of large scale symphonic repertoire with chorus like Mahler's Symphonies No. 2 and 3, acts as a seating area when not being occupied by a choir, allowing people to view the orchestra from the back and adding seating.

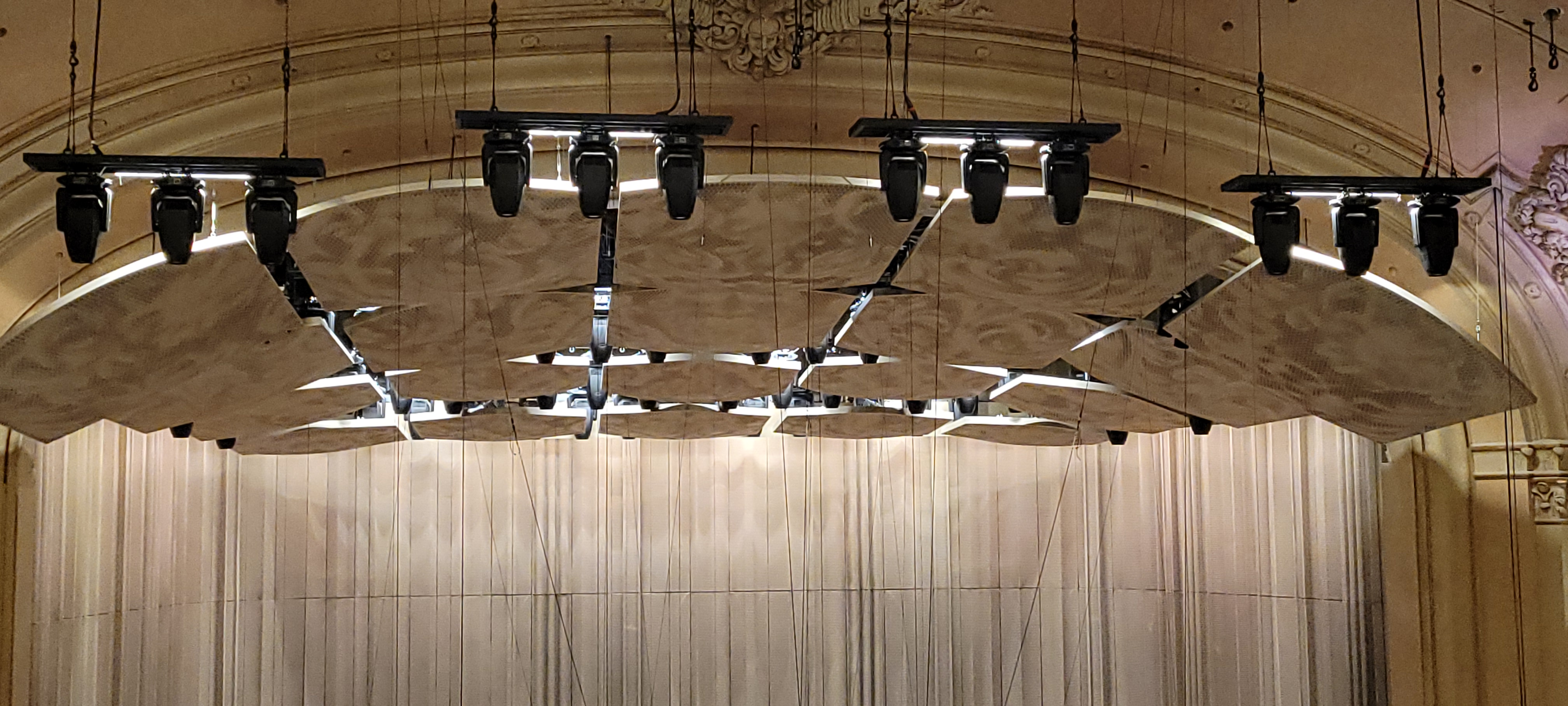
Acoustic canopy

During the renovation a variety of enhanced audience seating, as well as altered main floor seating areas, was added across the hall. Chairs were also added to the sides of the stage and the top to allow for more seating and view. In an effort to better satisfy acoustic requirements, the renovation included a permanent orchestra enclosure, risers, a tunable acoustic canopy, and other variable acoustics elements that enable the hall to accommodate a variety of musical programs and ensemble configurations, as well as improve sound clarity and balance for both the musicians and the audience. The acoustic canopy can be moved to better suite the type of ensemble. The acoustic canopy consists of 20 custom-designed, acoustically reflective composite FRP panels. The 15 panels can be precisely and independently adjusted in three dimensions – height, tilt (upstage/downstage) and roll (stage left/stage right). The five downstage panels can be raised and lowered at their fixed orientation. Together with the canopy, another acoustical element is crucial for expanding the hall’s programming versatility.

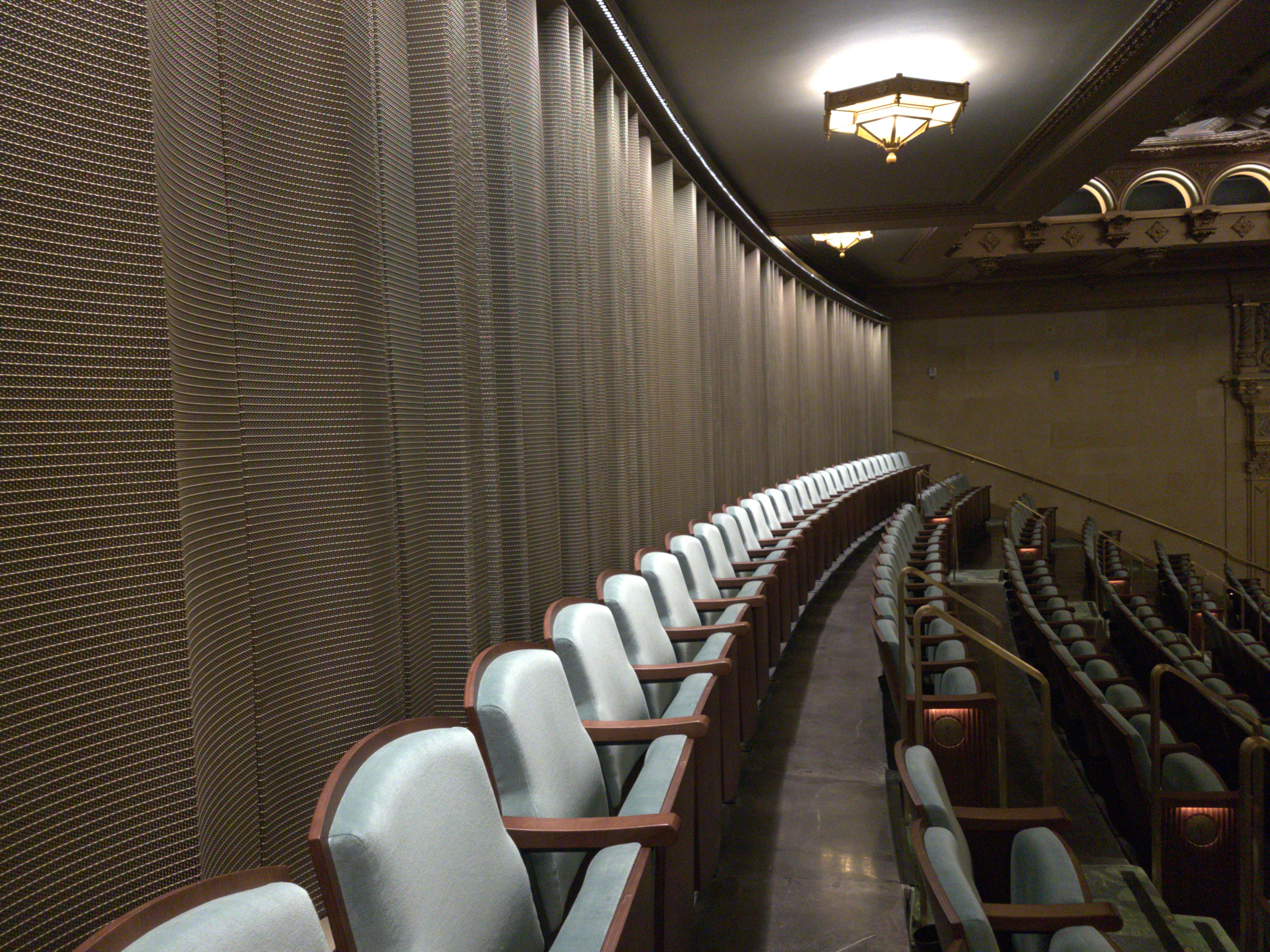
Acoustic wall paneling.

Variable acoustic curtains rigged in multiple locations – behind the stage and along the hall’s sides and rear. Made from heavy velour with 100% fullness, these motorized curtains are predominantly concealed behind decorative, acoustically transparent woven wire screens designed to highlight finer details of the hall’s interior while balancing its heavier architectural components. State-of-the-art sound, lighting, and video systems have been provided. This includes the installation of a state-of-the-art audio system designed by L-Acoustics, featuring multi-zone speakers controlled by a processor. Although hidden, the renovation introduced new and improved musicians' lounges and dressing rooms, artist suites, a music library, and climate-controlled instrument storage. In the course of the reconstruction, the HVAC life safety system upgrade increases the amount of air and filtration and fresh air within the hall, and decreases the amount of ambient noise from mechanical systems within the performance space. Beneath the stage is an innovative piano elevator, enabling grand pianos to be transported with care to a specially designed room.

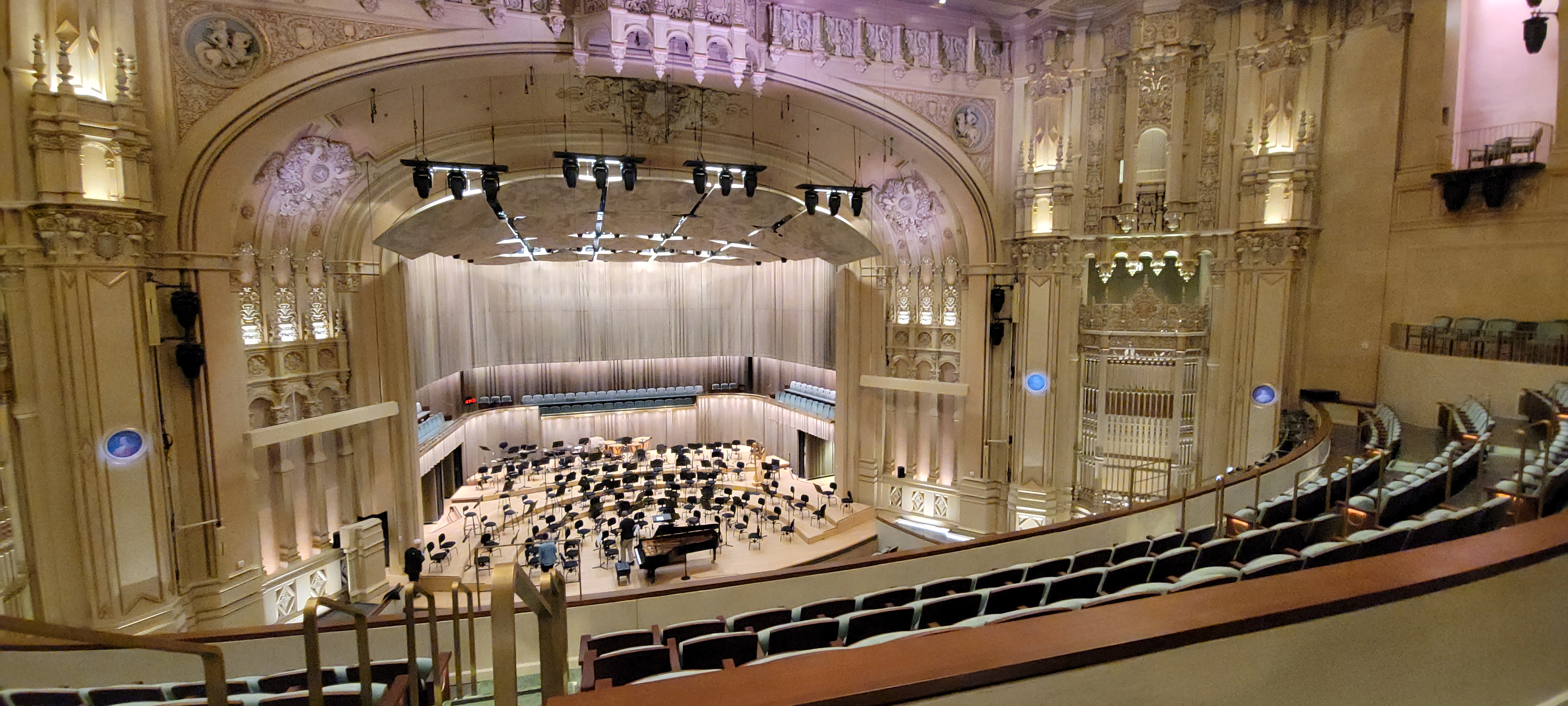
Wide view of the stage

The secret room is closely managed in terms of temperature and humidity, creating an optimal environment to preserve the delicate wood and parts of these pianos. The innovative design of the room ensures smooth and rapid transportation of pianos by artists and staff, including preservation of the life of these pianos as well as the exceptional sound quality demanded within the concert hall. In this process, original design components of plaster and chandeliers were restored. In total, the project encompassed the reimagining of 70,545 square feet of space, including performance space and back of house support spaces, as well as audience and front of house amenities. The reconfigured 22,787-square-foot audience chamber includes 862 seats on the main level with 894 seats in the balcony. The redesign created 75 additional seats available through a new opportunity above the stage in the choral terrace, for a total of 1,831 seats.

== The Robert Morton pipe organ ==
The 4 manual Robert Morton pipe organ was originally installed in the Balboa Theatre in 1923. It was built in Van Nuys, California by the Robert Morton Organ Company. Robert Morton was the second largest builder of theatre organs, building about half as many instruments as the industry leader Wurlitzer. The organ originally had 32 ranks of pipes, with approximately 61 pipes per rank. Being an early theatre organ, its design was more of an "orchestral" organ, designed for the playing of organ transcriptions of orchestral works, than the jazz based sound the later fully developed theatre organs had. It was moved to the then new Fox Theatre in 1929, as the same company owned both theatres and the Balboa was playing sound films by that time, lessening the need for an organ. The Robert Morton was the largest theatre organ in San Diego when it was installed, and has retained that title to the present. The new Fox Theatre, in addition to being the largest movie palace on the west coast at the time, was also a fully equipped Vaudeville theatre and the organ was originally intended to accompany a musical stage show running at the newly opened Fox, in addition to playing preludes and intermissions for film screenings. The organ was prominently featured in the 1929 opening gala, played by organist Charles Sulzer Sharpe Minor, or by his stage name "C Sharpe Minor". The use of the organ lessened over the decades, and by the 1960s it had become barely playable. A group of San Diego Theatre organ enthusiasts renovated the organ in the mid-1960s and instituted a long running theatre organ concert series, which during the 1960s and early 1970s. In the 1990s building renovation the organ console was disconnected for the installation of the new stage flooring, which led to a period of about 10 years where the organ was unplayable. In the early 2000s music director Jahja Ling, who started his career as an organist, spearheaded returning the organ to use with a refurbishment and enlargement. This work was supported by the Peter Lloyd Crotty Foundation. At the conclusion of the early 2000s renovation, the organ had 48 ranks. In 2018, organist Cameron Carpenter played a concert on the Robert Morton, the first solo organ concert at the hall since Virgil Fox played in 1973. The organ was also featured in the silent film series, and used with the orchestra for compositions with an organ part such as the Strauss "Also Sprach Zarathustra" and the Saint-Saens "Organ" Symphony. During the 2023 building renovations, the organ was removed from the hall for a comprehensive cleaning. The organ chambers were renovated and improved for tonal egress as part of the general acoustic improvements to the hall. A 21 rank Positive division was added to the organ in a space directly behind the decorative arches on either side of the proscenium that was formerly inaccessible unused space in the original building design. The Positive division can be played as a stand alone, 2 manual classical style organ, or together with the resources of the Robert Morton organ.

== Directors ==
- Marc Wolff (1992-1995)
- Evan T. Papel (1999-2001)

== See also ==
- List of concert halls
