= Jung-Ho Pak =

American symphony conductor (born 1962)

- Born: Burlingame, California
- Origin: United States
- Genres: Classical
- Occupations: Conductor; Musician

Jung-Ho Pak (born February 4, 1962, in Burlingame, California) is an American symphony conductor. He was Artistic Director of the San Diego Symphony and of the New Haven Symphony Orchestra, of which he is now Conductor Emeritus. He was Music Director of the Diablo Ballet and the NEXT Generation Chamber Orchestra. He was the artistic director of the now-defunct Orchestra Nova San Diego. Pak has guest conducted internationally. He was the Director of the Cape Symphony, and is a former musical director of the World Youth Symphony Orchestra and the director of orchestras at the Interlochen Center for the Arts. In May 2023, he announced that he was stepping down as the Artistic Director and Conductor of the Cape Symphony at the end of the summer.

== Education ==
Pak began studying the piano at age 6. Three years later, he was awarded a scholarship to the San Francisco Conservatory and enrolled in a college music theory class. He began studying clarinet at age 11, and played in multiple bands and orchestras into college.

- Graduated Lynbrook High School, San Jose, (1980)
- B. A., Music, University of California, Santa Cruz, (1980-2)
- Assoc. of California Symphony Orch. Conducting Seminar, Franz Allers (1982)
- San Francisco Conservatory of Music, Michael Senturia, Jahja Ling (1982-4)
- Tanglewood Conducting Seminar, (1983)
- M.M. University of Southern California, Daniel Lewis (1984-6)
- Herbert Blomstedt Conducting Institute, Master Class (1985)
- Redlands Symphony Conducting Institute (1986-7)
- American Conductors Guild Seminar, Harold Farberman, Dan Lewis (1987)
- Music Academy of the West, (1989)

== Career ==
Early in his career, Pak was a conductor and professor at several schools including the University of California, Berkeley and University of California, Santa Barbara, Idyllwild Arts Academy, and Lehigh University. In 1988, he won a national conducting competition with the Young Musicians Foundation's Debut Orchestra.

In 1997, Pak was appointed music director the San Diego Symphony to lead it out of bankruptcy, which eventually became an artistic and financial success, receiving one of the largest endowment pledges in American orchestral history (over $110 million). In 1998, Pak succeeded Daniel Lewis as music director of the University of Southern California Symphony and was also named music director at the San Francisco Conservatory of Music Orchestra. In 1999, he additionally became music director of the New Haven Symphony Orchestra, with which he was named Music Director Emeritus in 2007.

Since 2003, Pak has been director of orchestras and music director of the World Youth Symphony Orchestra at the Interlochen Center for the Arts, one of the largest and oldest arts camps in the country. In 2006, the San Diego Chamber Orchestra appointed Pak as artistic director and conductor; in 2009 the ensemble changed their name to Orchestra Nova San Diego to reflect their aspirations under Pak's leadership. The ensemble filed for Chapter 7 bankruptcy in 2012 due to an impasse between Pak and the Musician's Union, with Pak stating that he would prefer to choose members in his ensembles. In 2007, Pak began his tenure as artistic director and conductor of the Cape Cod Symphony Orchestra, one of the largest orchestras in Massachusetts. In 2008, Pak was a guest conductor for the 2008 ASTA National High School Honors Orchestra. In 2015, Pak was the conductor for the 2015 NAfME All-National Honors Symphony Orchestra. In May 2023, he announced that he was stepping down as the Artistic Director and Conductor of the Cape Symphony at the end of the summer.
