= San Diego Symphony =

American symphony orchestra

- Orchestra
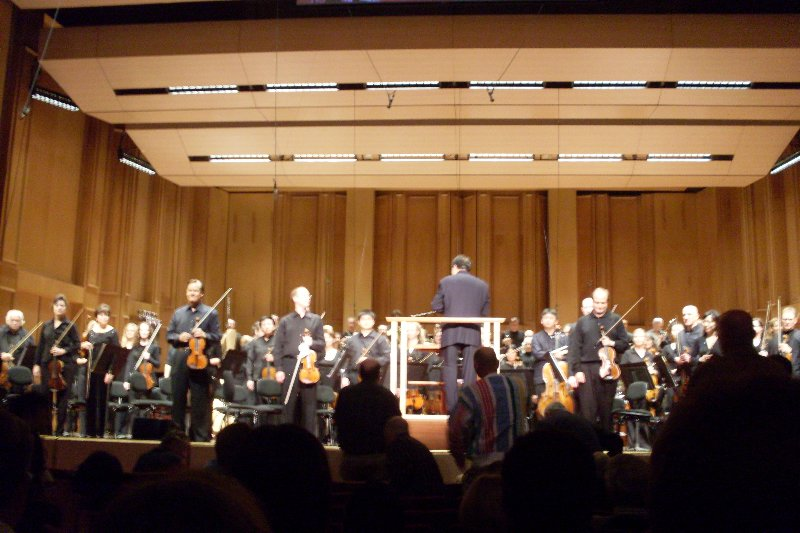
- San Diego Symphony after a performance of Sergei Prokofiev's Symphony No. 5
- Founded: 1910; 116 years ago
- Location: San Diego, California, U.S.
- Concert hall: Jacobs Music Center; The Rady Shell at Jacobs Park (summer)
- Music director: Rafael Payare
- Website: Official website

The San Diego Symphony is an American symphony orchestra based in San Diego, California. The orchestra performs at Jacobs Music Center and the Rady Shell at Jacobs Park. It serves as the orchestra for the San Diego Opera.

== History ==
On December 6, 1910, the orchestra gave its first concert as the San Diego Civic Orchestra. The orchestra encountered several periods of fiscal trouble over its history which forced it to cease operations. The first such period was from 1921 to 1926. The orchestra resumed limited summer concerts in 1927, but disbanded again in 1936. In 1949, the symphony began to play concerts again.

Jacobs Music Center was built in 1929 as a French Rococo style luxury movie theater, originally known as the Fox Theatre. The venue was conferred to the symphony in 1984. From 1996 to 1998, the fiscal troubles of the orchestra led it to file for bankruptcy in May 1996 and to cease operations.

With a bankruptcy plan centered on a $2 million gift from Larry Robinson and through the pro bono efforts of prominent bankruptcy attorneys Ted Graham and Jeff Garfinkle of Brobeck, Phleger & Harrison, and receiver, Thomas F. Lennon, who managed the finances, the orchestra reorganized and restarted in 1998, with Jung-Ho Pak serving as artistic director. He had become the symphony's assistant conductor in 1994.

Several years after the orchestra's reorganization, on January 14, 2002, the San Diego Symphony announced the single largest donation ever made to a symphony orchestra – US$120 million by Joan and Irwin Jacobs. One report stated that the arrangement is for $50 million to be donated over a period of 10 years, at $5 million a year. The remainder would then be left to the orchestra as a bequest.

In 2001, the orchestra had ratified an agreement which would increase the musicians' annual base salary from $25,920 to $45,750, with an expansion of the concert season from 26 weeks to 41 weeks. In 2006, the orchestra ratified a new 5-year contract that raised the annual minimum salary from $45,750 to $57,776 over five years. The 41-week season will also expand to 42 weeks. As of 2006, the annual budget of the orchestra was $14 million. In September 2016, the San Diego Symphony announced a new 5-year contract which will increase base musician salaries from just under $70,000 to $80,000 per year.

In January 2016, the San Diego Symphony won approval to construct a new outdoor pavilion to host its Summer Pops programs.

Jahja Ling was music director from 2004 to 2017, and now has the title of conductor laureate of the orchestra. From 2006 until his death in 2012, the principal pops conductor of the orchestra was Marvin Hamlisch. The current chief executive officer of the orchestra is Martha Gilmer, since October 2014.

In January 2015, Edo de Waart first guest-conducted the orchestra. In January 2019, the orchestra announced the appointment of de Waart as its first-ever principal guest conductor, effective with the 2019–2020 season.

In January 2018, Rafael Payare first guest-conducted the orchestra. On the basis of this concert, in February 2018, the orchestra named Payare its next music director, effective July 1, 2019. His initial contract is for 4 years, and he assumed the title of music director-designate with immediate effect. In October 2020, the orchestra announced an extension of Payare's contract as music director through the 2025–2026 season.

Melvin G. Goldzband, the San Diego Symphony's archivist, has published a book about the orchestra, San Diego Symphony from Overture to Encore.

== Music directors ==
- B. Roscoe Schryock (1912–1920)
- Nino Marcelli (1936–1937)
- Nikolai Sokoloff (1938–1941)
- Fabien Sevitzky (1949–1952)
- Robert Shaw (1953–1958)
- Earl Bernard Murray (1959–1966)
- Zoltán Rozsnyai (1967–1971)
- Peter Erős (1972–1979)
- David Atherton (1980–1987)
- Yoav Talmi (1989–1996)
- Jung-Ho Pak (1998–2002, artistic director)
- Jahja Ling (2004–2017)
- Rafael Payare (2019–present)
