= Stephen Tong =

Chinese-Indonesian pastor

The Reverend Stephen Tong
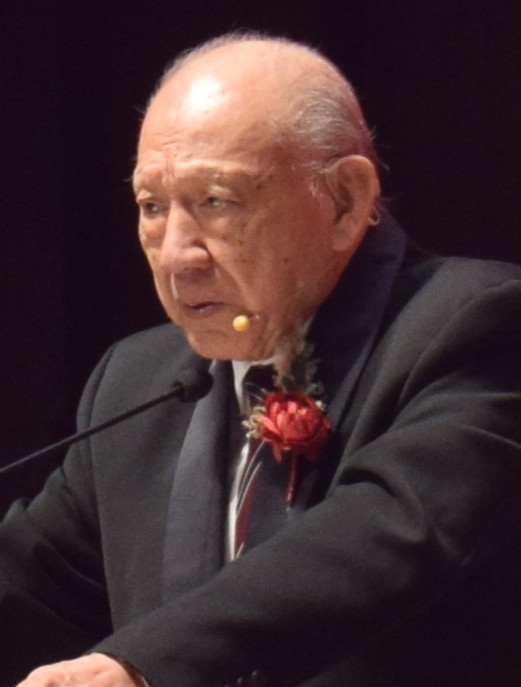
- Tong in 2025
- Born: March 22, 1940 (age 86); Gulangyu, Xiamen, Fujian, China
- Education: Bachelor of Theology, Southeast Asia Bible Seminary
- Occupations: Pastor, evangelist, teacher, conductor, composer, architect, writer
- Spouse: Sulfie Lalujawati (original name) or Alice Tong (married name)
- Children: Elizabeth Tong; David Tong; Eunice Tong; Rebecca Tong
- Parent(s): Tong Pai Hu (father); Tan Tjien Nio (mother)
- Religion: Christian
- Church: Reformed Evangelical Church of Indonesia
- Ordained: 1982
- Offices held: Head of Synod, Reformed Evangelical Church of Indonesia; President, Stephen Tong Evangelistic Ministries International (STEMI)
- Title: Doctor (Honorary)

Stephen Tong
- Traditional Chinese: 唐崇榮
Transcriptions
Standard Mandarin
- Hanyu Pinyin: Táng Chóngróng
Yue: Cantonese
- Jyutping: tong4 sung4 wing4

Stephen Tong (Chinese: 唐崇榮; pinyin: Táng Chóngróng; Jyutping: tong4 sung4 wing4, born on 22 March 1940) is a Chinese Indonesian Reformed pastor, evangelist, teacher, and musician. He heads the Reformed Evangelical Church of Indonesia, which houses the megachurch Messiah Cathedral, and is the largest Christian Church building in Southeast Asia. He has preached in countries around the world, and guest lectured at theological seminaries and schools.

== Early life ==
Tong was born in 1940 in Xiamen, China, from Tong Pai Hu, a businessman whose family was highly regarded by the Qing government, and Tan Tjien Nio (Indonesian: Dorcas Tanjowati). He is the sixth of nine children, only one of whom was a girl. (Note: The Tong family consisted of seven sons: Tony (Tong Tjong Po), Peter (Tong Tjong Ping), John (Tong Tjong Tjoe), Caleb (Tong Tjong Ming), Solomon (Tong Tjong An), Stephen (Tong Tjong Eng) and Joseph (Tong Tjong Hway). They also had one daughter, Mary Tong Tjong Hwa (the eldest sister died at young age). Five of the sons, including Stephen, became Christian ministers.) his father died when Stephen was 3; his family wealth had eroded during the years of Japanese imperialism. At that time, Tong's mother fostered their brothers and sister alone.

In 1949, he and his mother and siblings migrated to Surabaya, Indonesia, to find a better place of living during the Chinese Communist Revolution. He completed primary education at Min Guang Primary School and he graduated from Chung Hwa High School (中華高中學) in 1958. Though he had not graduated yet, he had been teaching as either assistant or formal teacher from 1957 till 1960 at Zhong Guo Nui Xue School and Yi Xing Night School.

When Tong was 15 years old, he had strong beliefs in communism, which he called "Karl Marx's dialectical materialism". He ascribed to Charles Darwin's theory of evolution, and had a deep hatred towards Christianity, which he regarded as "the foolish religion which came from the devilish West and has illogical teachings". However, he respected that his mother had a devoted spiritual life: "When I was small, the first words I'd hear in the morning were those of my mother while she prayed. She prayed for each of us children by name, and asked God to guide us.".

In 1957, his mother asked him to attend a Christian Youth Conference that was conducted by the Southeast Asia Bible Seminary (SEABS) (Indonesian: Madrasah Alkitab Asia Tenggara, now Indonesian: Seminari Alkitab Asia Tenggara, SAAT) in Malang in 1957. On 9 January, the last day of the conference, when Andrew Gih gave a revival sermon, Tong became a Christian. He began to share the Gospel, and taught children in Christian schools. In 1960, he enrolled in SEABS, and later graduated with a Bachelor of Theology in 1964. He then joined SEABS's faculty, and taught theology and philosophy classes from 1964 to 1988.

== Ministry ==
While he was a teacher at South East Asia Bible Seminary, Tong served as an evangelist at THKTKH (Min Nan: Tiong Hoa Kie Tok Kauw Hwee [中华基督教会]); (Indonesian: Gereja Kristus Tionghua, now GKT (Gereja Kristus Tuhan)), transliterated "Church of Christ The Lord", and travelled weekly between Malang and Surabaya. (Note: The distance between Malang and Surabaya is 200 km (120 mi). Tong made weekly trips from 1964 to 1979.)

Around that time, he had tried leading some Gospel Rallies in various cities in Indonesia. Subsequently, starting in 1969, he received invitations to lead Gospel Rallies across Europe, America, Australia, Japan, Hong Kong, Taiwan, Thailand, Vietnam, Philippines, Malaysia, Singapore, and many more. It is intended mostly for Chinese and Indonesian speakers. In 1974, he began conducting seminars in Surabaya to provide truthful doctrinal understanding for churches in Indonesia.

In 1978, along with Jahja Ling, he established Stephen Tong Evangelistic Ministries International (STEMI). One of its goals is to equip people for full-time ministry. He preaches at cities across Southeast Asia.

In 1982, he received his ordination as pastor. He served at GKT (Indonesian: Gereja Kristus Tuhan, "Church of Christ The Lord"), then ministered in GKA (Indonesian: Gereja Kristen Abdiel, "Servant Christian Church"). He has conducted services in Mandarin and Indonesian, but some of his speaking engagements have been in Fujian and English.

Since then, he has guest lectured in Theology and delivered sermons in various prominent universities at the China Graduate School of Theology (Hong Kong), China Evangelical Seminary (Taiwan), Trinity Theological College (Singapore), Regent College (Canada), and universities in the United States, including: Westminster Theological Seminary, Harvard, MIT, Stanford, Yale, University of California Berkeley, University of Maryland, Columbia University, Cornell University, etc.

Since the GRII has found in 1989, his services have extended to many major cities in Indonesia, including Surabaya, Medan, Malang, Bandung, especially during the Christmas and Easter seasons. To maintain contact with the cities outside Jakarta, he established STEMI branch offices in each of the areas. He added offices in the United States and the European Union.

From 2000 until 2019, he travels weekly to around 5 countries (Indonesia, Singapore, Malaysia, Hong Kong, Taiwan) to serve for approximately 6000 audiences. In 2009, Ric Cannada, Chancellor of Reformed Theological Seminary, noted in his school's newsletter that Tong's weekly preaching schedule included "two Sunday services in Jakarta; every Sunday evening at two services in a church in Singapore; every Monday evening at a church in Kuala Lumpur, Malaysia; every Tuesday night at a church in Hong Kong; and every Wednesday night at a church in Taipei, Taiwan."

=== Reformed Evangelical Movement ===
Tong observed that many churches have been influenced by worldly philosophy, and ones that were loyal to the genuine teaching of the Bible were rare. In 1984, he started the Reformed Evangelical Movement with the purpose of restoring the understanding of theology based on God's revelation in Scripture and igniting people with zeal for evangelism. The movement is "aimed at meeting the challenge of the Charismatic movement as well as liberalism." He conducted theological seminars such as the Christian Faith Development Seminar (Indonesian: Seminar Pembinaan Iman Kristen, SPIK), to introduce Reformed theology to the people in Jakarta. His first seminar, "Faith and Religion", was attended by about 1,200 people. He would later adapt the seminars into books and multimedia, which he publishes in-house. The SPIK seminars have become the source material for the Indonesian Reformed Evangelical Institution (Indonesian: Lembaga Reformed Injili Indonesia, LRII), a seminary which Tong co-founded with pastors Caleb Tong and Yakub Susabda in 1986.

In 1986, Tong started the Evangelical Reformed Theological School Surabaya (Indonesian: Sekolah Teologi Reformed Injili, STRI) for laymen in Surabaya. In 1987, he started a similar theological school in Jakarta, and in 1990, he started one in Malang. The goal is to encourage Christian congregations from all denominations to study Reformed theology.

=== Reformed Evangelical Church of Indonesia ===
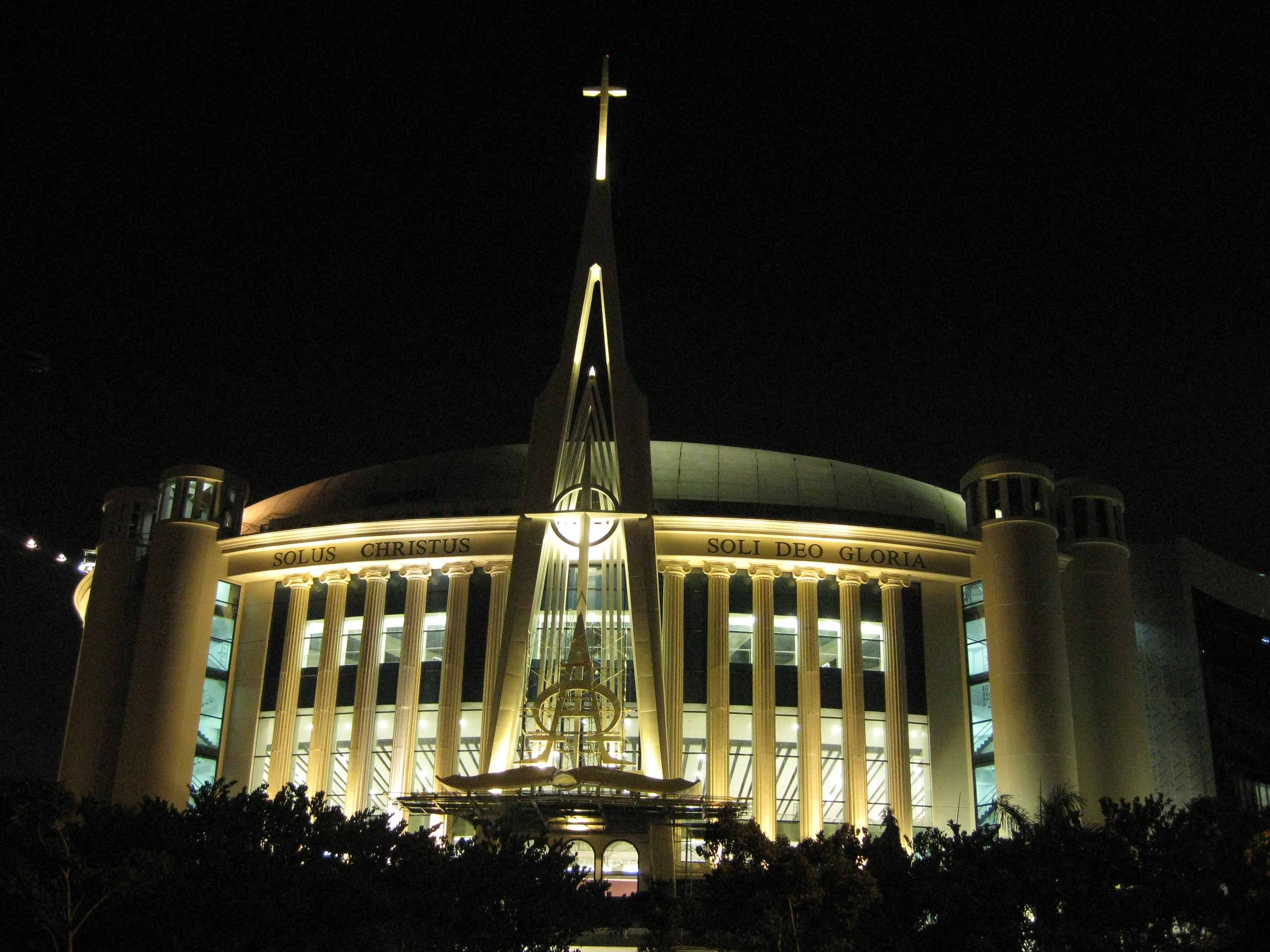
Messiah Cathedral, captured from Kemayoran Street.

Stephen Tong founded the Reformed Evangelical Church of Indonesia in 1989 to establish a church based on Reformed theology and congregations that are committed to evangelism. He is currently the Head of The Consistory Board, and has handed over the Head of Synod position to his peer, Rev. Antonius Un. Although the church subscribes to the Reformed confessions, it also has its own specific confessions of faith. In 2004, GRII had congregations in five Indonesian cities and has expanded to branch churches around the world in Asia, Australia, Germany, and North America.

Tong personally designed the Messiah Cathedral (Indonesian: Katedral Mesias), whose proposal took 15 years to approve. Opening ceremonies took place on 18–20 September 2008, including a classical music concert and a dedication service. The building has 600,000 square feet (56,000 m^{2}) of space, and two auditoriums that seat up to 8,000 people. The building is also home to the Reformed Millennium Center of Indonesia (RMCI), which holds some of Tong's other projects and organizations.

=== Other institutions ===
Tong's (Indonesian: Lembaga Reformed Injili Indonesia, LRII) seminary has since been named Reformed Seminary Indonesia (Indonesian: Sekolah Tinggi Teologi Reformed Indonesia, STTRI). Yakub Susabda serves as its president and a teacher. The seminary offers an undergraduate degree in Theology, and master's degrees in Christian ministry, divinity, theology, and counseling.

In 1996, he founded the Reformed Institute for Christianity and the 21st Century in Washington DC. Its purpose was "to equip Christians for global evangelization in the 21st Century by training them in the areas of reformed theology, apologetics, evangelism, and the critical study of Eastern and Western cultures". The institute was renamed to the Reformed Institute of North America (RINA) in 2007, with locations throughout the United States and Canada. However, RINA appears to have ceased operations around the end of 2017. The original website is no longer accessible, a link to an updated version lacks any updates after 2017, and information about its current status is unknown.

In 1996, he also established the Reformed Institute Jakarta (Indonesian: Institut Reformed Jakarta). The school is headed by GRII pastor Benyamin Intan, and offers undergraduate degrees in Theology and Ecclesiastical Music, and master's degrees in Divinity, Evangelism, and Christian studies. Its Reformed Ecclesiastical Faculty of Music was established in 2002; its goal is "to return all the glory to God through music at its best." In 2008, the institute, now named International Reformed Evangelical Seminary (Indonesian: Sekolah Tinggi Teologi Reformed Injili Internasional, STTRII) moved to the Reformed Millennial Center (RMCI) in Jakarta. It has signed MoU with Westminster Theological Seminary (2011), Theologische Universiteit Kampen (2014), and Theologische Universiteit Apeldoorn (2017).

In 2000, Tong attended the inaugural meeting of the World Reformed Fellowship, whose purpose is to formalize the Reformed Confession of Faith in the 21st Century. In 2006, they created the statement of faith and appointed members for their Commission of Theology. Tong joined Reformed theologians Gerald Bray, A. T. B. McGowan, Peter Jones, and Samuel Logan as members. (Note: GRII pastor Benyamin Intan also serves on the Board of Directors for the World Reformed Fellowship.)

In 2006, Tong and Intan co-founded the think tank group, Reformed Center for Religion and Society (Indonesian: Pusat Pengkajian Reformed bagi Agama dan Masyarakat, RCRS); its purpose is to promote the cultural mandate.

In 2008, Tong founded Sekolah Kristen Calvin (Calvin Christian School). Tong also founded Calvin Institute of Technology in 2018.

== Music and arts ==
Tong has composed music in Indonesian, Mandarin, and English. He occasionally conducts choirs and orchestras, and gives church talks about the appreciation of sacred music. He founded the Jakarta Oratorio Society in 1986, a choir that specializes in worship music.

During the development of the Messiah Cathedral, he contributed to the design of the Reformed Millennium Center of Indonesia (RMCI) and helped design some of other church buildings in Indonesia. In 2009, he opened the Aula Simfonia Jakarta concert hall in the RMCI; it holds 1,200 seats. He served as the music director for the Jakarta Simfonia Orchestra, along with artistic consultant Jahja Ling and Billy Kristanto. In 2011, he opened the Galeria Sophilia in the RMCI to display some of his and church members antiques for education.

== Personal life ==
Tong married Sulfie Lalujawati in 1971. They live in Jakarta, Indonesia. They have one son and three daughters. Their son, David Tong, is a pastor in GRII. He served in the United States and then pastored GRII Karawaci, Tangerang from 2019 to 2023. Currently, David serves as the Rector of Calvin Institute of Technology. Their daughter Eunice works as the music director for Aula Simfonia Jakarta. Their youngest daughter Rebecca is a conductor and music director for Aula Simfonia Jakarta.

In addition to enjoying classical music from the Baroque period, Tong enjoys collecting watches and antiques.

== Honors and awards ==
In 1985, Tong was awarded an honorary Doctor of Leadership in Christian Evangelism (DLCE) degree from the La Madrid International Academy of Leadership in Manila, Philippines

In 1992, pastor Philip Teng called him the "Billy Graham of the East" for his large-scale ministries in Southeast Asia.

In 2007, STEMI published the book God's Fiery Challenge for Our Time: Festschrift in Honor of Stephen Tong, the Founder and the Master Planner of Reformed Evangelical Movement: 50 Year Preaching the Word of God to regard him as "the True Evangelist of this Age" (ISBN 978-9791620314).

In May 2008, he received an honorary Doctor of Divinity (DD) degree from the Westminster Theological Seminary in Glenside, Pennsylvania.

In 2011, Westminster Theological Seminary created an endowment for the Stephen Tong Chair of Reformed Theology. The professorship was given to Jeffry K. Jue, an associate professor in church history.

In 2025, Calvin University and Calvin Theological Seminary awarded him The Kuyper Prize, an annual award named after Dutch theologian Abraham Kuyper, which is given to a scholar or community leader whose outstanding contribution to their chosen sphere reflects the ideas and values characteristic of the Neo-Calvinist vision of religious engagement in matters of social, political, and cultural significance in one or more of the ‘spheres’ of society.

== Bibliography ==
Tong has written books based on his sermons and teachings. Most of the books are published in-house by Momentum Publisher and are mostly available in Indonesian language. They are grouped by topic below.

SPIK

Tong's books from the Christian Faith Development Seminar (Indonesian: Seminar Pembinaan Iman Kristen, SPIK); the number denotes SPIK conducted in Jakarta:

#	Title	First conducted	Book published	ISBN
1	Iman dan Agama (Faith and Religion)	1984	1989	ISBN 979-8307-27-5
2	Iman dan Wahyu (Faith and Revelation)	1984	N/A	–
3	Wahyu dan Pewahyu (Revelation and Revelator)	1985	N/A	–
4	Wahyu dan Alkitab (Revelation and The Bible)	1986	N/A	–
5	Allah Tritunggal (The Triune God)	1987	1990	ISBN 979-8307-07-0
6	Iman, Rasio, dan Kebenaran (Faith, Reason, and Truth)	1988	1995	ISBN 979-8307-38-0
7	Iman Kristen dan Liberalisme (Christian Faith and Liberalism)	1989	N/A	–
8	Peta dan Teladan Allah (Image and Likeness of God)	1990	1990	ISBN 979-8307-26-7
9	Siapakah Kristus? (Who is Christ?)	1991	1991	ISBN 979-8307-06-2
10	Dosa, Keadilan, dan Penghakiman (Sin, Justice, and Judgment)	1992	1993	ISBN 979-8307-06-2
11	Roh Kudus, Doa, dan Kebangunan (The Holy Spirit, Prayer, and Revival)	1993	1995	ISBN 978-979-8307-37-9
12	Dinamika Hidup dalam Pimpinan Roh Kudus (Dynamics of Life within the Guidance of the Holy Spirit)	1994	1995	ISBN 979-8307-38-0
13	Baptisan dan Karunia Roh Kudus (The Baptism and the Gift of the Holy Spirit)	1995	1996	ISBN 979-8307-41-0
14	Roh Kudus, Hati Nurani, dan Setan (The Holy Spirit, Conscience, and the Devil)	1996	1997	ISBN 979-8307-44-5
15	Ujian, Pencobaan, dan Kemenangan (Trials, Temptations, and Triumphs)	1997	1998	ISBN 979-8307-49-6
16	Iman, Penderitaan, Hak Asasi Manusia (Faith, Suffering, and Human Rights)	1998	1999	ISBN 979-8307-61-5
17	Kedaulatan Allah dan Kuasa Pemerintahan (Sovereignty of God and Government's Power)	1999	N/A	–
18	Kerajaan Allah, Gereja, dan Pelayanan (The Kingdom of God, the Church, and Ministry)	2000	2000	ISBN 979-3292-00-8

Seri Mimbar

Tong's books for the Reformed Evangelical Pulpit Series (Indonesian: Seri Mimbar Reformed Injili Indonesia) include:

Title	Book published	ISBN
Waktu Dan Hikmat (Time and Wisdom)	1990	ISBN 979-8307-32-1
Keluarga Bahagia (Happy Family)	1991	See talk page
Membesarkan Anak Dalam Tuhan (Fostering Children in God)	1991	ISBN 979-8307-24-0
Hidup Kristen yang Berbuah (Fruitful Christian Life)	1992	ISBN 979-8307-01-1
Iman, Pengharapan, dan Kasih dalam Krisis (Faith, Hope, and Love in Crisis)	1998	ISBN 979-8307-52-6
Mengetahui Kehendak Allah (Knowing God's Will)	1999	ISBN 979-8307-57-7

Special Courses

Additional teaching topics authored by Tong:

Title	Book published	ISBN
Teologi Penginjilan (The Theology of Evangelism)	1988	ISBN 979-8307-63-1
Arsitek Jiwa (Architect of the Soul)	1991	ISBN 979-8307-08-9
Reformasi dan Teologi Reformed (Reformation and Reformed Theology)	1992	ISBN 979-8307-23-2
7 Perkataan Salib (The Seven Sayings on the Cross)	1992	ISBN 979-8307-03-8
Arsitek Jiwa II (Architect of the Soul II)	1993	ISBN 979-3292-02-4
Pemuda dan Krisis Zaman (Youth and the Age's Crisis)	1996	ISBN 979-8307-43-7
Dosa dan Kebudayaan (Sin and Culture)	1997	ISBN 979-8307-45-3
Pengudusan Emosi (The Sanctification of Emotion)	2007	ISBN 979-3292-58-X

Gospel Rallies

Tong wrote these books for the STEMI rallies.

Title	First conducted	Book published	ISBN
Yesus Kristus Juruselamat Dunia (Jesus Christ, The Savior of the World)	2003	2004	ISBN 979-8131-83-5
Dari Iman kepada Iman (From Faith to Faith)	2004	2004	ISBN 979-8131-90-8

Devotionals, adopted from Momentum Fellowship in booklet size (no ISBN)

Title	Fellowship #	Book published
Pelayan Yang Beriman (The Faithful Servant)	60	1993
Cara Pandang Seorang Pelayan (A Servant's Worldview)	57	1993
Pelayan Yang Melarikan Diri (The Running Away Servant)	51	1993
Pelayan Yang Berdukacita (The Grieving Servant)	53	1995
Pelayan Yang Mengasihani Diri Sendiri (The Servant Who Pitied Himself)	54	1996
Jerih Payah Seorang Pelayan (A Servant's Toil)	8	1996
Harta Seorang Pelayan (A Servant's Treasure)	25	1996
Pelayan Yang Berkorban (The Servant Who Sacrifices)	52	1996
Kebahagiaan Yudas (Judas's Joy)	70	1997
Pelayan Yang Memberitakan Injil (The Servant Who Proclaims The Gospel)	100	1997
Pembentukan Seorang Hamba (The Shaping of a Servant)	58	1998
Pergumulan Seorang Pelayan (A Servant's Struggle)	48	1998

Others

Title	Book published	ISBN
Seni Membentuk Karakter Kristen (The Art of Molding Christian's Character) – book transcribed from a seminar with another speaker	1995	ISBN 978-979-8307-40-9
Gerakan Reformed Injili: Apa dan Mengapa? (Reformed Evangelical Movement: What and Why?)	2005	ISBN 979-8131-93-2

== Discography ==
Tong has written songs for his worship services and STEMI gospel rallies. The songs are listed with the year and location when they were first performed: (Note: Kidung Persekutuan Reformed Injili (songbook) (Jakarta: Sinode GRII, 2001), source can be downloaded at http://www.bibleforandroid.com/KPRI)

Song title	Year	First performed
Bila Kaupernah Cinta Yesus (If You Once Loved Jesus)	1961	Semarang, Indonesia
Sebagai Keledai (As a Donkey)	1965	Malang, Indonesia
Api Zaman (Fire of the Ages) (Note: The song Api Zaman was co-written with C. Yu.)	1969	Malang, Indonesia
Tuhan Ampuni Dosaku (Forgive My Sin, Lord)	1975	Surabaya, Indonesia
Kidung Agung (My Hymn)	1975	Manila, Philippines
Aku Sedang Berjalan (I am Walking)	1977	Serawak, Malaysia
Kemana Saja (Wherever I Go)	1977	Serawak, Malaysia
Utus Aku Dalam Misimu (Send Me into Your Mission)	1981	Singapore
Hanya Bagimu (Only For Thee)	1982	Taipei, Taiwan
Korban Hidup (Living Offering)	1985	Malang, Indonesia
Bangkit Bagi Kristus (Stand up for Christ)	1986	Jakarta, Indonesia
Belum Pernah Ku Rendah Hati (Never Have I Been Humble)	1995	Forthhope, Canada
Sukacita Tuhan Penuhiku (Lord's Joy Fulfills Me)	1998	Hong Kong
Siapakah Juruselamat Dunia (Who is the Savior of the World?)	2003	Jakarta, Indonesia
Kupegang Tangan-Mu (I hold Your Hand)	2013	Jakarta, Indonesia
B'ritakan Injil Selamanya (Proclaim the Gospel Forever)	2013 (Note: at Konvensi Injil National 2013 (KIN) event.)	Jakarta, Indonesia
Ikut Tuhanku (Follow My Lord)	2014 (Note: at Konvensi Injil National 2014 (KIN) event.)	Jakarta, Indonesia
Kucinta Firman Tuhan (I Love the Word of God)	2020 (Note: at Bible Camp Nasional 2020 (BCN) event.)	Jakarta, Indonesia
Benar! Berani! Setia! (True! Brave! Faithful!)	2020 (Note: at National Reformed Evangelical Teen Convention 2020 (NRETC) event.)	Jakarta, Indonesia
Aku Cinta Gereja Tuhan (I Love the Church of God)	2021 (Note: at Bible Camp Nasional 2021 (BCN) event.)	Jakarta, Indonesia
Tuhan Panggil, 'Ku Dengar (The Lord Calls, I Listen)	2021 (Note: at Bible Camp Nasional 2021 (BCN) event.)	Jakarta, Indonesia
Besar Anugerah-Nya (Great is His Grace)	2021 (Note: at Bible Camp Nasional 2021 (BCN) event.)	Jakarta, Indonesia
Kita Bersekutu Dalam Tuhan (We are United in God)	2021 (Note: at National Reformed Evangelical Convention Youth & Workers 2021 (NREC) event.)	Jakarta, Indonesia
Mars Reformed Injili (Reformed Evangelical March)	2021	Jakarta, Indonesia
'Ku Suka Kabar Injil (I'd Like to Preach the Gospel)	2022 (Note: at Bible Camp Nasional 2022 (BCN) event.)	Jakarta, Indonesia
Aku Jadi Remaja	2022 (Note: at National Reformed Evangelical Teen Convention 2022 (NRETC) event.)	Jakarta, Indonesia
Ku Rindu Hidup Suci (I Long to Live Holy)	2023 (Note: at Bible Camp Nasional 2023 (BCN) event.)	Jakarta, Indonesia
Rajakanlah Kristus (Crown and Worship Jesus)	2024 (Note: at Bible Camp Nasional 2024 (BCN) event.)	Jakarta, Indonesia
Roh Kudus Pimpin Aku Datang pada Tuhan Yesus	2025 (Note: at National Reformed Evangelical Teen Convention 2025 (NRETC) event.)	Jakarta, Indonesia
Yang Lama Berlalu, Kini Tiba yang Baru	2025 (Note: at National Reformed Evangelical Teen Convention 2025 (NRETC) event.)	Jakarta, Indonesia
Mencintai Papa Mama	2026 (Note: at Bible Camp Nasional 2026 (BCN) event.)	Jakarta, Indonesia
