= Highland Theological College =

Academic institution in Highland, Scotland

Coordinates: 57°35′43″N 4°25′26″W

- Colaiste Diadhachd na Gàidhealtachd UHI
- Motto: A Community of Faith and Scholarship
- Type: College
- Established: 1994
- Affiliations: University of the Highlands and Islands,
- Religious affiliation: Reformed Evangelical
- Principal: Dr. Jamie Grant
- Faculty: 15
- Students: 141
- Location: Dingwall, Ross-shire, Scotland
- Website: www.htc.uhi.ac.uk

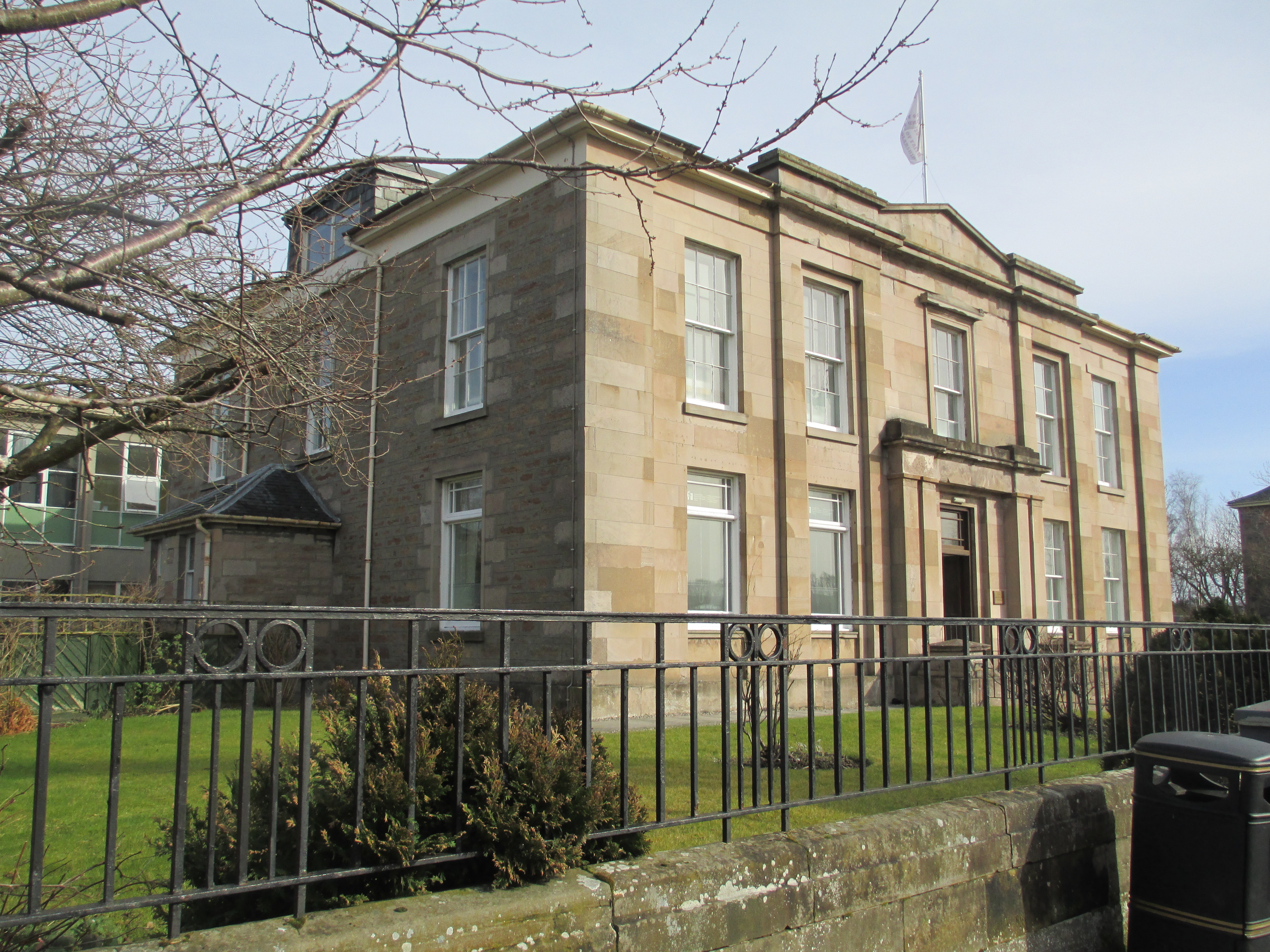
Highland Theological College, Dingwall

The Highland Theological College (HTC; Scottish Gaelic: Colaiste Diadhachd na Gàidhealtachd) is located in Dingwall, Scotland. It is part of the University of the Highlands and Islands. However, while being in a secular university, it has a distinctiveness of being explicitly Christian, with its aim to provide theological education from a Reformed and evangelical perspective, and having the Westminster Confession of Faith as its subordinate standard.

== History ==
The foundation of what became HTC began in 1992. In that year, the UHI project (UHIp) was begun. Rev. Andrew McGowan, then minister of Trinity Possil & Henry Drummond Church of Scotland worked on a plan to establish a theological college as part of this new venture. The plans were worked on along with Alexander Murray, the Associated Presbyterian Church minister in Lairg, as well as other Christian ministers and businessmen.

In 1994 the Highland Theological Institute was set up with the assistance of Moray College and based in a small building in its grounds. The initial staff team was made up of two Church of Scotland ministers Andrew McGowan and Hector Morrison (formerly minister at Kyle of Lochalsh).

In 1999 they moved to premises that had been acquired in the centre of Dingwall and the name was changed to Highland Theological College (HTC). The opening of the new campus was on 10 September 1999.

In 2006 it was approved by the General Assembly of the Church of Scotland as a college for the training of Church of Scotland ministers. Furthermore, it is a recognised provider of theological training for those entering ministry within the Associated Presbyterian Church of Scotland and the United Free Church of Scotland. Theologically, it is within the evangelical and Reformed Christian tradition.

In 2014 there were 141 students.

In 2015, the college opened a satellite site in Glasgow, utilising the offices of the United Free Church of Scotland. However, in 2017, they found a permanent base using the Wynd Centre in the town centre of Paisley.

== Campuses ==
HTC operates two campuses, the main one in Dingwall, which was built in the 1830s, was formerly the National Bank of Scotland, then the headquarters of the North of Scotland Hydro Electric Board. The other is within the Wynd Centre, part of Oakshaw Trinity Church in Paisley, which was opened in 2017.

HTC has a library numbering 65,000 volumes.

== Faculty ==
Dr. Jamie Grant has been the principal since December 2025 (and had served as Vice Principal previously). Rev. Hector Morrison was the principal from 2009. Before that, Rev. Andrew McGowan was the principal from its foundation, with Hector Morrison serving as Vice-Principal.

Rev Dr Innes Visagie, Senior Lecturer in Philosophy and Practical Theology, serves as Vice Principal.

There are five full time academic staff, with ten part time academic staff. Staff come from a variety of theological perspectives within the broader Reformed tradition.
