= East Church, Inverness =

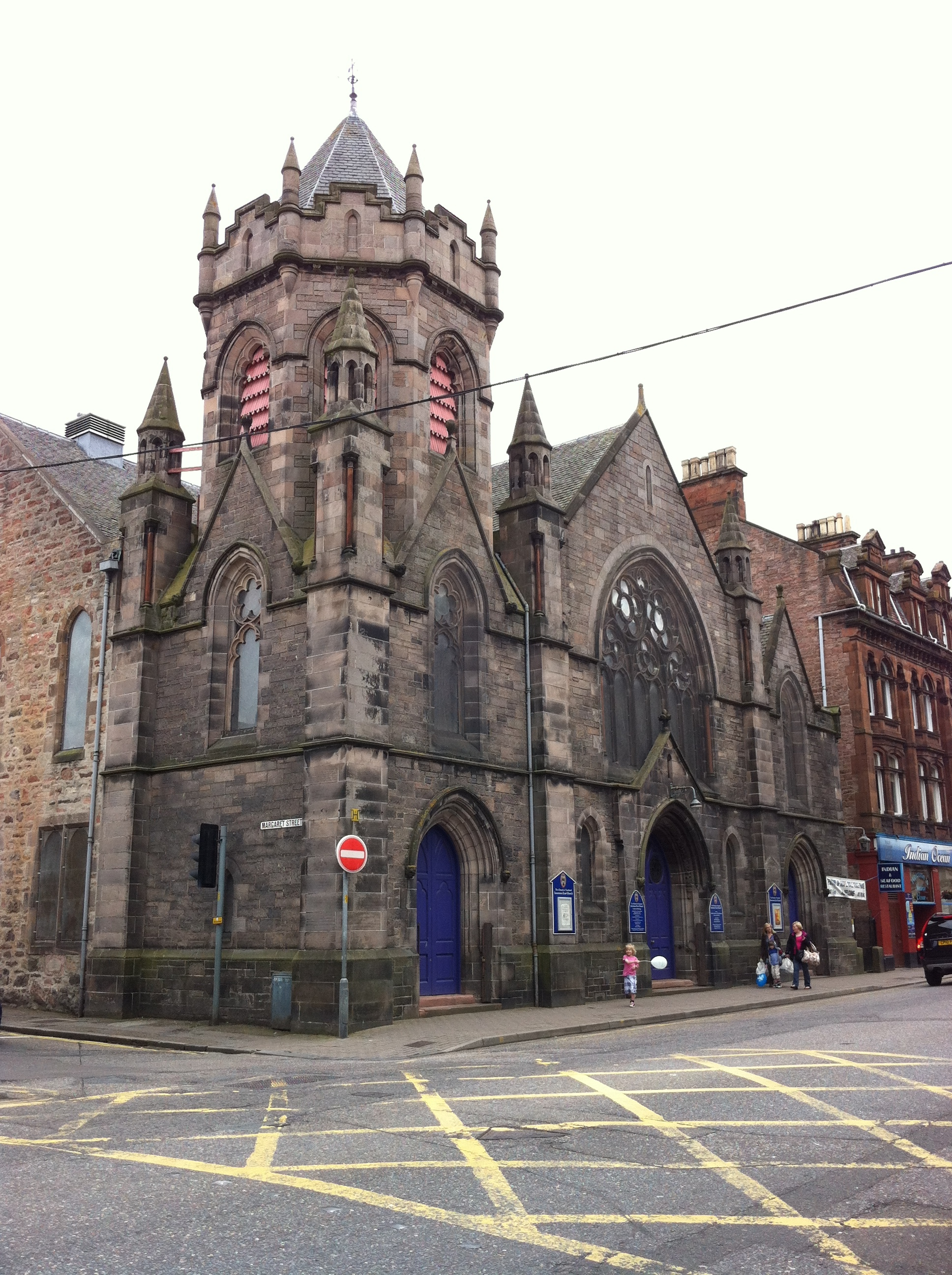
- East Church, Inverness
- East Church, Inverness
- 57°28′49.06″N 4°13′34.97″W
- Location: Inverness
- Country: Scotland
- Denomination: Church of Scotland
- Churchmanship: Evangelical
- Website: invernesseast.com

Architecture
- Heritage designation: Category B listed
- Groundbreaking: 1798
- Completed: 1898

East Church, Inverness is a Category B listed building and former parish church of the Church of Scotland in Inverness.

== History ==
The church opened as a chapel of ease in 1798 but was rebuilt in 1852-1853. The street frontage was added in 1897-1898 by Ross & Macbeth.

East Church left the Church of Scotland during the disruption of 1843 and became Inverness East Free Church. In 1900 it joined with the United Presbyterian Church of Scotland to form the United Free Church of Scotland and became a United Free church. In 1929, with many other United Free churches, Inverness East Church, returned to the Church of Scotland.

The Church's parish included some of the city centre of Inverness, as well as the Longman, Drakies and Raigmore areas. Within the Raigmore estate, they have an outreach post known as 'The Shack' which was a former rent office for the estate. It is used as a drop in for those in need, as well as being the base for a lot of the work the congregation does in this area of the parish.

In 2022, Inverness Presbytery published plans to unify the parish with Inshes Church, and close East Church. Then final service was held on Sunday 5 March 2023. A. T. B. McGowan served as the final minister of the congregation, retiring from the charge on 1 February 2019.

In 2024, the building was bought by Cultarlann Inbhir Nis, a charity working to create a Gaelic cultural centre.

== List of Ministers ==
Below are the ministers of the East Church.

- Rev Ronald Bayne (1800 - 1808)
- Rev. Donald Martin (1808 - 1820)
- Rev. Robert Findlater (1821 - 1832)
- Rev. Finlay Cook (1833 - 1835)
- Rev. David Campbell (1836 - 1838)
- Rev. David Sutherland (1839 - 1875)
- Rev. John Mactavish (1877 - 1897)
- Rev. Dr. Allan Cameron (1892 - 1928)
- Rev. Andrew Barr (1921-1924)
- Rev. William Sutherland (1925 - 1939)
- Rev. William Paton Henderson (1940 - 1946)
- Rev. George Elliot Anderson (1946 - 1955)
- Rev. Donald Macfarlane (1955 - 1980)
- Rev. Aonghas Ian Macdonald (1981 - 2007)
- Rev. Andrew McGowan (2009 - 2019)

With the merger of Inshes Church and the East Church, the minister of the combined parish became Rev. David Scott, of Inshes East Church.
