= Jahja Ling =

American conductor

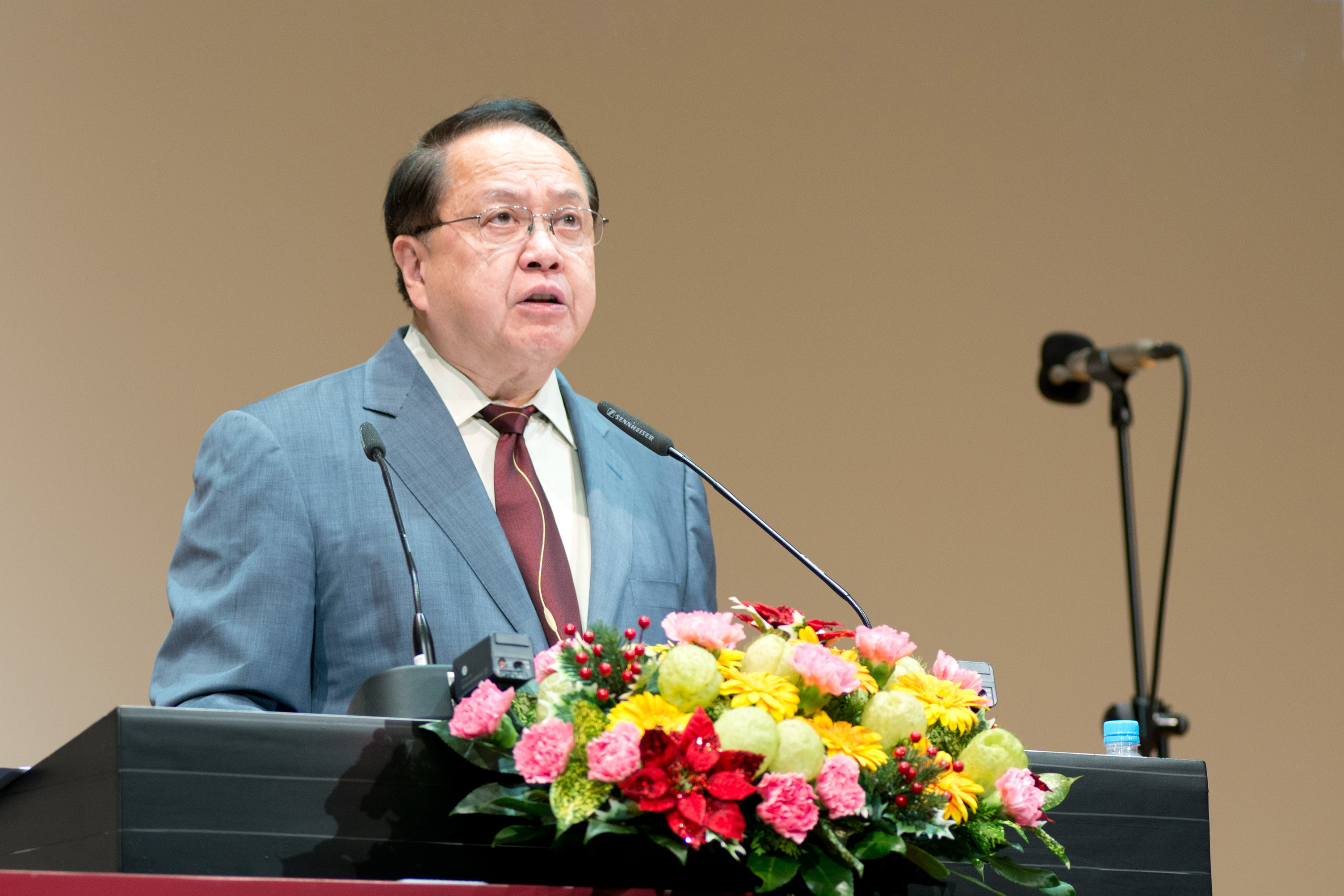
- Jahja Ling in 2015
- Born: 25 October 1951 (age 75); Jakarta, Indonesia
- Education: Juilliard School
- Occupations: Conductor, music director, pianist

Jahja Ling (Chinese: 林望傑; pinyin: Lín Wàng-jié) is an Indonesian conductor, music director and pianist. From 2004 to 2017, he was the music director and conductor at the San Diego Symphony. Following his retirement in 2017, he plans to do guest conducting, as well as teaching and volunteering. He is of Hokkien Chinese descent, formerly an Indonesian citizen and is now an American citizen. He was the first conductor of Chinese descent to serve as music director of a major U.S. orchestra.

== Early life ==
He was born 25 October 1951 in Jakarta, Indonesia, and began to play the piano at age 4. He studied at the Yayasan Pendidikan Musik (Indonesian: Foundation for Musical Education) in Jakarta. At age 17 he received a Rockefeller award scholarship and went to study at The Juilliard School in New York City. At Juilliard he earned a master's degree, studied piano with Mieczyslaw Munz and conducting with John Nelson. Ling then went to study orchestral conducting at the Yale School of Music under Otto-Werner Mueller and received a doctor of musical arts degree. He was also a conducting fellow at the Los Angeles Philharmonic Institute.

== Career ==
Ling served as founding Music Director of the Cleveland Orchestra Youth Orchestra (1986-1993) and the San Francisco Symphony Youth Orchestra (1981–84), where Ling served as SFSYO's first music director from 1981-1984. He and the SFSYO were selected to perform for Queen Elizabeth II while on a State visit to San Francisco in 1983. Ling was on the conducting roster of the Cleveland Orchestra from 1984–2005, serving as resident conductor from 1985-2002.

Ling debuted with The Cleveland Orchestra in 1985, and has conducted the orchestra in 38 consecutive seasons. He was also a member of the conducting staff of The Cleveland Orchestra for 20 years, from 1984 to 2005. From 1985 to 2002, he served as resident conductor, leading the orchestra in over 400 concerts and over 600 works at Severance Hall, the annual Blossom Festival, and while on tour. During his tenure as resident conductor, Ling led the orchestra's annual concert in downtown Cleveland, heard by more than a million people since first presented in 1990.

For 6 seasons, from 2000-2005, Ling served as music director of the Blossom Festival and is the last person to have served with that title.

From 1988-2002, Ling was music director of the Florida Orchestra and brought that orchestra from a community orchestra into one of the finest regional orchestras in the country.

Starting in 2004, he was the music director of the San Diego Symphony, with an initial contract for 5 years which later was renewed as Green Contract. In 2014 he announced that the 2016-17 season would be his last. He conducted his final concert as music director in June 2017. His 13-year tenure is the longest in the history of the San Diego Symphony, and he is credited with rebuilding and revitalizing the orchestra. A highlight of his tenure was the orchestra's first-ever appearance at Carnegie Hall in 2013.

== Collaboration with others ==
In 1980, he was awarded Leonard Bernstein conducting Fellowship and Tanglewood Music Center, where Mr. Bernstein became one of his most influential mentors. In 1987 he made his Cleveland Orchestra debut and has appeared as piano soloist with numerous U.S. and international orchestras.

From 1998-2001, he also served as artistic director of the Taiwan Philharmonic (then under the name of National Concert Hall Symphony Orchestra) and in 2001 he led the Super World Orchestra in Tokyo, composed of principal musicians from 30 of the world's premier orchestras and broadcast on NHK. In 2009, he also conducted the World Wide Chinese Festival Orchestra including the most accomplished Chinese musicians selected from highest-ranked U.S. and European orchestras.

In May 2000, his debut performance with the St. Louis Symphony and cellist Yo-Yo Ma was featured on the ABC News program in conjunction with a world premiere performance of a Cello Concerto composed by 20/20 anchor Hugh Downs.

Since 1965 he has been volunteering with the Reformed Evangelical Ministry of Dr. Stephen Tong in Jakarta, and in 1978 Tong and Ling co-founded Stephen Tong Evangelistic Ministries International, where he has served as the Vice President. His first performance was conducting Inauguration Concert "Mendelssohn's Symphony no.2 "Lobgesang" and the Others of The Cathedral of Messiah in Jakarta, with his wife, Jessy Chang and Jakarta Oratorio Society on Thursday, September 18, 2008. Under STEMI, he commits himself to visit Aula Simfonia Jakarta at least once a year He still serves as a volunteer Vice President of the Stephen Tong Evangelistic Ministries International (STEMI).

On June 15, 2012 Ling conducted famous pianist Lang Lang's 30th birthday concert with the Schleswig Holstein Festival Orchestra at O2 World in Berlin which was attended by more than 10,000 people and televised live in German and Spanish TVs. Lang Lang also performed with Ling and the San Diego Symphony at their annual 2012 OPUS Gala and together at a private event.

== Guest conductor ==
He has been guest conductor of all major orchestras in the United States, including the symphony orchestras of Baltimore, Boston, Chicago, Cleveland, Dallas, Detroit, Houston, Minneapolis, New York, Los Angeles, Pittsburgh, San Francisco, Seattle, St. Louis, St. Paul, Washington DC

Ling has appeared as guest conductor for most of the prominent orchestras in Asia, Europe and Australia including Adelaide Symphony, the Chamber Orchestra of Lausanne, China Philharmonic in Beijing, Copenhagen Philharmonic, Guangzhou Symphony Orchestra, Hong Kong Philharmonic, Jakarta Symphony Orchestra, Leipzig Gewandhaus Orchestra, Macao Symphony Orchestra, Malaysia Philharmonic, MDR Symphony Orchestra in Leipzig, NAtional Symphony Orchestra of Taiwan, Netherlands Radio Philharmonic, NDR Radio-Philharmonie in Hanover, NDR Symphony Orchestra in Hamburg, Orchestre Nationale du Capitole de Toulouse, Royal Philharmonic of London, Rundfunk-Sinfonieorchester Berlin, Scottish Chamber Orchestra, Shanghai Symphony, Singapore Symphony, Stockholm Philharmonic, Sydney Symphony, Taipei City Symphony, and Tokyo's Yomiuri Nippon Symphony.

== Recordings ==
Mr. Ling's recordings include a range of works on the Telarc, Azica Records, and Continuum labels, featuring recent recording of the works by Bright Sheng with the San Diego Symphony as well as performances by the Florida Orchestra, Royal Philharmonic and the Scottish Chamber Orchestra, one of which was nominated for a Grammy award. His performance of the world premiere of Ellen Taaffe Zwilich's Third Symphony with the New York Philharmonic is included in the orchestra's "American Celebrations" collection. Also released is a special edition CD featuring Mr. Ling and the Cleveland Orchestra performing Saint-Saëns' Symphony No. 3 "Organ" for the rededication of the Norton Memorial Organ at Cleveland's Severance Hall.

== Achievements and awards ==
Most of these are adopted and compiled from his official website:

- In 1968, he won the Jakarta Piano Competition.
- In 1970 to 1975, he received the John D Rockfefeller 3rd Fund Grant to study at Juilliard.
- In April 1977, he was awarded the Bronze Medal in the Arthur Rubinstein International Piano Competition (Jerusalem, Israel).
- In June 1978, he received a Certificate of Honor at the Tchaikovsky International Piano Competition (Moscow, Russia).
- In May 1983 he conducted the San Francisco Symphony Youth Symphony in a special concert honoring Queen Elizabeth II and Prince Philip.
- In 1985, he received the Seaver/National Endowment for the Arts Conductor's Award and the Leonard Bernstein Conducting Fellowship at Tanglewood. Subsequently, he was selected by Leonard Bernstein, who became one of his most influential mentors, to be a Conducting Fellow at the Los Angeles Philharmonic Institute.
- In 1991, he performed US National Anthem with the Florida Orchestra at Super Bowl XXV with singer star Whitney Houston which many still hailed as the best rendition of the Anthem. The audio and video of that performance earned platinum record status.
- In September 2006, The U.S. House of Representatives presented a Congressional Record of his outstanding achievements in the U.S. Capitol.
- His "Concert in Tribute and Remembrance" with The Cleveland Orchestra for 9/11 received an Emmy award.
- In 1991 he has been nominated for the Grammy Award for his Telarc CD Recording with Rolf Smedvig and the Scottish Chamber Orchestra.

== Personal life ==
He is a Reformed Protestant and says that Christianity has had a major influence on him. His conversion occurred when he was a teenager, before he went to the US. Since then he has been encouraged and confirmed his vocation by Stephen Tong, his closest spiritual mentor. Jahja Ling is also a key figure in Stephen Tong Evangelical Ministries International (STEMI), and works closely with Tong in various Christian missions.

Ling and his first wife, Jane, had two sons, Gabriel and Daniel. She died of cancer in 1998. After mourning for three years following his first wife’s death, he remarried in 2001. His second wife is Jessie Chang, a Taiwanese Christian pianist, and they have two daughters.

In 2014, he announced at a meeting with the board of directors, staff, and musicians of the San Diego Symphony that he planned to leave after the 2016-17 season. He said, "After the 2016-17 season, I look forward to pursuing more international guest conducting, passing on the great musical traditions to the next generation through teaching, and continuing with my volunteer work in Christian mission."

Cultural offices
Preceded by Irwin Hoffman	Music Director, Florida Orchestra; 1988–2002	Succeeded by Stefan Sanderling
Preceded by Jung-Ho Pak	Music Director, San Diego Symphony; 2004–	Succeeded by incumbent
