= A. T. B. McGowan =

Scottish theologian and pastor

The Reverend Professor Andrew McGowan
- Born: Andrew Thomson Blake McGowan; January 30, 1954
- Education: University of Aberdeen
- Occupation(s): Minister and author
- Spouse: June McGowan
- Children: 3
- Religion: Christianity
- Denomination: Church of Scotland
- Ordination: Church of Scotland
- Theological work
- Language: English
- Tradition or movement: Christianity; Presbyterianism

Andrew Thomson Blake McGowan is a Scottish theologian and pastor. McGowan was the founding principal of Highland Theological College, serving from 1994 to 2009, after which he became minister of the Inverness East Church of Scotland congregation. He chairs the Theological Commission of the World Reformed Fellowship, and is president of the Scottish Evangelical Theology Society.

== Personal life ==
Andrew McGowan grew up in Uddingston, Scotland. He attended Tannochside Primary School, and then Uddingston Grammar School. During his schooling years, he met his wife, June, who he has been married to for over 40 years. He attended Viewpark Parish Church of Scotland in Uddingston. Together, they have three sons: Scott, David and Christopher.

== Ministry ==
McGowan was raised within the Church of Scotland, and when he was 14 became a Christian. During that year, he sensed a call to the ministry.

He attended Aberdeen University as part of his theological training straight from Secondary School. His first full time placement was in St Cuthbert's Church, Edinburgh. His first charge as a Minister was in Mallaig and the Small Isles. There he had six places of worship to oversee, five of which were accessible only by boat.

From Mallaig, McGowan moved to serve at Causewayend Parish Church for two years. He had served there as a Trainee Minister in his final year as a student at Aberdeen University, and was invited to serve again within the congregation - this time as a fully qualified minister - during a two-year interim period until both Causewayend Church and Powis Church united to form St. Stephen's Church of Scotland.

In 1998, he moved to be the Minister of Trinity Possil & Henry Drummond Church of Scotland, in the Possilpark area of Glasgow. He served there until 1994.

On 1 August 1994, McGowan took up post as the inaugural Principal of Highland Theological College, where he served until 2009. From there, he became minister of East Church, Inverness until 2019.

He became the Director of the Rutherford Centre for Reformed Theology, whose office was based at Highland Theological College. He retired on his 70th birthday, on 30 January 2024. He now lives in Alness with his wife, June.

== Publications ==
Professor McGowan's main publications are:

- The Federal Theology of Thomas Boston (Carlisle: Paternoster, 1997)
- Always Reforming: Explorations in Systematic Theology, Editor, (Leicester, England: IVP, 2006)
- The Divine Spiration of Scripture: Challenging Evangelical Perspectives (Nottingham, England: Apollos, 2007)
- The Person and Work of Christ: Understanding Jesus (Milton Keynes, England: Paternoster, 2012)
- Adam, Christ and Covenant (London, England: Apollos, 2016).

McGowan's 2007 book, The Divine Spiration of Scripture "led to some considerable discussion in evangelical circles." In it, McGowan suggested the word "spiration" in place of "inspiration" and argued against the concept of biblical inerrancy, instead being in favour of a type of infallibility. Norman Geisler and William C. Roach suggest that McGowan's "challenge to inerrancy is one of the most dangerous because it is clear, direct, and comes from within evangelicalism."
