= Messiah Cathedral =

Reformed Protestant church in Jakarta, Indonesia

- Katedral Mesias 弥赛亚大教堂
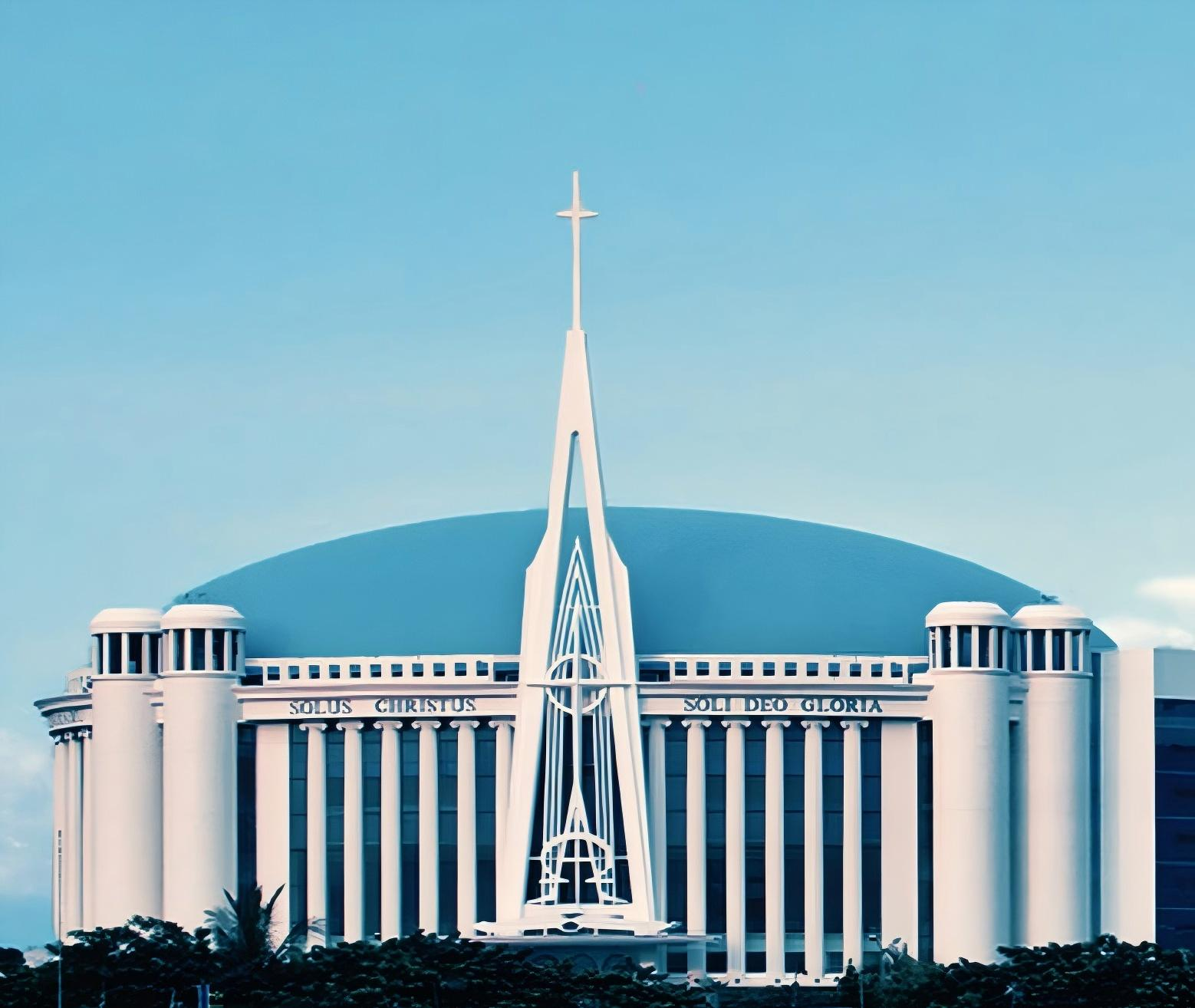

- Location within Jakarta
- 6°09′13″S 106°50′38″E
- Location: Central Jakarta, Jakarta
- Address: Jl. Industri Blok B-14 Kav.1, Gunung Sahari Selatan, Kemayoran
- Country: Indonesia
- Language(s): Indonesian, English, Mandarin
- Denomination: Reformed Christianity
- Religious institute: Indonesian Reformed Evangelical Church
- Website: pusat.grii.org

History
- Status: Church
- Founder: Stephen Tong

Architecture
- Functional status: Active
- Architect: Stephen Tong
- Style: Modern Neoclassical with Neo-Gothic elements
- Groundbreaking: 2006
- Completed: 2008

Specifications
- Capacity: 8000

Clergy
- Pastor: Stephen Tong

Messiah Cathedral (Indonesian: Katedral Mesias) is an Indonesian megachurch of the predominantly Indonesian-Chinese Indonesian Reformed Evangelical Church in Kemayoran, Jakarta. The Dedication Service of Messiah Cathedral was held on 20 September 2008, followed by the Inaugural Service on 21 September 2008, which also marked the 19th anniversary of Indonesian Reformed Evangelical Church (GRII) as a dedication to Lord Jesus Christ by Stephen Tong the founder and principle architect of the this church building.

Despite the name, this church building is not a true cathedral in the sense of "the seat of a bishop" (it does not house a cathedra, i.e. bishop's throne), since the GRII church is of presbyterian polity. The church/cathedral is part of the larger Reformed Millennium Center Indonesia (RMCI) building complex and is "the head - front building". The other parts of this, "the body - middle building", are International Reformed Evangelical Seminary or STT Reformed Injili Internasional, the concert hall Aula Simfonia Jakarta, the International Reformed Evangelical Seminary (IRES) as many as its facilities (the library "Augustine", the "Martin Luther" Chapel, dormitory, mense, guest room, etc.), the rest "the tail - end building" are Sophilia Fine Arts Center, and Calvin Institute of Technology (CIT).

The church has a capacity of about 8,000, as noted in various newspapers. Whereas it is a sum of many separated halls and chamber, i.e., 4,416 seats in Messiah Hall as main Hall, 1,753 seats in John Calvin Hall, 450 seats in Hosanna Hall, 300 seats in Agape Chamber.

National Gospel Convention (KIN) 2013 and 2014 have conducted in this place each year. This venue also hosted the International Gospel Convention (Konvensi Injil Internasional) 2025, held from 1 to 5 October 2025.

This megachurch is the first church in Indonesia that is built without foreign funding

== Gallery ==
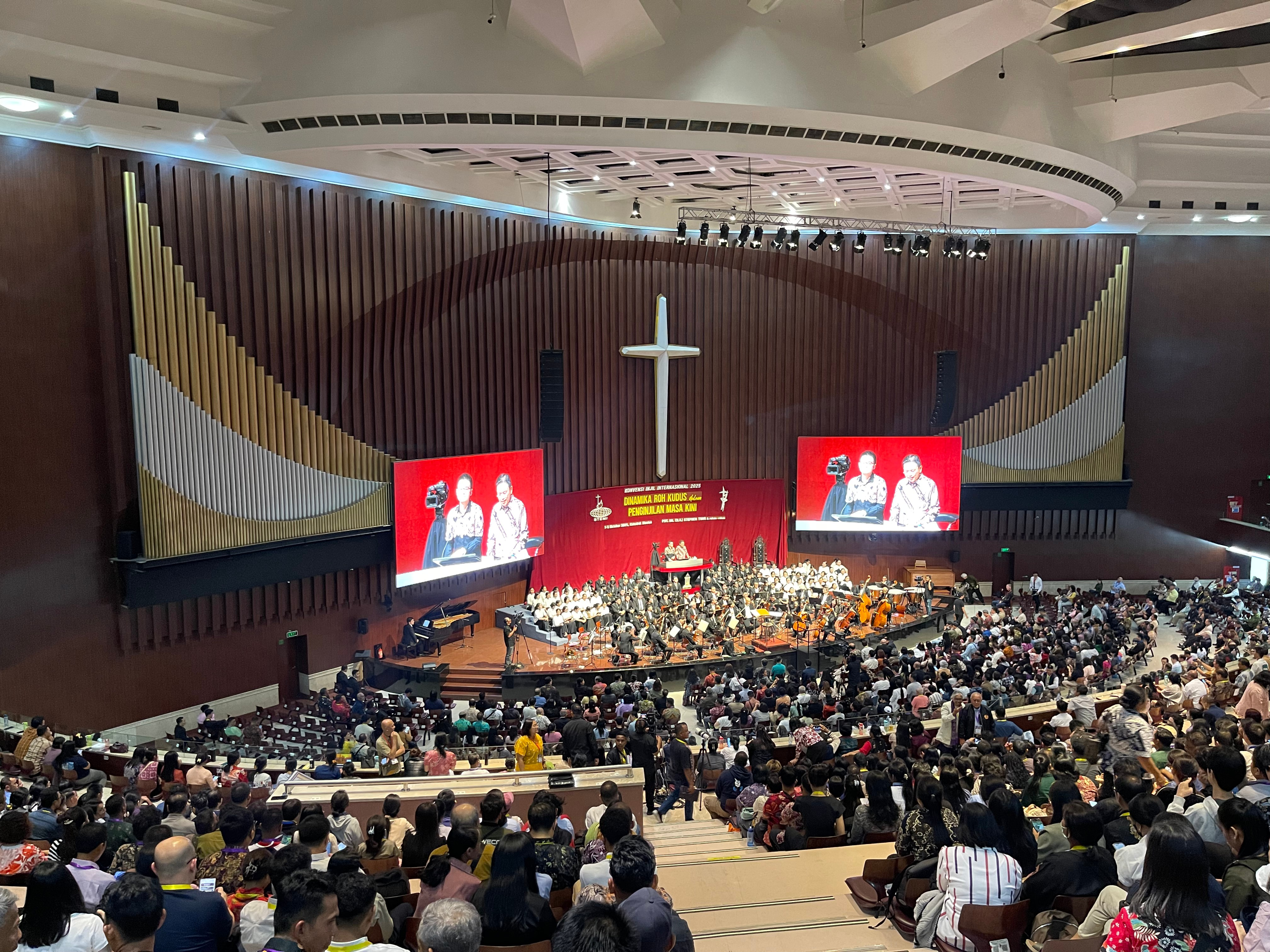

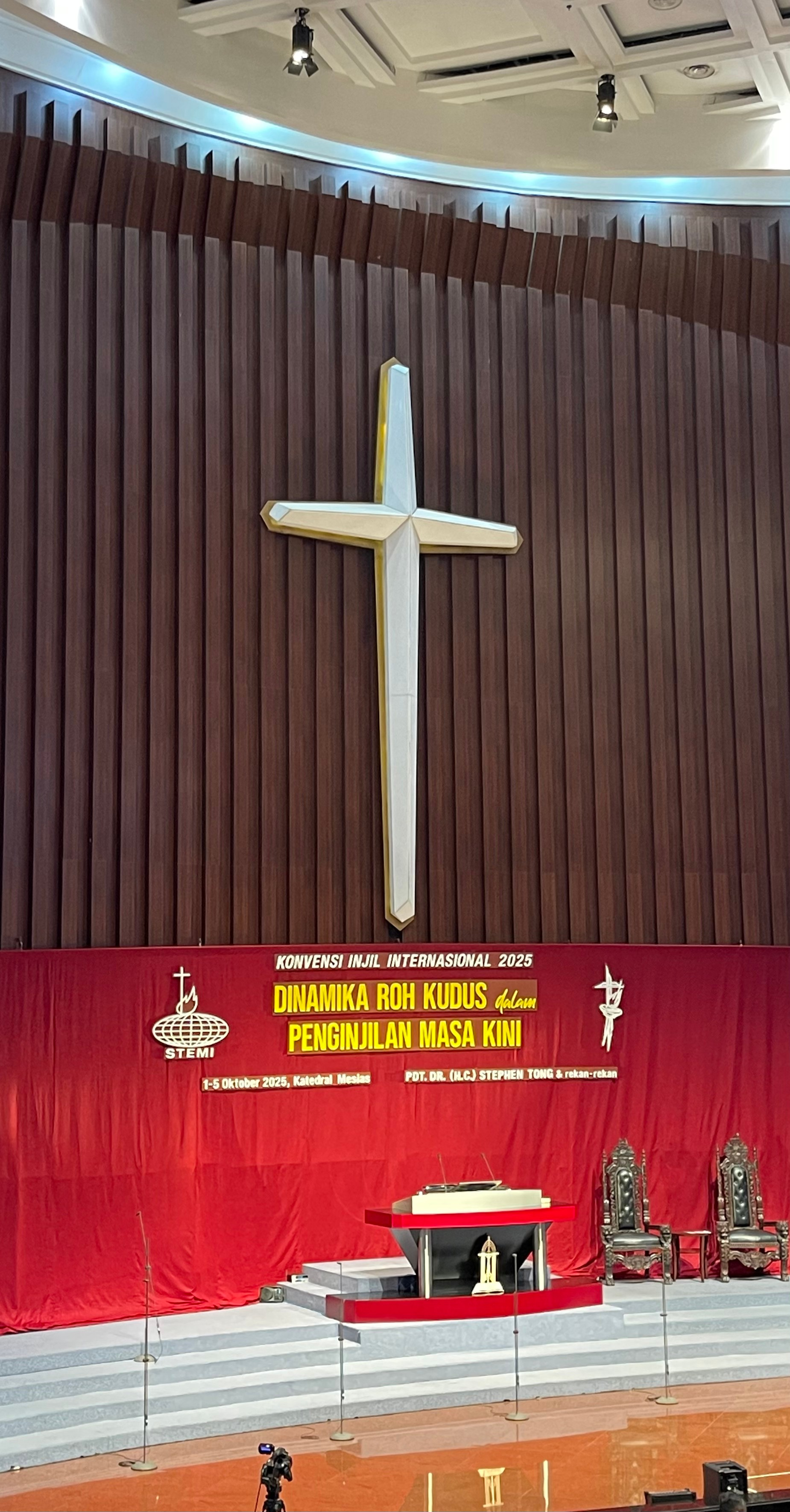

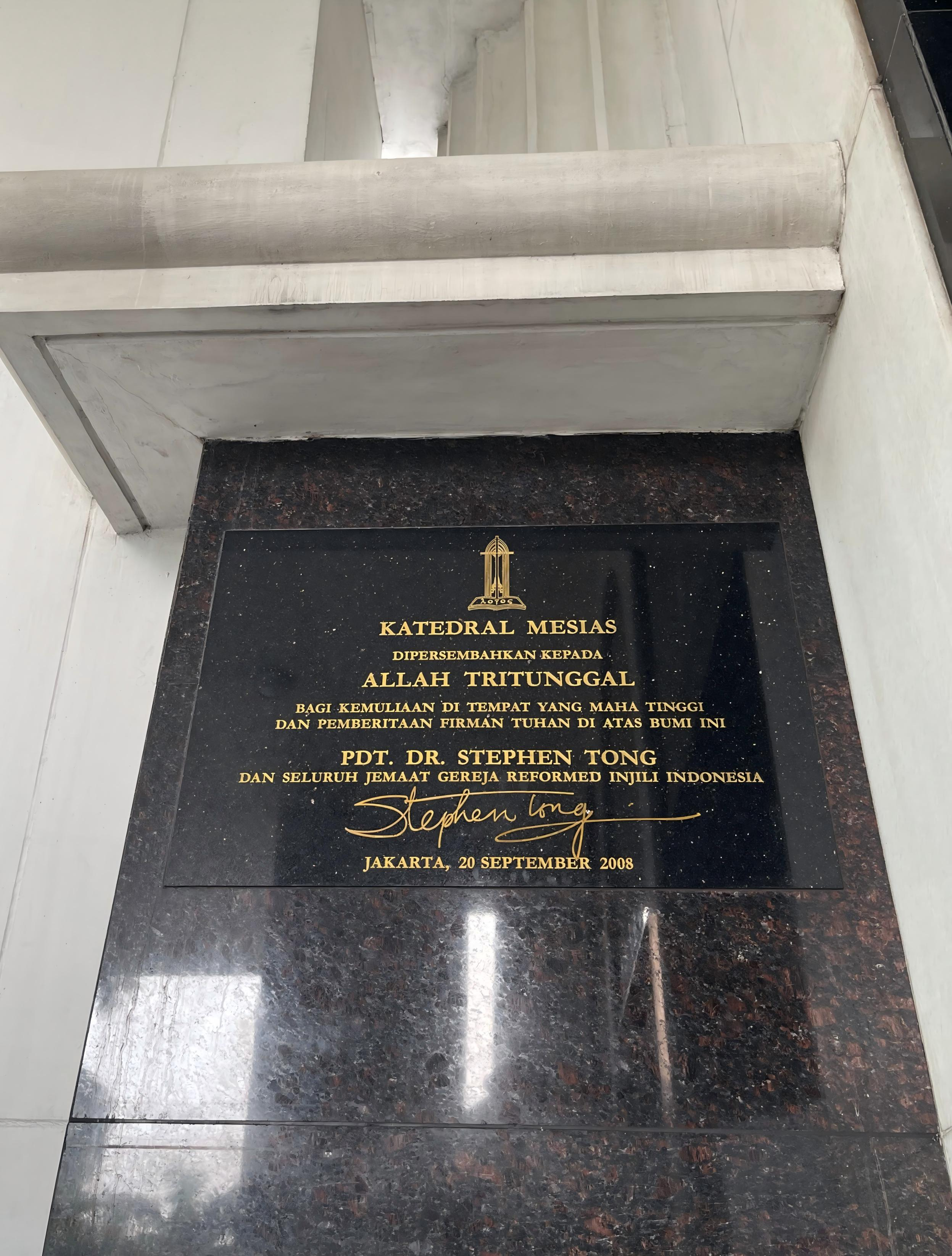

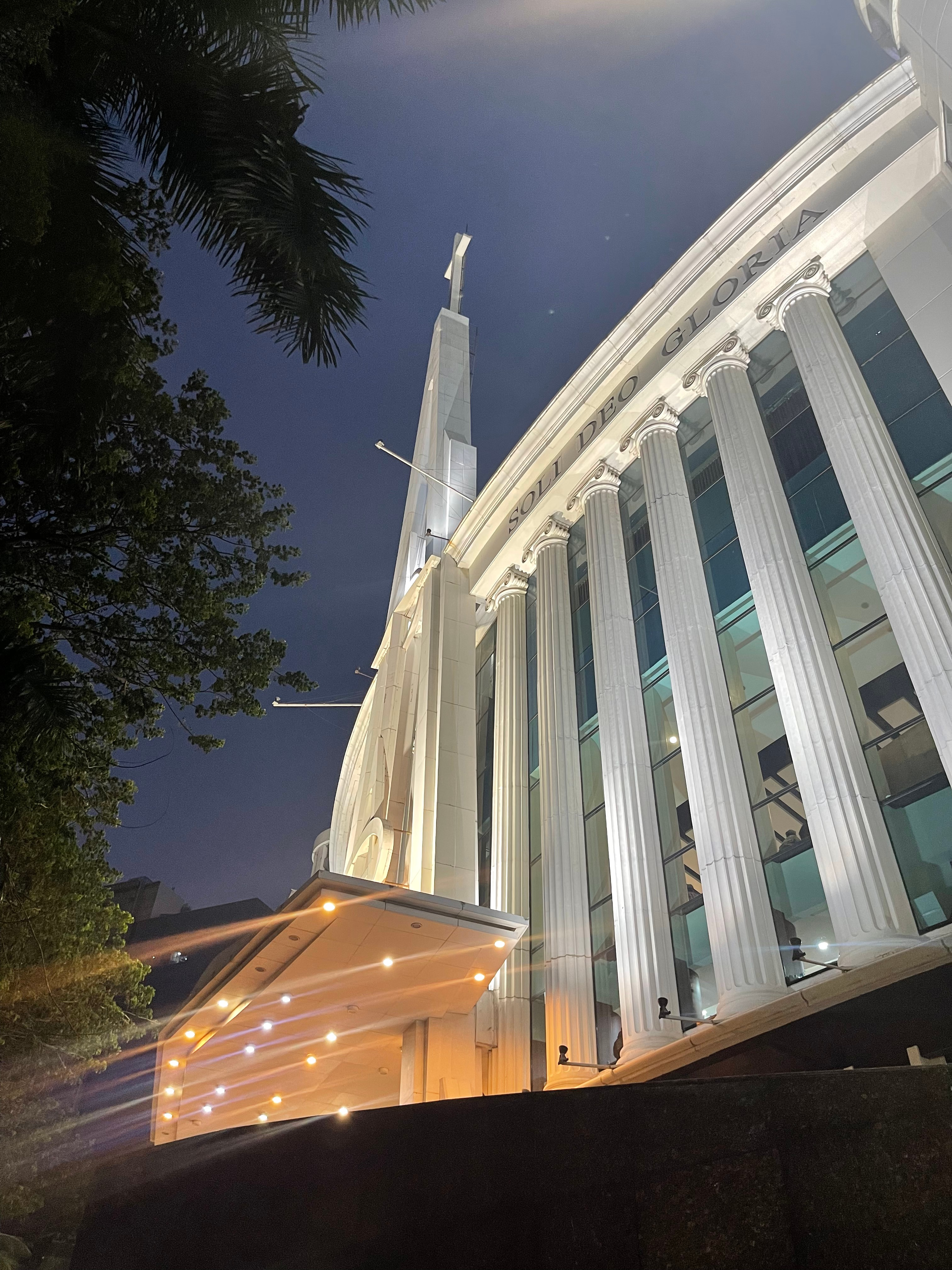

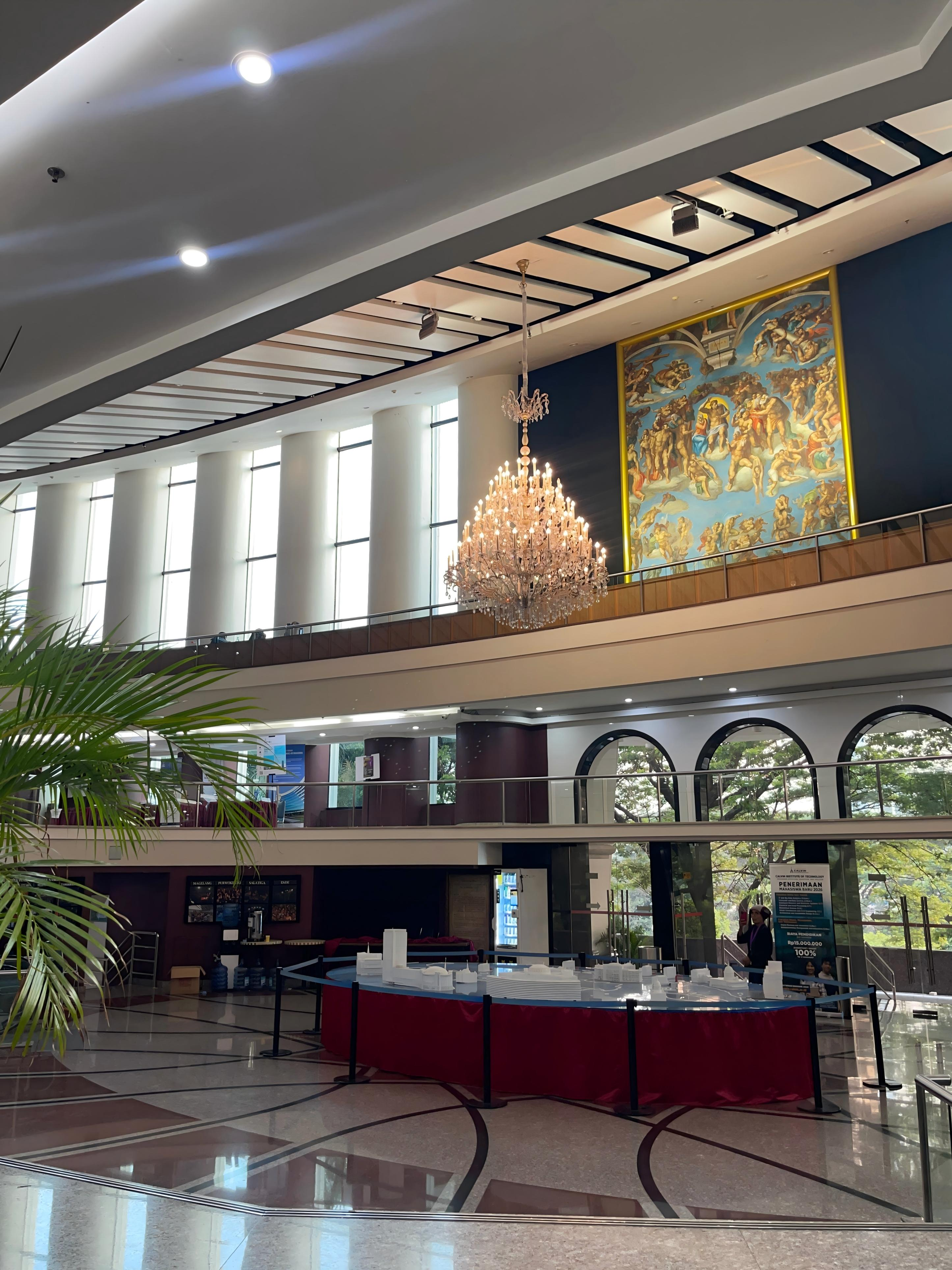

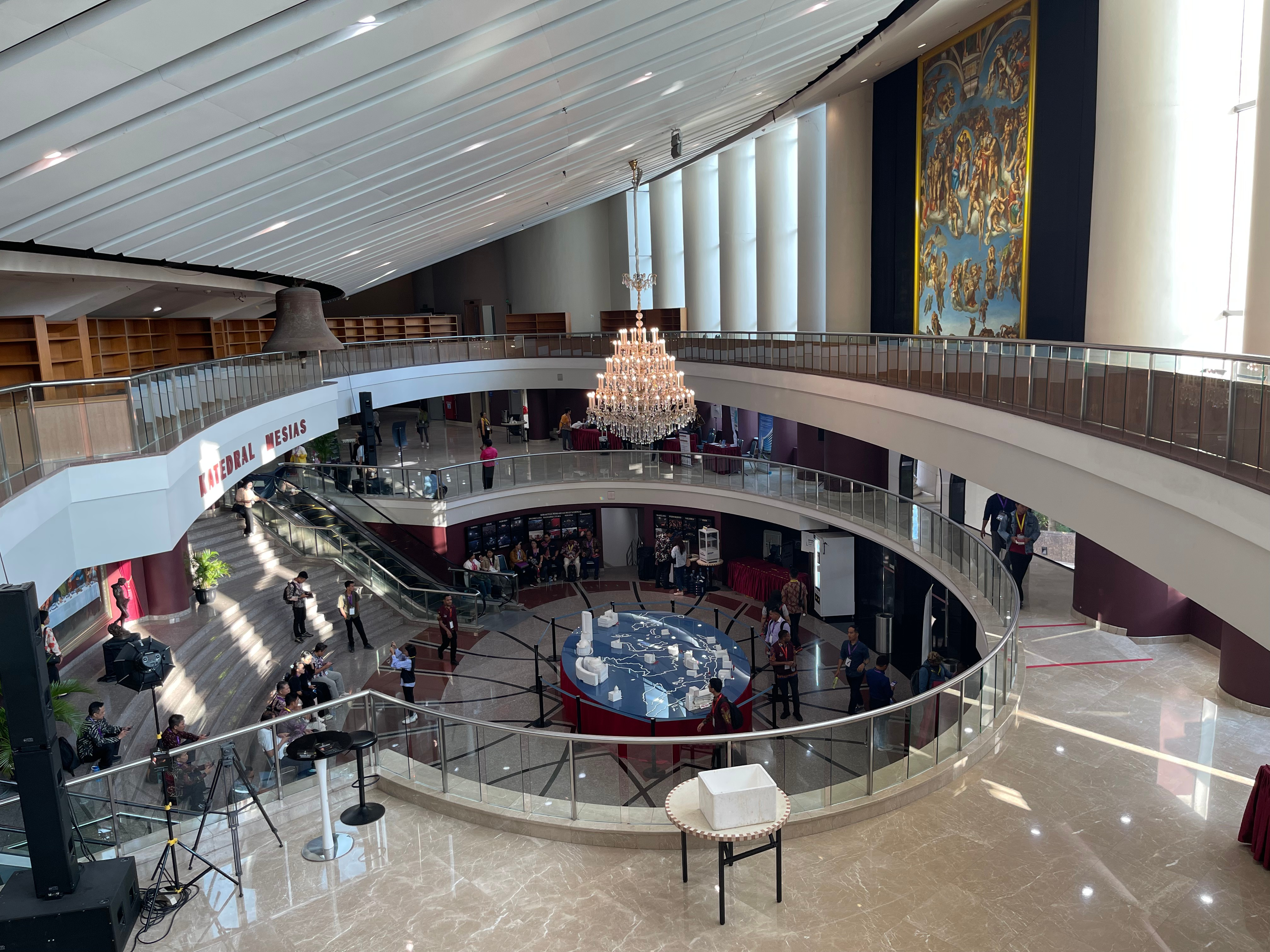

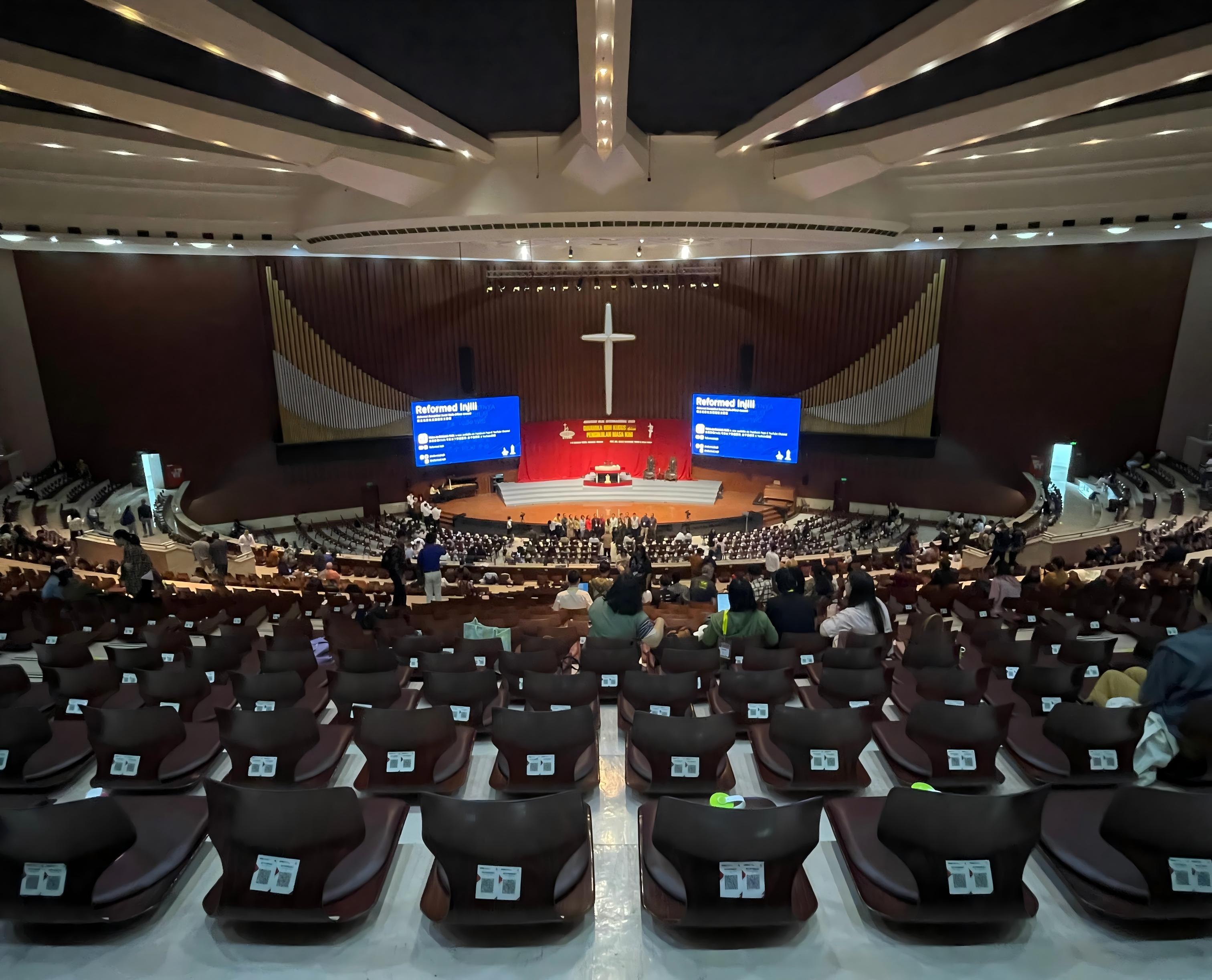

== See also ==
- List of church buildings in Indonesia
- Stephen Tong
- Protestantism in Indonesia
