= Orchestra Nova San Diego =

Orchestra Nova San Diego (formerly known as the San Diego Chamber Orchestra) was a chamber orchestra based in San Diego, California. It operated for 28 years, from 1984 through 2012. The founding director was Donald Barra; in 2006 Jung-Ho Pak took over as artistic director and conductor.

The San Diego Chamber Orchestra was formed in 1983 and performed its first concerts in 1984. The ensemble changed its name to Orchestra Nova San Diego in the fall of 2009.

The orchestra performed in many different locations; its primary venues were Sherwood Auditorium at Museum of Contemporary Art San Diego in La Jolla and the Irwin M. Jacobs Qualcomm Hall in Sorrento Valley Other venues included the Poway Center for the Performing Arts, Coronado Performing Arts Center at the Coronado School of the Arts, and the California Center for the Arts, Escondido (CCAE).

The group had 35 full-time members, with up to 15 additional musicians being added for special occasions and Pops concerts. The group's season ran fall through spring and typically included five Classics Series concerts, three pops concerts, and Handel's Messiah in December.

The 2011–2012 season was completely sold out. However, the 2012–2013 season did not begin as scheduled in October 2012. Two days before the season was scheduled to open, the first three concerts were cancelled due to an impasse in negotiations with the American Federation of Musicians union. Reportedly, Pak wanted the right to hand-pick musicians for individual concerts, while the musicians wanted a season contract. After the cancellation of the opening concerts Pak resigned abruptly, giving no reason, and the rest of the season was cancelled shortly thereafter. In December 2012 the ensemble announced that it had filed for liquidation (Chapter 7) bankruptcy. There was no provision for refunds to people who had purchased tickets, although some other arts organizations offered exchange privileges.
