= Indonesian Reformed Evangelical Church =

Christian denomination in Indonesia

- Gereja Reformed Injili Indonesia 印尼归正福音教会
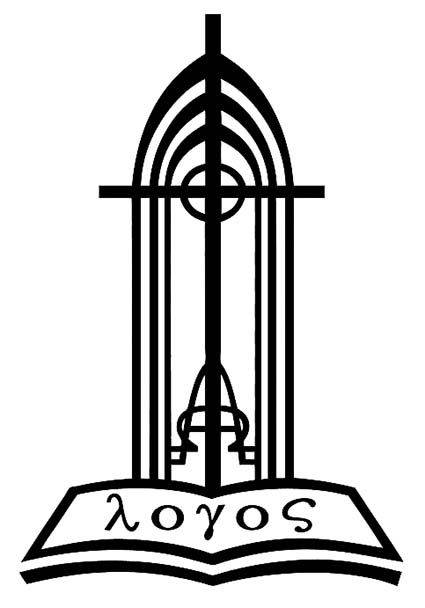
- Logo of Indonesian Reformed Evangelical Church
- Abbreviation: GRII or IREC
- Classification: Christianity
- Orientation: Protestant
- Scripture: Bible
- Theology: Reformed Christianity
- Polity: Presbyterian
- Leader & Founder: Stephen Tong
- Chairman of the Synod's Executive Board: Antonius Steven Un
- Associations: World Reformed Fellowship
- Region: Indonesia, Singapore, Malaysia, Australia, Europe, China, Taiwan, Hong Kong, Japan, Canada
- Language: Indonesian, English, Mandarin
- Origin: 1989; Jakarta
- Congregations: 90±
- Members: 7000+
- Primary schools: 2
- Secondary schools: 2
- Tertiary institutions: 1
- Seminaries: 1
- Official website: https://grii.org/
- Reformed Injili: https://www.stemi.id

The Reformed Evangelical Church of Indonesia (Indonesian: Gereja Reformed Injili Indonesia; Chinese: 印尼歸正福音教會), abbreviated GRII, or International Reformed Evangelical Church (IREC) for its overseas congregations, is a Reformed Christian church that is headquartered in Jakarta, Indonesia. It was founded by Stephen Tong, a Chinese-born Indonesian evangelist.

== History ==
Andrew Gih of the Evangelize China Fellowship established the Southeast Asia Bible Seminary in Malang, East Java in 1952, and Tong graduated from it in 1961, establishing the church in 1989 following many years of preaching and evangelism.

=== Timeline ===
- In 1974 Tong conducts seminars in Surabaya and 2 years later become a guest lecturer in China Evangelical Seminary.
- Later in 1984 turned to Jakarta to uphold Reformed theology and evangelical spirit. Two years later in 1986 he was the co-founder of Reformed Evangelical School of Theology in Jakarta and Surabaya, and library and printing station that provides Christian books.
- In 1989 Tong founded the Reformed Evangelical Church of Indonesia (GRII).
- 1991 - 2006 Tong serves as Rector in the Indonesian Reformed Evangelical Seminary (now: Indonesian Reformed Seminary)
- In 1996 Stephen Tong become the chairman of the church Synod and in 1998 he served as a Rector in The Reformed Institute in Indonesia
- In 2008 Tong received an honorary degree from Westminster Theological Seminary in Philadelphia, Pennsylvania.

Stephen Tong founded Reformed Evangelical Church of Indonesia in 1989 to establish a Reformed theology-based church and congregations who are committed to evangelism.

The GRII is headquartered in the Reformed Millennium Center Indonesia, in Kemayoran, Jakarta, where it has its largest church, the Messiah Cathedral. It has congregations in other major cities in Indonesia, as well as in Singapore, Malaysia, Australia, China, Japan, Taiwan, Germany and the US

== Beliefs ==
The church subscribes to the Reformed confessions generally accepted by Reformed churches, but it has its own unique confession of faith. Some churches use the Westminster Confession of Faith and the Heidelberg Catechism.

== Church organization ==
Since 2018, the Head of Synod of the Reformed Evangelical Church of Indonesia is Antonius Steven Un, the senior pastor of GRII Kebon Jeruk.

The Reformed Evangelical Church of Indonesia and its affiliated institutions have female evangelists, lecturers, and church council members. They are allowed to preach and assume authoritative roles, although they are not ordained.

- Benyamin Intan, pastor, is a member of the board of directors for the World Reformed Fellowship.
- FIRES (Fellowship of Indonesian Reformed Evangelical Students) led by Edward Oei.
- STEMI (Stephen Tong Evangelistic Ministries International) led by Stephen Tong as movement to reach international community in Christ.

== Recent issues ==
Stephen Tong himself has preached the Gospel to 1,5 million Indonesians in 2012. According to the International Evangelism Fellowship's adaptation of the press release by the Indonesian Evangelical Reformed Church until November 2012, the Reformed Evangelical Church's sermons have reached 1.5 million. 700 preaching assemblies that was led by Stephen Tong were held. In October 200,000 people were able to hear the Gospel. The church reaped great evangelisation work in 2012.

In a four-days evangelistic outreach in December 2012, Reverend Tong preached in the Messiah Cathedral in Jakarta to 30,000 attenders.

On December 28, 2019, at the National Reformed Evangelical Convention (NREC), an annually held convention in Indonesia, Reverend Tong brought up an issue that the church was currently experiencing: a crisis of male servants to serve as Sunday school teachers and a vacant of fatherly authority in children's life because Sunday school teachers are predominantly women. He called for the young generation, especially men, to surrender themselves as servants of God to serve as Sunday school teachers in their respective churches.

== Worship center ==
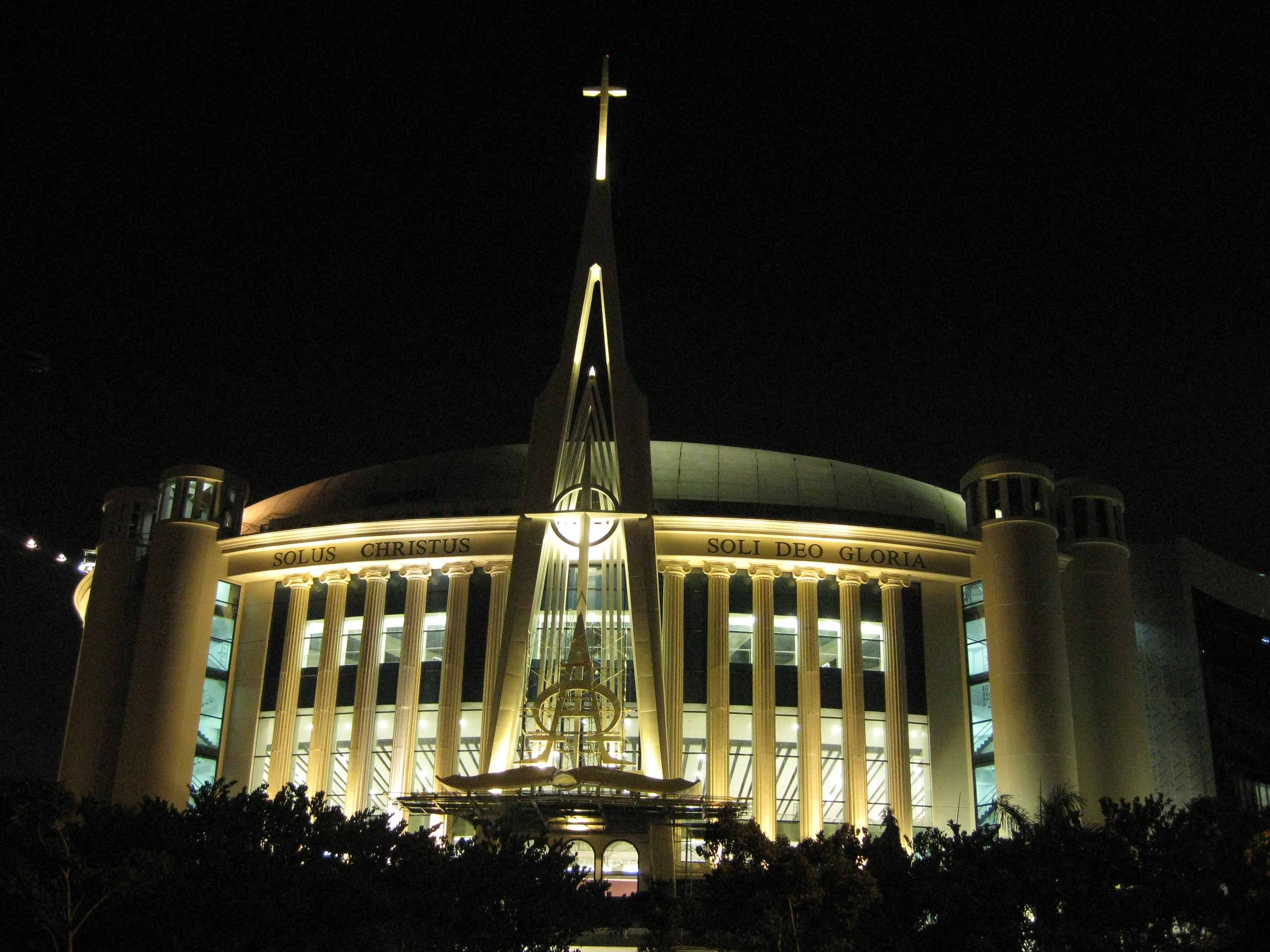
Messiah Cathedral, captured from Kemayoran Street.

In 2008, a new building for the Reformed Evangelical Church in Jakarta called Reformed Millennium Center of Indonesia (RMCI), which includes The Messiah Cathedral (a 4800-seat auditorium), was finished. It took 16 years to persuade the Indonesian government to issue a permit to build the church. The church building was personally designed by Tong himself. It is one of the largest Chinese Christian evangelical church facilities in the world, with 600,000 square feet (56,000 m^{2}) of space. In the Calvin auditorium, concerts were held in the opening of the Cathedral in 2008. The building also includes a theological seminary, STT Reformed Injili Internasional (International Reformed Evangelical Seminary), founded by the Synod of Reformed Evangelical Church of Indonesia in cooperation with Reformed Institute for Christianity and the 21st Century (Stephen Tong Evangelistic Ministries International). The seminary has a strong relation with Westminster Theological Seminary.

== Congregations ==
=== Indonesia ===
Greater Jakarta (17)

- GRII Pusat
- GRII Bintaro
- GRII Bogor
- GRII BSD
- GRII Buaran
- GRII Cibubur
- GRII Cikarang
- GRII Depok
- GRII Gading Serpong
- GRII Karawaci
- GRII Kebon Jeruk
- GRII Kelapa Gading
- GRII Kuningan
- GRII Pondok Indah
- MRII Harapan Indah
- MRII Pantai Indah Kapuk
- MRII Sunter

Jawa & Bali (15)

- GRII Andhika
- GRII Bandung
- GRII Citra Raya
- GRII Denpasar
- GRII Gempol
- GRII Graha Famili
- GRII Malang
- GRII Ngagel Jaya
- GRII Semarang
- GRII Sidoarjo
- GRII Solo
- GRII Kertajaya
- GRII Yogyakarta
- PRII Kediri
- PRII Magelang

Sumatera (8)

- GRII Batam
- GRII Medan
- GRII Palembang
- MRII Bandar Lampung
- MRII Jambi
- PRII Balige
- PRII Pangkalpinang
- PRII Pekanbaru

Kalimantan (4)

- GRII Balikpapan
- GRII Samarinda
- MRII Pontianak
- PRII Banjarmasin

Sulawesi & Maluku (4)

- MRII Ambon
- MRII Makassar
- MRII Manado
- MRII Ternate

Nusa Tenggara Timur (1)

- MRII Kupang

=== Overseas (33) ===
Asia (24)

- Singapore (3)
  - GRII Singapore
  - MRII Singapore (English)
  - MRII Singapore (Mandarin)
- Malaysia (6)
  - GRII Kuala Lumpur (Mandarin)
  - MRII Kuala Lumpur
  - MRII Kuching (Mandarin)
  - MRII Klang Valley
  - PRII Sibu (Mandarin)
  - PRII Bintulu (Mandarin)
- Taiwan (5)
  - GRII Taipei
  - GRII Taipei (Mandarin)
  - MRII Xin Dian (Mandarin)
  - PRII Xizhi (Mandarin)
  - MRII Taichung
- Japan (1)
  - MRII Tokyo
- Mainland China (10)
  - GRII Guangzhou
  - GRII Hongkong (Cantonese）
  - GRII Shanghai
  - MRII Beijing
  - MRII Xiamen
  - PRII Fuzhou
  - PRII Hangzhou
  - PRII Hongkong
  - PRII Nanjing
  - PRII Tianjin

Australia & New Zealand (4)

- GRII Melbourne
- GRII Perth
- GRII Sydney
- MRII Auckland

Europe (5)

- GRII Berlin
- MRII Bern
- MRII Hamburg
- MRII Munich
- PRII Stockholm

Canada (1)

- PRII Montreal

== International organisations ==
Member of the World Reformed Fellowship.

== See also ==
- Stephen Tong
- Messiah Cathedral
