= Protestant Church in the Netherlands =

Protestant denomination in the Netherlands

- Type: United church
- Classification: Protestant
- Orientation: Continental Reformed with a small Lutheran minority
- Scripture: Protestant Bible
- Theology: Reformed; Lutheran
- Polity: Mixture of presbyterian and congregationalist
- Associations: Conference of European Churches; World Communion of Reformed Churches; Communion of Protestant Churches in Europe; Lutheran World Federation; World Council of Churches
- Origin: 1 May 2004; Netherlands
- Merger of: Dutch Reformed Church; Reformed Churches in the Netherlands; Evangelical Lutheran Church in the Kingdom of the Netherlands
- Separations: Restored Reformed Church; Continued Reformed Churches in the Netherlands; (newly organized denominations; refused to participate in the merger)
- Congregations: 1,458
- Members: 1,387,000 (7.9% of the population)
- Ministers: 1,352
- Official website: www.protestantsekerk.nl

The Protestant Church in the Netherlands (Dutch: de Protestantse Kerk in Nederland, abbreviated PKN) is the largest Protestant denomination in the Netherlands, consisting of historical Calvinist and Lutheran churches.

== History ==
It was founded on 1 May 2004 as the merger of the vast majority of the Dutch Reformed Church, the vast majority of the Reformed Churches in the Netherlands, and the Evangelical Lutheran Church in the Kingdom of the Netherlands. The merger was the culmination of an organizational process started in 1961. Several orthodox Reformed and liberal churches did not merge into the new church.

The Protestant Church in the Netherlands (PKN) forms the country's second largest Christian denomination after the Catholic Church, with approximately 1.4 million members as per the church official statistics or some 7.9% of the population in 2023. It is the traditional faith of the Dutch Royal Family – a remnant of historical dominance of the Dutch Reformed Church, the main predecessor of the Protestant Church.

== Beliefs ==
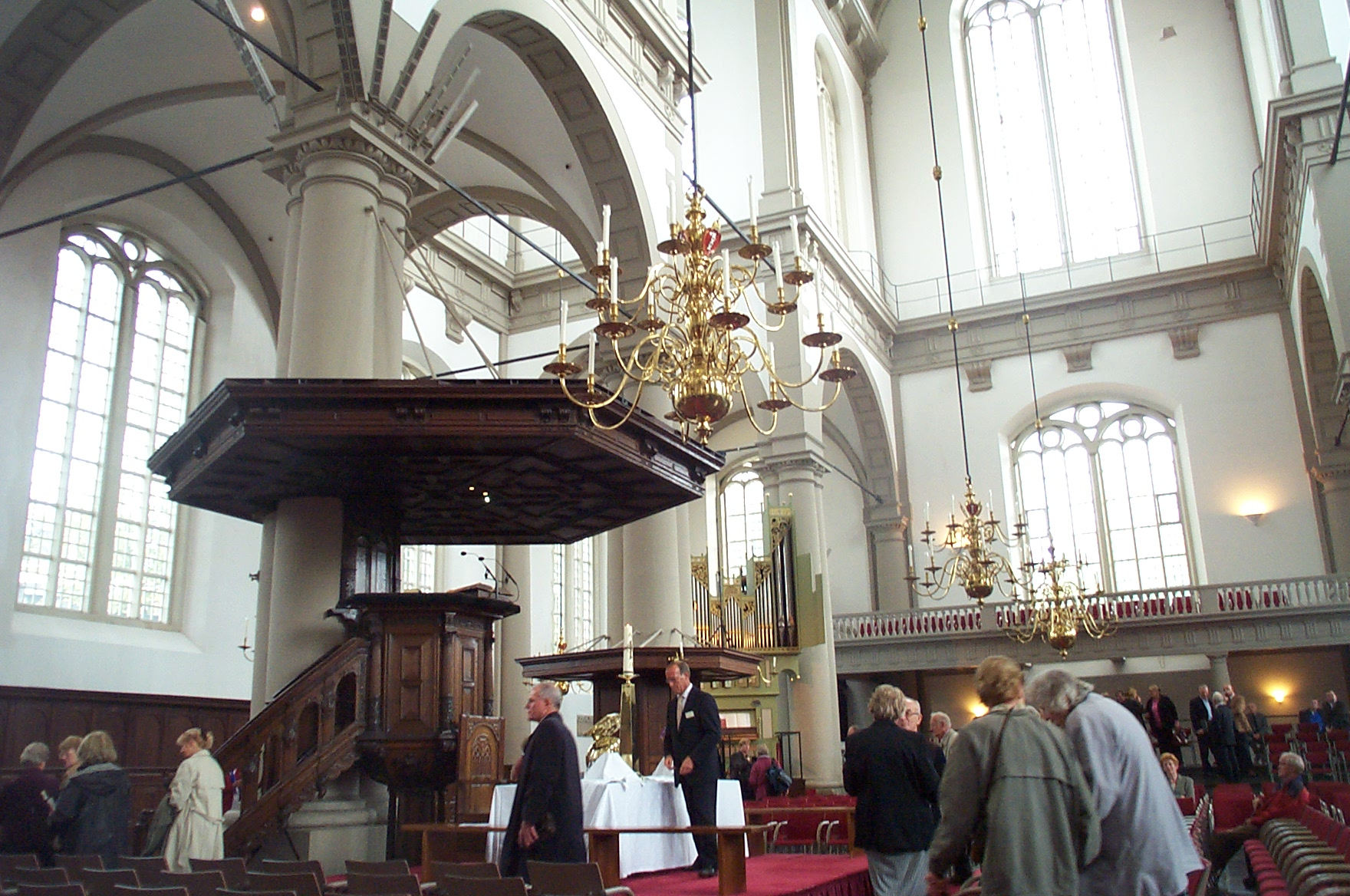
Westerkerk in Amsterdam

The doctrine of the Protestant Church in the Netherlands is expressed in its creeds. In addition to holding the Apostles', the Nicene, and the Athanasian creeds of the universal Church, it also holds to the confessions of its predecessor bodies. From the Lutheran tradition are the unaltered Augsburg Confession and Luther's Catechism, and from the Calvinist tradition are the Heidelberg and Genevan Catechisms along with the Belgic Confession with the Canons of Dordt. The Church also acknowledges the Theological Declaration of Barmen and the Leuenberg Agreement.

The PKN contains both liberal and conservative movements, although the liberal Remonstrants left talks when they could not agree with the unaltered adoption of the Canons of Dordt. Local congregations have far-reaching powers concerning "controversial" matters (such as admittance to holy communion or whether women are admitted as members of the congregation's consistory).

=== Marriage ===
A 2004 resolution allows local churches to decide about blessings of same-sex marriage.

== Organization ==
The polity of the Protestant Church in the Netherlands is a hybrid of presbyterian and congregationalist church governance. Church governance is organised along local, regional, and national lines. At the local level is the congregation. An individual congregation is led by a church council made of the minister along with elders and deacons elected by the congregation. At the regional level were 75 classical assemblies whose members are chosen by the church councils. As of May 1, 2018, these 75 classical assemblies are reorganized into 11 larger ones. At the national level is the General Synod which directs areas of common interest, such as theological education, ministry training and ecumenical cooperation.

The PKN has four different types of congregations:

1. Protestant congregations: local congregations from different church bodies that have merged
2. Dutch Reformed congregations
3. Reformed congregations (congregations of the former Reformed Churches in the Netherlands)
4. Lutheran congregations (congregations of the former Evangelical-Lutheran Church)

Lutherans are a minority (about 1 percent) of the PKN's membership. To ensure that Lutherans are represented in the church, the Lutheran congregations have their own synod. The Lutheran Synod also has representatives in the General Synod. Since June 2024 Trijnie Bouw has been the president of the synod of Protestant Church in the Netherlands

== Statistical details ==
The Protestant Church in the Netherlands issues yearly reports regarding its membership and finances.

Its make-up by former affiliation of its congregations was as follows in 2017:

Members of the Protestant Church in the Netherlands by type of congregation (2017)
Former affiliation of the congregation	% of members in the Protestant Church in the Netherlands
no former affiliation, merged, or simply identifying as Protestant (Protestants)	57.3
former Dutch Reformed Church (Hervormd)	33.6
former Reformed Churches in the Netherlands (Gereformeerd)	8.6
former Evangelical Lutheran Church in the Kingdom of the Netherlands (Luthers)	0.5

Trend shows that since 2011 identification with former denominations has been falling in favor of simply identifying as "Protestant".

The denomination has 1,458 congregations as of 1 January 2025, down from 1,630 in 2015. There were 1,352 ministers serving in these congregations (some congregations employing more than one minister), meaning that 72% of congregations had a minister.

== Secularization ==
Secularization, or the decline in religiosity, first became noticeable after 1960 in the Protestant rural areas of Friesland and Groningen. Then, it spread to Amsterdam, Rotterdam, and the other large cities in the west. Finally, the southern Catholic areas showed religious declines. Research in 2007 concluded that 42% of the members of the PKN were non-theists. Furthermore, in the PKN and several other smaller denominations of the Netherlands, one in six clergy were either agnostic or atheist. A Dutch minister of the PKN, Klaas Hendrikse once described God as "a word for experience, for human experience" and said that Jesus may have never existed.

=== Countervailing trends ===
A countervailing trend is produced by a religious revival in the Dutch Bible Belt.

According to statistics from the Dutch government, 2024 was the first year in decades to see an increase in the number of Christians, particularly in the number of Protestants.

== Separations ==
History of the churches in the Netherlands

Only those congregations belonging to the former Reformed Churches in the Netherlands have the legal right to secede from the PKN without losing its property and church during a transition period of 10 years. Seven congregations have so far decided to form the Continued Reformed Churches in the Netherlands. Two congregations have joined one of the other smaller Calvinist churches in the Netherlands. Some minorities within congregations that joined the PKN decided to leave the church and associated themselves individually with one of the other Reformed churches.

Some congregations and members in the Dutch Reformed Church did not agree with the merger and have separated. They have organized themselves in the Restored Reformed Church. Estimations of their membership vary from 35,000 up to 70,000 people in about 120 local congregations. They disagree with the pluralism of the merged church which maintains, as they see it, contradicting Calvinist and Lutheran confessions. This group also considers same-sex marriages and female clergy unbiblical.

Chart of splits and mergers of the Dutch Reformed churches

Splits and mergers of the Dutch Reformed churches

NHK (1571)
Remonstrants (1619)
Afgescheidenen (1834)
Christian Seceded Churches (1838)	Reformed Churches under the Cross (1838)
Ledeboerians (1841)
CGK (1869)
NGK (Dolerenden) (1886)
GKN (1892)
Old Reformed Federation (1907)	GerGem (1907)	Boone Con. (1907)
GKHV (1926)
GKv (1944)
NHK (1946)
OGGN (1948)
GGiN (1953)
NGK (1967)
GGiN (unconnected) (1980)
DGK (2003)
HHK (2004)	VGKN (2004)
ELKKN
PKN (2004)
GKN (2009)
NGK (2023)
GK (2024)

== Involvement in the Middle East ==
In a meeting of eight Jewish and eight Protestant Dutch leaders in Israel in May 2011, a statement of cooperation was issued, indicating, for the most part, that the Protestant Church recognizes the issues involved with the Palestinian Christians and that this is sometimes at odds with support for the State of Israel, but standing up for the rights of the Palestinians does not detract from the emphasis on the safety of the State of Israel and vice versa.

== See also ==
- Bible Belt (Netherlands)
- History of religion in the Netherlands
- United and uniting churches
- Religion in the Netherlands
- Reformed Association in the Protestant Church in the Netherlands
- Catholic Church in the Netherlands
