= 2023 in religion =

This is a timeline of events during the year 2023 which relate to religion.

== Events ==
- 5 January – The funeral of pope emeritus Benedict XVI takes place following his death on 31 December 2022.
- 24 January – The Indonesian pan-Islamist group Khilafatul Muslimin is outlawed and its leadership is sentenced to prison.
- 30 January – A suicide bombing is carried out in a mosque in Peshawar, Pakistan, killing 84 people.
- 8 February – A Christian revival begins at Asbury University in Wilmore, Kentucky.
- 16 February – The Abrahamic Family House, an interfaith complex containing a church, a mosque, and a synagogue, is inaugurated in Abu Dhabi.
- 1 May – The Netherlands Reformed Churches and the Reformed Churches in the Netherlands (Liberated) merge as the Dutch Reformed Churches.
- 9 May – A Tunisian national guardsman attacks the El Ghriba Synagogue, killing five people.
- 31 July – Riots between Hindus and Muslims break out in Haryana, India.
- 1–6 August – The Catholic World Youth Day 2023 festival is held in Lisbon.
- 31 August – Pope Francis makes a visit to Mongolia, becoming the first pope to do so.
- 4 October – Laudate Deum, an apostolic exhortation, is released by Pope Francis to call for action on climate change.
- 4 October – The French government bans Civitas an Traditionalist Catholic, integrist association and political party.
- 7 October – Palestinian militants affiliated with Hamas launch an attack on Israel. They kill approximately 1,200 people and take approximately 250 people hostage, initiating the Gaza war.
- 8 October
  - The Mor Ephrem Syriac Orthodox Church opens in Turkey, becoming the first new church constructed since the republic's founding.
  - The Swaminarayan Akshardham temple opens in Robbinsville, New Jersey, making it the largest Hindu temple outside of India.
- 14 October – A six-year-old Palestinian–American boy is stabbed to death in his home in Plainfield Township, Illinois, in response to the 7 October attack on Israel.
- 27 October – Israel launches a ground invasion of Palestine in response to the 7 October attack, killing thousands of Palestinians.
- 28–29 October – Riots targeting Jews break out in the North Caucasus region of Russia.
- 18 December – The Fiducia supplicans is declared, allowing for the blessing of same-sex couples in the Catholic Church.

== See also ==
- 2023 in Vatican City
- Antisemitism during the Gaza war
- Islamophobia during the Gaza war
- Religion and the Russian invasion of Ukraine
- Timeline of the Gaza war
