= Gereformeerde Kerken =

Gereformeerde Kerken (Dutch: "Reformed Churches") may refer to:

- Reformed Churches in the Netherlands, a denomination which existed from 1892 to 2004
- Reformed Churches (Netherlands), a denomination formed in 2024
