= Willem van 't Spijker =

Dutch theologian (1926–2021)

- Born: 21 September 1926; Zwolle
- Died: 23 July 2021 (aged 94)
- Education: Theological University of Apeldoorn
- Occupations: Theologian, historian, scientist
- Religion: Christian Reformed Churches

Willem van 't Spijker (21 September 1926 – 23 July 2021) was a Dutch minister and theologian. He was specialized in church history and church law.

== Life ==
Willem van 't Spijker was born and grew up in Zwolle in a simple family characterized by sincere piety. He married the daughter of Professor Hovius, and studied theology in Apeldoorn. Van 't Spijker graduated from the Vrije Universiteit Amsterdam in 1970 with a dissertation titled "The offices of Martin Bucer". After working as a minister at Drogeham and Utrecht, he became a professor at the Theological University of Apeldoorn of the Christian Reformed Churches. In 1997 he took leave as a professor and as succeeded by Herman Selderhuis. In his academic education and his publications, he specialized in the Reformation period.

He was appointed Knight of the Order of the Dutch Lion; he received this distinction in particular because of his many publications in the field of ecclesiastical and scientific studies. He also received an honorary doctorate in theology from the University of Christian Higher Education in Potchefstroom.
