= Oosterkerk, Groningen =

Oosterkerk
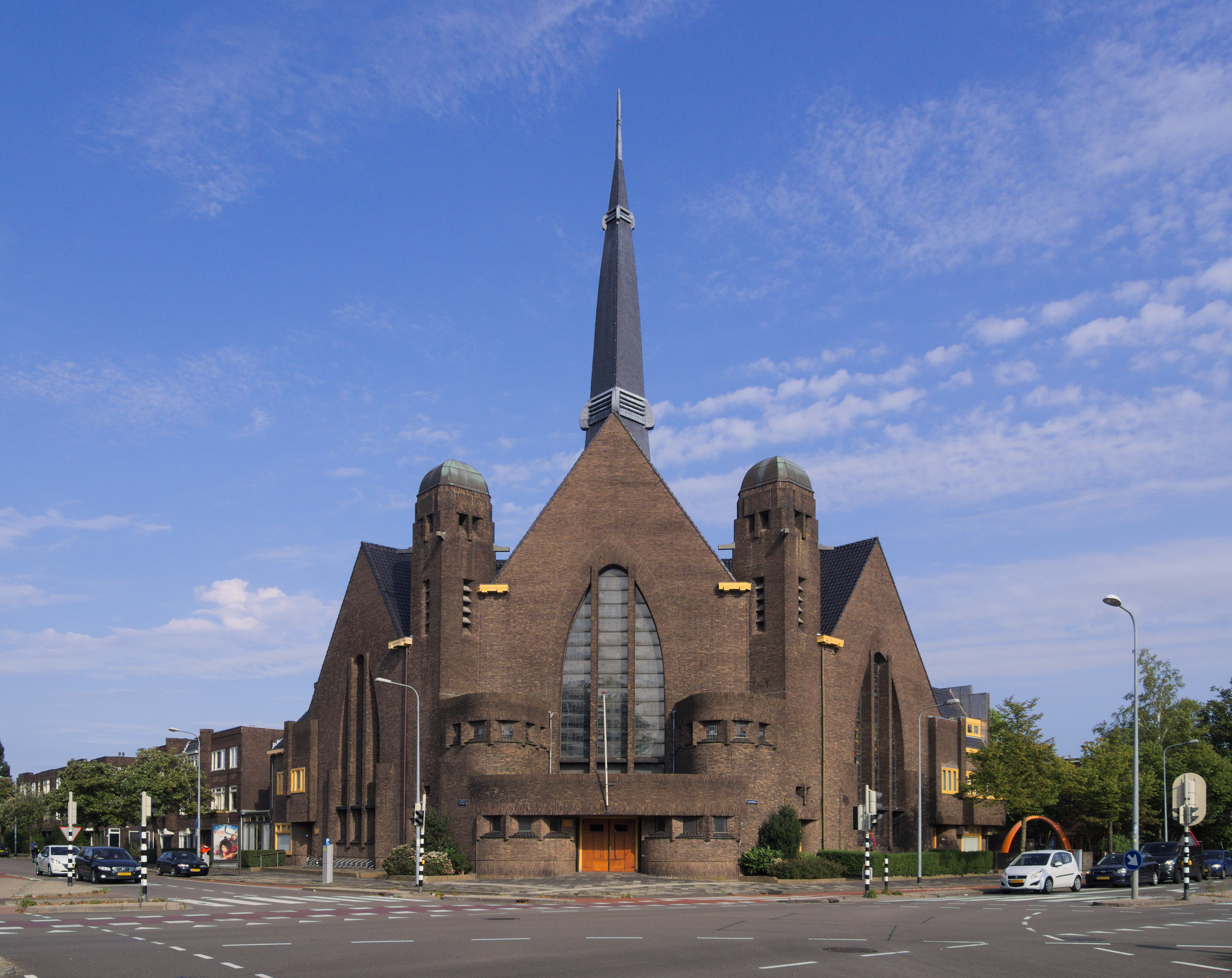
- Oosterkerk
- Oosterkerk
- 53°13′36″N 6°34′21″E
- Location: E. Thomassen à Thuessinklaan 1, Groningen, Groningen
- Country: Netherlands
- Denomination: Dutch Reformed Churches
- Website: www.groningenoost.nl

History
- Status: Active

Architecture
- Heritage designation: Rijksmonument (nr. 483654)
- Architect(s): Kuiler & Drewes
- Style: Brick Expressionism, Amsterdam School
- Years built: 1927–1929

Specifications
- Capacity: 1,116

The Oosterkerk (English: Eastern Church) is a reformed church from 1929 in the Dutch city of Groningen. It is located in the Oosterparkbuurt, on the corner of the E. Thomassen à Thuessinklaan and the S.S. Rosensteinlaan.

== Description ==
The church is a recognized rijksmonument, designed by the Groningen architects Jan Kuiler and Lucas Drewes. They built the Noorderkerk in 1920 as well, also in Groningen. The duo designed an expressionist building, inspired by the style of the Amsterdam School.

The church has a polygonal (fan-shaped) floor plan, with the main entrance facing the corner of the S.S. Rosensteinlaan and the E. Thomassen à Thuessinklaan, on the edge of the Oosterparkwijk. The sexton's house is located on the E. Thomassen à Thuessinklaan and the parsonage on the S.S. Rosensteinlaan.

There are 1,116 seats, of which 780 are downstairs and 336 on the galleries. The organ was installed in 1929 by the organ builders Valckx & Van Kouteren, modified several times in the meantime, and restored in 2008 by Mense Ruiter. The stained glass windows were restored in 1990.

The church has been used for reformed church services since 1929. Between 1999 and 2002, the building was shared by the Reformed Church and the Reformed Church (liberated). Since 2002, it has been used only by the latter denomination, which merged into the Dutch Reformed Churches in 2023. The church is also used by a community of Eritrean refugees since 2017. A congregation of the Eritrean Orthodox Church gathers in the church three Saturdays a month.

In the 1980s, the church was also used as a rehearsal space by the Northern Philharmonic Orchestra.

== Gallery ==
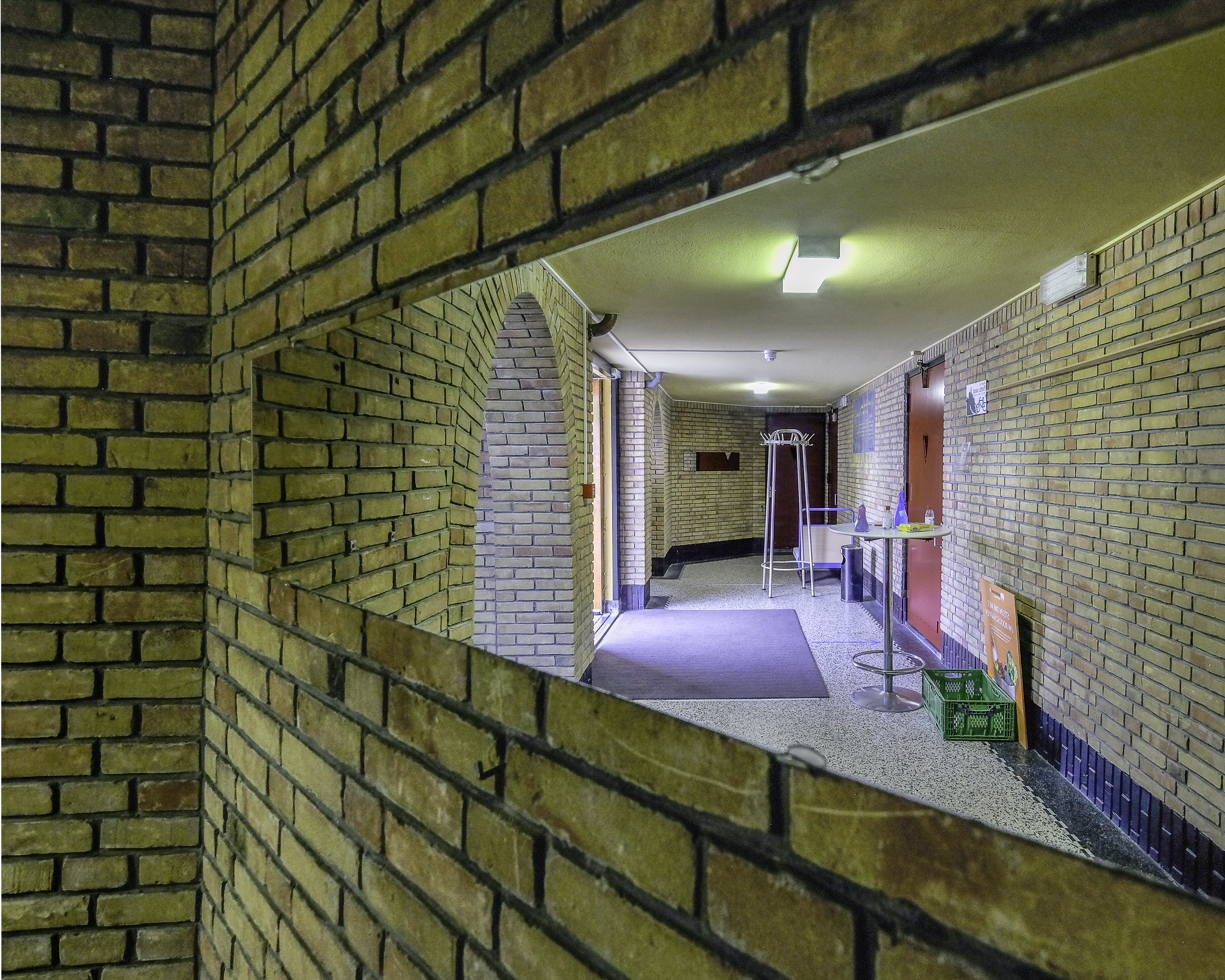
Vestibule

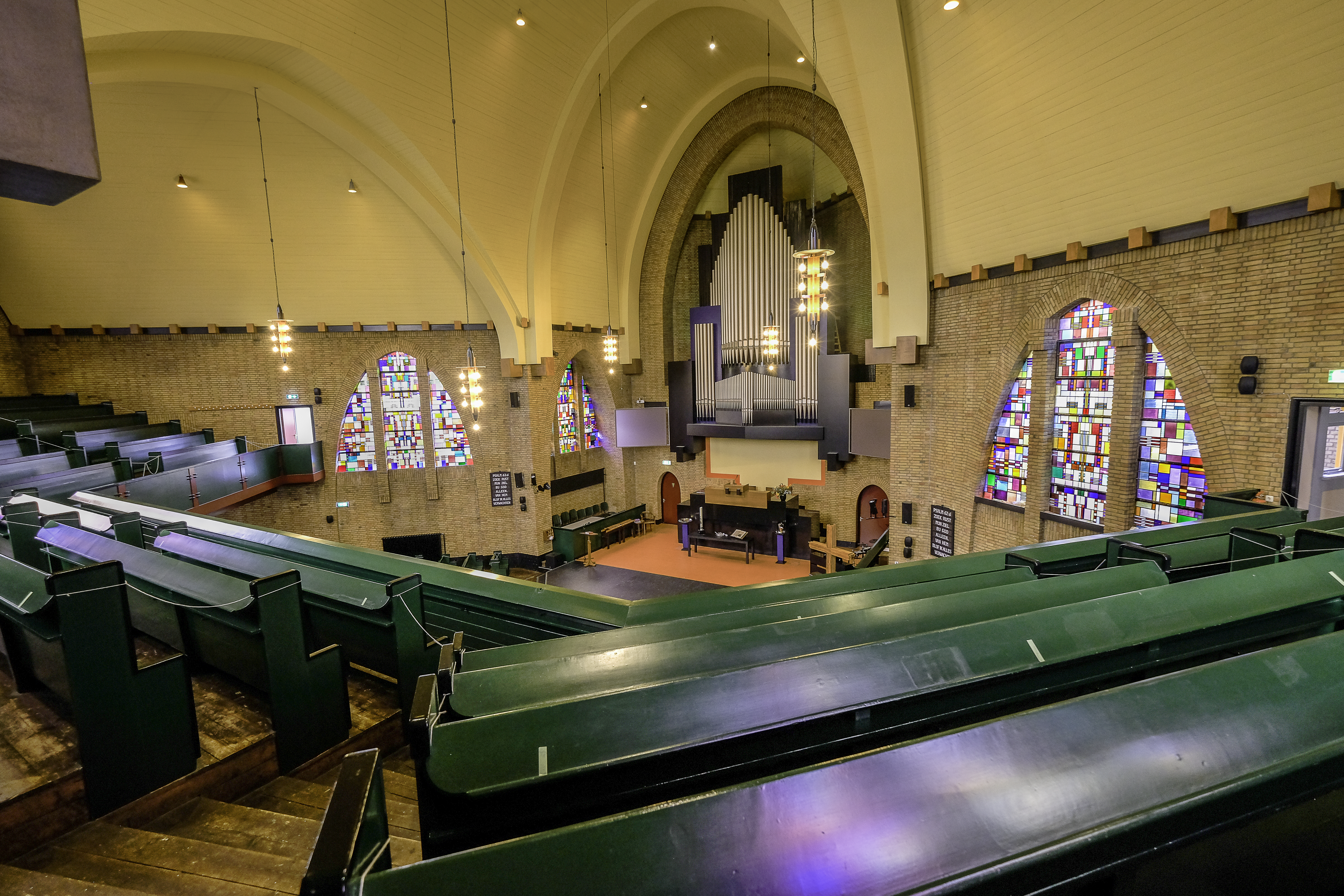
Interior

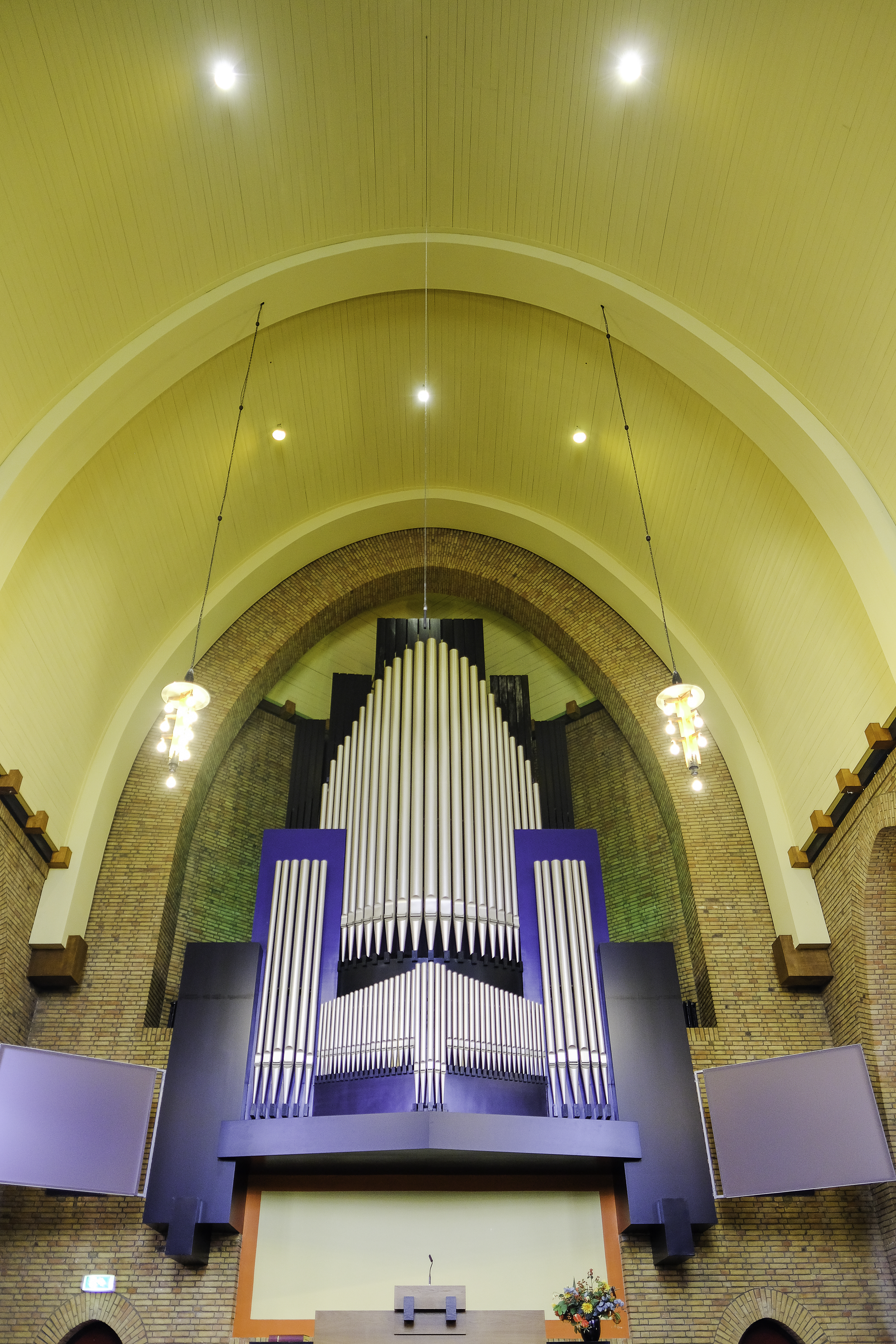
Organ

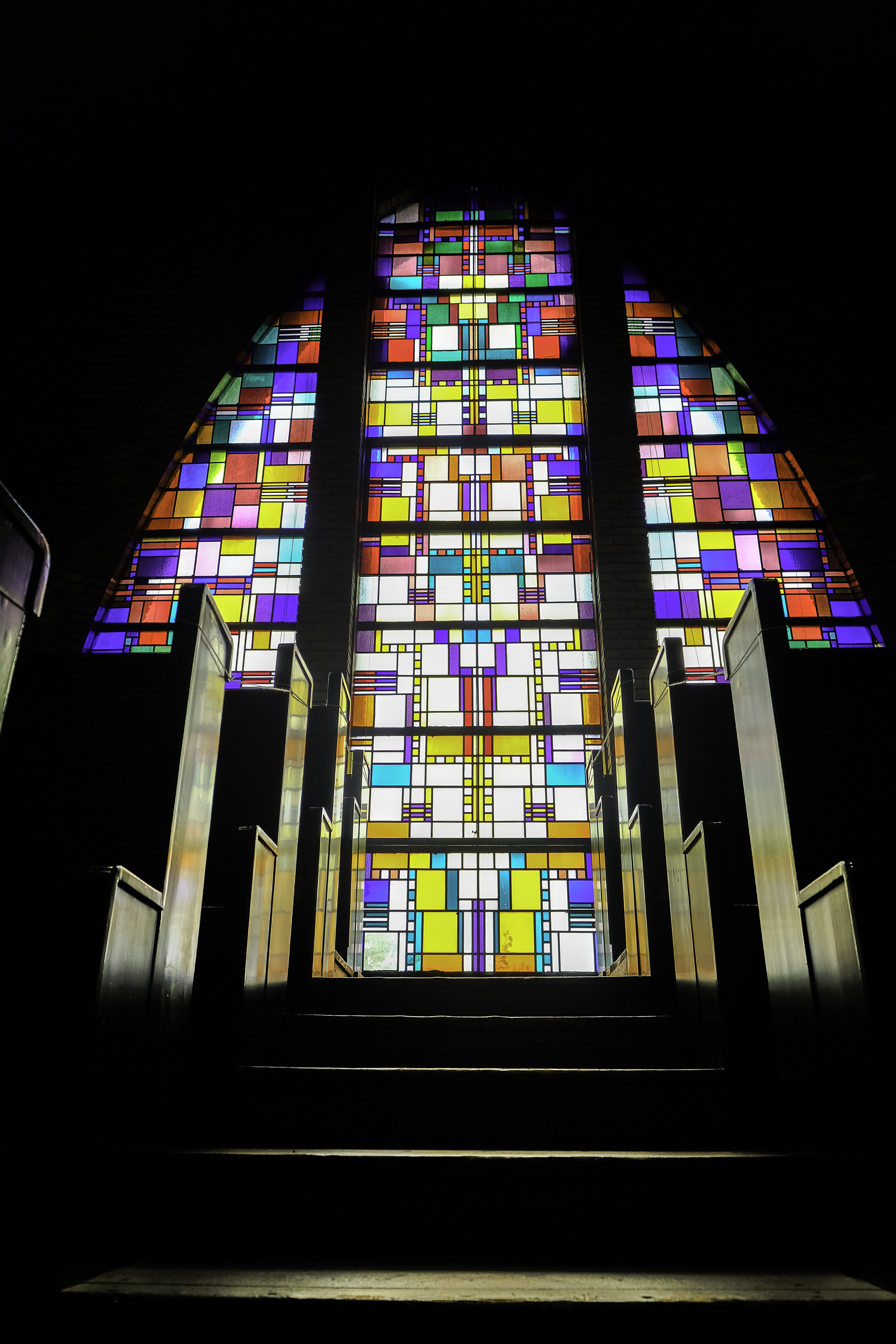
Stained glass
