= Arnold Huijgen =

Dutch theologian

professor doctor Arnold Huijgen
- Born: 16 November 1978 (age 47); Amersfoort
- Education: Theological University of Apeldoorn
- Occupation: Theologian
- Religion: Christian
- Theological work
- Tradition or movement: Christian Reformed Churches

Arnold Huijgen (born 16 November 1978) is a Dutch theologian and professor of dogmatic theology at the Protestant Theological University in Amsterdam. He was previously professor of systematic theology at the Theological University of Apeldoorn.

== Life ==
He studied theology at the Theological University of Apeldoorn from 1997 to 2004. In 2011 he graduated at this university on the dissertation Divine Accommodation in John Calvin's Theology. Analysis and Assessment . It concerns a study of the accommodation concept of John Calvin. Accommodation means that God, according to Calvin, in His revelation adapts to the comprehension of man.

In 2004 he became an assistant in education at Theological University of Apeldoorn and in 2008 he was assigned the position of university lecturer. From June 2007 to the end of 2013 he was minister at the Christian Reformed church in Genemuiden. He was appointed in 2014 as senior lecturer, his appointment as professor of systematic theology followed in November 2016. He was appointed to as professor in dogmatics at the Protestant Theological University in Amsterdam in 2022.

== Bibliography ==
- Lezen en laten lezen. Gelovig omgaan met de Bijbel. Kokboekencentrum, Utrecht, 2019.
- Herman Selderhuis & Arnold Huijgen (eds.), Calvinus Pastor Ecclesiae. Papers of the Eleventh International Congress on Calvin Research, Reformed Historical Theology 39 (Göttingen: Vandenhoeck & Ruprecht, 2016).
- Arnold Huijgen (ed.), The Spirituality of the Heidelberg Catechism. Papers of the International Conference on the Heidelberg Catechism Held in Apeldoorn 2013, Reformed Historical Theology 24 (Göttingen: Vandenhoeck & Ruprecht, 2015).
- A. Huijgen e.a. (eds.), Handbuch Heidelberger Katechismus (Gütersloh: Güterloher Verlag, 2014).
- Divine Accommodation in John Calvin's Theology: Analysis and Assessment, Vandenhoeck & Ruprecht, Göttingen 2011.
