= Willem Hendrik Velema =

Dutch theologian

Willem Hendrik Velema (November 15, 1929 – April 18, 2019) was a Dutch professor, pastor and theologian. He was a member of the Christian Reformed Churches.

== Life and work ==
Wim Velema was born in Drachten in 1929 as a son of the pastor Hendrik Velema (1889–1948). His brothers Jan (1917–2007) and Koen (1922–1997) were also pastors. After high school he studied theology and obtained his doctorate in 1957 at the VU University Amsterdam on the dissertation The Holy Spirit with Abraham Kuyper. He started his career as a pastor in Eindhoven and then he worked in Leiden. In 1966 Velema was appointed professor of New Testament courses. He did this until Johannes Pieter Versteeg was appointed Professor of New Testament in 1969. In 1969 he succeeded Willem Kremer as professor of practical theology and became also professor of civil service courses and ethics at the Theological University Apeldoorn in 1966. In 1996 he retired. In addition to his position as a professor, he was involved as a board member in various religious and social organizations. Velema was a panel member of the EO radio program Deze Week from 1980 to 1990.

Velema died in 2019 at the age of 89. His farewell speech as professor is devoted to the task of apologetics * in contemporary theology *. Well-known works by Velema include How Christian is Christian Ethics? (1983); Ethical questions in preaching and pastorate (1989) and The task of apologetics in contemporary theology (1996). A biblically based viewpoint is continuously found in Velema's work and his works have also exerted influence in South Africa.

== Publications ==
- (1968). Nieuwe wegen oude sporen. Apeldoorn: Uitgeverij Semper Agendo BV.
- (1969). Herleving van de natuurlijke ethiek tegen de achtergrond van de secularisatie. Kampen: Uitgeverij J.H. Kok.
- (1975). Bezinning op bevrijding in de oecumene: referaten gehouden op de informatiedag van 3 mei 1975 te Putten. Amsterdam: Buijten & Schipperheijn.
- (1978). Solidariteit en antithese. Een theologische peiling. Kampen: Uitgeverij J.H. Kok.
- (1987). Wet en evangelie. Kampen: Uitgeverij J.H. Kok.
- (1992). Beknopte Gereformeerde dogmatiek (met J. van Genderen). Kampen: Uitgeverij J.H. Kok.
- Met verstand en hart, De Banier
