= Netherlands Reformed Church =

The Netherlands Reformed Church may refer to three distinct Christian denominations:

- Dutch Reformed Church
- Netherlands Reformed Churches
- Netherlands Reformed Congregations
