= CGK =

CGK may refer to:

- Soekarno–Hatta International Airport, IATA airport code CGK
- Christian Reformed Churches (Dutch: Christelijke Gereformeerde Kerken)
- Cinematographers Guild of Korea, see Cinematographer#Societies and trade organizations
