= Oosterkerk =

Oosterkerk may refer to:

- Oosterkerk, Amsterdam, a 17th-century Dutch Reformed church
- Oosterkerk, Groningen, a 20th-century Dutch Reformed church
- Oosterkerk, Hoorn, 17th-century former Dutch Reformed church

== See also ==
- East Church
