= East Church =

East Church may refer to:

- East Church, Inverness, a parish church in the Church of Scotland
- East Church, Aberdeen, rebuilt as the Kirk of St Nicholas, in Scotland

== See also ==
- Eastchurch, a village in Kent, England
- Oosterkerk
- Eastern Christianity, collective term for the Christian traditions and churches which developed in the Balkans, Eastern Europe, Asia Minor, the Middle East, Northeastern Africa and southern India over several centuries of religious antiquity
- Church of the East (disambiguation)
