= Nestorian (disambiguation) =

Nestorian relates to Nestorianism, a Christological doctrine developed by Nestorius, leading to the Nestorian controversy and Nestorian Schism; it was condemned as heresy by the Council of Ephesus in 431.

"Nestorian" or "Nestorians" may also refer to:

- Church of the East, originally the church in the Sassanid Empire, which once accepted the Nestorian doctrine and split off from orthodoxy at the Nestorian Schism
  - Assyrian Church of the East
  - Ancient Church of the East
- "Nestorian" script or East Syriac Maḏnḥāyā, a form of the Syriac alphabet
- "Nestorian" Stele in China

== See also ==
- The Nestorian controversy, part of the Christological controversies of the 4th and 5th centuries
- Church of the East (disambiguation), any of several Churches that historically go back to the original Church of the East but developed doctrinal differences
