= Pieter Bustijn =

Dutch composer and organist (1649–1729)

Pieter Bustijn (Dutch pronunciation: [ˈpitər ˈbʏstɛin]; also Pierre Bustyn or Pieter Buystijn [ˈpitər ˈbœystɛin]; baptized in 1649 – 22 November 1729) was a Dutch composer, organist, harpsichordist and carillon player of the Baroque period.

Bustijn occupies a very minor place in music literature: only one of his works, in fact, has been discovered, the IX Suittes pour le Clavessin. This work, one opus number, was printed in Amsterdam in 1712 by the famous publisher Estienne Roger.

The reason for the lack of biographical details about Bustijn's life and music can be attributed to the loss of the greater part of the Middelburg archives in 1940.

== Family ==
The historian Mattheus Smallegange (1624–1710) in his Beschryving van den Zeelandschen Adel wrote that Bustijn was a member of a family which came from Liège, Belgium even if there is not definitive proof that Pieter Bustijn was a descendant of this family.

== Duties ==
Pieter Bustijn assumed the role of organist and carillonneur in 1681, at the Nieuwe Kerk of Middelburg, after the death of Remigius Schrijver (possibly his teacher).

== IX Suittes pour le Clavessin ==
The IX Suittes pour le Clavessin occupy a unique position in Dutch music history. Little music composed in the Netherlands in the late 17th and the early 18th century was in fact printed and therefore many of these works have been lost in the course of time. Bustijn's suites offer us an amazing look at Dutch musical life during the Baroque period and they are of great importance to the history of keyboard music in the Netherlands. Even Bach had a copy of Bustijn's work.

The printed edition of the Suites was very well known in the first half of the 18th century, enough to be cited in some catalogs as "The Hague" (1759). Even in an anthology of keyboard music, compiled by none other than Johann Gottfried Walther (1684–1748), appeared the name of Bustijn alongside names such as Buxtehude, J.L. Krebs, Bach, and the French Clérambault and Nivers.

According to the historian Albert Clement, the style of IX Suittes pour le Clavessin is placed between the works of earlier French masters and later German composers.

=== Similarity with J.S. Bach compositions ===
The beginning of the Prelude of the Suitte VI (in a minor) is most identical with the theme of Praeambulum 6 (BWV 784); the beginning of the Prelude of Suitte II (in D major) of the Dutch composer is similar to the beginning of the Fantasia BWV 787 (from Clavier-Büchlein vor Wilhelm Friedemann Bach, better known as Inventions and Sinfonias). One could hypothesize that Bustijn had some influence even on the greatest of composers of the Baroque era.

== Publications ==
- Pierre Bustyn, Exempla Musica Zelandica I, IX Suittes pour le Clavessin, Amsterdam ca. 1712 (reprinted Middelburg 1992), facsimile edition (Brussels, Royal Library Albert I, Fetis 2956 B Mus.), published by Koninklijk Zeeuwsch Genootschap der Wetenschapten.

=== Recordings ===
- Harpsichord in the Netherlands, Bob van Asperen (Sony B00000277E, 1991) – Recording of only Suitte No. 5 in g minor
- Unico Van Wassenaer & Contemporaries, Jacques Ogg (Globe #5101, 1993) – Recording of only Suitte No. 6 in a minor
- Pieter Bustijn – Suittes pour le Clavessin, Alessandro Simonetto (OnClassical OC49B, 2011, also licensed for Brilliant Classics 94187, 2011) – Recording of all nine suittes
- Pieter Bustijn – Suittes pour le Clavessin, Steven Devine (Zefir Records ZEF9626, 2011) – Recording of all nine suittes
- Baroque Music in the Netherlands, Jörn Boysen (NMI CD1202, 2011) – Recording of Suitte No. 2 in D major & Suitte No. 6 in a minor
