= Willem Kremer =

Dutch theologian

Willem Kremer (March 1, 1896 – August 9, 1985) was a Dutch pastor of the Christian Reformed Churches and a professor of practical theology at the Theological University of Apeldoorn.

== Life and work ==
Willem Kremer was born in Zwolle. His father, Gerrit Kremer, worked as a gardener and inspired him to pursue gardening. After the completion of his studies, he worked in greenhouses in Wassenaar, where he contracted the Spanish flu. During his illness, he discovered a passion for religion. In 1926, he completed his studies of theology in Apeldoorn and became a Christian Reformed minister in Kornhorn. In Kornhorn he was confirmed by his mentor professor Jacob Jan van der Schuit. Prior to his confirmation, he married Aaltje Scholing, with whom he had seven daughters. From 1932 to 1946 he worked in Leeuwarden, and from 1946 to 1953 he was a pastor in Apeldoorn. During his time as a pastor in Apeldoorn, he was overworked. In 1953 he was appointed professor at the Theological School of Apeldoorn. The synod entrusted him with the following subjects: New Testament exegesis, ethics and all official subjects (practical theology). He served as chairman at a number of important General Synods of the Christian Reformed Churches in 1941, 1947 and 1953. He was also editor-in-chief of the official publication of the Christian Reformed Churches, called "De Wekker". Kremer was the best person to attempt to keep together the Christian Reformed Churches, which in the period after the Second World War threatened to divide into two flanks. He did this by making all kinds of things discussable and by weighing up the different visions in the brochure: "Tensions and dangers in the lives of our Christian Reformed Churches" (1953). He also gave an impetus to what preaching should be in the Christian Reformed Churches.

In 1966 he was succeeded by Willem Velema for teaching New Testament subjects. He continued to teach the official subjects (practical theology) until January 1969. In that year Johannes Pieter Versteeg became professor of New Testament subjects and Willem Velema took over the official subjects (practical theology) from Kremer. He died on August 9, 1985, in Apeldoorn. He is buried in the cemetery in Ugchelen. At his funeral, Professor Jan van Genderen recited the confession of faith and Professor Berend Jakob Oosterhoff preached about Psalm 16.

== Theology ==
According to Kremer, the intention of his preaching is to form a bridge from the gospel to the single hearer. He calls this the spiritual element in preaching. This spiritual element is at the center of Kremer's thinking about homiletics. The spiritual element in preaching is also called 'scriptural-experimental preaching'. [a]

Kremer states that "subject (or experimental), discerning and discovering preaching" is necessary in the congregation. The congregation that meets in worship to hear the Word of God, among other things, is not a randomly composed group of people. She is the covenant church (meaning that they all receive God's promises, but that does not mean that they all embrace them in faith). Kremer links up with John Calvin, who said that there are 'two' children of the covenant. Children of the covenant continue to be sinners. The call to faith and repentance must not be missing in the preaching. Kremer therefore speaks of the Adams relationship, Abraham's relationship and Christ relationship. Due to these differences in the congregation, the work of preaching must be appealing and distinctive.

In 2019, a two-part collected work by Kremer was published by Brevier Uitgeverij in Kampen, Netherlands. [b]

== Remarkable statements ==
- The preacher-exegete will find that it is not the pulpit that calls for a text, but the text calls for a pulpit.
- Listeners should be actively involved in the sermon. The sermon may not become descriptive, so the sermon becomes an arrow without a point.
- Calls for discerning preaching and compares the believer with a living plant, the unbeliever with an artificial flower and the preaching of God's promise with the sun. It is precisely when the full light of the sun shines that the difference between the living plant and the artificial flower comes out. The first grows, the second discolors.
- The true experience is not only passive, but also active: embracing faith, breaking with sin and becoming active with the Lord.
- It is not an art to put the church on its skin every Sunday, but we (ministers) have to wait for this. The Word must live in the church, then sin will give way and the church will grow.

== Publications ==
- Baptized and Therefore (1952)
- Tensions and Dangers in the lives of our Christian Reformed Churches (1953)
- Spiritual guidance in the preaching work (1954)
- Life from the Christmas fact, radio sermon (1958)
- Preaching and ethics, speech on the transfer of the rectorship (1963)
