= Nij Altoenae =

- Village
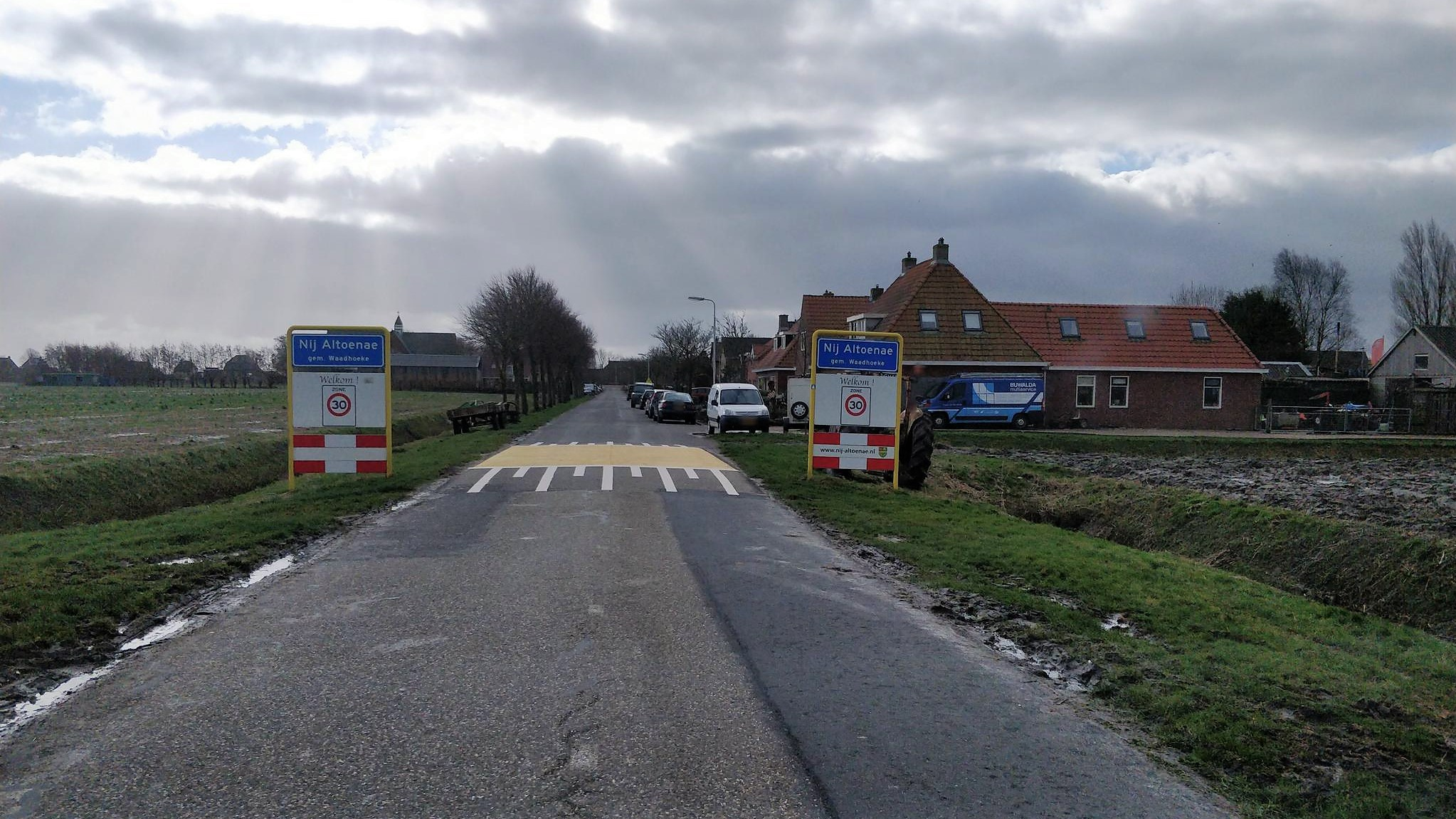
- Welcome to Nij Altoenae

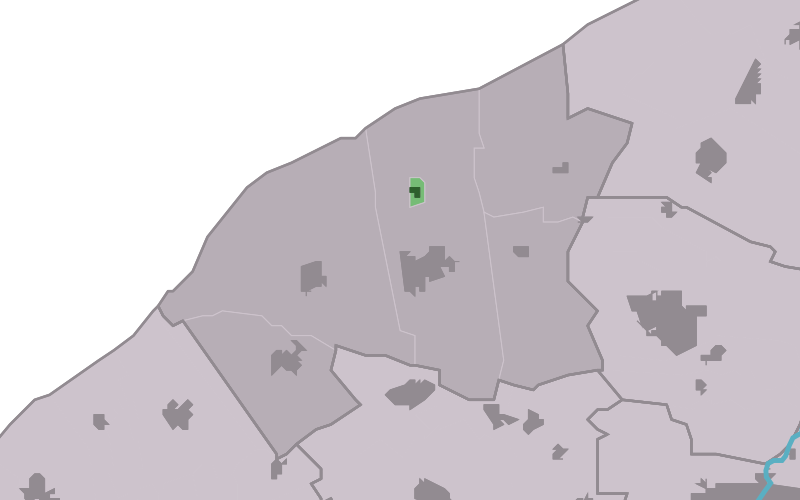
- Location in het Bildt municipality

- Location in the Netherlands Nij Altoenae (Netherlands)
- Country: Netherlands
- Province: Friesland
- Municipality: Waadhoeke

Area
  - Total: 0.17 km^{2} (0.066 sq mi)
- Elevation: 1.4 m (4.6 ft)

Population (2021)
  - Total: 325
  - Density: 1,900/km^{2} (5,000/sq mi)
- Time zone: UTC+1 (CET)
  - Summer (DST): UTC+2 (CEST)
- Postal code: 9072
- Dialing code: 0518
- Website: www.nij-altoenae.nl

Nij Altoenae (Note: Name in both standard Dutch and the local Bildts dialect.) (Dutch: [nɛi ˈɑltunaː]; West Frisian: Nij Altena) is a village in Waadhoeke municipality in the province of Friesland, the Netherlands. It had a population of around 300 in January 2017.

== History ==
The village was first mentioned in 1958 as Nij-Altoenae. Nij (new) was added to distinguish between Altoenae. Altoenae was the former name of Sint Annaparochie which was named after the estate Altena near Delft, the neighbourhood where Dirk Oem van Wijngaarden, one of the first settlers, grew up. The village used to be call 't Wegje and had the status of a hamlet.

The Reformed Church was built in 1918. In 1928, a new church was built in a different location. The old church was sold, and is nowadays used as a shed. The new church was renovated in 2012.

In 2006, Nij Altoenae became a village. Until 2018, the village was part of het Bildt municipality.

== Gallery ==
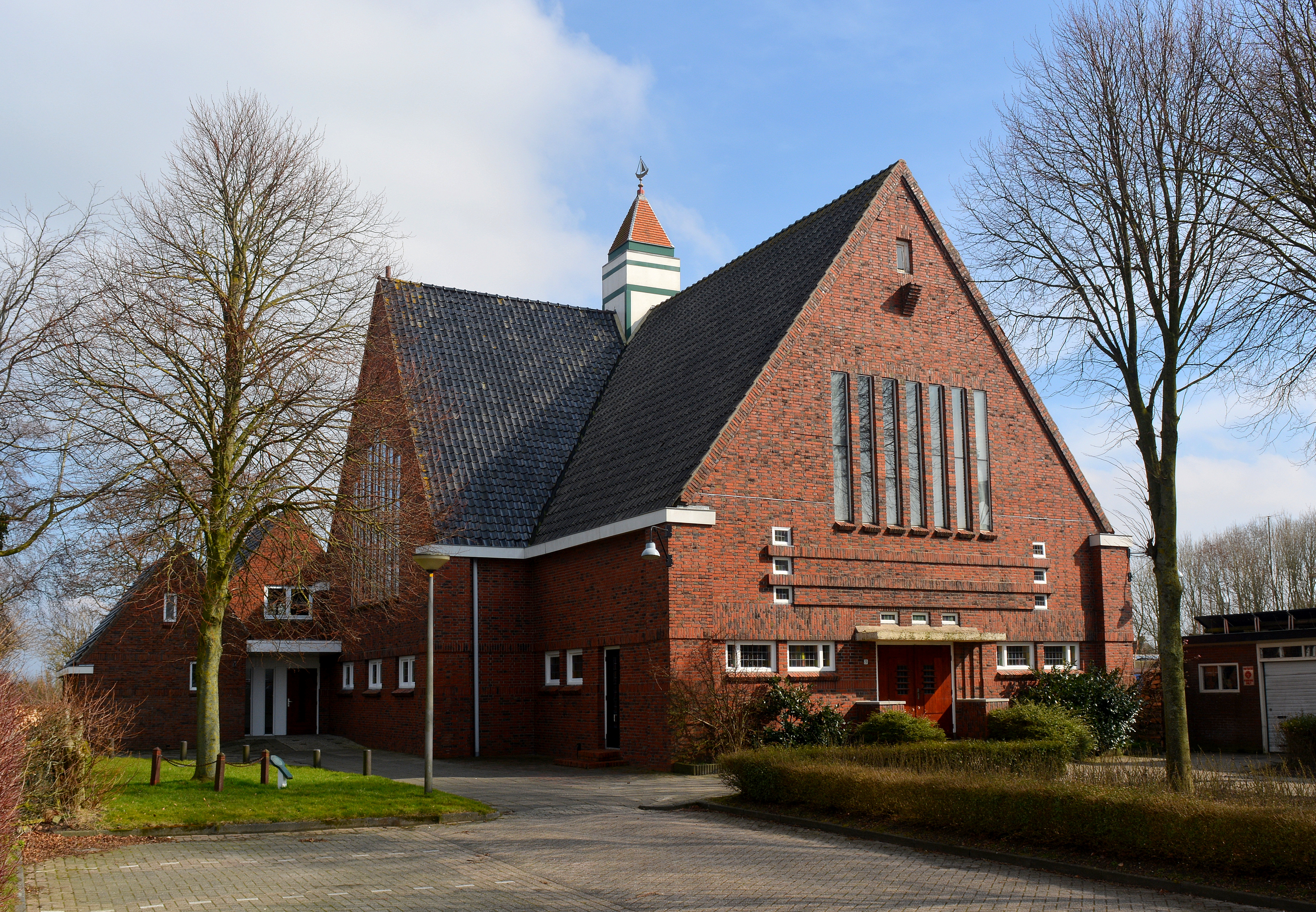
Church between the dikes
