= Korean Reformed Churches =

The Korean Reformed Churches in Korea (KRC) are a federation of eight theologically conservative Reformed churches that was founded in 2013 in Busan, South Korea.

The Korean Reformed Churches trace their theological roots back to the sixteenth-century Protestant Reformation, and especially to the Reformed churches in the Netherlands.

The Korean Reformed Churches subscribe to the Ecumenical Creeds (Apostles' Creed, Nicene Creed, Athanasian Creed), the Belgic Confession, the Heidelberg Catechism, and the Canons of Dort, as their doctrinal standards.

The church polity of the Korean Reformed Churches is based on the church order adopted by the Synod of Dort (1618–1619). Contrary to the hierarchical Presbyterian model of church government, the Korean Reformed Churches practice an anti-hierarchical church polity, as embraced in the continental Reformed model of church government.

Liturgically, the Korean Reformed Churches use both the Genevan Psalter and classical hymns that are approved for use by the federation in their worship services.

The Korean Reformed Churches also operate a theological seminary, Korean Reformed Theological Seminary, located in Busan, offering a Master of Divinity program.
