= Continued Reformed Churches in the Netherlands =

Dutch federation of churches

The Continued Reformed Churches in the Netherlands or VGKN (Dutch: Voortgezette Gereformeerde Kerken in Nederland) is a federation of churches founded on 8 May 2004, in the Netherlands.

When the Reformed Church in the Netherlands merged with the Protestant Church in the Netherlands on 1 May 2004, many churches were worried about the new church order. Their main concern was the plurality and different interpretation of the Christian faith.

== Churches ==
The federation originally consisted of seven churches:

- Boornbergum - Kortehemmen
- Den Bommel
- Frieschepalen - Siegerswoude
- Garderen
- Haarlem
- Harkema
- Noordwolde

The Reformed Church in Den Bommel was affiliated to the Protestant Church. The Haarlem Church joined the Netherlands Gereformeerde Kerken in 2005. In May 2006 a new church in Drachtstercompagnie joined the federation. In 2012 a new congregation joined the Continued Reformed Churches in Boelenslaan. The denomination currently has 5 congregations and about 1200 members (2019), the chairman is Rev. Kersten Bijleveld.
