= Evangelical Lutheran Church in the Kingdom of the Netherlands =

Former Protestant church that merged in 2003

- Synod Seal of the Lutheran Church in the Kingdom of the Netherlands (1818-2004)
- Classification: Protestant
- Orientation: Lutheran
- Scripture: Protestant Bible
- Theology: Lutheran
- Origin: 1818; Netherlands
- Separations: 2004 merged with the Dutch Reformed Church and the Reformed Churches in the Netherlands to form the Protestant Church in the Netherlands.

The Evangelical Lutheran Church in the Kingdom of the Netherlands (Dutch: Evangelisch-Lutherse Kerk in het Koninkrijk der Nederlanden) was a denomination in the Netherlands which under that name existed from 1818 to 2004. In 2004, the denomination became a part of the Protestant Church in the Netherlands, which is the continuation of the Dutch Reformed Church, the Reformed Churches in the Netherlands and the Evangelical-Lutheran Church in the Kingdom of the Netherlands.

The first Lutheran congregations in the Netherlands were founded in the 16th century, but an organized 'Evangelical Lutheran Church in the Kingdom of the Netherlands' did not come into being until 1818. The city of Amsterdam was, and still is, the centre of Dutch Lutheranism. Most Lutherans in the Netherlands are descendants of German or Scandinavian merchants, and the Lutheran church has always been quite small.

Because of the urban and internationally oriented membership of the Lutheran Church, liberal influences have always been relatively strong. The church was always counted among the most liberal denominations in the Netherlands. They were among the first churches to ordain women.

On 1 May 2004, the Lutheran Church's membership was down to a mere 14,000 (in 1970 still 48,195) when it merged with the Dutch Reformed Church and the Reformed Churches in the Netherlands to form the Protestant Church in the Netherlands.
