= Herman Selderhuis =

Dutch minister, professor and theologian (born 1961)

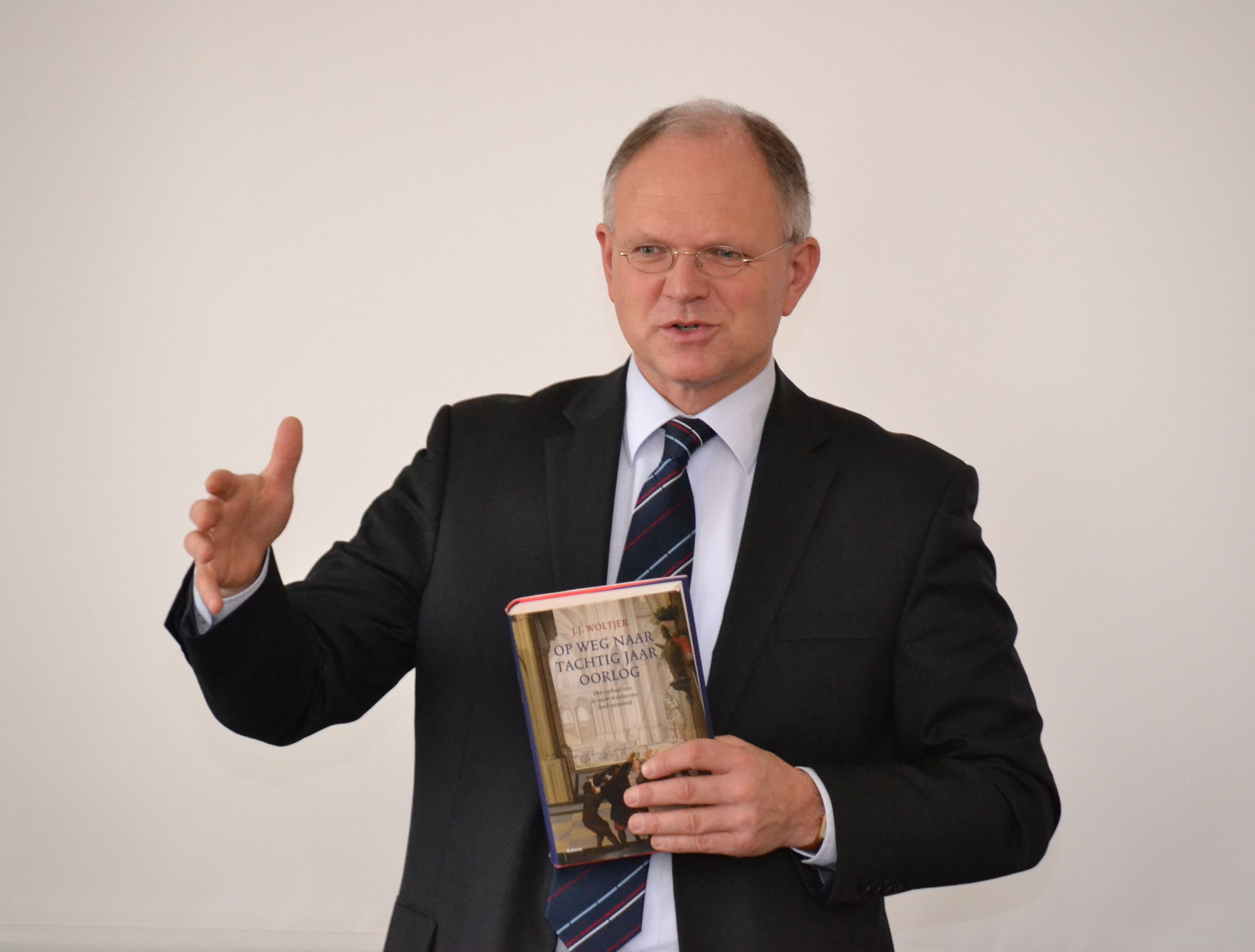
- Born: 21 May 1961 (age 65); Enschede
- Education: Theological University of Apeldoorn
- Occupations: Theologian, church historian
- Theological work
- Tradition or movement: Reformed Christianity

Herman Selderhuis (born 21 May 1961) is a Dutch minister, theologian and professor of church history and church polity.

== Life ==
Herman Johan Selderhuis was born on 21 May 1961. He grew up in a family that was not involved in the church. At the age of 15, he began attending church services and was subsequently baptized and joined the Christian Reformed Churches. He attended the grammar school at the Ichthus College in his hometown, Enschede. From 1981 to 1988 he studied theology at the Theological University of Apeldoorn of the Christian Reformed Churches. His doctoral exam was on Church History. Selderhuis was minister of the Christian Reformed Church in Hengelo from 1987 until 1992. The following five years he was minister of the Christian Reformed Church in Zwolle. He graduated in 1994 on the subject of Martin Bucer on Marriage and Divorce. In January 1997 he became Professor of Church History and Church Law as the successor to Willem van 't Spijker at the Theological University in Apeldoorn.

== Career ==
He is currently professor of church history and church polity at the Theological University of Apeldoorn. He also served as the academic curator of the John Lasco Library (Emden, Germany) from 2010 - 2017 and is president of the International Calvin Congress. He is also director of Refo500, the international platform for knowledge, expertise, ideas, products and events, specializing in the 500 year legacy of the Reformation. In November 2020 he became boardmember of the international Martin Luther foundation.

== Bibliography ==
Some of his books are:

- John Calvin: A Pilgrim's Life
- Selderhuis, Herman (2009). The Calvin Handbook. Grand Rapids: Eerdmans. ISBN 978-0-8028-6230-3.
- Marriage and Divorce in the Thought of Martin Bucer
- Handbook of Dutch Church History
- Calvin's Theology of the Psalms
- Martin Luther: A Spiritual Biography
