= Boelenslaan =

Boelenslaan Boelensloane (West Frisian)
- Village
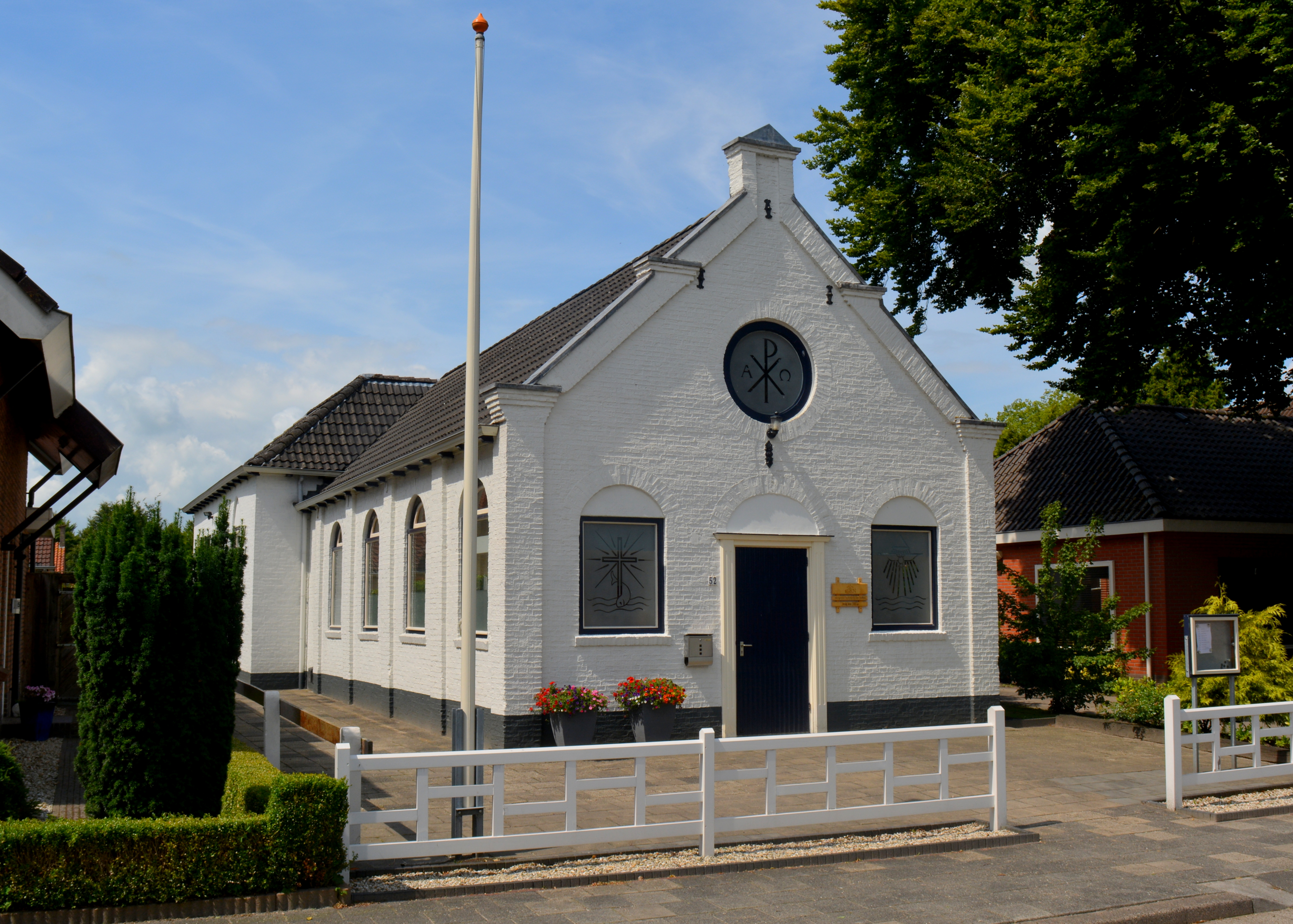
- Little white church

- Flag Coat of arms

- Location in the Netherlands Boelenslaan (Netherlands)
- Coordinates: 53°09′43″N 06°08′41″E
- Country: Netherlands
- Province: Friesland
- Municipality: Achtkarspelen

Area
  - Total: 6.99 km^{2} (2.70 sq mi)
- Elevation: 2 m (6.6 ft)

Population (2021)
  - Total: 1,295
  - Density: 185/km^{2} (480/sq mi)
- Time zone: UTC+1 (CET)
  - Summer (DST): UTC+2 (CEST)
- Postal code: 9233
- Dialing code: 0512

Boelenslaan (West Frisian: Boelensloane) is a village in Achtkarspelen municipality in Friesland province in the northern Netherlands.

As of January 2017, Boelenslaan has 1141 inhabitants

The village is in the "Friese Wouden" in the Frisian forests.

== History ==
The village was first mentioned in 1899 as Boelenslaan, and means (dead-end) road to the settlement of the Boelens family. The Boelens family used to be grietman (mayors) who owned large parcels of land. Boelenslaan was originally a peat excavation settlement. In 1852, a church was built. The white church is a chapel of the Continued Reformed Church.

== The Flag of Boelenslaan ==
The color red refers to the heathland and the severability fight of the population, the color yellow refers to the Sandgrounds. The color green refers to Friese Wouden, from the village area. The silver rose is the coat of arms of the noble family Boelens, after whom it was named.

== Gallery ==
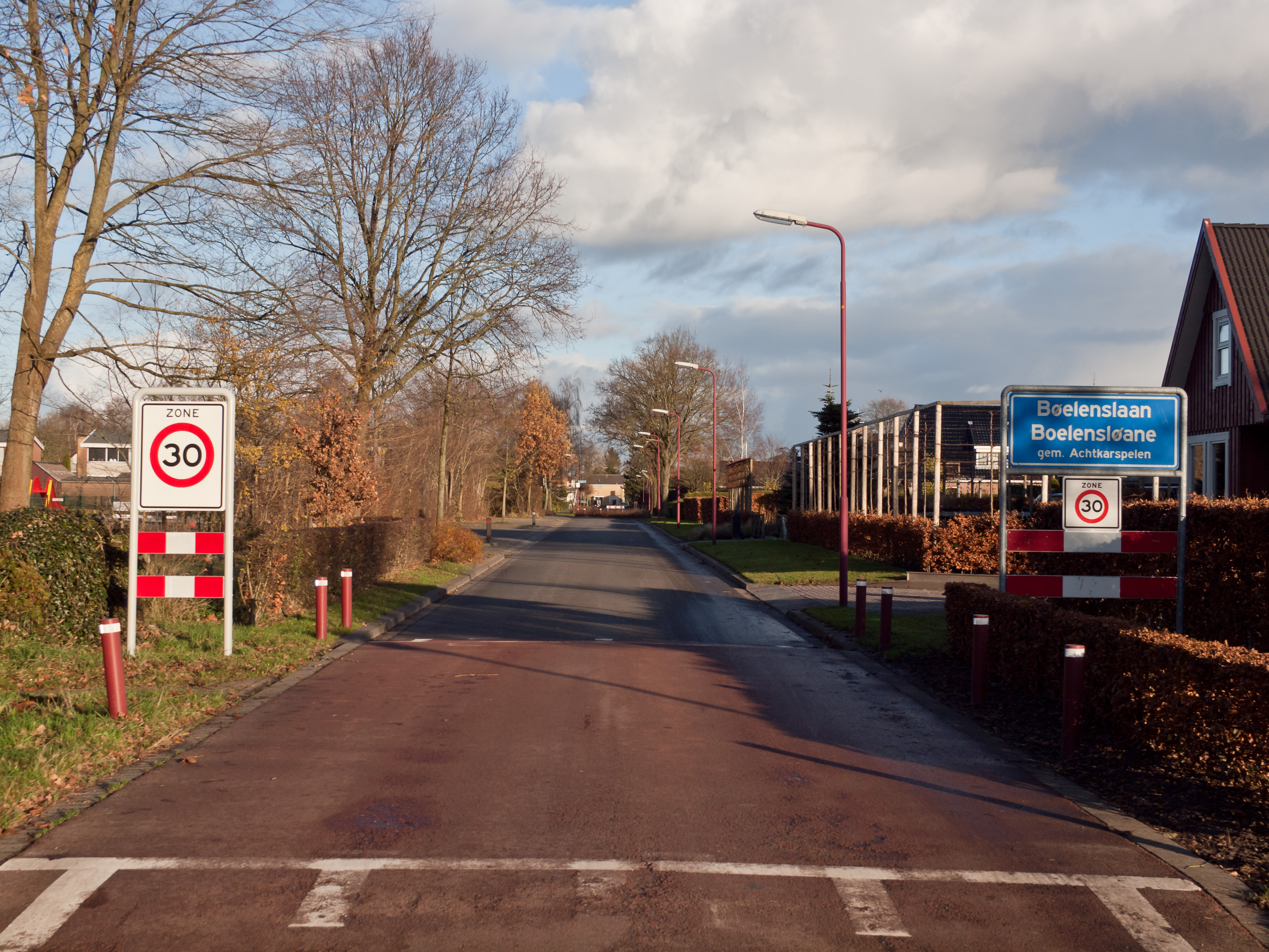
Welcome to Boelenslaan

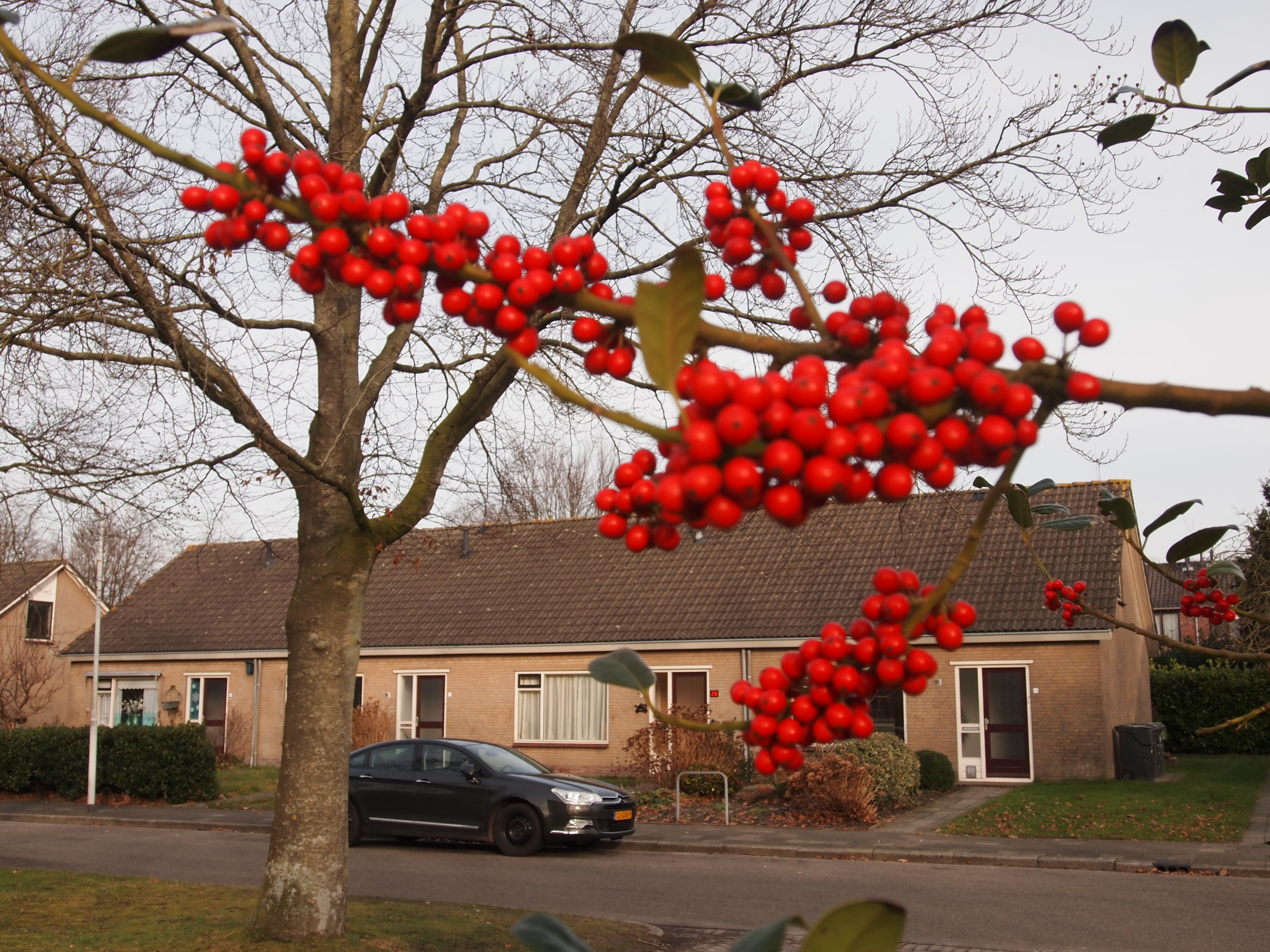
Berries

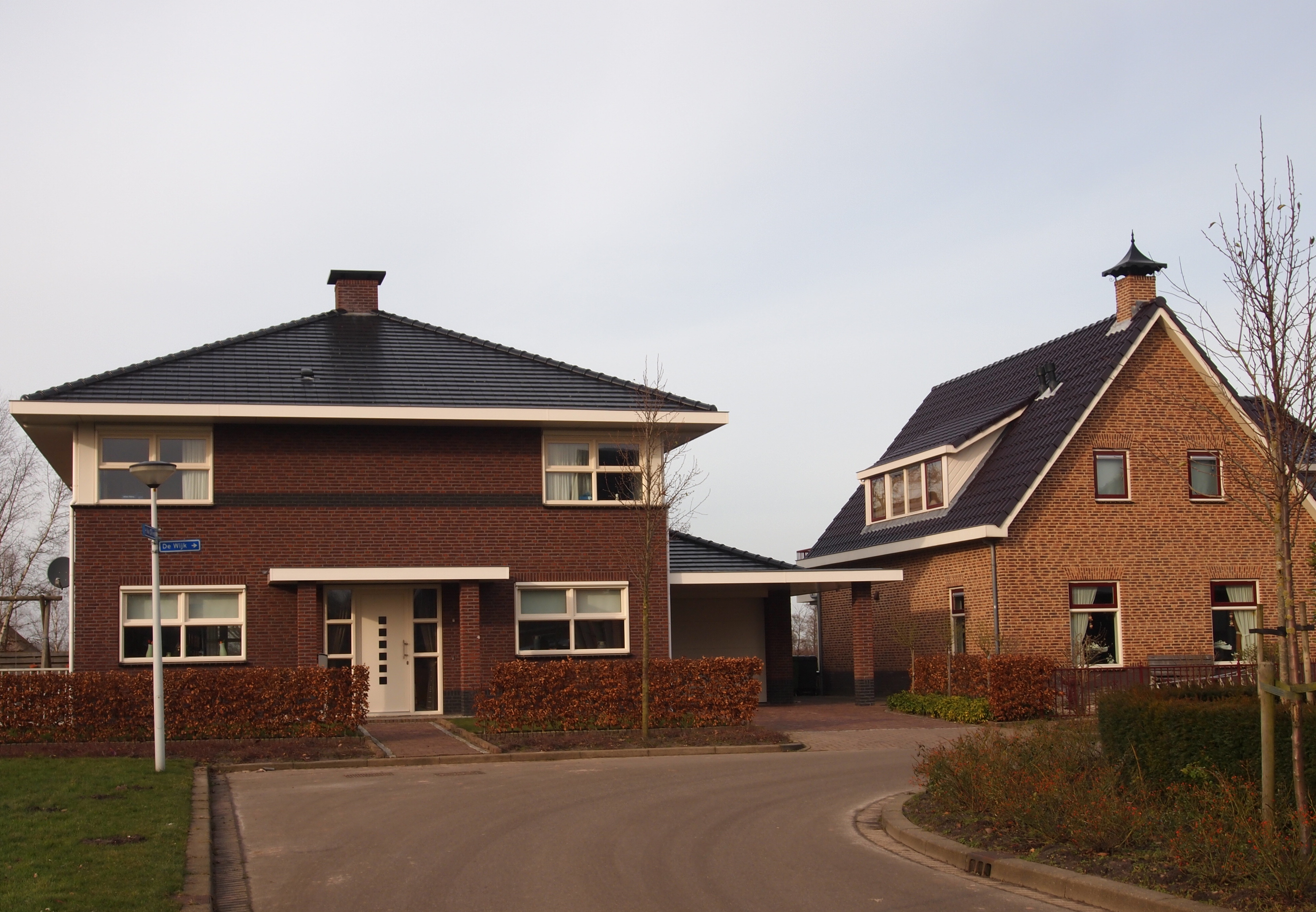
House in Boelenslaan

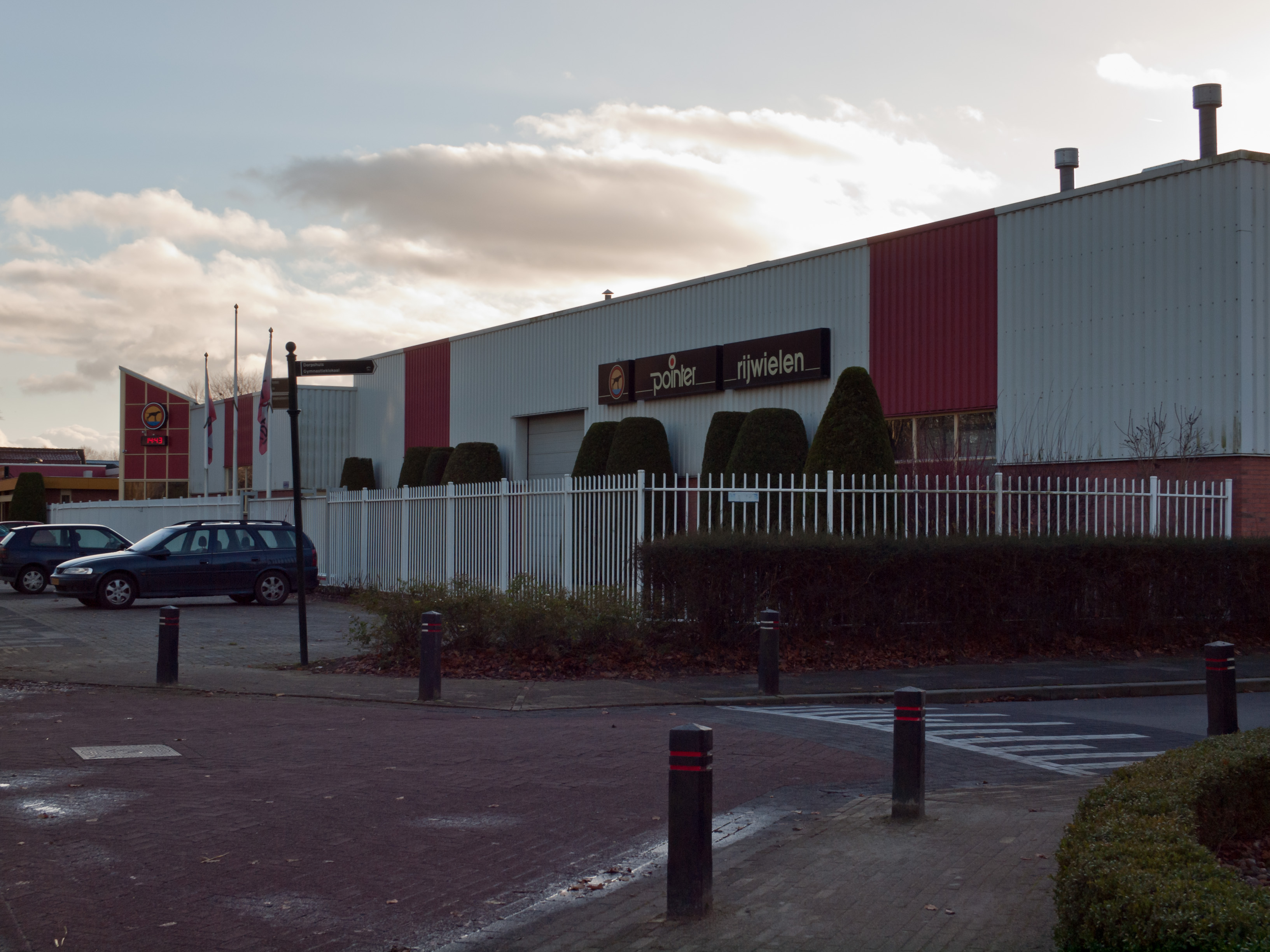
Bicycle factory
