= Albert Clement =

Dutch Musicology professor

Arie Albertus Clement (born 9 August 1962, Middelburg) is Professor of Musicology at Utrecht University and teaches at its international college University College Roosevelt, the honours college of Utrecht University in Middelburg, the Netherlands. Since September 2021, Clement is also Professor of Theology & Music at the Theological University of Apeldoorn.

Albert Clement studied Musicology at Utrecht University (M.A. Degree, 1987, with highest distinction), Organ at the Brabant Conservatory, Tilburg (Teacher's and Performer's Diplomas in Organ, 1986 and 1988 respectively), and Theology at the University of Leiden. He received his doctorate from Utrecht University's Faculty of Arts, with highest distinction (1989). In 1993 he was awarded with the Province of Zeeland's Prize for Encouragement in Arts and Sciences.

Clement has published over 300 articles and is regarded as a specialist on the works of Johann Sebastian Bach.

Since September 2021 Clement holds the new chair of Theology & Music at the Theological University of Apeldoorn while remaining affiliated with Utrecht University as Professor of Musicology. At Theological University of Apeldoorn, a Theology & Music research unit has been created, chaired by Prof. Dr. Albert Clement. Clement is involved in interdisciplinary research in the field of the relationship between theology and music.
