= Theological University of Apeldoorn =

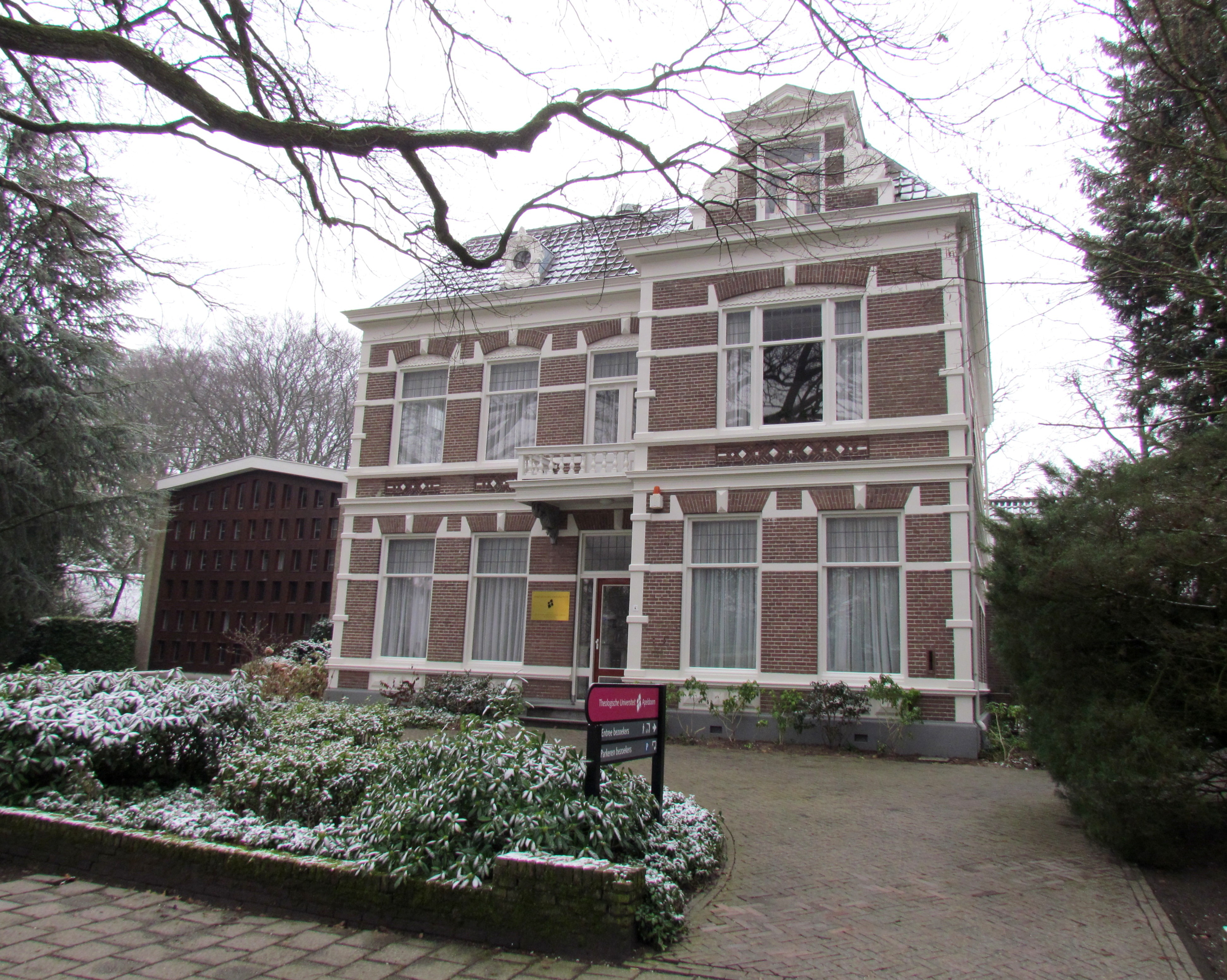
- Type: Seminary
- Established: 1894
- Location: Apeldoorn, The Netherlands; 52.2211°N 5.9643°E

The Theological University of Apeldoorn (TUA) is the Dutch theological university of the Christian Reformed Churches (Christelijke Gereformeerde Kerken). More than 130 students study at the university in Apeldoorn, Netherlands. The theological course lasts six years. The student is in the bachelor's program for the first three years. This has a more orientating character, and includes the languages Classic Greek and Koine Greek, Latin and Biblical Hebrew. In the three-year master's program that follows, further studies and specialization are discussed. The training is specifically aimed at educating pastors (for the Christian Reformed Churches). The syllabus consists of subjects such as ethics, apologetics, Old and New Testament, canonical studies, dogmatics, church history, church law and civil subjects.

Although the university is mainly a preacher training for the Christian Reformed Churches, a minority of them become preachers or preachers within this church federation. In addition to students from the Netherlands, there are also students from outside the Netherlands, especially from Korea, Indonesia and other countries in Asia. Students come from various confessional backgrounds and from various countries. National student evaluations have ranked TUA for several years as one the best Dutch universities.

There is also contact and cooperation with the Theological University of the Reformed Churches in Utrecht. By integrating their research programs, the theological universities of Apeldoorn and Utrecht are able to present a combined tradition of more than two centuries of classical theology. Their research program aims to combine two fields of research that are often kept quite separate: Biblical Exegesis and Systematic Theology (BEST).

== History ==
At the first Synod of the Christian Reformed Churches in 1894 eight congregations were represented, and they opened a theological seminary in The Hague. In 1919 the university moved to Apeldoorn.

Since 1968 the university has been open also to those who do not seek training for the ministry in the Christian Reformed Churches of the Netherlands, but who have a desire to study theology for other aims.

Since 1980 the university has been allowed to grant a doctor's degree (Th.D.) in theology. The Theological University of Apeldoorn and the Puritan Reformed Theological Seminary in Grand Rapids started a Puritan research center in 2017 and set up a combined doctoral program.

Plans to merge the TUA into a Reformed Theological University, in which the Theological University of Kampen and the ministerial training of the Netherlands Reformed Churches would also participate, came to naught when the Christian Reformed Synod rejected the formation of the Reformed Theological University in October 2017.

The master's program 'Living Reformed Theology' started in September 2021. This 60 EC master's degree can be taken part-time or fast-tracked and has an interdisciplinary design. The various theological disciplines, such as the Old Testament and Practical Theology, are brought into contact with each other.

== Notable faculty ==
- Albert Clement
- Herman Selderhuis
- Eric Peels
- Willem Kremer (1954-1969)
- Arnold Huijgen
