= Reformed Churches in the Netherlands (Restored) =

Christian denomination in the Netherlands

Reformed Churches (Restored)
- Origin: 2003; Netherlands
- Separated from: Reformed Churches in the Netherlands (Liberated)
- Merged into: Reformed Churches (2024)

The Reformed Churches (Restored) (Dutch: De Gereformeerde Kerken in Nederland (hersteld)), also known as the New Liberated Churches (Dutch: Nieuwe Vrijgemaakte Kerken) constituted a Christian denomination in the Netherlands. It separated from the Reformed Churches in the Netherlands (Liberated) in 2003. Officially named the "Reformed Churches in the Netherlands", they were usually called the "Reformed Churches (Restored)" to avoid confusion with the Reformed Churches in the Netherlands (Liberated) and the Reformed Churches in the Netherlands (GKN).

In 2003 in the GKV a group became dissatisfied, and separated from the GKV, because of the Synod decision on divorce and Sunday rest.

The Three Forms of Unity, the Belgic Confession, Canons of Dort and the Heidelberg Catechism were the official standards adopted in the First Synod meeting in 2005.

In 2022 the church had one Synod, 2 classes and 10 congregations in the Netherlands. In the Southwest Classis were congregations in Bleiswijk, Amersfoort, Dalfsen and Zwolle. In the Northeast Classis were congregations in Emmen, Groningen, Opeinde, Marienberg, Lutten and Assen.

A family magazine was being published by members of the churches (De Bazuin). The denomination published its own English magazine the Reformed Continua.

In 2024 the denomination merged with the Reformed Churches the Netherlands (Gereformeerde Kerken Nederland). The resulting denomination is called the Reformed Churches (Gereformeerde Kerken).
