= Reformed Churches (Netherlands) =

- Classification: Protestant
- Orientation: Continental Reformed
- Theology: Confessional, Conservative and Calvinist
- Polity: Presbyterian
- Associations: International Conference of Reformed Churches
- Region: Netherlands
- Origin: October 5, 2024
- Merger of: Reformed Churches in the Netherlands (Restored) and Reformed Churches in the Netherlands (2009)
- Congregations: 31 (2024)
- Members: 3,500 (2024)

The Reformed Churches (Dutch: Gereformeerde Kerken) are a conservative continental reformed denomination in the Netherlands, since 2024, from the merger of the Reformed Churches in the Netherlands (2009) and Reformed Churches in the Netherlands (Restored).

Both denominations, however, trace their origins to churches that split from the Reformed Churches in the Netherlands (Liberated) in the 2000s and 2010s.

== History ==
In 2002, the Synod of the Reformed Churches in the Netherlands (Liberated) decided that Sunday keeping was not a doctrine taken directly from the Bible, but came from a church tradition. Therefore, restrictions were imposed on church discipline regarding this commandment. Furthermore, the synod began to permit the use of a new hymnal, established ecclesiastical relations with other denominations that allow textual criticism of the Bible, changed its marriage formula.

Consequently, in 2003, a group of dissatisfied churches broke away and formed the Reformed Churches in the Netherlands (Restored) (known by its Dutch acronym, De Gereformeerde Kerken in Nederland or DGK), in an event that became known as the "new liberation" (in reference to the event known as the "liberation" that gave rise to the Reformed Churches in the Netherlands (Liberated)). The first synod of the DGK was held in 2005.

In 2009, some of the churches of the denomination separated and formed the Reformed Churches in the Netherlands (2009), in Dutch Gereformeerde Kerken Nederland or GKN.

In 2021, the DGK began negotiations on reunification with the GKN. In addition, the denomination held joint conferences with the Restored Reformed Church.

In 2024 the Reformed Churches in the Netherlands (Restored) (DGK) and the Reformed Churches in the Netherlands (2009) (GKN) decided to reunify. A joint extraordinary synod has been scheduled for October 5, 2024.

On that date, a unified synod was formed and the new denomination was formally constituted. The name chosen was Reformed Churches (in Dutch Gereformeerde Kerken).

After the merger, the denomination had 31 churches and 3,500 members.

== Doctrine ==
The denomination subscribes to the Apostles' Creed, Athanasian Creed, Nicene Creed, Belgic Confession, the Heidelberg Catechism and the Canons of Dort.

== Interchurch relations ==
In 2022, the Reformed Churches in the Netherlands (2009) were admitted as members of the International Conference of Reformed Churches. The merged denomination will continue as a member of the organization in succession to the previously member denomination.
