= Church of the East (disambiguation) =

Church of the East, also called Nestorian Church, an Eastern Christian denomination formerly spread across Asia, separated since the schism of 1552.

Church of the East may also refer to:

- Church of Assyria and Mosul, a patriarchate with historical background in the Church of the East in full communion with the Catholic Church 1553-1692
  - Assyrian Church of the East, a patriarchate that declared independence in 1692 from the Church of Assyria and Mosul
    - Ancient Church of the East, a patriarchate which separated from the Assyrian Church of the East in 1964
  - Chaldean Catholic Church, a patriarchate tracing its heritage to the Church of the East that entered into full communion with the Catholic Church as an Eastern Catholic particular church sui iuris in 1830

== See also ==
- Church of the East in India or the Saint Thomas Christians
- Church of the East in China
- Church of the East in Sichuan
- Eastern Christianity, collective term for the Christian traditions and churches which developed in the Balkans, Eastern Europe, Asia Minor, the Middle East, Northeastern Africa and southern India over several centuries of religious antiquity
