= Netherlands Reformed Churches =

Reformed Protestant Christian denomination

- Nederlands Gereformeerde Kerken
- Classification: Protestant
- Orientation: Orthodox Reformed (Neo-Calvinist)
- Polity: Presbyterian
- Origin: 1967; Netherlands
- Separated from: Reformed Churches in the Netherlands (Liberated) (Dutch Gereformeerde Kerken in Nederland (Vrijgemaakt))
- Merged into: Dutch Reformed Churches
- Congregations: 94
- Members: 33,032
- statistics as of 2011

The Netherlands Reformed Churches (Dutch: Nederlands Gereformeerde Kerken, NGK) (1967 – 2023) was a conservative Reformed Protestant Christian denomination in the Kingdom of the Netherlands. The denomination was formed in 1967 following a schism within the Reformed Churches in the Netherlands (Liberated).

In 2017 the denomination began the process of merging with the Reformed Churches in the Netherlands (Liberated), which together formed, on 1 May 2023, the Dutch Reformed Churches, a new denomination.

== History ==
The Netherlands Reformed Churches has a history that coincides to a great extent with that of the Reformed Churches (Liberated) of which it was a part until the early 1960s. The latter denomination arose out of a conflict within the Reformed Churches in the Netherlands over the covenant and the power of the general synod. After that schism, referred to as the Liberation (Dutch Vrijmaking), the Liberated churches became a very conservative and orthodox denomination. Wary of the liberal tendencies within various Reformed denominations, they started to develop a number of cultural and political structures and institutes, whose membership was restricted to church members. Some in the church held the view that the Liberated church was the only true church in the Netherlands and implied that all other Christians were in violation of God's command to be joined to God's covenant people. A sizeable group disagreed with that view.

In 1964, the disagreement came to a head, when Rev. Van der Ziel was accused of errors in his teaching and was found guilty by the synod of the Reformed Churches (Liberated), which defrocked him. Many members protested that measure and in 1966 drew up an open letter with a petition to voice their protest. However, local church councils responded by excommunicating members who had signed the petition. Those members and many who followed them voluntarily formed a new group.

The new federation of Reformed Churches was referred to as buitenverbanders (literally "those outside the denomination") until 1979, when the current name, Netherlands Reformed Churches, was adopted.

== Doctrine and practice ==
In teaching, the Netherlands Reformed Churches were in many ways an orthodox Reformed Church. They held to the traditional confessions of the ancient church (the Nicene Creed, the Apostles' Creed, and the Athanasian Creed), as well as the Three Forms of Unity. As a Calvinist church, they practiced infant baptism.

However, the denomination was very loosely organised. As a result of the bad experiences with synodical authority, the local congregations had much more power and the general synod much less than in most other Reformed churches. Thus, there were many variations and differences between local congregations. Some were very traditional; others were more heavily influenced by contemporary evangelical practices and had replaced traditional Dutch organ music with praise bands. Also, the synod of the Netherlands Reformed Churches had recently allowed women to serve as deacons, elders, and pastors, but most local churches did not allow that. Such variations had made contacts with other churches somewhat more complicated. There had been close contacts with the Reformed Churches in the Netherlands (Liberated). Even though the widespread desire to be reunited to each other had been hampered by deep-running disagreements over both doctrine and practice, the two denominations officially merged into the Dutch Reformed Churches in 2023.

The Netherlands Reformed Churches were also close to the Christian Reformed Churches. After the formation of the Protestant Church in the Netherlands, two protesting congregations from the former Reformed Churches in the Netherlands joined the Netherlands Reformed Church.

== Statistics ==
In 2011 The Netherlands Reformed Churches had 33,030 members; about 20,975 were communicants, and 12,045 were non-communicants, who were served by a total of 86 pastors. Women became eligible to ascend to deaconship in 1985, and in 2004 the Church allowed women to become elders. By the time of its absorption into the Dutch Reformed Churches, 31 congregations allowed all ministries and positions to be filled by women, 16 congregations allowed elders and deacons to be women, in 16 churches the office of deacon was open for women. In 20 congregations, no women officers were allowed.

By 2025, the new domination reported 130,000 members across 320 congregations, becoming the second largest Protestant denomination in the country.

== Missions ==
The Netherlands Reformed Congregations had missions in Nqutu in South Africa, and a mission in Sumba in Indonesia. It also had a translating Reformed literature agency, this was the Spanish Work in Latin America. The church maintained relations with denominations in Hungary and Romania. In France they supported the National Union of Independent Reformed Evangelical Churches of France. These missions were supported by the congregations.

The national magazine of the church was Opbouw (construction).
