= Dutch Reformed Churches =

Dutch religious denomination

- Nederlandse Gereformeerde Kerken
- Type: Continental Reformed
- Classification: Christian
- Orientation: Protestant
- Theology: Calvinist
- Governance: Presbyterian
- Region: Netherlands
- Origin: May 1, 2023
- Merger of: Reformed Churches in the Netherlands (Liberated); Netherlands Reformed Churches
- Congregations: 318 (2025)
- Members: 130,842 (2025)

The Dutch Reformed Churches (Dutch: Nederlandse Gereformeerde Kerken, NGK) is a Reformed Christian denomination, formed on May 1, 2023 as a merger of the Reformed Churches in the Netherlands (Liberated) and Netherlands Reformed Churches (Nederlands Gereformeerde Kerken).

== History ==
In the early 20th century, disagreements arose within the Reformed Churches in the Netherlands over the Covenant Theology view of Abraham Kuyper, so that several pastors disagreed with it. This dispute came to a head during World War II, when the General Synod ruled in favor of Kuyper's view which essentially questioned the inclusion of the children of believers in the Covenant. Many theologians and pastors disagreed with this decision, claiming that it contradicted the simple facts of the Scriptures, and tried to appeal the decision.

The General Synod strictly enforced this view, requiring, among others, that new graduates (new graduates of the Theological Seminary) seek to subscribe to the Kuyperian point of view. Protesters also alleged that the General Synod was abusing its functional authority, staying longer than the three years allowed by Church Order legislation. In 1944, many pastors and theologians who opposed Abraham Kuyper's view were excommunicated by the General Synod. Therefore, a large number of local congregations broke away from the Reformed Churches in the Netherlands, led by Prof. Dr. Klaas Schilder among others, to form his own denomination, the Reformed Churches in the Netherlands (Liberated) (Gereformeerde Kerken in Nederland (vrijgemaakt)). This event was called Liberation (Vrijmaking). Since then there have been no serious attempts at reconciliation by either side.

In 1967, a new controversy arose over the exclusivity of the Reformed Churches in the Netherlands (Liberated) (GKV) as a true Christian church in Netherlands. The denomination decided that the GKV were the only true Christian churches in the country, which is why many members left the denomination.

In the same year, these members constituted the Netherlands Reformed Churches (Nederlands Gereformeerde Kerken, NGK).

In the following decades, however, the GKV changed its position, starting to recognize the existence of other truly Christian churches in the Netherlands. This led to rapprochement between the GKV and the NGK. In 2017, the two denominations began negotiating a merger. In 2021, it was decided by both churches that the merger will take place on March 1, 2023, the year in which the GKV and NGK will cease to exist, to give way to a new denomination called Dutch Reformed Churches (Nederlandse Gereformeerde Kerken). However, in 2022, the merger was delayed by two months to May 1, 2023.

== Doctrine ==
The denomination subscribes to the Apostles' Creed, the Nicene-Constantinopolitan Creed, the Athanasian Creed, the Belgic Confession, the Canons of Dort, and the Heidelberg Catechism. In addition, it allows the ordination of women and paedocommunion.

In 2025, the denomination began to allow homosexuals in a romantic relationship to be members, participate in the Lord's Supper, and exercise all functions within the denomination. At the same Synod, it was decided that homosexual people, even in a romantic relationship, can be ordained in all offices of the denomination. However, some local churches have refused to comply with the ruling, claiming that people in same-sex relationships are not eligible for ordination.

== Statistics ==
In 2023, when its first yearbook was published, the denomination claimed to have 146,568 members in approximately 320 churches.

In 2024, the denomination's second yearbook reported that membership had fallen to 133,708.

In 2025, there were an estimated 130,842 members, in 318 churches.
