= Reformed Churches in the Netherlands (Liberated) =

Orthodox-Protestant church

- Classification: Protestant
- Orientation: Neo-Calvinist
- Polity: Presbyterian
- Associations: International Conference of Reformed Churches
- Origin: 1944; Netherlands
- Separated from: Reformed Churches in the Netherlands (now part of the Protestant Church in the Netherlands)
- Separations: 1967 Netherlands Reformed Churches; 2003 New Reformed Churches
- Merged into: Dutch Reformed Churches (2023)
- Congregations: 270
- Members: 120,000 members
- Ministers: 288

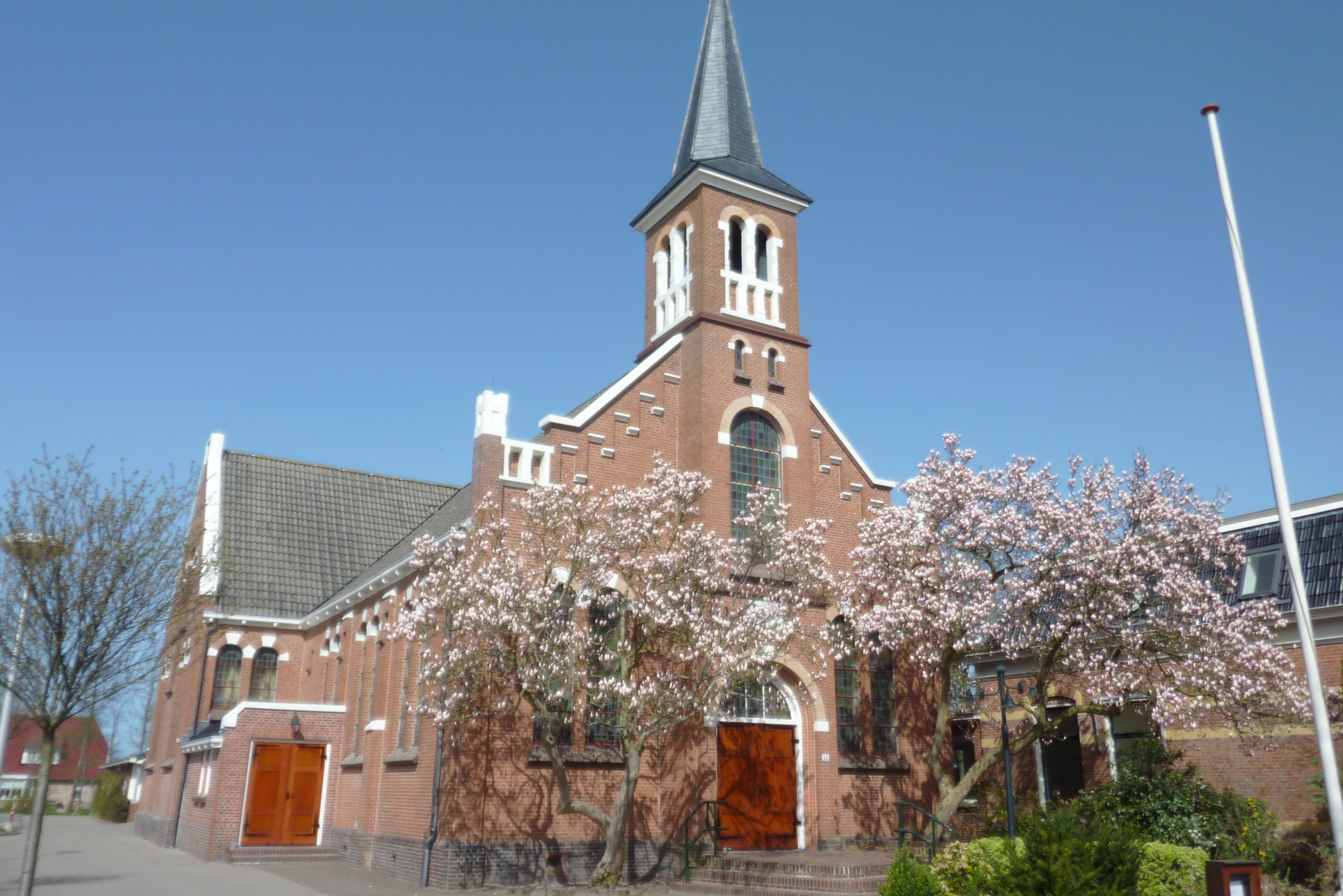
Schildwolde Reformed Church

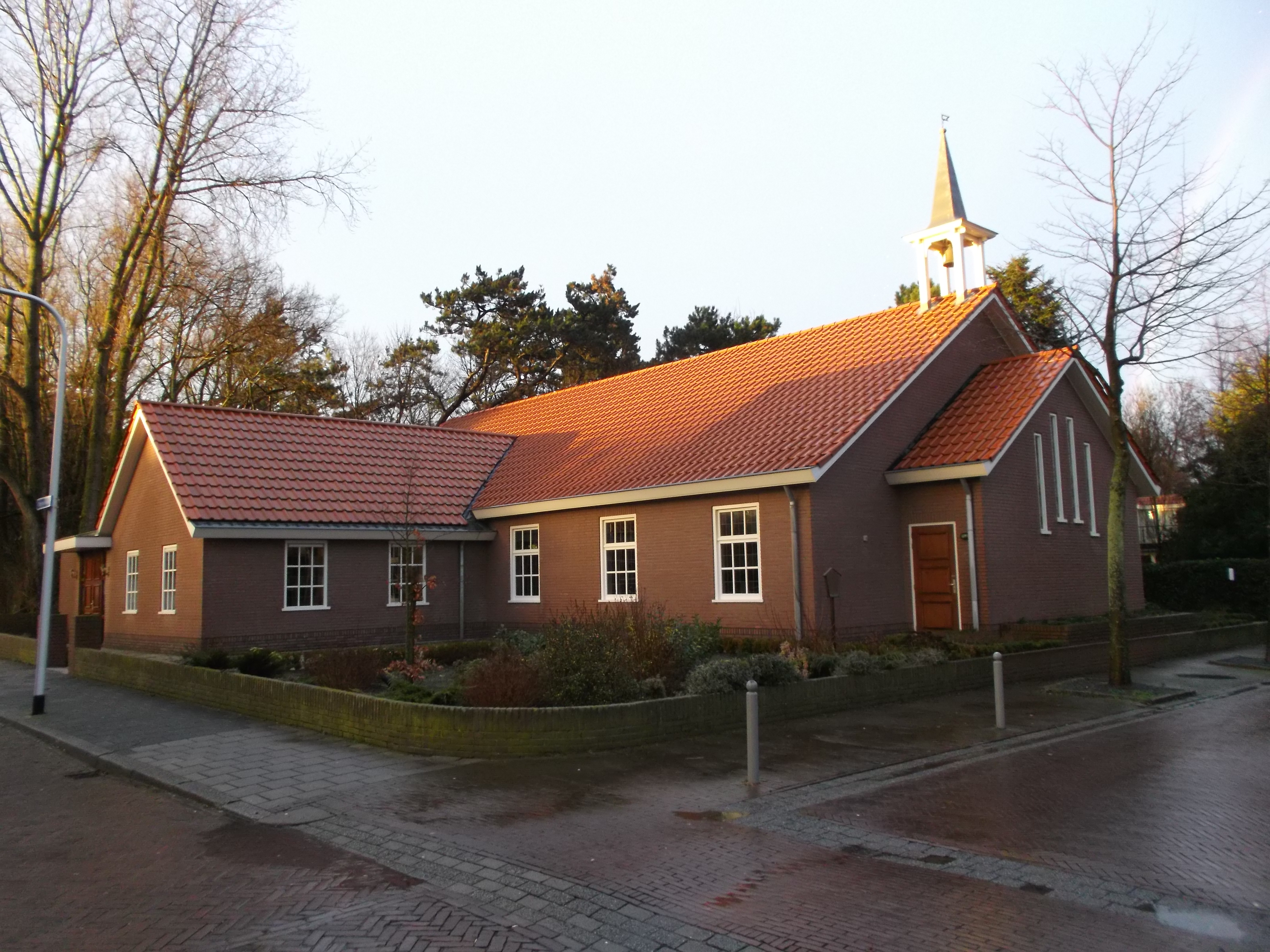
Katwijk Reformed Church (Liberated)

The Reformed Churches in the Netherlands (Liberated) (Dutch: Gereformeerde Kerken in Nederland (vrijgemaakt)) was an orthodox Calvinist federation of churches. This church body arose in 1944 out of the so-called Liberation (Vrijmaking) from the Reformed Churches in the Netherlands, when many pastors and members refused to go along with the General Synod's demand to hold to "presumed regeneration of infants" at their baptism. Klaas Schilder played an important role in the Liberation. There were 270 affiliated local congregations with a total of about 120,000 members in 2016.

From 2017 onwards the denomination had been in the process of merging with the Netherlands Reformed Churches. On May 1, 2023, the two denominations officially merged into the Dutch Reformed Churches.

== Name ==
After the Liberation the church maintained that they were the legitimate continuation of the Reformed Churches in the Netherlands and thus adopted that name (Dutch Gereformeerde Kerken in Nederland). However, because the denomination from which they had separated continued using that name, the addition "liberated" was used colloquially, although never officially, to distinguish the new denomination. Members of the Liberated church referred to the denomination from which they separated as the synodical church, which signified the remaining members' adherence to the rulings by the National Synod against which the Liberated churches protested. An older name for the Reformed Churches (Liberated) was Article 31 Churches in reference to one of the articles in the Church Order at the centre of the dispute between the two groups.

== Organisation and government ==
The Reformed Churches (Liberated) had a structure which combined congregational and presbyterian polity, with strong emphasis on the authority vested in each congregation. Local congregations were ruled by a church council or consistory, made up of the pastor(s) and the elders. The church council ruled and organised the congregation. Most meetings of the church council were open to the members, except when matters of church discipline were discussed. All congregations also had a number of deacons who assisted the church council with more practical matters. Elders and deacons were elected for limited terms.

Nationwide the Reformed Churches (Liberated) were organised as follows. A group of local congregations were organised in a classis. In 2018 there were 31 classes in the denomination. Decisions by the local church council could be appealed to classis. A number of classes were grouped together in a regional synod (Dutch particuliere synode). The highest body was the national or general synod, which convened every three years.

== Doctrine and practice ==
The Reformed Churches (Liberated) were an orthodox Neo-Calvinist Protestant denomination. They subscribed to the infallibity of the Bible, to the Nicene Creed, the Apostles' Creed, the Athanasian Creed and the Three Forms of Unity (the Heidelberg Catechism, the Belgic Confession and the Canons of Dort).

As Calvinists, the Reformed Churches (Liberated) practised infant baptism for the children of believers (as well as adult baptism for adult converts). Children were taught the tenets of the faith and encouraged to publicly profess their faith (usually in late teens), by which they became professing (and voting) members of the church. The Lord's Supper was typically "closed", meaning that only professing members were permitted to participate, although many congregations would allow guests to participate if prior notice (through the use of so-called communion letters [avondmaalsbriefjes]) or satisfactory proof of a living faith was given. Children who had not professed their faith were excluded from participation in the Lord's Supper.

According to Ad de Bruijne, the denomination regarded homosexuality as sin, but "hardly any local church really disciplines it when a couple comes to the church and wants to partake in the Holy Supper."

== History ==
The Reformed Churches (Liberated) came out of the Reformed Churches in the Netherlands. By the early 20th century, disputes were starting to arise within this denomination, especially about Abraham Kuyper's view of the covenant. These came to a head during World War II, when the general synod ruled in favour of Kuyper's view that essentially questioned the inclusion of children of believers into the covenant. A number of theologians and pastors disagreed with this ruling, arguing that it contradicted the plain facts of Scripture, and attempted to appeal the decision. The general synod enforced this view strictly, demanding among others that new licentiates (recent graduates from the theological seminary seeking a call) subscribe to the Kuyperian view. The protesters also objected that the general synod was abusing its authority by remaining functional for longer than the three years allowed under the rules of the Church Order. In 1944, when a number of protesting pastors and theologians were defrocked by the general synod, a large number of local congregations separated from the Reformed Churches in the Netherlands, led by Klaas Schilder among others, to form their own denomination, an event referred to as the Liberation (Vrijmaking). No serious attempts at reconciliation were ever made by either side.

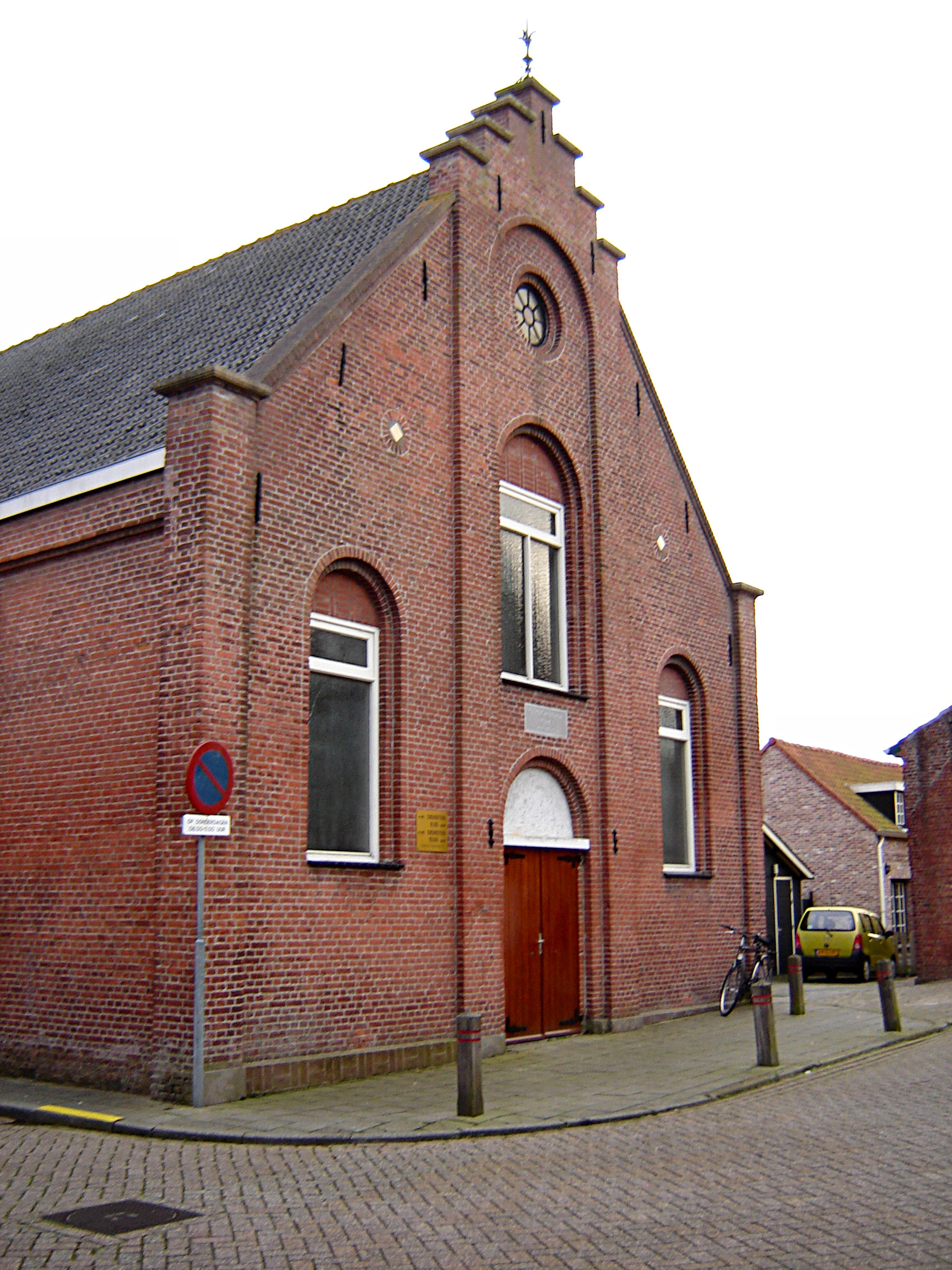
Liberated church in Hoek, Zeeland

The first decades after the Liberation were marked by a considerable inward turn. The Reformed Churches (Liberated) shunned outside contacts. They formed their own cultural, societal and political organisations. In these early years, there was a powerful radical wing that supported the view that the Liberated churches were the "only true Church" in the Netherlands. This view led in part to the schism of 1967, when a group that formed the Netherlands Reformed Churches broke away. The "only true Church" movement soon waned in influence, though it remained in existence until the start of the 21st century. By the 1990s, serious attempts to connect with like-minded orthodox churches were being made.

In 2003, a small number of members separated from the Reformed Churches (Liberated) to form the New Reformed Churches out of protest against recent rulings by the general synod. This schism was instigated largely by the Reformanda movement, a continuing element of the radical wing of the church, which still held to the "only true church" view. This movement objected to what it saw as liberalising tendencies within the denomination, in particular to the introduction of hymns (Reformanda approves only the Psalter) and the synod's decisions regarding the Fourth Commandment (keeping of the Sabbath) and remarriage after divorce. Reformanda alleged that in these areas the Liberated churches were violating Scripture and the movement urged local congregations to refuse to confirm the synod's Acts. The objectors decided to secede. They formed the Reformed Churches in the Netherlands (restored), with 10 congregations and 1,475 members (2022).

In 2009 yet another group of people separated from the Reformed Churches (Liberated). They formed the Reformed Churches Netherlands. In 2024 this group merged with the New Reformed Churches into the Reformed Churches.

Until 2004, the Reformed Churches (Liberated) enjoyed slow but steady growth. However, in the years since, the denomination has seen a reversal. In 2004, nearly 800 members left, in 2005, the church lost 340 members. Most departing members of 2007 joined the Protestant Church in the Netherlands, while others left for the Netherlands Reformed Churches, the Christian Reformed Churches and Evangelical churches.

In 2015, there were 120,688 members in 277 congregations.

== Societal organisations ==
After the Liberation, a number of church-related political and cultural institutions were founded. The daily newspaper Nederlands Dagblad originated within the Reformed Churches (Liberated) and, although it now serves a wider Christian and Reformed audience, still has strong ties to the denomination.

A political party, the Gereformeerd Politiek Verbond (GPV) was organised as well. Traditionally, this party was always a small conservative party with roughly 2 out of 150 seats in the House of Representatives. In the 1980s and 1990s, the party became more progressive. This party often collaborated with the RPF and the SGP, two similar political parties of comparable size, organised by other orthodox Reformed denominations. In 2001, GPV merged with RPF to form the ChristenUnie. In the 2006 elections this party gained 6 seats in parliament as well as a pivotal role in the resulting coalition government. Former GPV politician Eimert van Middelkoop became Minister of Defence.

=== Educational institutes ===
The church ran 129 schools: 124 elementary schools, four comprehensive high schools, and one college. These private schools enjoyed special protection by Royal Decree, which means that they could not be forced to accept pupils from backgrounds that were incompatible with their Reformed views. Partly as a result of this Royal Decree, they could only employ staff who are members of the Reformed Churches (Liberated), although they would enroll pupils from families willing to comply with the Reformed doctrines.

It had a theological institute in Kampen, the Theological University of the Reformed Churches. It offered the Bachelor of Theology and the Master of Divinity.

== International relations ==
The Reformed Churches (Liberated) has been a member of the International Conference of Reformed Churches, until their membership was suspended in 2017 for having adopted women's ordination. They maintained strong relations with many foreign Reformed and Presbyterian churches, and sister church relations existed with dozens of churches around the world.

Their relationships with the Canadian Reformed Churches and Free Reformed Churches of Australia have been particularly strong in the past, seeing as these federations were founded shortly after World War II by Dutch immigrants who had come out of the Liberation. However, in 2012 the FRCA expressed concern at what they perceived to be a "liberal way of interpreting Scripture" present in the RCN, and in June 2015 decided to suspend the sister-church relationship, The Canadian Reformed Churches decided at Synod Dunnville 2016 that accepting RCN attestations and allowing RCN ministers on the pulpit would no longer be automatic. The FRCA completely terminated their relationship with the Reformed Churches (Liberated) at their Synod Bunbury 2018, and the Canadian Reformed Churches did the same at their Synod Edmonton 2019. The Reformed Church in the United States had made a similar decision in May 2018.

The Liberated Churches were active on the mission field and collaborated closely with other Calvinist churches.

== See also ==
- Seakle Greijdanus
- Kampen Theological University of the Reformed Churches (Liberated)
