= Christian Reformed Churches =

Protestant church in the Netherlands

Christian Reformed Churches in the Netherlands
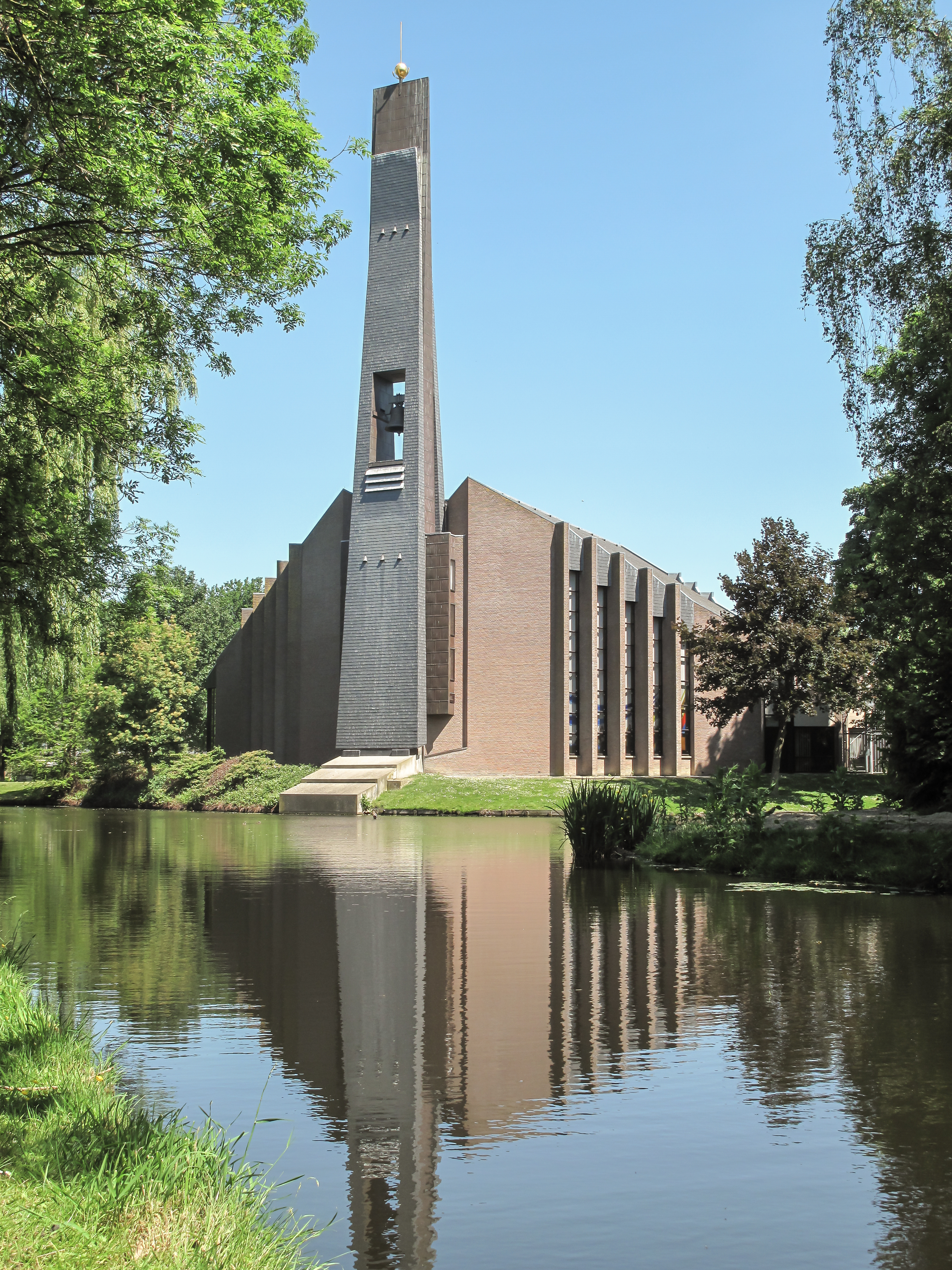
- Classification: Protestant
- Theology: Evangelical Calvinist
- Polity: Presbyterian
- Associations: International Conference of Reformed Churches
- Region: Netherlands
- Origin: 1869; Netherlands
- Separated from: Dutch Reformed Church
- Separations: Reformed Churches in the Netherlands (1892); Reformed Congregations (1907)
- Congregations: 180 (2014)
- Members: 73,692 (2014)

The Christian Reformed Churches in the Netherlands (Dutch: Christelijke Gereformeerde Kerken in Nederland) is a Protestant church in the Netherlands.

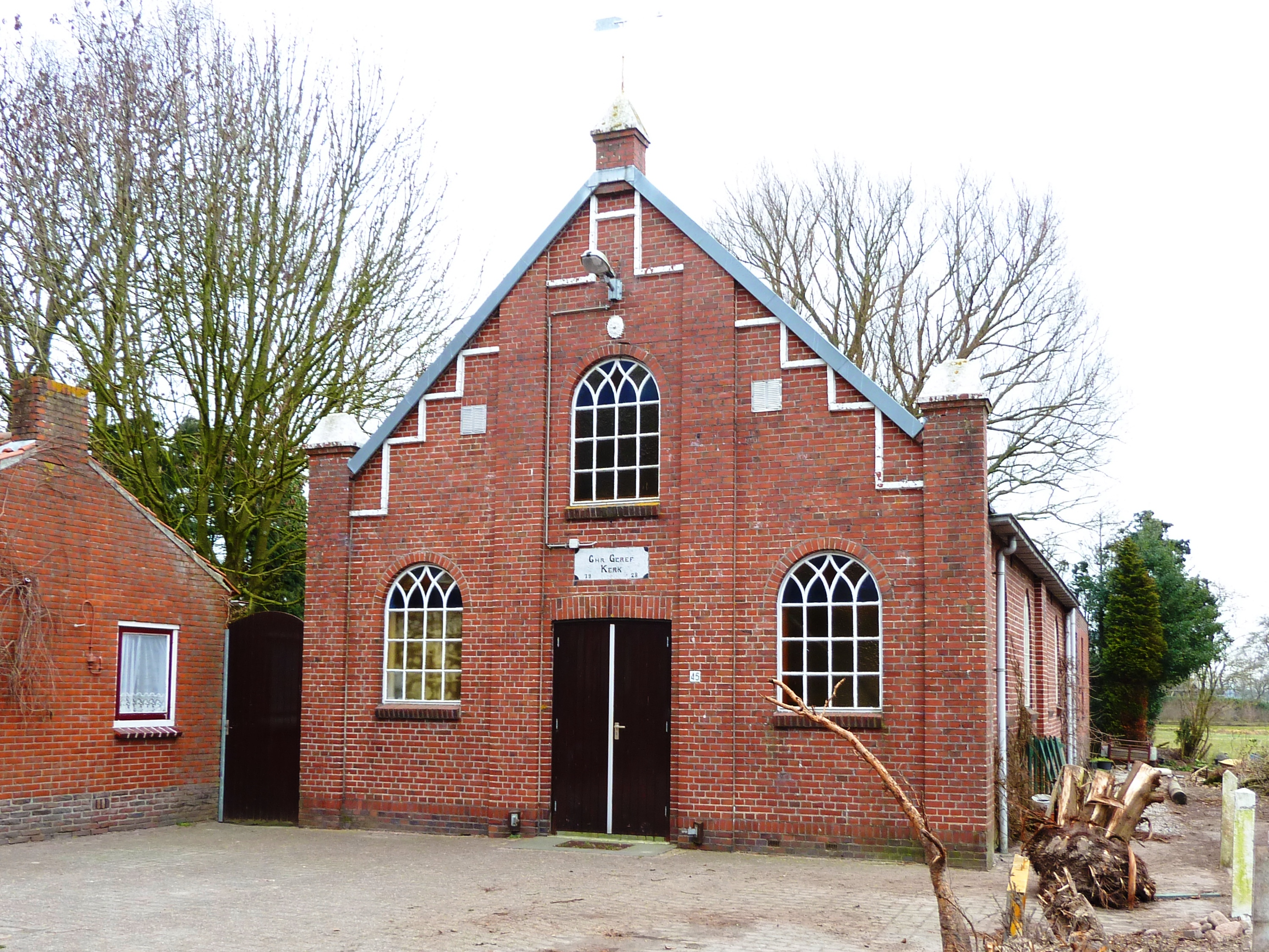
Christian Reformed Church in Lutjegast

== History ==
The original name of the church was Christian Reformed Church in the Netherlands (Christelijke Gereformeerde Kerk in Nederland, CGKN). The church was formed in 1869 by the merger of two churches, the Reformed Churches under the Cross and the Separated Christian Congregations, which both separated from the Dutch Reformed Church in 1834; an event known as the Afscheiding. Most of the CGKN merged into the Reformed Churches in the Netherlands in 1892; a small part remained independent, and carried this name until it was renamed in 1947 to Christian Reformed Churches.

At the first Synod eight congregations were represented. A Theological Seminary was opened in The Hague and later was moved to Apeldoorn in 1919. Since then the churches grew steadily till 1985, when membership was 75,000, and today membership fluctuates around this number. It has 13 classes. At the beginning of 2022, there were 181 local congregations. The church withdrew from the Reformed Ecumenical Council in 1989, and joined the International Conference of Reformed Churches in 1995.

It has a theological institute in Apeldoorn, the Theological University of Apeldoorn. It offers the Bachelor of Theology and the Master of Divinity. There are two masters. One of the master's programs is designed for men who want to become a minister, the other has a broader design.

== Theology ==
The church subscribe to the infallibility of the Bible, to the Nicene Creed, the Apostles' Creed, the Athanasian Creed and the Three Forms of Unity (the Heidelberg Catechism, the Belgic Confession and the Canons of Dort). All the office bearers have signed a document that they promise not to teach anything that contradicts this basis.

There is officially (in terms of church law) no room for female ministers, elders and deacons. However, there are some female elders and deacons locally. They are mainly found in churches that work (intensively) with churches that belong to the Dutch Reformed Churches. Within the church there is a heated discussion about this, as well as about hermeneutics.

== Organisation ==
Churches that are situated in close proximity usually meet twice per year by way of classis meetings. Three or four classes meet together annually in what is called a particular synod, of which there are four in the Christian Reformed Church in the Netherlands. Once every three years, the churches meet in a General Synod. The Synod is made up of 52 office bearers who are delegated by the four particular synods. The professors of the Theological University of Apeldoorn are present as advisers.

== Liturgy ==
Liturgically there are major differences within the CGK. In conservative congregations, only psalms from the psalter of 1773 are sung to the accompaniment of the organ. In many other congregations psalms are sung from more contemporary psalters. In addition to the psalms, many churches also sing hymns and songs from collections such as Opwekking, Op Toonhoogte, Weerklank and the Liedboek voor de Kerken. The lyrics are often projected by a projector. In many churches these songs are accompanied by a piano and music group.

In almost all churches the Ten Commandments are read in the morning service and the faith is confessed with the Apostles' Creed in the afternoon service.

== Statistics ==
In January 2012, the church has 74,286 members in 181 churches. In recent years membership was steady. In the next year in early 2013 membership grew by more than 30.

== Deputies and committees ==
The various tasks of the churches are dealt with by several committees and deputies, appointed and mandated by the (general) synod.

- The churches have their own Theological University in Apeldoorn (TUA).
- Two youth work organizations are active within the church.
  - CGJO (Christian Reformed Youth Organization)
  - LCJ (National Youth Work Contact)
- The official publication of the Christian Reformed Churches is ''De Wekker'', which is published every two weeks.
- Foundation ''Uit de Levensbron'' publishes sermons by CGK preachers.

== Developments ==
CGK members in the Netherlands per capita in 2008

From the very beginning of the Christian Reformed Churches, there have been differences and people have spoken of a left and right wing, by analogy with the political spectrum. In 1966, a foundation was established to prevent conservative preachers from leaving the CGK. The name of the foundation is: ''Bewaar het Pand''. Within this foundation they wanted to hold on to the preaching that pays attention to the personal application of salvation. The conservative CGK churches has never been in favor of unity with the Reformed Churches in the Netherlands (Liberated) or the Netherlands Reformed Churches.

Locally, churches have merged with the Reformed Churches in the Netherlands (Liberated) or the Netherlands Reformed Churches like the churches in Doesburg, Arnhem and Lelystad. In 2012, many Christian Reformed missions were constituted as full-fledged congregations.

== Interchurch relations ==
Some Christian Reformed Churches in the Netherlands seek (locally) cooperation with the Dutch Reformed Churches, the merger of the Reformed Churches in the Netherlands (Liberated) and the Dutch Reformed Churches. It supports missions in Thailand, and Sulawesi, Indonesia, the Toraja Mamasa Church was founded by missionaries of the Christian Reformed denomination.

Complete correspondence:

- Free Reformed Churches in North America
- Free Church of Scotland
- Free Church of Scotland (Continuing)
- Reformed Presbyterian Church of Ireland
- Reformed Churches in South Africa
- Igrejas Evangelicas Reformadas do Brasil
- Reformed Churches of New Zealand

Limited Correspondence:

- Dutch Reformed Church in Botswana
- Reformed Churches of Botswana
- Orthodox Presbyterian Church
- Reformed Church in Japan
- Presbyterian Church in Korea (Koshin)
- Christian Reformed Churches of Australia

== See also ==
- Free Reformed Churches of North America, the North American affiliate of the Christian Reformed Churches
- Christian Reformed Church in North America, a denomination not affiliated with the Christian Reformed Churches but having a coincidentally similar name in North America.
