= Reformed Churches in the Netherlands =

Former Protestant church that merged in 2004

- Gereformeerde Kerken in Nederland
- Classification: Protestant
- Orientation: Calvinist
- Polity: Presbyterianism
- Region: The Netherlands
- Origin: 1892
- Separated from: Dutch Reformed Church
- Separations: Gereformeerde Kerken in Hersteld Verband ("Reformed Churches in Restored Union", 1926); Reformed Churches in the Netherlands (Liberated) (1944)
- Merged into: Protestant Church in the Netherlands (2004)
- Congregations: 857 at the time of merger
- Members: 675,000 at the time of merger

History of the Churches in the Netherlands

The Reformed Churches in the Netherlands (Dutch: Gereformeerde Kerken in Nederland, abbreviated Gereformeerde kerk) was the second largest Protestant church in the Netherlands and one of the two major Calvinist denominations along with the Dutch Reformed Church since 1892 until being merged into the Protestant Church in the Netherlands (PKN) in 2004. The PKN is the continuation of the Dutch Reformed Church, the Reformed Churches in the Netherlands and the Evangelical Lutheran Church in the Kingdom of the Netherlands.

== History ==
The Reformed Churches in the Netherlands was founded in 1892 as a merger of two groups that had split off from the Dutch Reformed Church:

- a part of the Christian Reformed Church in the Netherlands (Christelijke Gereformeerde Kerk in Nederland, CGKN), which had originated in the 1834 Dutch Reformed Church split, and
- the group around Abraham Kuyper, which was formed in the 1886 Dutch Reformed Church split.

The other part of the CGKN that stayed out of this union remains independent; it was renamed to "Christian Reformed Churches" in 1947.

Abraham Kuyper was the most important leader of the movement, and under his leadership the gereformeerden became a separate so-called "pillar" in Dutch society, next to the hervormden and the Roman Catholics. Part of the gereformeerde pillar were for example the Vrije Universiteit Amsterdam and the Anti-Revolutionary Party, a political party now part of the Christian Democratic Appeal.

Since its founding in 1892, two groups have separated from the GKN (Gereformeerde Kerk Nederland). The first split was in 1926, over a conflict about biblical interpretation: the orthodox majority maintained the historicity of the account of Adam and Eve, while the more liberal wing deemed it merely allegorical and left to form the Gereformeerde Kerken in Hersteld Verband. In 1971/1972, the GKN renounced the historic position.

The second schism, called the Vrijmaking ("Liberation", that is: from synodal authority), occurred in 1944, when the Reformed Churches in the Netherlands (Liberated) split off from the Reformed Churches in the Netherlands.

The long process of reuniting with the Dutch Reformed Church began in 1962 and ended on May 1, 2004, when the GKN, the NHK and the Evangelical Lutheran Church merged to form the Protestant Church in the Netherlands. At that time, the Reformed Churches in the Netherlands had around 675,000 members, 400,000 of whom were churchgoers. There were 857 congregations, with some 1,000 church buildings.

Seven congregations did not agree with the merger and founded the Continued Reformed Churches in the Netherlands on May 8, 2004.

== Theology ==
Until World War II, the Gereformeerde Kerk was characterized by a classical neo-Calvinist belief. The church thought of itself as the most true church of Christ. The main influence on the theological views was from Abraham Kuyper and Herman Bavinck. After World War II, the character of the church changed. After 1962, it became an open church, with space and freedom for various beliefs. Modern theologians in the gereformeerde church are Gerrit Cornelis Berkouwer (1903–1996) and Harry M. Kuitert (1924–2017).
