= History of Reformed Christianity =

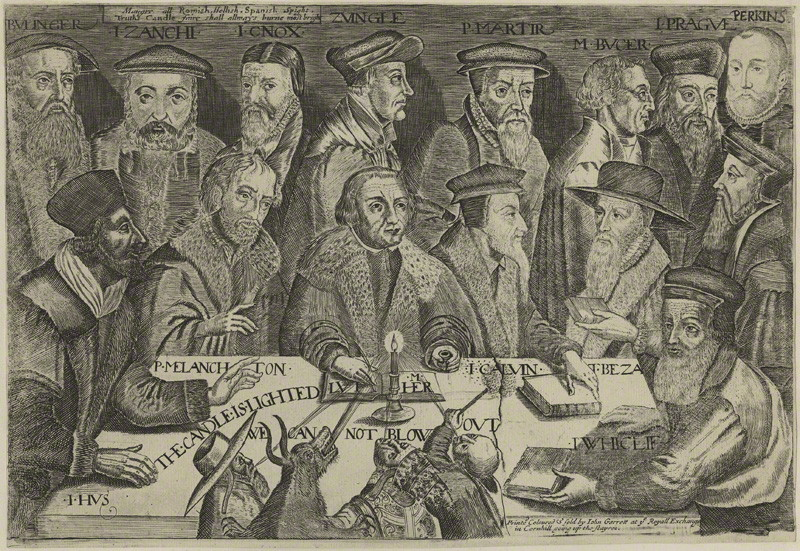
This 17th century engraving includes Reformed theologians Theodore Beza, Martin Bucer, Heinrich Bullinger, John Calvin, John Knox, William Perkins, Peter Martyr Vermigli, Girolamo Zanchi, Johannes Oecolampadius and Ulrich Zwingli gathered around Martin Luther with a candle representing the Gospel. The pope, a cardinal, a monk, and a demon try to blow out the candle.

Reformed Christianity originated with the Reformation in Switzerland when Huldrych Zwingli began preaching what would become the first form of the Reformed doctrine in Zürich in 1519.

Zwingli and John Oecolampadius became embroiled in conflict over the real presence of Christ in the Eucharist with Martin Luther, leading to a division between Lutheran and Reformed Protestants. Several theologians succeeded Zwingli, the best known of which is John Calvin in Geneva, but other reformers like John Oecolampadius, Heinrich Bullinger, Peter Martyr Vermigli, and Wolfgang Musculus were also influential in the development of Reformed theology.

As well as questioning transubstantiation, the Reformers also supported the ideas of sola fide (‘faith alone’) and sola Scriptura (‘the Bible alone’).

Reformed faith spread throughout Europe in the 16th century, with different character in different places. Calvinism was the dominant form of Protestantism in France. After a period of struggle, Calvinists were officially tolerated there. Under the leadership of John Knox, the Church of Scotland, which is Reformed, became the established church in Scotland. In the Netherlands, Calvinism also became the official established religion following a period of persecution. During the Reformation, Calvinism was the primary Protestant faith in Belgium but was eradicated in favor of the Counter-Reformation. Germany remained predominantly Lutheran during the 16th century, but Reformed worship was promoted intermittently by rulers in Electoral Palatinate, Margraviate of Brandenburg, and other German states. Reformed ideas also influenced Protestants in Eastern Europe, especially Hungary and Romania. The reform of the Church of England was also influenced by Reformed theologians, and remained so throughout the 16th century.

== Origins (1519–1531) ==
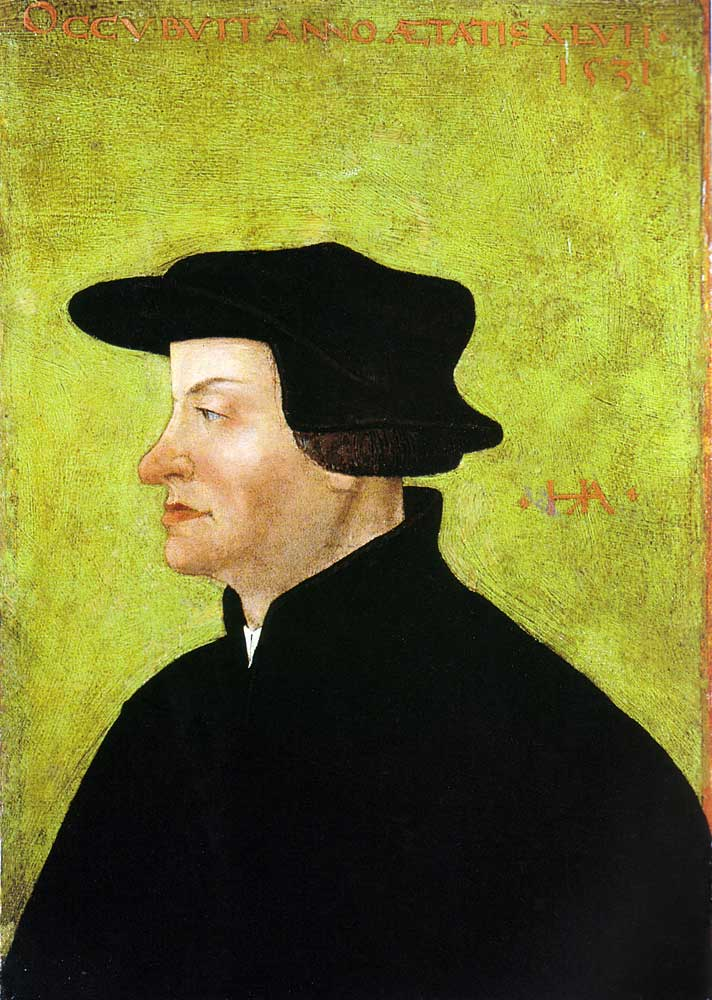
Huldrych Zwingli as depicted by Hans Asper in an oil portrait from 1531 (Kunstmuseum Winterthur)

Huldrych Zwingli, whose theology is considered the first expression of Reformed theology was appointed to ministry in Zürich, Switzerland, in 1519. He was influenced by Renaissance humanist Desiderius Erasmus, which led him to study the New Testament and the early Church Fathers as well as to preach from the Bible. Zwingli was also aware of and influenced by the Wittenberg reformer Martin Luther, but he developed his theology independently and differed with him in several ways. Zwingli opposed any religious practice for which he could find no scriptural justification, such as the use of images, organs, and singing in worship while Luther actively opposed the destruction of images in churches. Zwingli's emphasis on strict adherence to God's command as found in his word also led to greater moral activism in Zwinglian Reformation movements than in Lutheran ones.

Martin Bucer, Wolfgang Capito, John Oecolampadius, and Guillaume Farel were also influential figures in the development of Reformed theology. These reformers came from diverse academic backgrounds, but later distinctives of Reformed theology can already be detected in their thought, especially the priority of scripture as a source of authority. Scripture was also viewed as a unified whole, which led to a covenantal view of the sacraments of baptism and the Lord's Supper as visible signs of the covenant of grace. Another Reformed distinctive of these theologians was their denial of the bodily presence of Christ in the Lord's supper. They also understood salvation to be by grace alone, and affirmed a doctrine of particular election (the teaching that some people are chosen by God for salvation). Martin Luther and his successor Philipp Melanchthon were undoubtedly significant influences on these theologians, and to a larger extent later Reformed theologians. The doctrine of justification by faith alone was a direct inheritance from Luther.

At first Zwingli regarded Luther as an ally, and union between the followers of Zwingli and Luther may have been possible but for controversies over the Eucharist beginning in 1524. Luther strongly believed it necessary to maintain that Christ is physically present in the Eucharist, while Zwingli along with his followers including John Oecolampadius in Basel favored a symbolic meaning to the rite which would be called sacramentarianism. Martin Bucer in Strasbourg took a mediating position. Luther labeled Zwingli, Oecolapadius, and others who took this view blasphemous, un-Christian, and fanatic. In 1529, German prince Philip of Hesse arranged the Marburg Colloquy as an attempt to reconcile the warring Protestant factions and forge an alliance. The two sides agreed on many points of doctrine but could find no common ground on the Eucharist, and Philip's hope for an alliance failed.

Throughout the 1520s, Zwingli's influence grew in Switzerland, though many Swiss, especially in rural and forest areas, remained loyal to the Catholic church and opposed Zwingli's reforms. Before 1530, some southern German cities supported Zwingli, and some German Lutheran theologians in other areas of Germany developed sacramentarian views independently of Zwingli, but they were quickly silenced by Lutheran theologians in Wittenberg. In early 1531, Phillip of Hesse formed the Schmalkaldic League, solidifying the Lutherans' hold on Germany to the exclusion of Zwinglianism. Meanwhile, Zwingli began to use force aggressively to solidify Protestant gains in Switzerland. Following success against Catholics in the First War of Kappel of 1529, Zurich enforced a harsh blockade on Catholic cantons, leading to the Second War of Kappel in 1531. The Zurichers were defeated, and Zwingli was killed in the battle. Catholics continued to hold power in a majority of Swiss cantons, though three-fifths of the population was Protestant.

== Second generation (1531–1555) ==
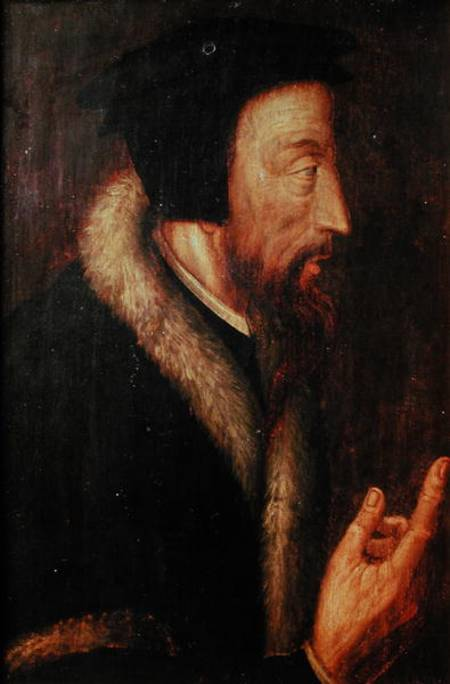
Sixteenth-century portrait of John Calvin by an unknown artist. From the collection of the Bibliothèque de Genève (Library of Geneva)

John Calvin is the most well-known Reformed theologian of the generation following Zwingli's death, but recent scholarship has argued that several previously overlooked individuals had at least as much influence on the development of Reformed Christianity and represented diverse theological viewpoints. Heinrich Bullinger, Zwingli's successor in Zurich, wrote more accessibly than his predecessor and his writings were distributed long after his death. Following Zwingli he argued for a figurative significance of the Eucharist. Peter Martyr Vermigli, a highly trained Reformed theologian of this era, taught a strong doctrine of double predestination, which teaches that God has chosen to save people for salvation and others for damnation, and held that Christ was really, though spiritually, present in the Eucharist, a position that Calvin would also take. Wolfgang Musculus's Common Places of the Christian Religion was the first Reformed systematic work of theology. Musculus taught a spiritual presence of Christ in the Eucharist and a cautious form of double predestination.

While Reformed ideas and churches found ever-widening distribution during this period, reaching as far as England and Poland, Lutheranism also increased its dominance in the Holy Roman Empire. The Augsburg Interim of 1548, a settlement between Holy Roman emperor Charles V and Protestants resulting from the Schmalkaldic War, made some concessions to Protestants but forced those who wished to practice their religion legally to adopt practices which the Reformed found repugnant. Some isolated Reformed churches were able to hold on in Germany including a church in Emden led by Polish reformer Jan Łaski which became an important center for Protestant refugees from the Low Countries. London and a few other cities in England; Wesel, Aachen, and Frankfurt, Germany; and Geneva, Switzerland were also important cities for Reformed refugees from the Low Countries, northern France, and other areas of the Holy Roman Empire where they were not tolerated. "Stranger churches" were established in these cities for refugee Protestants.

The Reformed movement was complex and variegated during this period, but the French reformer of Geneva John Calvin was arguably the most influential Reformed theologian of his time and his impact was long-lasting. His Institutes of the Christian Religion was published in 1536. It was widely distributed and considered by some to be the most important work of theology of the era. The Genevan Consistory, a church council made up of lay and clergy members who was given power to enforce morals legislation and excommunicate citizens, became a dominant force in everyday life. This relative ecclesiastical independence from civil authority was a rare achievement and considered by many to be the Reformed ideal.

== Spread (1555–1600) ==
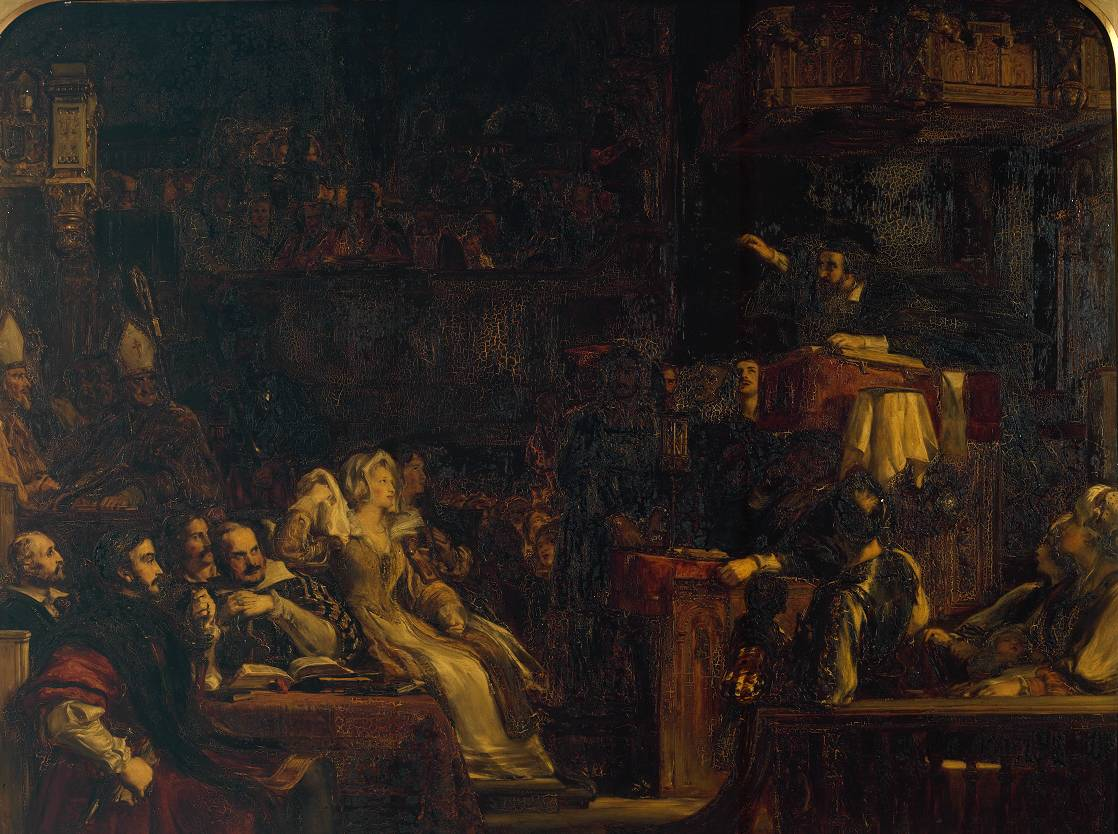
The Preaching of John Knox Before the Lords of the Congregation, 10th June 1559 by David Wilkie, Tate Museum, London

The Reformed faith took different shapes in different parts of Europe. In France, groups of Christians influenced by Protestant writers (who became known as Huguenots) formed secretly and started underground churches and informal Bible reading groups. Ministers were dispatched from Geneva and other Swiss cities along with a massive outpouring of propaganda which assured the Reformed nature of the French Reformation. Calvin also aided in the creation of the French Confession of Faith in 1559. The French Protestants did gain some notable allies, including Renée of France, daughter of King Louis XII, as well as Queen Jeanne III of Navarre and her son, Henry (who later converted to Roman Catholicism upon ascending the throne of France). The newly formed churches developed a presbyterial system of church government with national and regional synods. The network of synods proved helpful in mobilizing Reformed Christians to military resistance during the French Wars of Religion between Protestants and Catholics from 1562 to 1598. Calvin's successor in Geneva Theodore Beza also argued in his Right of Magistrates that armed resistance against tyrannical rulers was justified, which contradicted Calvin's earlier insistence on civil obedience and emboldened Huguenots to fight. The wars of religion left the French Reformed church between one-third and one-half the size of that at which it began with limited freedom to practice their religion, though intermittent conflicts continued. Unlike in the Genevan model and many other early Reformed churches, the Reformed Church in France remained relatively independent of the state.

John Willock, who had been exiled to Emden, and John Knox, who had spent five years exiled in Geneva, were the most influential figures of the Scottish Reformation. Knox preached to Scottish noblemen from 1555 to 1556, though he did not encourage the establishment of independent churches as was done in France. In 1557 a group of noblemen known as the Lords of the Congregation swore an oath, following a Scottish custom, to promote Protestant reforms in churches. Knox and Willock encouraged radical militant action even on the part of independent laypeople in areas where Catholic practices were re-instituted. In 1560 the Scottish Parliament adopted the broadly Reformed Scots Confession and instituted the Church of Scotland along Reformed lines, though bishops were retained within a presbyterial system. Despite the success of the Reformed in Scotland many people retained Catholic practices such as holy days and pilgrimages and the majority of parishes did not have qualified Reformed ministers by the end of the century.

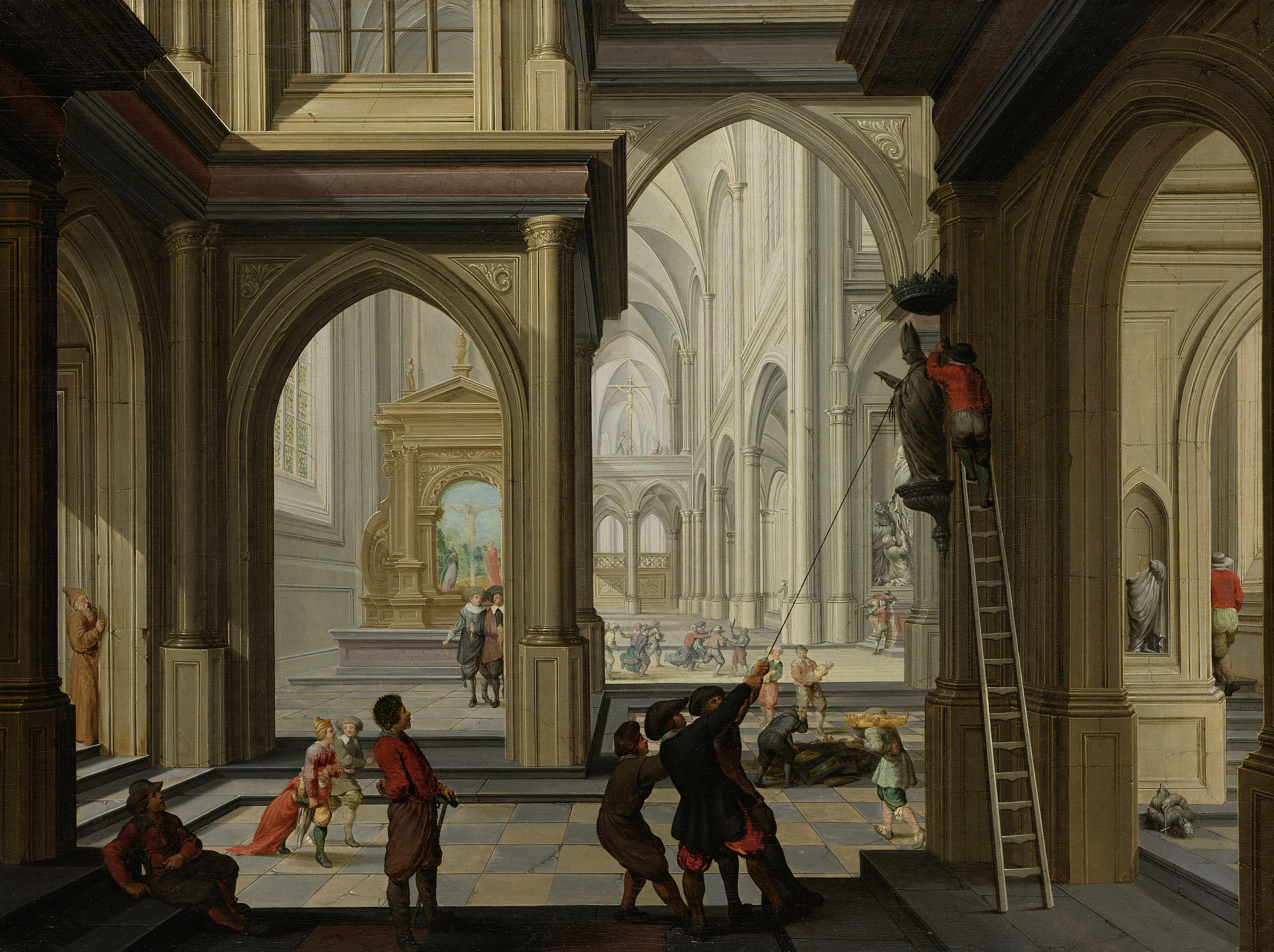
Iconoclasts in a church. by Dirk van Delen, 1630, Rijksmuseum Amsterdam

The Netherlands was affected by Reformation ideas early on due to linguistic and commercial ties with Germany. Though early Protestantism in the Netherlands was not exclusively Reformed in nature, and many early Protestant churches sought to allow both Lutheran and Reformed adherents within the same congregations, the influence of refugee centers in Emden and England lead to a decidedly Reformed orientation to these churches. A mass outbreak of iconoclasm in 1566 (known as the Beeldenstorm) prompted by popular open-air Protestant preaching lead to temporary toleration of Protestant preaching, and gradually administration of the sacraments, by magistrates in many Dutch cities. Military action initiated by Governor of the Netherlands Margaret of Parma later that year intended as punishment for the iconoclastic outbreaks brought an end to Reformed worship. Starting in 1572, many Dutch cities invited or allowed the invasion of exiled Netherlandish privateers known as Sea Beggars because they were dissatisfied with the overbearing rule of the Spanish "iron duke" of Alva, and Reformed worship was reinstated either immediately or gradually. The Dutch Reformed Church became the legally privileged religion in most of the region, though Catholicism and other Protestant sects were tolerated and a minority of the population became full members of the Reformed church.

There was frequent interchange between Swiss and German Protestants early in the Reformation, and Bucer's Strasbourg had some Reformed characteristics, but Germany remained firmly Lutheran and anti-Calvinist through 1560.

Following the death of Lutheran Wittenberg reformer Philipp Melanchthon in 1560, Frederick III, Elector Palatine began to promote the Reformed faith in his own realm. He invited two students of Calvin, Zacharias Ursinus and Kaspar Olevianus, to the university city of Heidelberg in 1561. The two men co-operated in writing the Heidelberg Catechism in 1563 to replace the conflicting catechisms then circulating in the realm. Despite opposition from the Holy Roman Emperor and other German princes, Frederick continued to institute Reformed worship in the Palatinate. In 1566 he was called to appear at the Diet of Augsburg to account for his violation of the Treaty of Augsburg. His testimony was so impressive that no action was taken against him, leaving the Palatinate free to continue in a Reformed direction. Frederick died in 1576 and was succeeded by his son Louis VI, who was not friendly to the Reformed faith. 600 Reformed professors and ministers were expelled. These refugees scattered to various cities. In 1583, John Casimir restored the Reformed faith in the Palatinate, and this policy was continued by his successor Frederick IV. Some other German states and cities also adopted the Heidelberg Catechism and the Reformed faith.

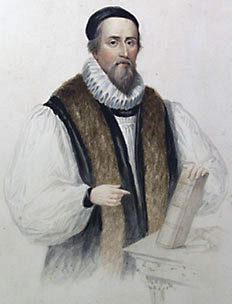
John Hooper's refusal to wear a surplice in the vestments controversy marks the birth of Puritanism.

Polish priests began instituting reforms influenced by Calvin starting in the 1550s. In 1556 a diet at Piotrków officially instituted several Protestant reforms. Jan Łaski returned to Poland and unsuccessfully attempted to unite the Reformed with the Polish Brethren and Lutherans. In 1575 King Stephen Báthory abandoned Protestantism, leading to the virtual extinction of the Polish Reformed Church. In Bohemia, Reformed ideas began to influence the Unity of the Brethren from the 1540s through Czech students at German and Swiss universities. Emperor Maximilian II tolerated Lutheran and Reformed worship in Bohemia through 1600, and many Bohemian nobles established Reformed worship on their estates. The influence of Calvinism in Swiss and German schools also affected Hungary and Transylvania, with the establishment of the Reformed Church of Hungary in 1576.

Reformed ideas influenced the English Reformation through Peter Martyr Vermigli, Martin Bucer, and Jan Łaski, with whom Archbishop Thomas Cranmer consulted during the reign of Edward VI. The vestments controversy beginning in 1550, in which John Hooper refused to wear a surplice, was the first manifestation of Puritanism. Puritans were characteristically more rigid on issues of worship (such as kneeling at communion) than some of their predecessors such as Calvin, Bucer, and Knox. On the succession of Mary I in 1553, Protestants were forced into exile, many of them in Geneva and Zurich. On the death of Mary and succession of Elizabeth I in 1558, many of these exiles returned and Reformed ideas continued to influence the direction of the Reformation. While doctrinally the Church of England during this time was generally Reformed in character, it retained an episcopal polity. Criticism of episcopacy took a number of forms, with some Reformed writers being more tolerant of it than others. An attempt to move the church towards presbyterian polity was put down around 1588.

== Seventeenth century ==
=== The Netherlands ===
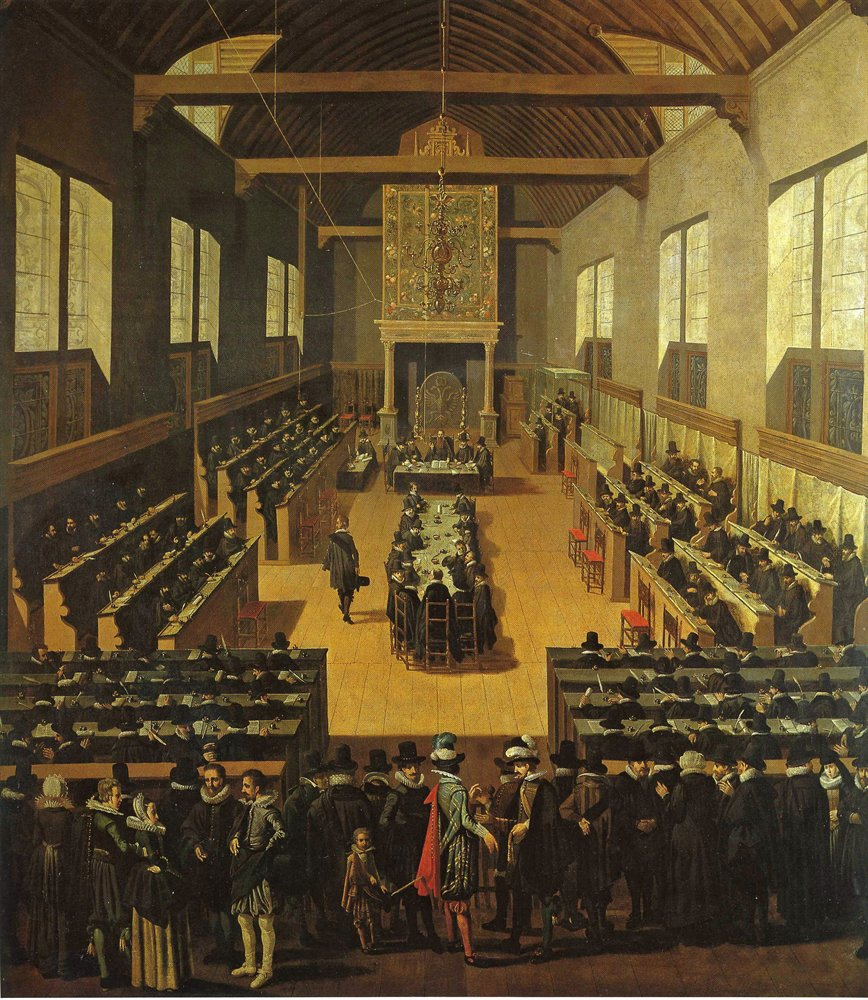
Synod of Dordt (1618–1619)

In 1603, the controversial Jacobus Arminius, who had questioned the established Calvinism of the Dutch Reformed Church was appointed as a professor of the University of Leiden. The move served to exacerbate tensions within the Reformed Church, including a heated period of debate between Arminius and fellow Leiden faculty member Franciscus Gomarus beginning 1604. Following the death of Arminius in 1609, a group of followers of Arminius, known as Remonstrants, published the Five Articles of Remonstrance. In 1618, the teachings came under scrutiny at the Synod of Dort. The resulting judgments, the Canons of Dort, issued in 1619, condemned the teachings. The Canons would also join the Belgic Confession and the Heidelberg Catechism as the third confessional standard of the Dutch Reformed Church. Between the beginning of the 17th century until 1750, the Dutch Reformed Church also went through the Nadere Reformatie, or "Further Reformation." This movement had been influenced in part by English Puritanism, and had Wilhelmus à Brakel and Gisbertus Voetius as prominent leaders.

=== South Africa ===
In 1652, the Dutch East India Company established a settlement at the Cape of Good Hope. Many settlers were members of the Dutch Reformed Church in the Netherlands, and in 1665, they received their first minister. Despite having their own consistory, the Nederduitse Gereformeerde Kerk was under the control of the Dutch Reformed Church in Amsterdam.

=== Germany ===
Calvinism gained support in Germany in 1604 when Maurice, Landgrave of Hesse-Kassel converted from Lutheranism. Unfortunately, his conversion prompted serious backlash against the Calvinists from the predominantly Lutheran population in Hesse. In 1613, the Calvinists gained another prominent convert, John Sigismund, Elector of Brandenburg. Eventually, Brandenburg would become a bi-confessional state, allowing for both Lutheranism and Calvinism, and the Electors of Brandenburg often advocated for their persecuted Calvinist brethren.

In 1618, the Thirty Years' War broke out, leading to a tumultuous time for the German Reformed. Invading Roman Catholics besieged Heidelberg in 1622, severely damaging the city and persecuting many Reformed believers. Five years later, in 1627, Maximilian I of Bavaria demanded the citizens of Heidelberg to convert to Roman Catholicism, yet they refused to do so, saying that they would rather forfeit their property than give up their Reformed faith. For decades following the end of the war, the Reformed enjoyed peace and stability. The Peace of Prague in 1635 had guaranteed legal recognition and protection for the Reformed. However, in 1685 the Calvinist, and childless, Charles II, Elector Palatine died, and was succeeded by the Catholic Philip William. Three years later, a dispute over the who was the legitimate ruler of the Palatinate prompted King Louis XIV of France to invade, leading to a wave of persecution of Protestants and the destruction of the city of Heidelberg. The Treaty of Ryswick put an end to violent persecution, yet, subsequent leaders put further pressure on the German Reformed.

=== Scandinavia ===
The Scandinavian countries of Denmark, Sweden and Norway had adopted Lutheranism early on, making it the official religion of their states. In 1667 however, the future King Christian V of Denmark married the staunchly Reformed Charlotte Amalie of Hesse-Kassel. As part of the marriage agreement, a Reformed minister was allowed to reside in Copenhagen as Charlotte's chaplain, but her Reformed faith prevented her from being crowned after becoming queen in 1670. In 1684, Christian V allowed for freedom of worship to non-Lutherans, and four years later, in 1688, the queen herself laid the cornerstone for the first Reformed church building. French Huguenots established the first and only Reformed body in Sweden in the late 18th century.

=== British Isles ===
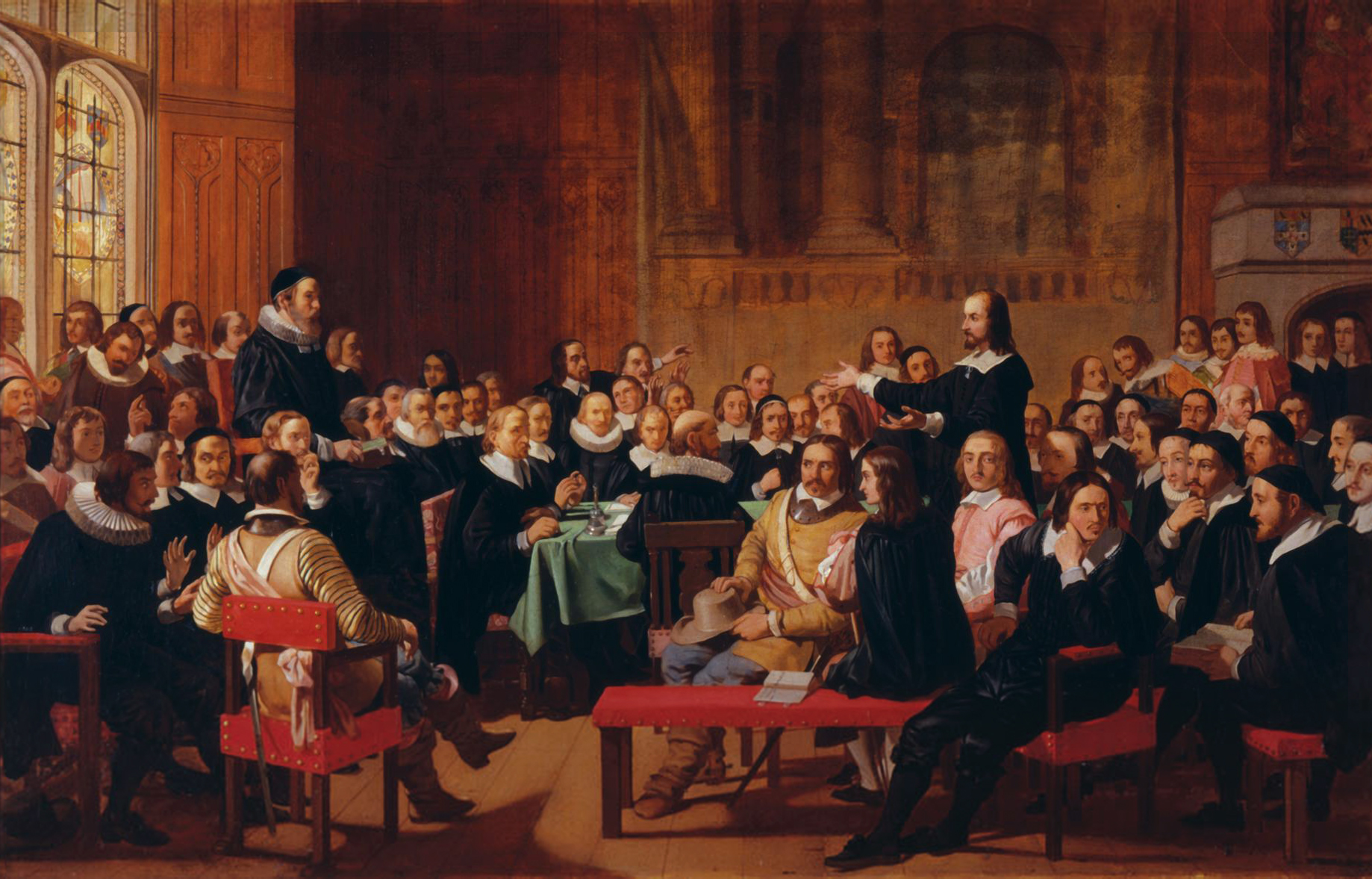
The Westminster Assembly

In the British Isles, there were three established churches, the Church of England, the Church of Scotland and the Church of Ireland. The Church of England had adopted the mildly Calvinistic Thirty-Nine Articles but the Queen in 1595 vetoed the more explicitly Calvinistic Lambeth Articles, both of which had been written in the second half of the 16th century. The Church of Scotland adhered to the Calvinistic Scots Confession, although Scots had been forced to somewhat compromise on their ecclesiology. In 1615, the Church of Ireland adopted the explicitly Calvinistic Irish Articles, which had largely been written by James Ussher, later Archbishop of Armagh. Also in Ireland, the settling of the Ulster Plantation on the northeast part of the island by some Scottish Presbyterians led to the establishment of the Presbyterian Church in Ireland.

==== The Westminster Assembly ====
In 1642, the English Civil War broke out between the Parliamentarians and the supporters of King Charles I. In 1643, Parliament, in exchange for the military support from Scottish Covenanters, convened the Westminster Assembly. What resulted from the assembly, which met between 1643 and 1649 were the Westminster Confession of Faith, the Larger & Shorter Catechisms, the Directory for the Public Worship of God and The Form of Presbyterian Church Government.

While they were intended to be binding on the entire nation, following the restoration of the monarchy in 1660, King Charles II openly supported the Church of England at the exclusion of the Presbyterians. In fact, it wasn't until the 1689 Act of Toleration, in the wake of the Glorious Revolution, that freedom of worship was established in England for non-Anglican Protestants. Nevertheless, the Westminster Confession & Catechisms replaced the Scots Confession as the subordinate standards for the Church of Scotland and are the confessional standards of most Presbyterians worldwide.

==== Independents and Baptists ====
In the second half of the 1630s, Calvinistic Baptists emerged. Eventually, in 1644, they published their own confession, the First London Baptist Confession, with a second edition being published two years later. Meanwhile, in 1653, Congregationalists, borrowing heavily from the Westminster Confession, wrote the Savoy Declaration. Baptists and Congregationalists, along with Presbyterians, faced persecution following the 1660 restoration of the monarchy and the passing of the Conventicle Act 1664. Following the Glorious Revolution, Calvinistic Baptists issued the Second London Baptist Confession of Faith.

== The second Reformation (1621–1650) ==
The second Reformation was given different names even in different parts of the English-speaking world. These include:

- Switzerland: The Reformation in Switzerland is often considered to have lasted through this time
- Scotland: Second Scottish Reformation (see also: Covenanters)
- England:
  - Puritan Awakening of the Puritans
  - Pilgrims
- Netherlands: Nadere Reformatie ("Further Reformation")

Some of the articles on the first Reformation also cover the second.

== Calvinism in the New World ==
In 1620, the Mayflower arrived at Plymouth with the Pilgrims. Most of them were of a Calvinistic separatist group known as the Brownists. Other Calvinistic Puritans settled in the nearby Massachusetts Bay Colony. Meanwhile, in 1628, an American branch of the Dutch Reformed Church was established by the Dutch colonists in the colony of New Netherland, a church which eventually would become the Reformed Church in America. Meanwhile, Roger Williams established a Baptist church in Providence, Rhode Island, which had been organized along Calvinist lines. In the 18th century, Calvinistic Baptists would found the Philadelphia Association, eventually adopting a modified version of the 1689 London Baptist Confession in 1742, renaming it the Philadelphia Confession.

Presbyterianism would be established in the colonies in 1703, with the establishment of the Presbytery of Philadelphia. In time, two other presbyteries would be formed, constituting a Synod in 1717. In 1729, the Presbyterians would formally adopt the Westminster Confession and Catechisms as their confessional standards. Scottish Churches under the auspices of their churches in the old country would also establish churches in the 18th century, with the Associate Presbytery being established by the Seceders in 1758 and the Covenanters founding the Reformed Presbytery in 1774. Many of the Seceders and Covenanters would merge in 1782 to form the Associate Reformed Presbyterian Church. Other Covenanters would form the Reformed Presbytery, which, in the wake of the "Old-Light/New Light" Controversy, would split into the Reformed Presbyterian Church in North America and the Reformed Presbyterian Church, General Synod. In 1789, the Presbyterians who had been formed in 1703 with the establishment of the first presbytery, formed the Presbyterian Church in the U.S.A.

== The First Great Awakening (1730s and 1740s) ==
- UK and USA: Just as with the Protestant Reformation, so also the First Great Awakening had its Calvinist branch, as can be seen from the lives of some in the Awakening Generation.
- Netherlands: Nadere Reformatie is also considered to have continued until this time

== The American Revolution ==
In view of Calvinism's theology of resistance to tyranny, which is inherent in earlier conflicts such as the St. Bartholomew's Day Massacre, the Dutch Revolution, and the English Civil War, British political commentators viewed the American Revolution as a "Presbyterian Rebellion."

== Neo-Calvinism ==
Around 1886

A version of Calvinism that has been adopted by both theological conservatives and liberals gained influence in the Dutch Reformed churches, late in the 19th century, dubbed "neo-Calvinism", which developed along lines of the theories of Dutch theologian, statesman and journalist, Abraham Kuyper.

== New Calvinism ==
Around the beginning of the 21st century, "new Calvinism" became influential in some evangelical circles, often blending Calvinist soteriology and more Charismatic views of the spiritual gifts. Influential leaders of the movement include John Piper, Mark Driscoll, Al Mohler and Matt Chandler.

== See also ==
- Calvinism
- Presbyterianism

== Bibliography ==
- Benedict, Philip (2002). Christ's Churches Purely Reformed. New Haven: Yale University Press. ISBN 978-0300105070.
- Muller, Richard A. (2004). "John Calvin and later Calvinism". In Bagchi, David; Steinmetz, David C (eds.). The Cambridge Companion to Reformation Theology. New York: Cambridge University Press. ISBN 978-0521776622.
- Stephens, W. Peter (2004). "The theology of Zwingli". In Bagchi, David V. N.; Steinmetz, David Curtis (eds.). The Cambridge Companion to Reformation Theology. Cambridge: Cambridge University Press. ISBN 0-521-77662-7.
- McNeill, John T. (1967). The History and Character of Calvinism. Oxford: Oxford University Press. ISBN 978-0195007435.
