= Johannes Hoornbeek =

Dutch Reformed theologian

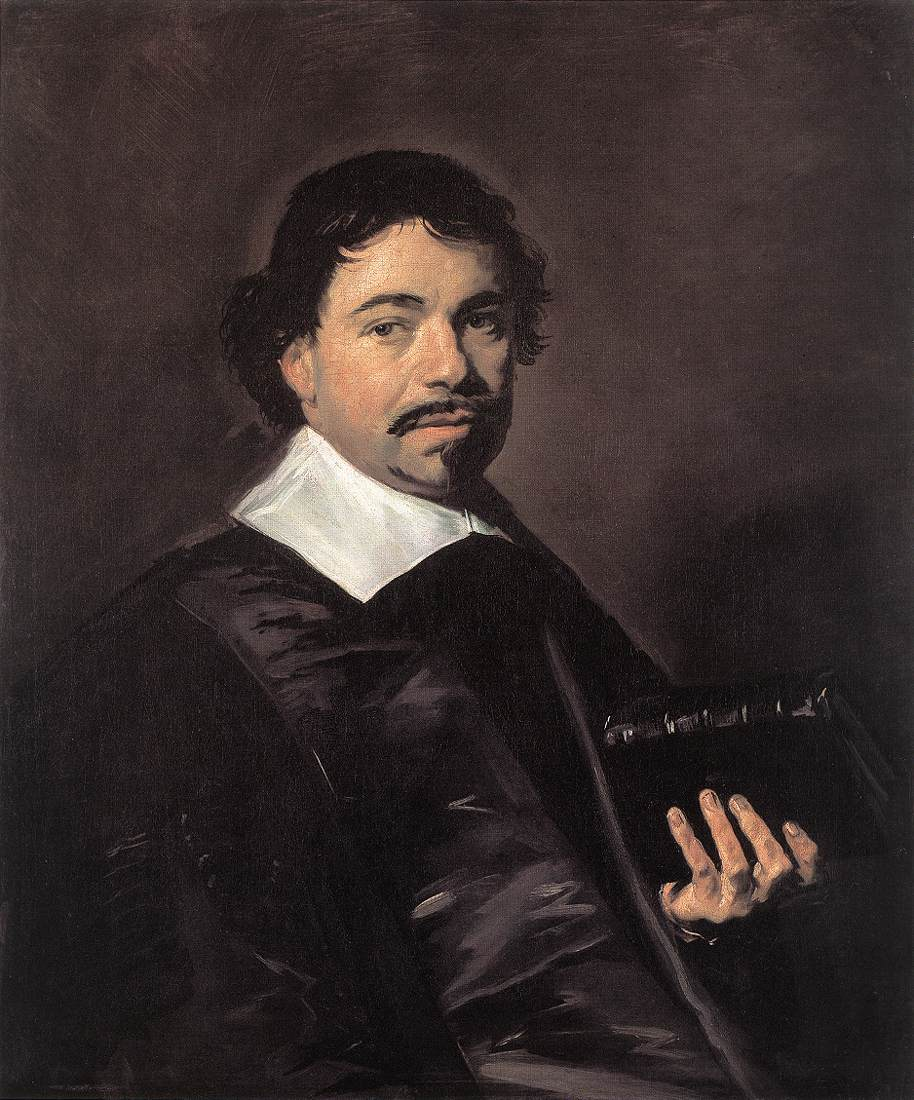
Portrait of Hoornbeeck by Frans Hals

Johannes Hoornbeek (4 November 1617, Haarlem – 23 August 1666, Leiden), was a Dutch Reformed theologian. He was a student and a follower of Gisbertus Voetius, writing with him on spiritual desertion. Like his teacher Voetieus, he was also later a professor of theology at the University of Leiden and University of Utrecht. The two universities were closely related in the 17th century, and both the teacher and his students participated in the intellectual "Utrecht Circle." Another member of the circle was Hornbeek's student colleague Andreas Essenius. The circle was also known as De Voetiaanse Kring (The Voetian Circle), and it was one of the most influential intellectual circles of the Dutch second Reformation.

== Works ==
Hoornbeck was a writer of polemical works. His many works include:

- De Conversione Indorum et Gentilum, libri duo (on the conversion of native populations of Asia and America)
- Pro Convincendis, et Convertendis Judaeis, libri octo (on the conversion of the Jews)

He attacked the Socinians, Mennonites, the Remonstrants and Cartesians. A collection of his polemical writing was the Summa Controversiarum Religionis; Cum Infidelibus, Hæreticis, Schismaticis: Id Est, Gentilibus, Judæis, Muhammedanis; Papistis, Anabaptistis, Enthusiastis et Libertinis, Socinianis; Remonstrantibus, Lutheranis, Brouvnistis, Græcis of 1653 (second edition, 1658). He also wrote "a fierce critique of Judaism in general and of the Kabbalah in particular," advocating the conversion of the Jews to the Dutch Calvinist/Reformed Church. The book Tesjubat Jehuda sive pro convicendis et convertendis Judaeis Libri Octo was published in Leiden in 1655.

He was painted by Frans Hals.
