= Andreas Essenius =

Dutch Reformed theologian, controversialist and academic

Andreas Essenius (February 1618–18 May 1677) was a Dutch Reformed theologian, controversialist and academic. He became professor of theology at the University of Utrecht.

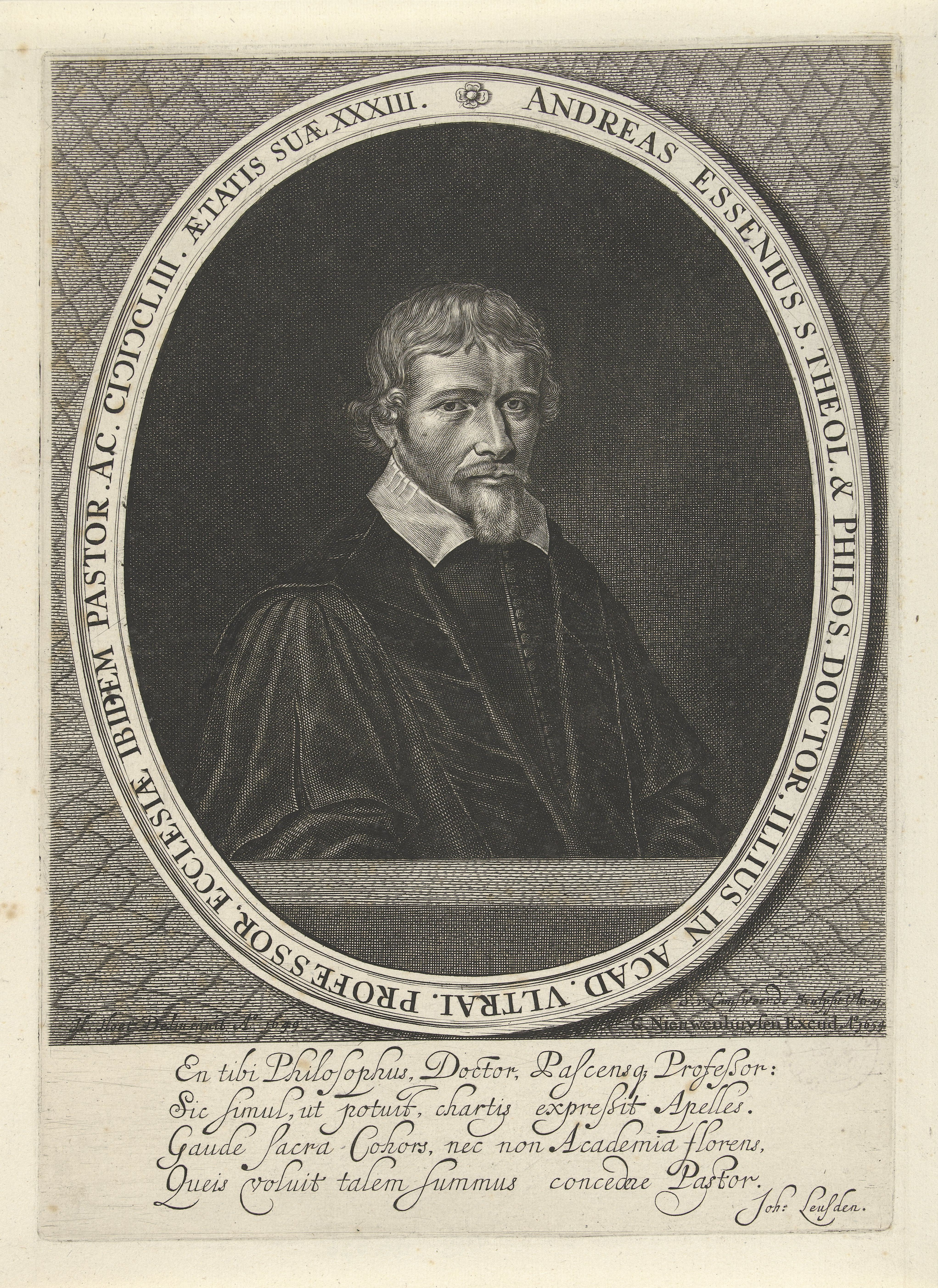
Andreas Essenius, 1654 engraving by Steven van Lamsweerde after H. Hoet.

== Life ==
He was born Andreas van Essen in Zaltbommel where he studied Latin and Greek. He went on to the Latin school in Utrecht and then to the University of Utrecht where he was a student of Bernardus Schotanus and Gisbertus Voetius. In 1640 he received his doctorate, and was appointed as a minister in the little town of Neerlangbroek.

On 19 February 1645 he became doctor of theology and started to write his first work (1649), against Socinianism. In 1651 he was appointed as minister in Utrecht and on 8 February 1653 he accepted appointment as professor of theology, with an oration De tractatione verbi Divini. In the academic year 1673-4 Essenius was rector magnificus of the University of Utrecht.

He was one of the Utrecht Circle, a Dutch second Reformation grouping around Anna Maria van Schurman, in the period when she was a close follower of Voetius. It included also the physician Johan Godschalk, Justus van den Bogaart, Theodore à Brakel, Cornelius Gentman, Johannes Hoornbeeck, Jodocus van Lodenstein, Johannes Teellinck, and Abraham van de Velde.

Wilhelmus à Brakel and Philipp van Limborch were amongst the students of Essenius.

Essenius died in Utrecht, still in post as professor, in 1677.

== Family ==
On 3 January 1640 he married Lucia Spruyt in the Jacobikerk in Utrecht. They had seven children.
