= Hendrik de Cock =

Dutch minister

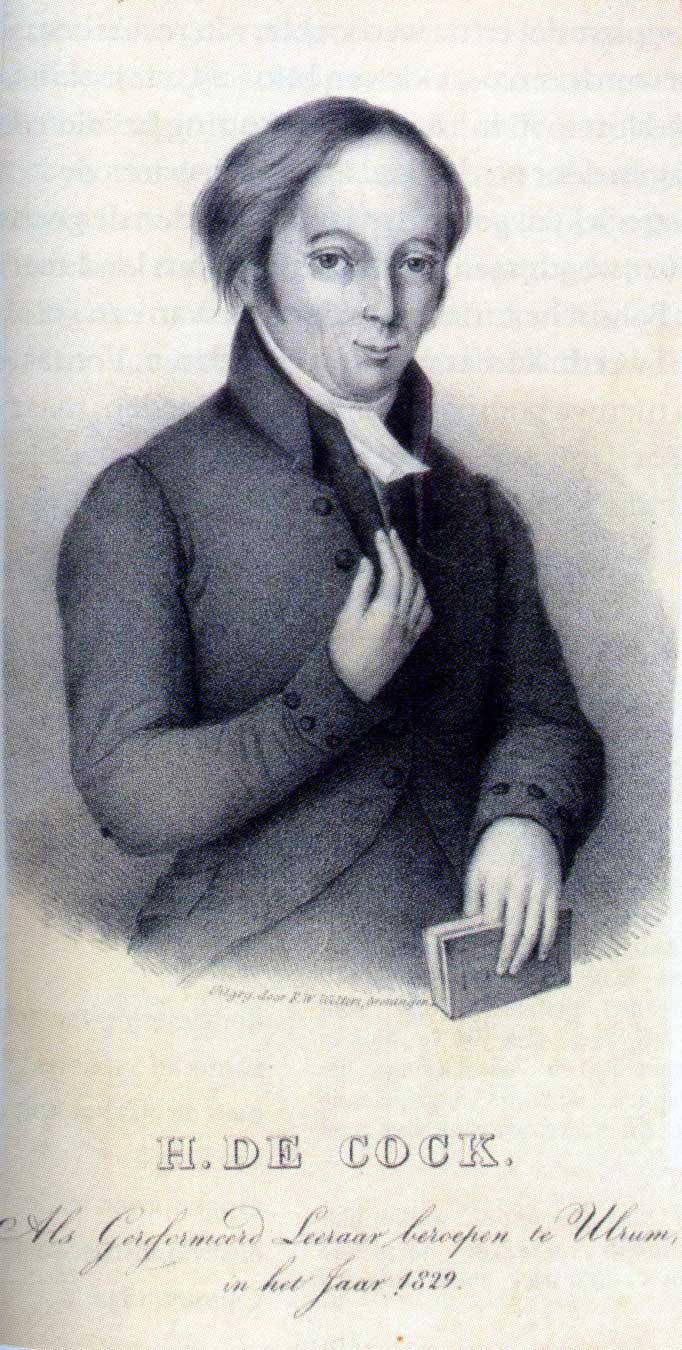
- Born: 12 April 1801
- Died: 14 November 1842 (aged 41)
- Occupation: Dutch Reformed minister

Hendrik de Cock (12 April 1801 – 14 November 1842) was a Dutch minister responsible for the 1834–35 Dutch Reformed Church split due to his incarceration and suspension from office for his Calvinist convictions.

Hendrik de Cock protested against the perceived theological liberalism in the Netherlands government-controlled Dutch Reformed Church in the 19th century. This protest led to the Secession (Afscheiding) of 1834. He is sometimes called the father of the Secession of 1834.

== Early life ==
Hendrik de Cock was born in the city of Veendam, Groningen, the Netherlands on 12 April 1801. His father was Regnerius Tjaarda de Cock and his mother was Jantje Kappen. His grandfather Regnerus Tjaarda de Cock was a minister in the Dutch Reformed Church around 1750.

His parents were associated with the Dutch Reformed Church. Shortly after de Cock's birth his family moved to Wildervank, Groningen. In 1824 he married Frouwe Venema (b 1803 - d 1889).

== Education ==
He entered into the University of Groningen to study to become a minister of theology; in 1823 he graduated from this university.

He was called to the congregation of Eppenhuizen, Groningen and (shortly after his marriage in 1824) was ordained there as a Minister. He would serve this congregation for three years until in 1827 he became Minister in Noordlaren, Groningen for two years.

== History ==
In 1829, Hendrik de Cock (who is also known as the father of the Secession) became minister of the Dutch Reformed Church in the town of Ulrum, near the city of Groningen. He was not evangelical but his congregation was. One of the members gave him the Canons of Dordt to read; this, plus his own discovery of John Calvin's Institutes of the Christian Religion, led to a great change in his preaching.

This change in his preaching attracted many people from other congregations to his worship services. Later these same people requested Hendrik de Cock to baptize their new babies. They could not, in good conscience have their babies baptized in their own churches, partly because the old Baptism Form had been replaced with, in their view, other heretical practices and liturgy, and partly because if the old Form was still used they could not answer "Yes" to the question whether they "believed the doctrine taught in their church was the truth of God's Word".

After careful consideration, consultation with his consistory and others, and through anxious prayer, De Cock did baptize these children. This infuriated the clergy from the other congregations, who in turn notified the authorities. It was, in fact, this issue that De Cock's colleagues brought in protest against him at Classis. In his defense he wrote a pamphlet defending what he and his consistory believed to be the truth. This sparked off much debate and as a result the Dutch Reformed Church suspended him as a minister on 13 December 1833.

in order to maintain law and order in the Reformed Church, to protect the name and honour of the ministers of the Gospel, and to prevent more disorders, divisions, and revolutions in several congregations in our Fatherland; . . . if preachers as DeCock were not halted in their reckless enterprise, this Board fears the worst.

Hendrik de Cock submitted to his suspension and stayed off his pulpit, but tensions continued to rise. They reached a kind of climax when Rev. Heinrich Scholte (later to settle and establish a colony in Pella, Iowa), who was known to be friendly to him, was forbidden to preach in Hendrik de Cock's church. In this way, a modernist could occupy the pulpit instead. The congregation did not take kindly to this and the police were called in to prevent what was a near riot.

Hendrik de Cock refused to recant, and finally, with his congregation, officially parted (seceded) on 13 October 1834 from the Dutch Reformed Church. The next day they signed the Act of Secession or Return (1834).

The first two years under de Cock saw the formation of over 200 churches that quickly developed out of local Bible studies called, "oefeningen," with a leader who served as the "oefenaar," that were meeting in homes. Here believers had been reading together from the "Old Writers" (17th century Further Reformation" pastors and theologians) who emphasized not only mindful apprehension of Reformed doctrine but also personal appropriation of these Calvinist truths.

Other churches also left the Dutch Reformed Church to join Hendrik de Cock in the Christian Reformed Churches in the Netherlands (CGKN). These churches and their members would be called the "Secessionists" or "Seceders".

== The Secession (Afscheiding) ==
The Dutch Reformed Church and the Dutch government made the Seceders suffer terribly for their convictions. Their meetings were often broken up by mob violence; they were fined and imprisoned. On 25 October 1834 a company of infantry (104 soldiers) were sent by the Dutch government to Ulrum and to other places where the Seceders had established separate congregations and were billeted in the homes of the seceders. These people were usually rather poor, which also why the other clergymen held them in contempt; yet they were forced to feed and shelter the soldiers, tend to their needs, and live their lives with the soldiers always present. The soldiers stayed there until the end of January 1835, and even then, half of them remained until 7 July 1835.

As a counter-measure to the Secession, the Dutch government reinstated an old French law from the time of Napoleon, that forbade any assembly of more than 20 people. This made it difficult, if not impossible, for the Seceders to gather to worship.

If any regulations imposed on them were broken, they were fined vast sums of money. If they were unable to pay the fines, their possessions were sold in Sheriff's sales and the proceeds paid to the government; if even this did not suffice, they would be imprisoned. De Cock was himself fined 150 florin (guilders) and spent three months in prison, separated from wife and family.

Not until under King William II in 1841 would this counter-measure and the religious persecution end.

== Later years ==
De Cock was passionate in his support of using Biblical psalms rather than later hymns and wrote at least one pamphlet on the subject.

In 1837 De Cock was called to the city of Groningen to be minister of the Reformed Church (Gereformeerde Kerk) there; he served this congregation until his death. He died from a lung disease at the age of 41, on 14 November 1842. He is buried in Groningen at the Southern Cemetery (Zuiderbegraafplaats) in a well marked (and maintained) grave. He was survived by his wife and five children, three of whom were very young. De Cock's grave stone was erected in 1891 (two years after his wife died) and renewed in 1911.

The known names of his children are Helenius de Cock (son), Eelbrina de Cock (daughter) and Jantje de Cock (daughter) (born 20 January 1836).

== Publications ==
- The friendly question from a circle of friends, answered from Damear
- Collected Writings
- A contribution to the right understanding of ecclesiastical separation

A number of his papers are held at Calvin University.

== See also ==
Albertus van Raalte
