= Hans van der Hellen =

Dutch printer

Hans van der Hellen (Latinized: Johannis Hellenij) was a Dutch printer in Middelburg, Zeeland, during the Dutch Golden Age.

Van der Hellen lived and worked in Zierikzee (from 1614 to 1617) and moved his printer's shop to Middelburg (which in the early seventeenth century was a flourishing center for the bookprinting industry) in 1617; at least in 1664 he was still working there, first in De Fransche Galey and then in 't Wapen van Audenaerde. He printed for local publishers as well as for publishers in Amsterdam, such as Maerten Jansz. Brandt and Jan Evertsen Cloppenburgh. Important works he printed include the first books by Jacob Cats (he printed an expensive version of Cats' first emblem book, Silenus Alcibiadis, sive Proteus (1618)) Johan de Brune's Emblemata of Zinne-werck, and a great number of publications by Willem Teellinck.
