= Emblemata of Zinne-werck =

1624 emblem book by Johan de Brune

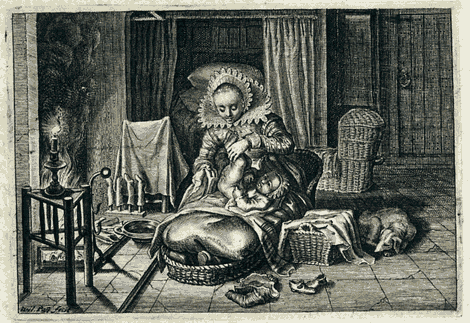
Illustration for vanity, no. 3.

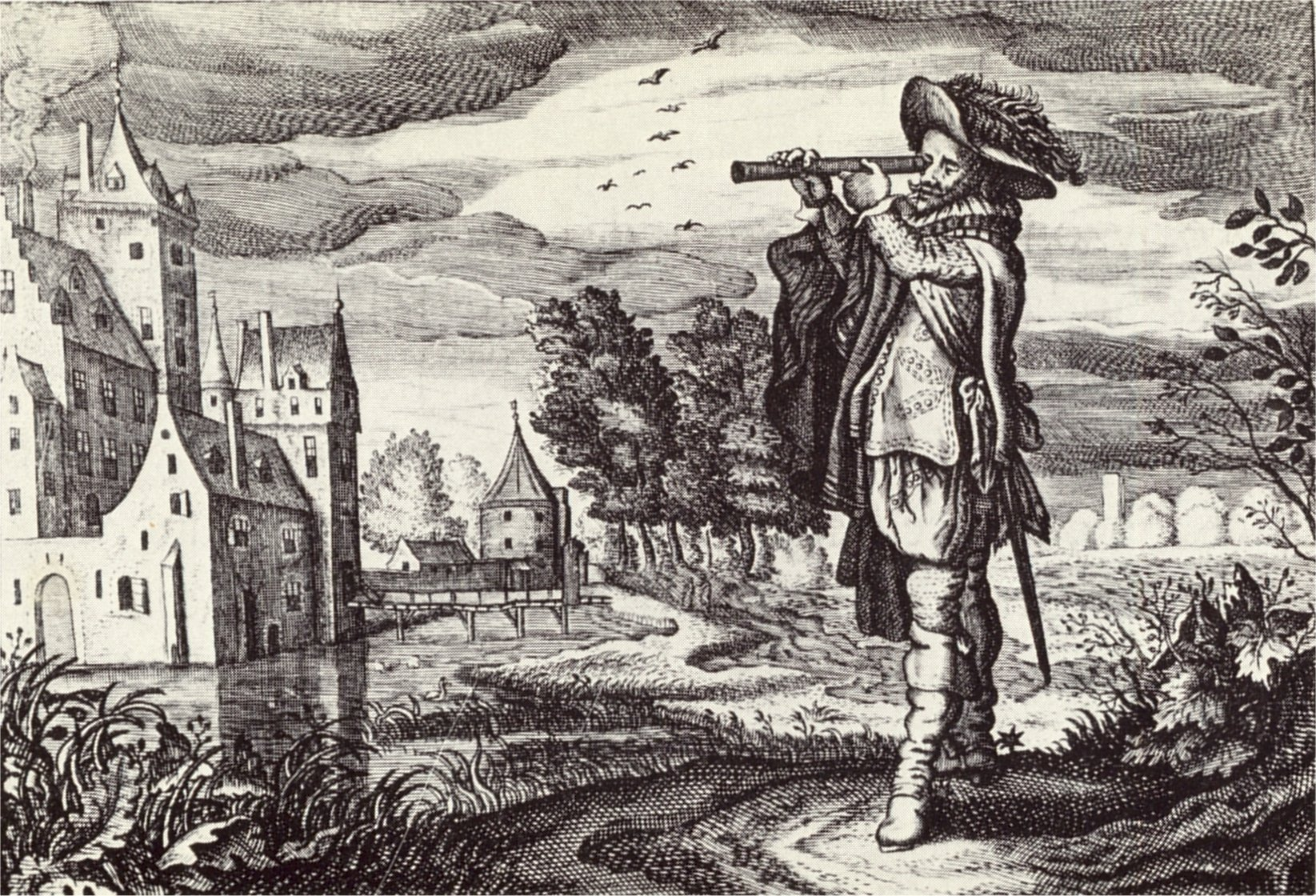
Engraving of man with telescope, no. 47.

The Emblemata of Zinne-werck is an emblem book, with text (in poetry and prose) by the Dutch poet Johan de Brune and engravings by Adriaen van de Venne. It was first published in Amsterdam in 1624 by Jan Evertsen Cloppenburgh and printed in Middelburg, Zeeland, by Hans van der Hellen. The (relatively expensive) book was printed in quarto size with copper engravings. A second edition, 1636, consisted of the unsold remains of the first edition (of which probably around 1,000 copies were printed) with minor changes in the first gathering and added gatherings at the end.

== Content ==
Each of the 51 entries has a caption of one or two lines indicating the moral, followed by an engraving and an epigram (rhyming in couplets). This set of elements is followed by a prose explanation of varying length (up to 12 pages). That there are prose explanations in the first place (and that some of them are so lengthy) could be, argues Els Stronks, because Brune had doubts about the use of images; he considered images to be ambiguous where text was stable and "has a greater potential than the visual arts". Stronks argues that this was characteristic of the attitudes of the Dutch Reformed Church of the time.

=== Individual emblems ===
Brune's emblems partake of different traditions, including that of the ambiguous status of secular imagery in the Dutch Reformed Church and the generally moralizing stance of many bourgeois writers of the Dutch Golden Age. Different images have been interpreted differently by scholars, depending on among other factors the perceived relations between Brune and his audience, and between Brune and the broader pictorial tradition of the time. By the same token, a particular pictorial element may carry a completely different meaning if used in a different context in a different artwork even from the same period. The following are brief notes on individual emblems based on discussions thereof in academic publications.

3, portraying Vanitas, depicts no direct image of vanity but takes a contrary approach, featuring a well-dressed upper-class women holding a child who's just loaded his diaper--"the child's bottom, ready for wiping, is thrust directly into the viewer's face".

7 is a very realistic depiction of a large cheese cut in half, with maggots crawling all over. The emblem's motto is Al te scherp maeckt schaerdigh, "too much sharpness will maim". The epigram elaborates on the theme of flaws and perfection, "that which most excels frequently has the most flaws". While the motto derives from a common belief, that sharpening a knife too often will make it chip easily, no imagery of sharpening or knives occurs in the image. Interpreting the cheese becomes possible only in context: cheese comes from a then poorly understood process of coagulation possibly pointing to "monstrous powers" within the matter. It was believed, for instance, that maggots were born spontaneously in cheese, and that (especially older) cheese was a suspicious food item, possibly causing constipation and other physical ailments: it is food and putrefaction simultaneously.

19 shows a pretzel being tugged from both sides by hands coming from clouds, emblematizing how the soul is pulled by God and the devil. The image of the pretzel is found elsewhere in art from the same period, with the attendant possibility of "pictorial homonymy"—but the pretzel in Jan van Bijlert's Merry company points not at the transience of man's life but at women's wiles.

42 shows a man seeking shelter from the rain under a tree (a fitting emblem given the "volatile Dutch weather") to "convey the idea that life's inevitable tempests or misfortunes are transient and survivable, if one stands firm or prudently takes shelter", shelter being provided by the Prince, according to the accompanying epigram.
