= Simon Oomius =

Dutch theologian

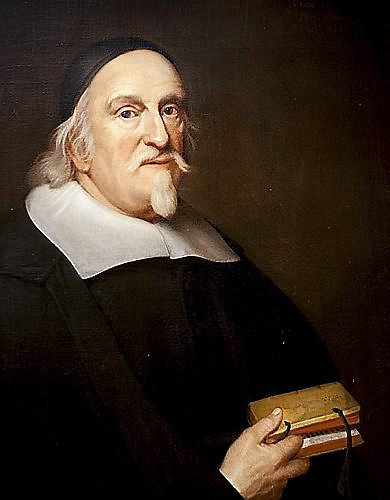
Simon Oomius

Simon Oomius or Ooms (1 March 1630 – 25 November 1706) was a Dutch reformed minister and theologian. He played an important role in the Nadere Reformatie.

He was born on 1 March 1630 in the village of Heenvliet, on the island of Voorne-Putten. He was the youngest of the twenty-one children of Cornelis Oomius, a preacher in Heenvliet and a native of Turnhout.

He studied theology and philosophy, as well as oriental languages, in Utrecht and Leiden, and then started his ministry in Purmerland in 1654. In 1674 he obtained is doctorate degree in Hardewijk.

He was one of the most prolific authors of his day, publishing a total of 41 works between 1650 and 1707. For Oomius, a theology beginning and ending with speculation was useless, while the ultimate end of theology ought to be praxis. Thus, according to Oomius, "the object of theology subsumes the realms of this life," which he divided in four: domestic, moral, political or civil, and legal.

His dogmatic magnum opus was Instutiones theologiae practicae. Among his other works is the first earnest Dutch-language research on Islam.
