= Jacques Dinet =

French Jesuit

Jacques Dinet (1584-1653) was a French Jesuit, confessor to Louis XIII and an associate of René Descartes.

== Life ==
He was born at Moulins, nephew of Gaspard Dinet who was bishop of Mâcon.

He knew Descartes from La Flèche, where for some of the time he supervised Descartes's studies as principal prefect. Later, Descartes found him sympathetic enough to use as a sounding board, and potential intermediary with Pierre Bourdin, another Jesuit and critic of the Dioptrics. A letter to Dinet in 1642 attacked both Bourdin and Gisbertus Voetius, an opponent at the University of Utrecht. The letter also set out his position in relation to scholastic philosophy. By including it in the second edition of his Meditations on First Philosophy, Descartes raised the stakes in these fights. At that time Dinet was in a position of influence, as Jesuit provincial in Paris, for the Île-de-France.

In 1643 Dinet took over from Jacques Sirmond the position of confessor to the dying Louis XIII. In 1653 he was also briefly confessor to Louis XIV. His account of the death of Louis XIII was later edited for publication by Antoine Girard, appearing as L'Idée d'une belle mort (1656).
