= 1834 Dutch Reformed Church split =

The 1834 Dutch Reformed Church split, or the Secession of 1834 (Dutch: Afscheiding van 1834), known simply as Afscheiding ("Separation, Secession, Split"), refers to a split that occurred within the Dutch Reformed Church in 1834. The federation of churches resulting from the split, the Christian Reformed Churches, still exists in the Netherlands. The Free Reformed Churches are the North American counterpart.

== Leading up to Secession ==
The Secession of 1834 began in Ulrum, a town in the north of the Dutch province of Groningen. Before the secession, their pastor, Reverend Hendrik de Cock had been forbidden by the government to preach and had orders not to warn people against what he believed to be the erroneous teachings of some of his colleagues. Hendrik, along with other ministers, publicly opposed some of the heresies that were being tolerated by the churches. They also rejected the introduction of new hymns into worship in place of the use of the Psalms. He was also forbidden to baptize the children of believers who had refused to have their children baptized by their own ministers, whom they believed to be unsound in the faith.

== Outcome ==
On 14 October 1834, a large majority of the congregation of the Dutch Reformed Church in Ulrum, signed the Act of Secession and Return" and broke away from the State Church.

Following the Secession in the Netherlands, many members experienced social contempt and economic hardship. In response, ministers such as Albertus C. Van Raalte and Hendrik Scholte encouraged organized emigration to the United States in order to preserve religious life under their own leadership. Between 1844 and 1857, nearly ten percent of the Seceders emigrated, establishing communities in New York and western Michigan.

Although many of these immigrants initially affiliated with the Reformed Church in America, tensions developed over worship practices and doctrine, including the use of hymns, open communion, and catechetical instruction. In 1857, four congregations withdrew to form the Christian Reformed Church in North America. This division became known as the 1857 Dutch Reformed Church split.

== See also ==
- 1857 Dutch Reformed Church split
- 1886 Dutch Reformed Church split
