= Martin Schoock =

Martin Schoock (1 April 1614–1669) was a Dutch academic and polymath.

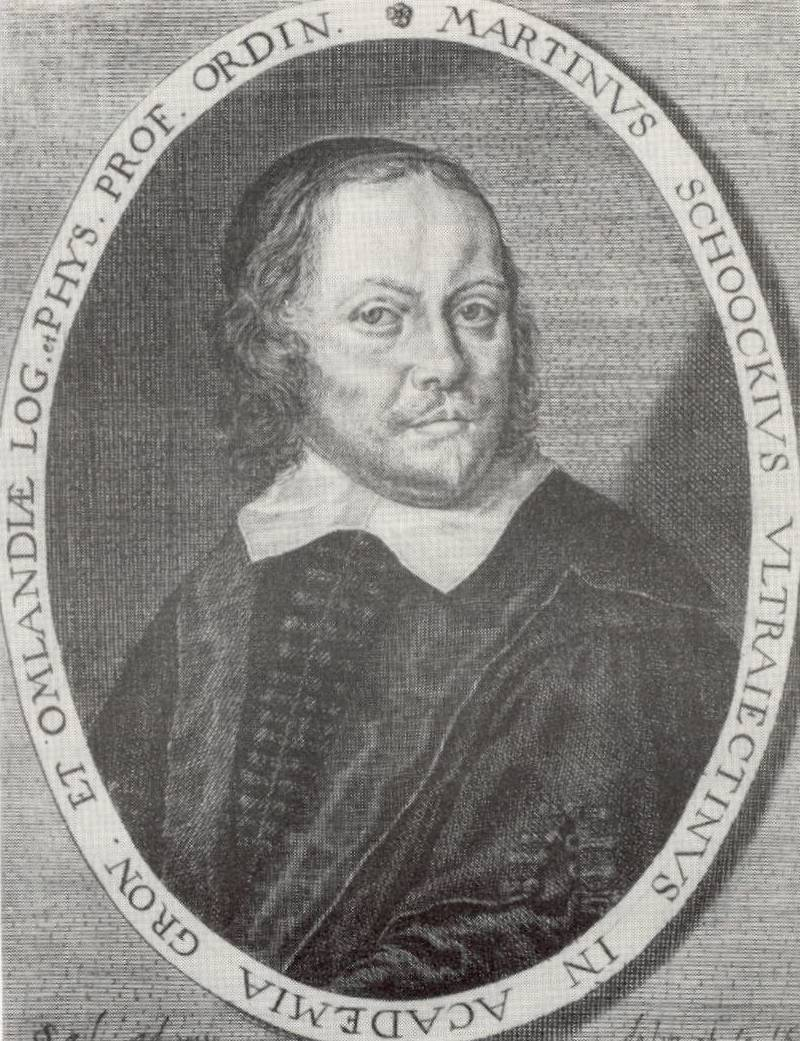
Martin Schoock, engraving by Steven van Lamsweerde.

== Life ==
He was born in Utrecht. His grandfather Anton van Voorst taught him Latin. His parents were Remonstrants and intended him for the law; he studied theology and philosophy from 1632 in Leiden under Antonius Walaeus. As a student of Gisbertus Voetius he acquired a doctorate in philosophy around 1636.

About 1638 he became professor in classical literature, rhetoric and history at the University of Deventer, and then in 1640 in the University of Groningen professor in logic and physics. Schoock was combative and brought difficulties on himself. Descartes at one point felt Schoock had libeled him and complained to the French ambassador. Schoock was arrested and spent two days in jail. He exonerated himself by in effect proving that Voetius had put him up to it, citing letters from his former professor.

After the death of his first wife, Angelica van Merck, with whom he had seven sons and a daughter, he came into money troubles. He made a second marriage with a rich widow.

At the end of his life Schoock left Groningen. He became official historian of the Elector of Brandenburg, and Professor at the University of Frankfurt-on-Oder, where he died.

== Works ==
Schoock published about 50 works. In the 1642–43 controversy between René Descartes and Voetius, Schoock attacked Descartes and his philosophy fiercely in his Admiranda methodus novae philosophiae Renati De Cartes; he stated later that Voetius had been a major author of the book.

He published in 1664 two works on dairy products: Tractus de Butyro (on butter), the first such publication; and Accessit ejusdem Diatriba de aversatione casei (on the dislike of cheese).

Another of his books was The Chicken and the Egg.
