= Willem van Asselt =

Dutch theologian

Willem J. van Asselt (30 April 1946, Slijk-Ewijk – 29 May 2014) was a Dutch professor of historical theology and minister in the Dutch Reformed Church.

He studied theology at the University of Utrecht, where he received a doctorate in 1988. He chaired the Classic Reformed Theology Workgroup at Utrecht from 1990 until his death. He became docent at Utrecht in 1993. He was appointed professor doctor in historical theology at ETF Leuven in 2008, where he founded the Institute of Post-Reformation Studies.

A festschrift, Scholasticism Reformed, was published in his honor in 2010. Contributors included Carl Trueman and Richard Muller.
