= Jan Evertsen Cloppenburgh =

Dutch publisher

Jan Evertsen Cloppenburgh Jr (1571–1648) was a Dutch publisher active in Amsterdam during the Dutch Golden Age.

Cloppenburgh was born in Ruinen, Drenthe, but he was already in 1589 working as a bookbinder in Amsterdam, where he married Annetje Pieters in 1597. He had an older brother with the same name (hence "Jr.") who became a publisher in Deventer. Cloppenburgh published many works, mostly of strict Reformed nature, including Johan de Brune's Emblemata of Zinne-werck. He was buried in the Oude Kerk, Amsterdam on 3 October 1648.
