= Helenius de Cock =

Dutch theologian

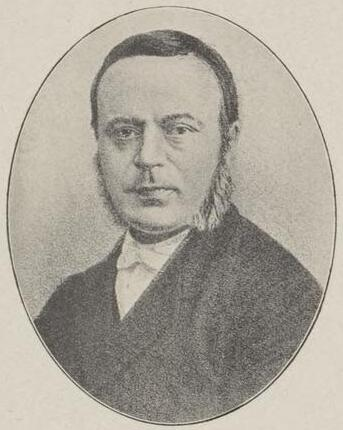
Helenius de Cock

Helenius de Cock (1 November 1824, Eppenhuizen – 2 January 1894) was an instructor at the Theological School in Kampen, Overijssel, the Netherlands.

He was the son of Hendrik de Cock and Frouwe Venema.

De Cock was pastor in Nieuwe Pekela from 1844 to 1845.
