= 1886 Dutch Reformed Church split =

The 1886 Dutch Reformed Church split, also known as the Doleantie (from Latin dolere, 'to feel sorrow'), was the name of a prominent schism in the Dutch Reformed Church (Nederlands Hervormde Kerk) that took place in 1886 and was led by a renowned minister, Abraham Kuyper. The Doleantie was not the first schism in the Dutch Reformed Church. Another schism, the Secession of 1834 (Afscheiding van 1834), had led to the formation of the Christian Reformed Church in the Netherlands (Dutch: Christelijke Gereformeerde Kerk in Nederland).

In 1885, the first moves towards schism were made when Kuyper and his supporters issued a formal complaint about liberalising practices in the Dutch Reformed Church. Their complaint never won broad support within the church, and in the winter of 1885-1886, the call for schism grew stronger amongst a large number of conservative congregations, most of which were located in the Veluwe area and elsewhere in what is now called the Dutch Bible Belt.

The first congregation to secede was Kootwijk, which on 7 February 1886 appointed a minister who had been trained at the Free University of Amsterdam without waiting for permission of its classis. The following, day the congregation in Voorthuizen followed suit.

The seceded congregations united in the Low German Reformed Church (Dolerende) (Dutch: Nederduits Gereformeerde Kerk (Dolerende)). Nederduits Gereformeerde Kerk had been the official name of the Dutch Reformed Church until 1816. With that name, the seceded churches wanted to show that they thought of themselves as the legitimate continuation of that church, which had been highly prominent in the Dutch Republic. The suffix (Dolerende), meaning 'those who feel sorrow', was added to show their disapproval with the Dutch Reformed Church.

Later in 1886, Kuyper and his supporters occupied the New Church in Amsterdam, the seat of the governing body of the Reformed Church, to force a settlement in the conflict over church property that had followed the Doleantie. In July 1886, the dolerenden had to accept a verdict against them.

In 1892, the Nederduits Gereformeerde Kerken (Dolerende) merged with the Christian Reformed Church in the Netherlands to form the Reformed Churches in the Netherlands.

== See also ==
- 1834 Dutch Reformed Church split
- 1857 Dutch Reformed Church split
