= Wilhelmus à Brakel =

Dutch theologian (1635–1711)

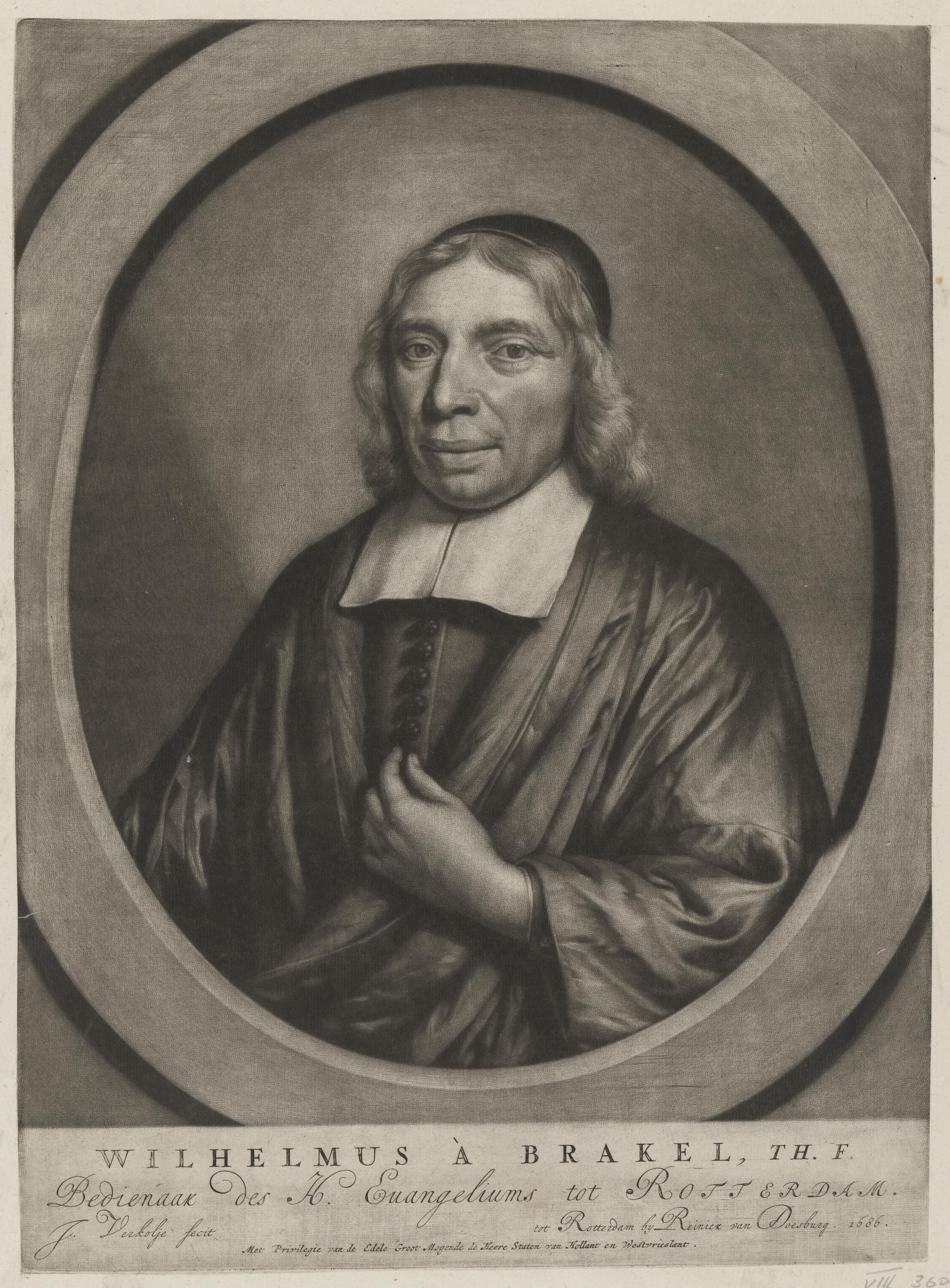
- Born: 2 January 1635; Leeuwarden, Spanish Netherlands
- Died: 30 October 1711 (aged 76); Rotterdam, Spanish Netherlands
- Occupations: Theologian, author, Minister (Christianity)
- Notable work: The Christian's Reasonable Service
- Theological work
- Tradition or movement: Further Reformation

Wilhelmus à Brakel (Dutch pronunciation: [ʋɪlˈɦɛlmʏs aː ˈbraːkəl]; 2 January 1635 – 30 October 1711), also known as "Father Brakel", was a Reformed minister and theologian in the Netherlands. He was a contemporary of Gisbertus Voetius and Hermann Witsius and a major representative of the Dutch Further Reformation (known in Dutch as De Nadere Reformatie).

== Early life ==
Wilhelmus à Brakel was born on January 2, 1635, in Leeuwarden, Friesland, Netherlands. He was the only living child of a preacher, Theodorus à Brakel, and his wife Margaretha Homma.

He attended the Latin school in Leeuwarden and became a committed Christian at an early age. In 1659 he was declared a candidate for the ministry and he was ordained in 1662, after completing his studies at the University of Utrecht under theologians Gisbertus Voetius and Andreas Essenius.

== Preaching career ==
His first church was in Exmorra, Friesland and he worked there for three years. During this time he married Sara Nevius from Zoelen. In 1665 they moved to Stavoren, and then moved again to Harlingen in 1670. In 1673 they moved to Leeuwarden, where they stayed for 10 years.

In 1683, he accepted the call to work in Rotterdam and served there until his death in 1711.

== The further reformation ==
À Brakel was best known for his work with the Further Reformation, which was contemporaneous with and greatly influenced by English Puritanism. Scholars in the Netherlands have defined this movement as follows:

The Dutch Second Reformation is that movement within the Dutch Reformed Church during the seventeenth and eighteenth centuries, which as a reaction to the declension or absence of living faith, made both the personal experience of faith and godliness matters of central importance. From that perspective, the movement formulated substantial and procedural reformation initiatives, submitting them to the proper ecclesiastical, political, and social agencies, or, in conformity, pursued in both word and deed a further reformation of the church, society, and state.

— Godefridus Udemans, The Practice of Faith, Hope and Love

À Brakel and his ministry functioned at the approximate center of this Pietistic movement, both historically and theologically. Beginning in 1606 with the ministry of his father, Willem Teellinck of the Further Reformation, and ending in 1784 with the death of Theodorus Vander Groe, à Brakel's ministry, particularly his most important pastorate in Rotterdam from 1683 to 1711, falls in the middle of the timeline. His ministry represented a balance of the Further Reformation relative to both its early and concluding stages.

=== The Christian's Reasonable Service ===
À Brakel's prominence as a major representative of this movement is largely due to his magnum opus, The Christian's Reasonable Service. After its initial publication in 1700, his four-volume work was soon recognized as a monumental contribution to the literature of the Further Reformation. It was seen as a synthesis of the best Puritan literature published in England and the Netherlands. Further Reformation scholar F. Earnest Stoeffler stated, “He supplied Reformed Pietism with a theological textbook which came out of a tradition wholly native to the Netherlands. He preserved the balance between the mystical and ethical elements in Christianity which is so characteristic of the great Pietists in the Reformed communion.”

For more than three centuries, the influence of The Christian's Reasonable Service has been such that à Brakel continues to be one of the most significant representatives of the Further Reformation. À Brakel is referred to as “Father Brakel”, a title by which he is still known in the Netherlands. Since its publication in English, his reputation has grown among scholars and followers of Puritan literature.

À Brakel's work was particularly distinguished for going beyond the systematic theology found at the time. The title indicated that it was not his intention to present a systematic explanation of Christian dogma to the public. In directly quoting the Bible for his title he indicated to Christians that it is entirely reasonable for a man to quote the Bible to show belief and following of the book. The title also conveyed that God asks men to serve him in spirit and truth, doing so in a reasonable manner.

À Brakel wrote this work for church members rather than for theologians, though he hoped that theologians could benefit from it as well. To accomplish this, he ensured that the book contained a practical application of doctrine. In his writing, he hoped that the principles he expounded could become an experiential reality to those who read his work. He established the crucial relationship between objective beliefs and the subjective experience of those beliefs.

Experiential theology explains how the doctrines of the Bible become a reality in the hearts and lives of believers. Religious experiences are seen as bringing religious beliefs from text into subjective involvement. In the theological sections of his chapters, he laid the groundwork for experiential application by describing what the experiential application of the expounded doctrine should be and what it often is.

== Controversies ==
While working in Leeuwarden, his plans to organize house services or conventicles met with opposition from his consistory which was fearful of the formation of churches within the church. Instead, he conducted a public catechism.

He also came in conflict with his consistory and the governing officials of Friesland when he permitted his exiled fellow minister, Jacobus Koelman, to preach in his pulpit. When Friesland attempted to forbid him to preach, à Brakel stood his ground and challenged the government’s right to interfere in the running of the church. à Brakel won this public argument.

He took several public stands against what he saw as unorthodox theology. He stood against Rev. David Flud Van Giffen and his Cocceian views concerning the interpretation of the Old Testament, as well as any manifestation of Erastian church government. In particular he took a strong stand against the teachings and practices of the converted French Jesuit, Jean de Labadie, who was a strong proponent of a pure church consisting only of true believers, to which he joined a unique unbiblical mysticism.

== Death ==
On August 30, 1711, à Brakel preached his last sermon. He had to sit down several times during the service. He died later that evening.

== Works ==
- Brakel, Wilhelmus à. The Christian's Reasonable Service. 4 vols. Translated by Bartel Elshout. Grand Rapids, Michigan - Reformation Heritage Books.
- Brakel, Wilhelmus à. Commentary on Revelation in the Appendix of The Christian's Reasonable Service . 1 vol. Translated by Historicism Research Foundation.
