= Jan Rohls =

German theologian (born 1949)

Jan Rohls (born December 17, 1949, in Gronau, North Rhine-Westphalia) is a German theologian and retired university professor. He served as dean of the Protestant Theological Faculty of LMU Munich from 1999 to 2003.
