= Willem Teellinck =

Dutch pastor

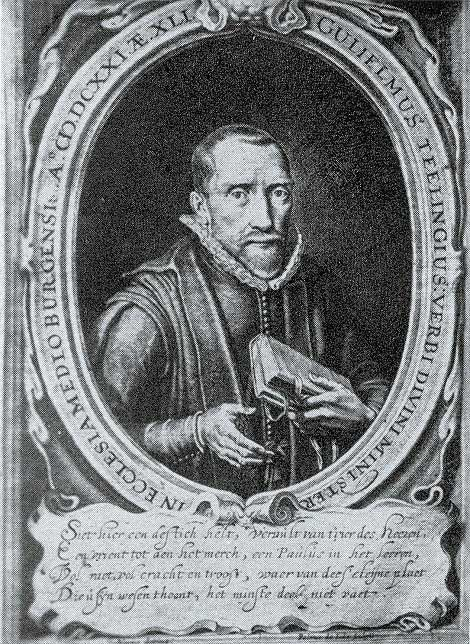
Willem Teellinck

Willem Teellinck (4 January 1579, Zierikzee – 8 April 1629, Middelburg) was an influential Dutch pastor during the Further Reformation in the Netherlands.

== Biography ==
Willem was born to Joost Teellinck, a mayor of Zierikzee, and Johanna de Jonge in 1579. His father died when he was 15. Willem received an excellent education. He studied at the University of St. Andrews in Scotland, and then received a doctorate from the University of Poitiers in France. He then lived among the Puritans in England for a time. It was at this time that he became a Calvinist. In England Willem met Martha Greendon. She was a Puritan woman, and the two were married. It was while in England that Willem also decided to become a minister and give up the pursuit of law. Dutch church historians tend to think of Willem, and perhaps his brother Eewout, as giving the original impulse to Precicianism as a movement.

== Ministry ==
Willem studied theology at the University of Leiden under both Franciscus Gomarus and Jacob Arminius. At first he tried to stay neutral in the controversy although he personally was a Gomarist. Teellinck was ordained in 1606 and began serving a parish in Duiveland. Teellinck stayed in contact with his English Puritan friends, especially John Dod, Arthur Hildersham, and Thomas Taylor. Teellinck brought the English Puritanism to his ministry in the Netherlands. He stressed repentance, practical godliness, and willing to address current events in his sermons. In 1612, he was sent by his Classis to the Hague to have the government call a National Synod to resolve the growing conflict between Calvinism and Arminianism. This would eventually result in the Synod of Dort.

In 1613 Willem Teellinck took a call to the pastorate in Middelburg. He served here until his death in 1629. The church grew under his leadership, and he gained quite a reputation as a very godly minister, even going as far to continually visit the sick even during an outbreak of pestilence and plague. At the age of 50, Willem Teellinck died. Thousands mourned his death.

== Works ==
Teellinck wrote at least 127 manuscripts, including 20 full-length books (many of his books were printed by Middelburg printer Hans van der Hellen), although not all were printed and some were printed after his death. His first work was published in 1608, and was entitled The Love of the Fatherland. It was about the need of the government to enact laws to help restrain sin. Most of his works, however, dealt more with personal piety or exegesis of the Bible. This includes his longest work, The Key of Devotion, which is about 800 pages. However, Teellinck did also write works against the Roman Catholic Church and Arminianism. His book The Path of True Godliness was translated into English in 2003.

== Sources ==
- Introduction to the Path of True Godliness, edited by Joel Beeke
