= Gisbertus Voetius =

Dutch theologian

The Reverend Gisbertus Voetius
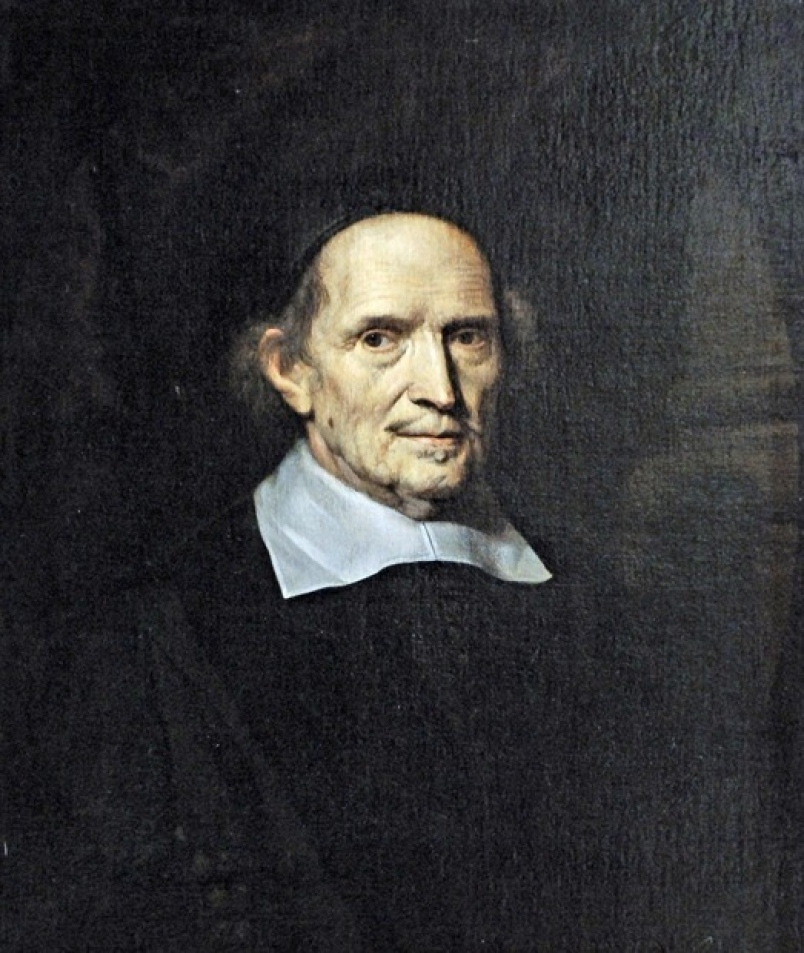
- Gisbertus Voetius by Nicolaes Maes, 1670s
- Born: Gijsbert Voet; 3 March 1589; Heusden, Dutch Republic
- Died: 1 November 1676 (aged 87); Catharijnekerk, Utrecht, Dutch Republic
- Resting place: Catharijnekerk, Utrecht
- Education: Leiden University
- Occupations: Theologian; pastor; professor
- Known for: Voetian theology
- Notable work: Politica Ecclesiastica (4 vols., 1663–76); Diatriba de Theologia (1668)
- Spouse: Deliana van Diest
- Theological work
- Tradition or movement: Dutch Reformed; Nadere Reformatie

Gisbertus Voetius (Latinized version of the Dutch name Gijsbert Voet [ˈɣɛizbərt ˈfut]; 3 March 1589 – 1 November 1676) was a Dutch Calvinist theologian, pastor, and professor.

== Life ==
He was born at Heusden, in the Dutch Republic, studied at Leiden, and in 1611 became Protestant pastor of Vlijmen, whence in 1617 he returned to Heusden. In 1619, he played an influential part in the Synod of Dort, at which he was the youngest delegate. In 1634, Voetius was made professor of theology and Oriental science at the University of Utrecht. Three years later he became pastor of the Utrecht congregation. He was an advocate of a strong form of Calvinism (Gomarism) against the Arminians. The city of Utrecht perpetuated his memory by giving his name to the street in which he had lived.

== Utrecht controversy with Descartes ==
In March 1642, while serving as rector of the University of Utrecht, Voetius persuaded the university's academic senate to issue a formal condemnation of the Cartesian philosophy and its local defender, Henricus Regius. According to the senate's statement, Cartesian philosophy was to be suppressed because:

1. it was opposed to 'traditional' (i.e. Scholastic/Aristotelian) philosophy;
2. young people taught Cartesian philosophy would be unable to understand the technical terminology of Scholasticism; and
3. it had consequences contrary to orthodox theology.

Descartes countered with a personal attack on Voetius, in a letter to Jacques Dinet, which he made public in the second edition (1642) of his Meditations. Voetius was provoked into getting Martin Schoock to produce a book-length assault on Descartes and his work, the Admiranda methodus (1643). Descartes associated the quarrel with the part Voetius was playing with another controversy with Samuel Maresius, who was at least sympathetic to some Cartesian ideas. Legal and diplomatic moves followed (the protagonists were in different provinces in the Netherlands); and Maresius at the University of Groningen was able to extract some admissions from Schoock that were quite damaging to Voetius.

In his long letter to Voetius (Epistola ad Voetium), Descartes mentioned Aristotelianism only twice; by contrast, the topics of theology, faith, and atheism were put on the table hundreds of times. Both Descartes and Voetius acknowledged that the issue they treated was most of all theological.

Voetius pursued the faith-seeking-understanding program whereas Descartes repudiated the faith-lacking-understanding project. The primary concern of Voetius was not to preserve Aristotelianism but to keep the biblical truth that, as he put it, was received from orthodox tradition.

Descartes insisted that the article of faith did not fall under the regime of human reason because faith was something one could not fully grasp with reason. He argued that whoever embraced the articles of faith for incorrect reasoning would commit a sin no less grave than those who rejected them. What Descartes desperately defended was the autonomy of human reason and its proper use. In his philosophical enterprise, faith seemed to hinder the autonomy and the use of reason. He believed that his method of doubt would provide a firm road to perfect knowledge.

Voetius, however, argued that human reason was surrounded by error and sin, so perfect knowledge was impossible for humans. He maintained that human beings would be able to learn the truth from divine revelation, which was the only principle in the pursuit of truth. Therefore, for Voetius, Cartesianism was primarily confronted with scriptural truth, not with Aristotelianism.

== Sources ==
- van Asselt, WJ; Dekker, E, eds. (1995), De scholastieke Voetius: Een luisteroefening aan de hand van Voetius' Disputationes Selectae (in Dutch), Zoetermeer: Boekencentrum.
- Andreas J. Beck: "Gisbertus Voetius (1589–1676): Basic Features of His Doctrine of God." In Willem J. van Asselt und Eef Dekker (ed.). Reformation and Scholasticism: An Ecumenical enterprise. Grand Rapids, MI: Baker Academic, 2001, 205–26.
- Andreas J. Beck: Zur Rezeption Melanchthons bei Gisbertus Voetius (1589–1676), namentlich in seiner Gotteslehre. In Günter Frank, Herman Selderhuis (Hrsg.): Melanchthon und der Calvinismus. Melanchthon-Schriften der Stadt Bretten, 9. Frommann-Holzboog, Stuttgart-Bad Cannstatt 2005, S. 319–44.
- Andreas J. Beck: Gisbertus Voetius (1589–1676). Sein Theologieverständnis und seine Gotteslehre. Vandenhoeck & Ruprecht, Göttingen 2007 (FKDG, 92).
- Reinhard Breymayer: Auktionskataloge deutscher Pietistenbibliotheken [...]. In Bücherkataloge als buchgeschichtliche Quellen in der frühen Neuzeit. Hrsg. von Reinhard Wittmann. Wiesbaden (1985) (Wolfenbütteler Schriften zur Geschichte des Buchwesens, Bd. 10), S. 113–208; hier S. 150–54 zur Privatbibliothek des orthodoxen Theologen G. Voetius.
- AC Duker, Gysbertus Voetius, I—III (1893–1914).
- Aza Goudriaan: Die Bedeutung der Trinitätslehre nach Gisbert Voetius. In: Harm Klueting, Jan Rohls (Hrsg.): Reformierte Retrospektiven: Vorträge der zweiten Emder Tagung zur Geschichte des Reformierten Protestantismus. Emder Beiträge zum reformierten Protestantismus, 4. Foedus Verlag, Wuppertal 2001, S. 137–45.
- Aza Goudriaan: Reformed Orthodoxy and Philosophy, 1625–1750. Gisbertus Voetius, Petrus van Mastricht, and Anthonius Driessen. Brill’s Series in Church History, 26. Leiden [etc.]: Brill, 2006.
- Christian Möller: Einführung in die Praktische Theologie, Tübingen 2004 (UTB 2529).
- Andreas Mühling: Zwischen Puritanismus, Orthodoxie und frühem Pietismus – Gisbert Voetius und die 'Nadere Reformatie'. In Monatshefte für Evangelische Kirchengeschichte des Rheinlandes 52 (2003), S. 243–54.
- Andreas Mühling: Art. Voetius, Gisbert. In: Theologische Realenzyklopädie 35 (2003), S. 181–84.
- Han van Ruler: The Crisis of Causality. Voetius and Descartes on God, Nature and Change. Brill, Leiden/New York/Köln 1995.
- Erich Wenneker (1997). "Voetius, Gisbert". In Bautz, Traugott (ed.). Biographisch-Bibliographisches Kirchenlexikon (BBKL) (in German). Vol. 12. Herzberg: Bautz. cols. 1549–54. ISBN 3-88309-068-9.
- Woo, B Hoon (2013), "The Understanding of Gisbertus Voetius and René Descartes on the Relationship of Faith and Reason, and Theology and Philosophy", Westminster Theological Journal, 75 (1), Westminster Theological seminary: 45–63.
