= Nadere Reformatie =

Historical period

Part of the series on
Modern scholasticism
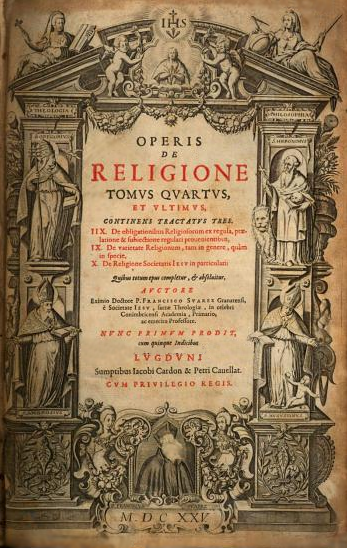
Title page of the Operis de religione (1625) from Francisco Suárez
Background

Protestant Reformation
Counter-Reformation
Aristotelianism
Scholasticism
Patristics

Modern scholastics

Second scholasticism of the School of Salamanca
Lutheran scholasticism during Lutheran orthodoxy
Ramism among the Reformed orthodoxy
Metaphysical poets in the Church of England

Reactions within Christianity

Jesuits against Jansenism
Labadists against the Jesuits
Pietism against orthodox Lutherans
Nadere Reformatie within Dutch Calvinism
Richard Hooker against the Ramists

Reactions within philosophy

Neologists against Lutherans
Spinozists against Dutch Calvinists
Deists against Anglicanism
John Locke against Bishop Stillingfleet

Nadere Reformatie (Dutch Second Reformation or Further Reformation) is the period of church history in the Netherlands, following the Reformation, from roughly 1600 until 1750.

== History ==
The period and its representatives are known for their desire to apply the principles of the Reformation to their day – their homes, churches, and, indeed, all sectors of Dutch society in the seventeenth and early eighteenth century. In their balance and value of both orthodoxy as well as piety, the Nadere Reformatie resembles English Puritanism and German Pietism.

In fact, Puritanism had much influence on the Nadere Reformatie. Many Puritan works were translated into Dutch during this time. Moreover, many Dutch visiting students learned about Puritan ideas from English universities.

The two leading figures of the period are a professor, Gisbertus Voetius, and a pastor, Wilhelmus à Brakel. Brakel's main work, the Redelijke Godsdienst, an explanation, defense, and application of the Reformed faith, has been translated into English.

== Notable figures ==
- Jean Taffin (1529–1602)
- Willem Teellinck (1579–1629)
- Godefridus Udemans (c.1581-1649)
- Gisbertus Voetius (1589–1676)
- Johannes Hoornbeeck (1617–1666)
- Andreas Essenius (1618–1677)
- Jodocus van Lodenstein (1620–1677)
- Petrus van Mastricht (1630–1706)
- Simon Oomius (1630–1706)
- Jacobus Koelman (1632–1695)
- Wilhelmus à Brakel (1635–1711)
- Hermanus Witsius (1636–1708)
- Wilhelmus Schortinghuis (1700–1750)
