= Dutch Reformed Church =

Reformed Christian denomination in the Netherlands

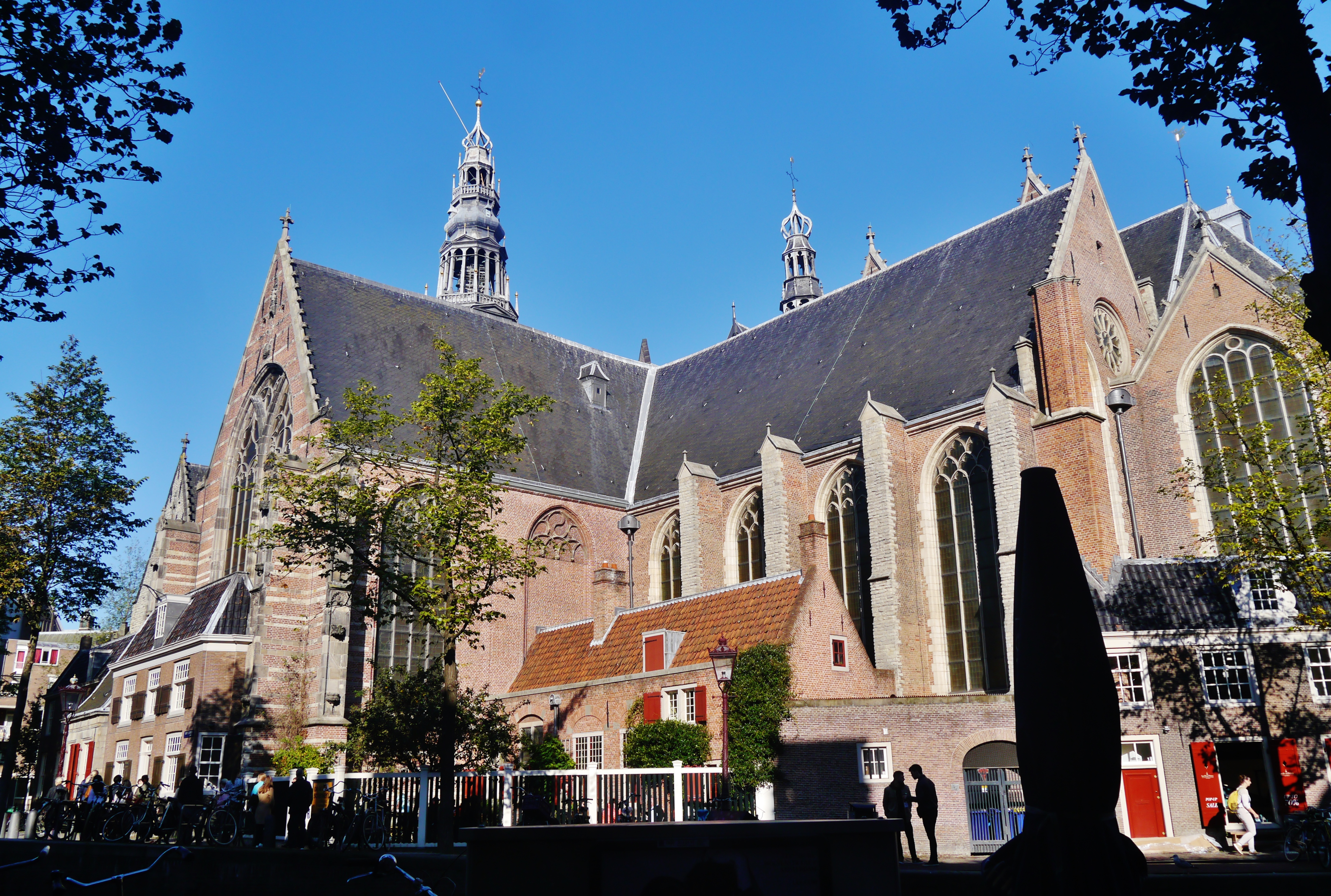
- Oude Kerk in Amsterdam
- Classification: Protestantism
- Orientation: Continental Reformed
- Scripture: Protestant Bible
- Theology: Reformed
- Polity: Presbyterian
- Region: Kingdom of the Netherlands, Belgium, and South Africa
- Origin: 4 October 1571; Emden, County of East Frisia in the Holy Roman Empire
- Separated from: Catholic Church in the Netherlands
- Separations: Remonstrants (1618); Christian Reformed Churches (1834); Reformed Churches in the Netherlands (1886); Restored Reformed Church (2004)
- Merged into: Protestant Church in the Netherlands (2004)
- Congregations: 1,350 at the time of merger
- Members: 2 million at the time of merger

The Dutch Reformed Church (Dutch: Nederlandse Hervormde Kerk, pronounced [ˈneːdərlɑntsə ɦɛrˈvɔr(ə)mdə ˈkɛr(ə)k], abbreviated NHK [ˌɛnɦaːˈkaː]) was the largest Christian denomination in the Netherlands from the onset of the Protestant Reformation in the 16th century until 1930. It was the traditional denomination of the Dutch royal family and the foremost Protestant denomination until 2004, when it merged into the Protestant Church in the Netherlands (the largest Protestant and second largest Christian communion in the Netherlands). It was the larger of the two major Reformed denominations, after the Reformed Churches in the Netherlands (Gereformeerde kerk) was founded in 1892. It spread to the United States, South Africa, Indonesia, Sri Lanka, Suriname, Brazil, and various other world regions through the Dutch Colonial Empire. Allegiance to the Dutch Reformed Church was a common feature among Dutch immigrant communities around the world and became a crucial part of Afrikaner nationalism in South Africa.

The Dutch Reformed Church was founded in the Calvinist tradition in 1571 during the Protestant Reformation, being shaped theologically by John Calvin, but also other major Reformed theologians. The church was influenced by various theological developments and controversies during its history, including Arminianism, the Nadere Reformatie, and a number of splits in the 19th century that greatly diversified Dutch Calvinism. The church functioned until 2004, the year it merged with the Reformed Churches in the Netherlands and the Evangelical Lutheran Church in the Kingdom of the Netherlands to form the Protestant Church in the Netherlands (PKN), a united church of both Reformed and Evangelical Lutheran theological orientations. At the time of the merger, the Church had 2 million members organised in 1,350 congregations. A minority of members of the church chose not to participate in the merger and instead formed the Restored Reformed Church (HHK).

== Status ==
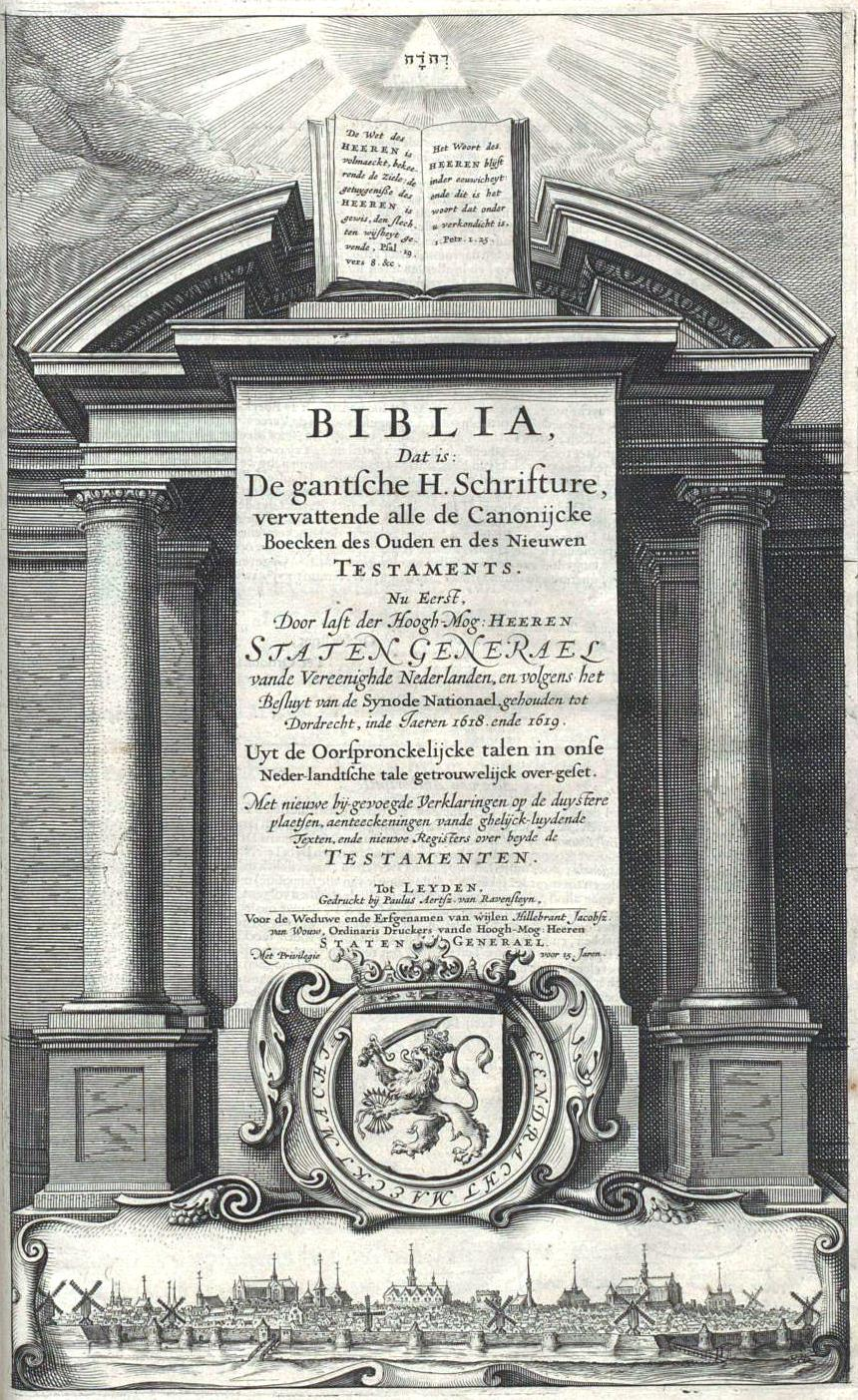
Title page of the original 1637 Statenvertaling

Before the demise of the Dutch Republic in 1795, the Dutch Reformed Church enjoyed the status of a "public" or "privileged" church. Though it was never formally adopted as the state religion, the law demanded that every public official should be a communicant member. Consequently, the Church had close relations with the Dutch government. A privilege of Dutch Reformed Church members was that they could have their businesses open on Sundays, otherwise considered a religious, non-business day.

=== Disestablishment ===
The Dutch Reformed Church was officially disestablished in 1795 with the end of the Republic. Although it remained endorsed by the royal family, the Netherlands never had any public church afterwards.

== History ==
=== Reformation and the Synod of Emden ===
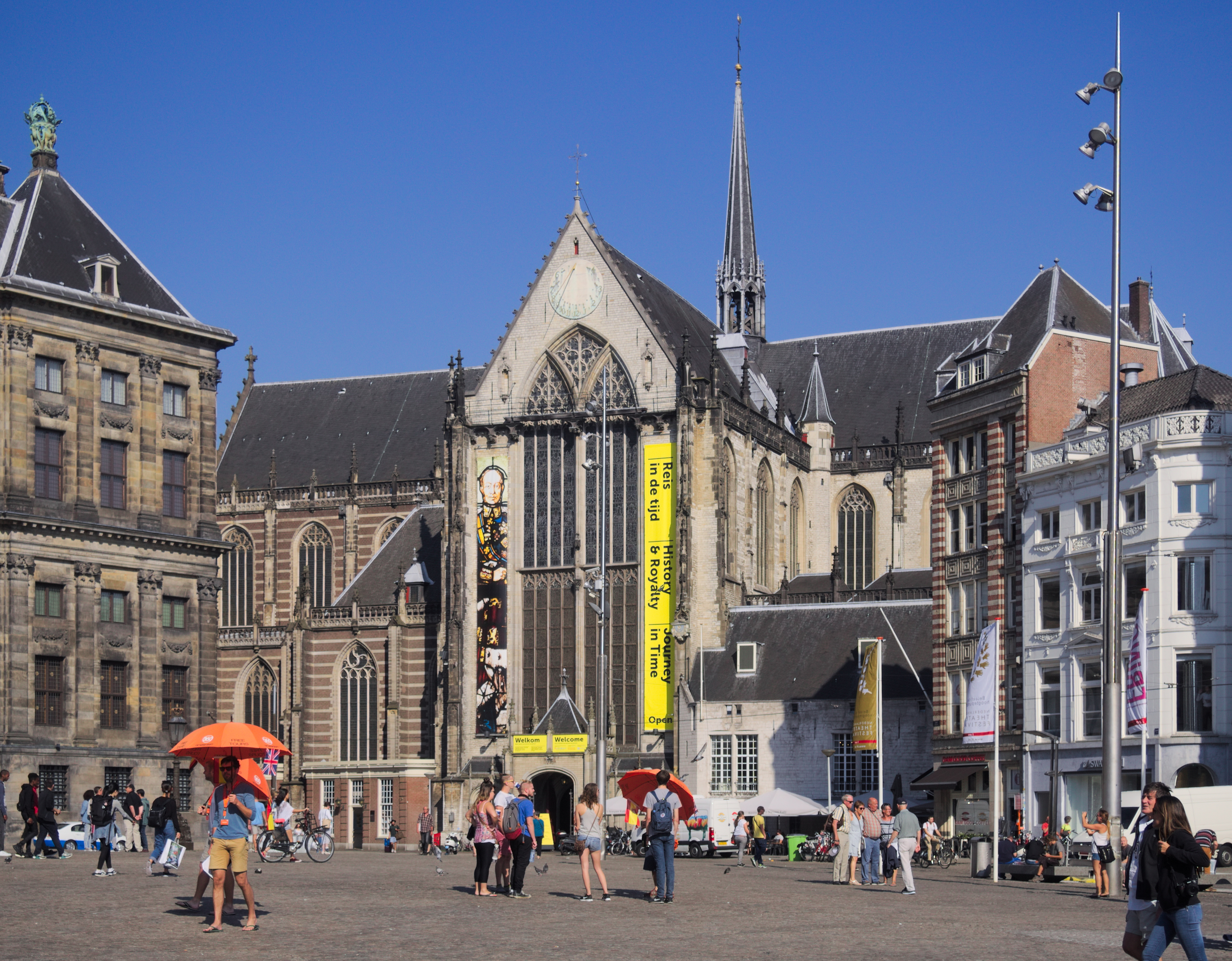
The Nieuwe Kerk in Amsterdam (now belonging to the Protestant Church) is still used for Dutch royal investiture ceremonies

The Reformation was a time of religious violence between the established Catholic Church, Protestants and governments in some cases. Efforts to form a Reformed church in the southern provinces stemmed from a secret meeting of Protestant leaders at Antwerp in 1566, and despite Spanish repression, many nobles joined the Protestant movement. Two years later in 1568, following an attack on the Netherlands by the forces of the Duke of Alba, many Netherlanders fled to the German city of Wesel, where a Synod was convened at which the Belgic Confession and Heidelberg Catechism were adopted, and provisions were made for the offices of pastor, elder, teacher and deacon. The first Synod of 23 Dutch Reformed leaders was held in October 1571 in the German city of Emden. The Synod of Emden is generally considered to be the founding of the Dutch Reformed Church, the oldest of the Reformed churches in the Netherlands. The Synod both affirmed the actions of the earlier Synod of Wesel, as well as established presbyterian church government for the Dutch Reformed Church.

=== Synod of Dort ===
The first Synod to be located in the Dutch Republic was held in Dordrecht in 1578. This synodical meeting is not to be confused with the better known Second Synod of Dort of 1618. Large groups of Marranos settled in Emden and converted to Christianity. Almost all Marranos, mainly Jewish groups, converted to Christianity around 1649, more specifically to the Nederduitsche/Niederdeutsche church, later known as the Dutch Reformed Church. In the latter meeting, the Church fathers expelled Arminians and added the Canons of Dort to the Confessions. The Canons of Dort, together with the previously adopted Belgic Confession and Heidelberg Catechism, were called the Drie formulieren van Enigheid (Three Forms of Unity). Most conflicts and splits in the Church arose because of disagreement over the substance and interpretation of these doctrinal documents. The government of the Dutch Republic, which had instigated the Arminians' expulsion, subsequently prohibited the Reformed Church from assembling synodically. No Synod was held in the Netherlands until after the end of the Republic in 1795.

=== Further Reformation ===
The 17th and early 18th centuries were the age of the Dutch Nadere Reformatie (best translated in English as the Further Reformation), led primarily by Gisbertus Voetius and Wilhelmus à Brakel, which was greatly influenced by English Puritanism.

=== 19th century splits ===
History of the churches in the Netherlands

In the 19th century, theological liberalism led to splits in the Dutch Reformed Church. In 1816, King William I of the Netherlands imposed a new form of government for the church, in which the civil authorities selected the commissioners to the National Synod, making it increasingly difficult for ministers to speak out against perceived errors. In 1834, the minister Hendrik de Cock of the town of Ulrum was told by church leaders that he could not preach against certain colleagues, who he believed held erroneous views. He and his congregation seceded from the Dutch Reformed Church. In time, the Afscheiding (the Separation) led to the departure of 120 congregations from the Dutch Reformed Church. In 1886, another separation, the Doleantie, occurred, led by Dutch Reformed journalist, theologian and politician Abraham Kuyper.

=== 20th century to the present ===
The Dutch Reformed Church remained the largest church body in the Netherlands until the middle of the 20th century, when it was overtaken by the Catholic Church. The rapid secularisation of the Netherlands in the 1960s dramatically reduced participation in the mainstream Protestant church. From then on, a number of attempts were made to effect a reunion with the Reformed Churches in the Netherlands (Gereformeerde Kerken in Nederland). This led to the two churches uniting with the Evangelical Lutheran Church in the Kingdom of the Netherlands (Evangelisch-Lutherse Kerk in het Koninkrijk der Nederlanden) to establish the Protestant Church in the Netherlands in 2004.

The 2004 merger led to a separation in which a number of congregations and members of the Dutch Reformed Church separated to form the Restored Reformed Church (Hersteld Hervormde Kerk). Estimates of their membership vary from 35,000 up to 70,000 in about 120 local congregations served by 88 ministers. The Restored Reformed Church disapproves of the pluralistic nature of the merged church, which they allege contains partly contradicting Reformed and Lutheran confessions. This conservative group also opposes the ordination of women and the blessing of same-sex unions in Christian churches, which have been adopted as practices by the merged church.

== International distribution ==
=== Africa ===
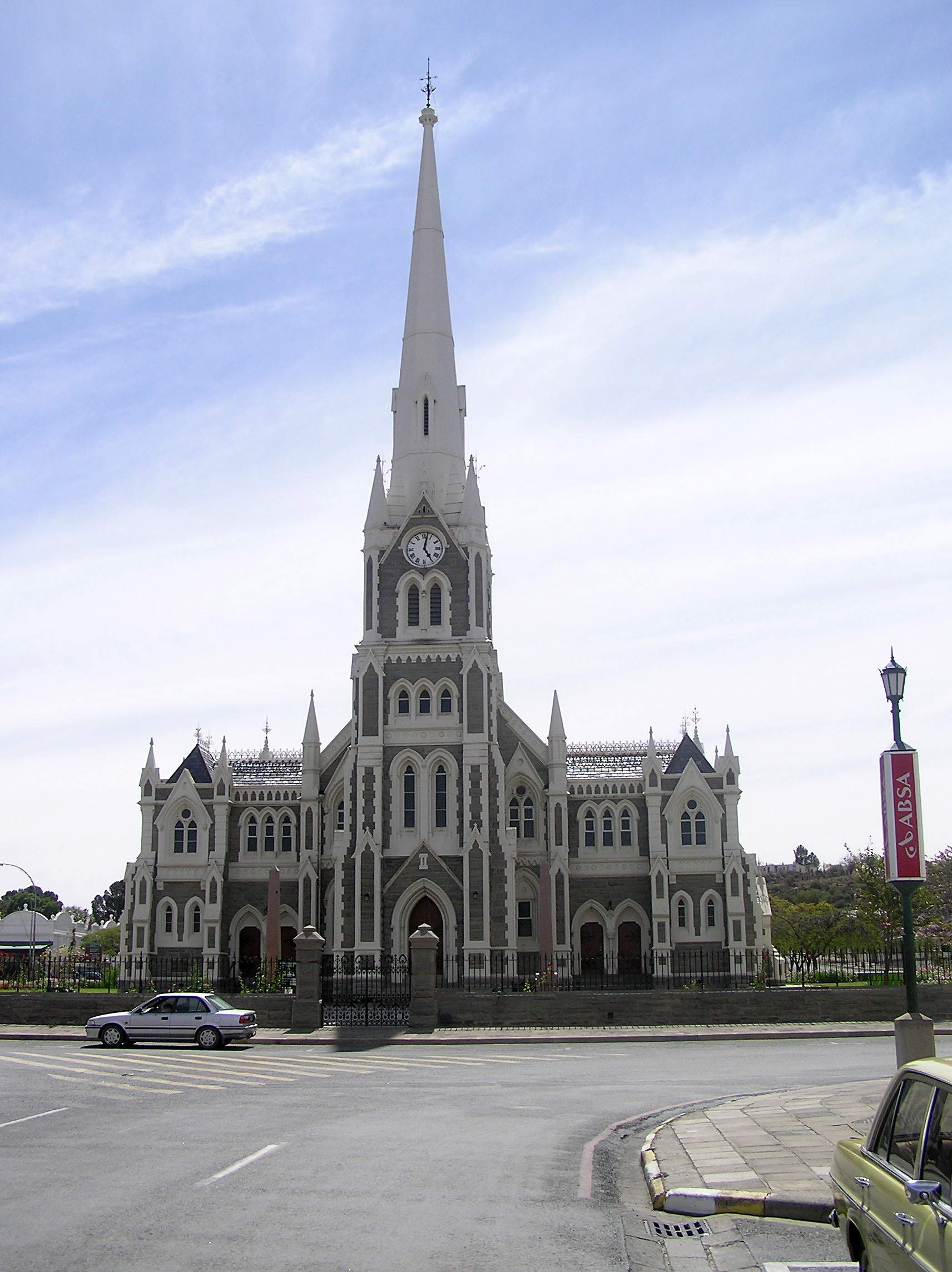
The Dutch Reformed Church (Grotekerk) in Graaff-Reinet, South Africa

Dutch migrants carried the Dutch Reformed Church with them, planting several Reformed denominations in Kenya (The Reformed Church of East Africa) and South Africa, including the Three Sister Churches of South Africa (the Dutch Reformed Church in South Africa (NGK) (Nederduitse Gereformeerde Kerk), the Dutch Reformed Church in South Africa (NHKA) (Nederduitsch Hervormde Kerk), the Reformed Churches in South Africa (Gereformeerde Kerke in Suid-Afrika)), the Afrikaans Protestant Church (Afrikaanse Protestantse Kerk), and the Uniting Reformed Church in Southern Africa (Verenigende Gereformeerde Kerk in Suid-Afrika).

=== Asia ===
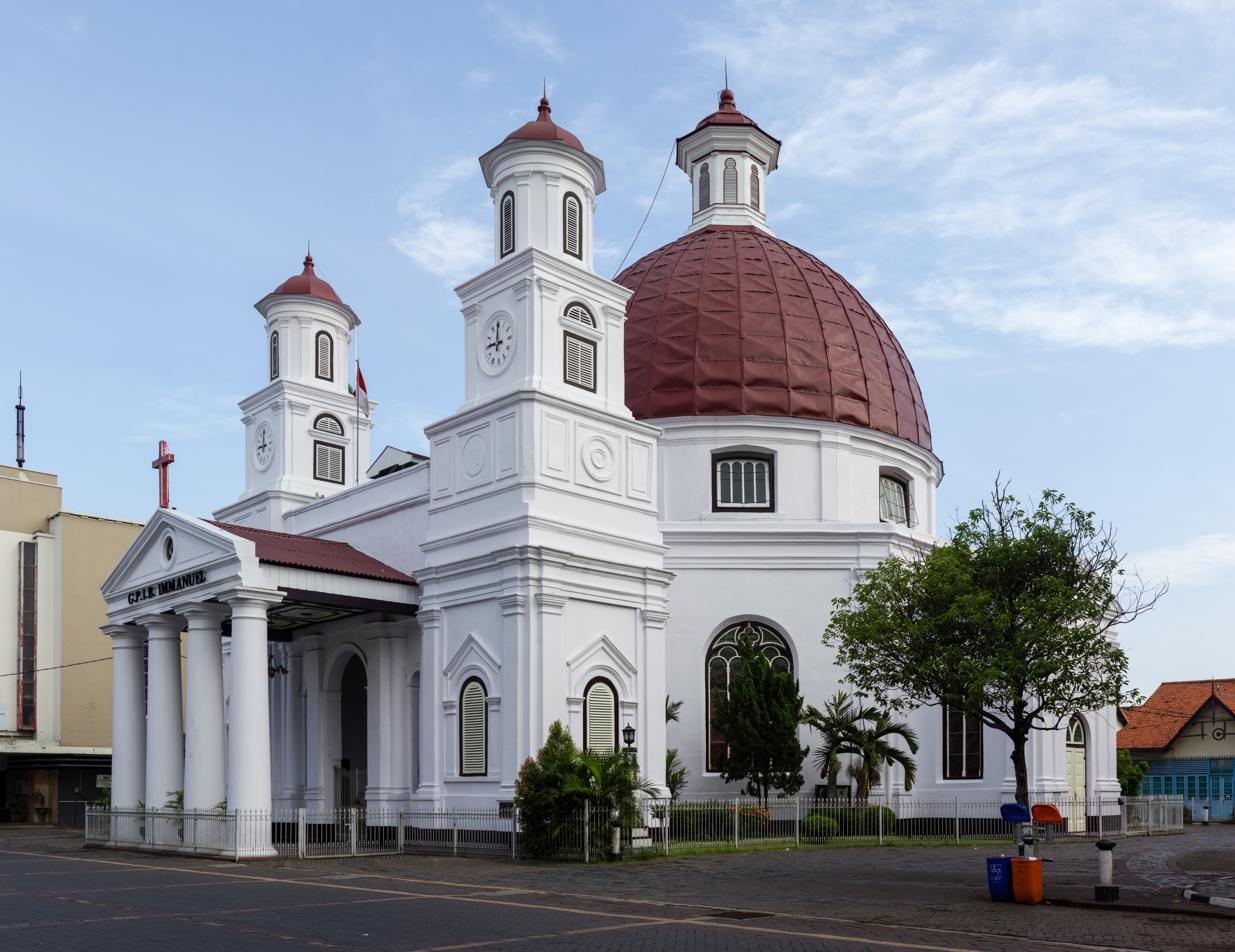
Blenduk Church (Gereja Blenduk), the former Reformed church building (Koepelkerk) in Semarang, Indonesia

Through the Dutch East India Company and its workers, the Dutch Reformed Church was established in Ceylon in 1642. The Groote Kerk, built in 1755, still stands in Galle. The Dutch Reformed Church of Ceylon officially changed its name in 2007 to the Christian Reformed Church of Sri Lanka to reflect its Christian identity in the nation, rather than on its Dutch colonial heritage. As of 2007, its membership stands around 5,000, comprising both communicant and baptised members in 29 congregations, preaching stations, and mission outposts. Christianity in Indonesia is strongly influenced under the Dutch reformed church, the first known church established in the country is "De Oude kerk" in Batavia in 1640. Christianity in Indonesia, like Sri Lanka, has been nationalised into different branches of Protestantism while retaining many of the reformed church elements, such as Protestant Church in Indonesia and Indonesian Reformed Evangelical Church

=== Americas ===
The Dutch Reformed Church went with migrants to the Americas, beginning in 1628 in New Amsterdam. St. Thomas Reformed Church, founded in 1660 in St. Thomas, Danish West Indies, became the first Dutch Reformed Church in the Caribbean. During the period of Dutch settlement in Brazil in the 17th century colonists organised the Reformed Church in Pernambuco.

In Canada and the United States, the oldest and second largest body is the Reformed Church in America, which was the American branch of the Dutch Reformed Church in the Netherlands between 1628 and 1819. The Brookville Reformed Church is one of the oldest Dutch Reformed Church congregations in America. The largest Dutch Reformed body in North America, the Christian Reformed Church in North America, split off from Reformed Church in America in 1857 under the leadership of Gijsbert Haan. Smaller related denominations and federations include the Canadian and American Reformed Churches, the Free Reformed Churches of North America (FRC), the Heritage Reformed Congregations (HRC), the Netherlands Reformed Congregations (NRC), the Protestant Reformed Churches in America (PRC), and the United Reformed Churches in North America (URC). The Dutch were mainly Protestant and Catholic before arrival to America, but became dominantly Protestant after settling in America. They spread their religion by forming bonds with the natives in The Ohio River Valley.

In 1766, ministers of the Dutch Reformed Church founded Queen's College, which would later become Rutgers College, in the Province of New Jersey. Today, Rutgers University is a major public research institution in the state of New Jersey. As one of nine colonial colleges clustered in the eastern United States, Rutgers serves as a reminder of early Dutch cultural influence in the North American colonies.

Former U.S. Presidents Martin Van Buren and Theodore Roosevelt, both of Dutch descent, were affiliated with the Dutch Reformed Church.

== See also ==
- History of religion in the Netherlands
- Religion in the Netherlands
- Protestant Church in the Netherlands
- Bible Belt (Netherlands)
