= Religion in the Netherlands =

Religions in the Netherlands (15+ population) (2025)
1. No religion (58%)
2. Catholicism (16%)
3. Protestantism (12%)
4. Islam (6%)
5. Other (7%)
6. Rounding (1%)

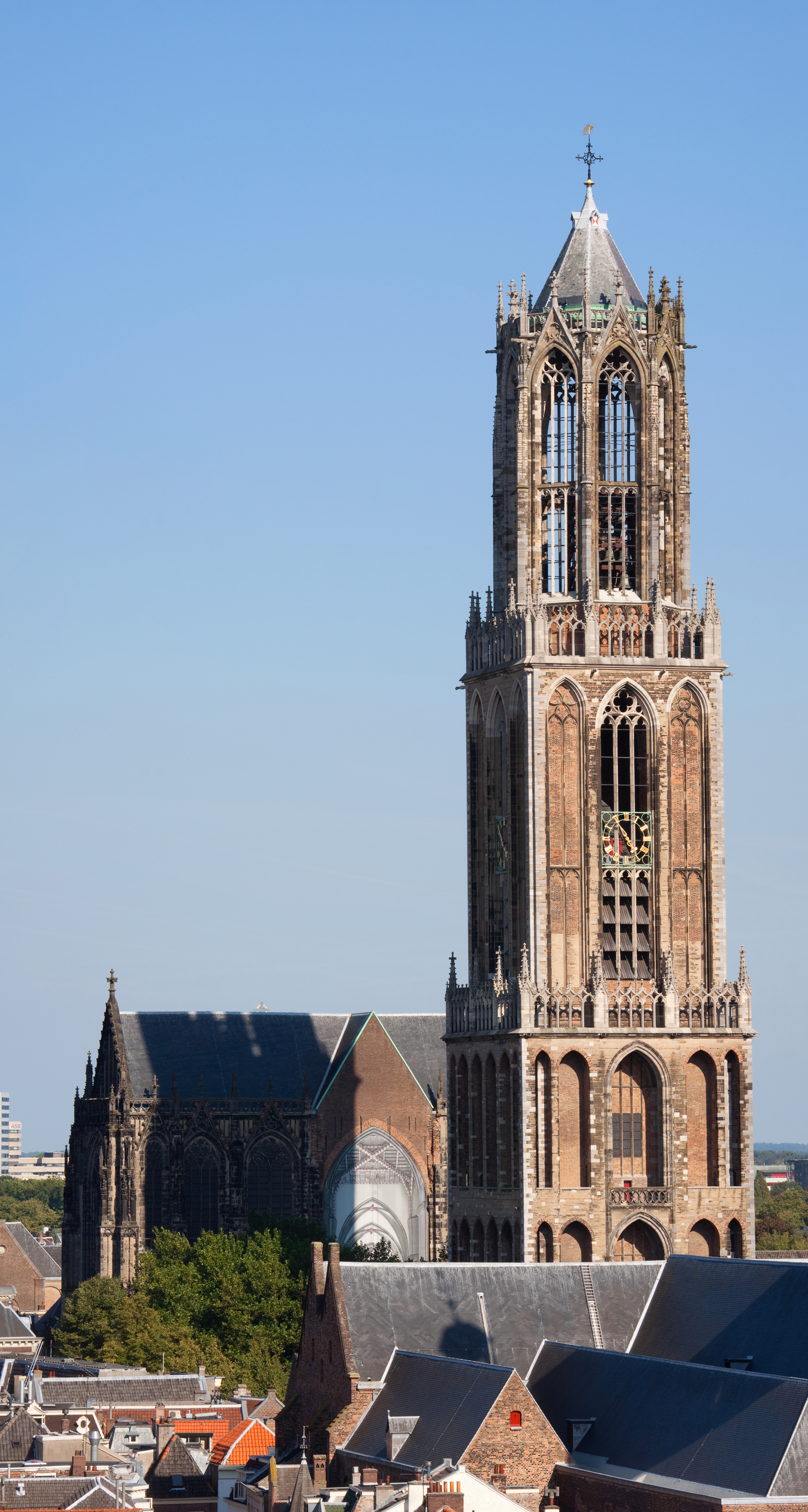
St. Martin's Cathedral in Utrecht.

Religion in the Netherlands was dominated by Christianity between the 10th and 20th centuries. In the late 19th century, roughly 60% of the population was Calvinist and 35% was Catholic. Also, until The Holocaust, there was a noticeable Jewish minority. Since World War II, there has been a significant decline in Catholic and especially Protestant Christianity, with Protestantism declining to such a degree that Catholicism became the foremost form of the Christian religion. The majority of the Dutch population is secular; however, historic societal pillarisation (verzuiling) based on religious lines continue to influence parts of Dutch society. Relatively sizable Muslim and Hindu minorities also exist.

In 2015, Statistics Netherlands, the government institute that gathers statistical information about the Netherlands, found that 50.1% of the adult (18+) population declared no religious affiliation. Christians comprised 43.8% of the total population; by denomination, Catholicism was 23.7%, the members of the Protestant Church of the Netherlands were 15.5%, and members of other Christian denominations were 4.6%. Islam comprised 4.9% of the total population, Hinduism 0.6%, Buddhism 0.4%, and Judaism 0.1%. There are large geographic disparities between the concentration of Protestants and Catholics, mostly divided by the Grote Rivieren, while a high concentration of Calvinists live in a long strip of land known as the Bible Belt.

The Constitution of the Netherlands guarantees freedom of education, which means that all schools that adhere to general quality criteria receive the same government funding. This includes schools based on religious principles by religious groups. Three out of nineteen political parties in the States General (CDA, CU and SGP) are based upon Christian belief. Several Christian religious holidays are national holidays (Christmas, Easter, Pentecost, and the Ascension of Jesus). Atheism, agnosticism, and Christian atheism are on the rise and are widely accepted and considered to be non-controversial. Even among those who formally adhere to Christianity, there are high percentages of atheists, agnostics, and ietsists, since affiliation with a Christian denomination is also used in a way of cultural identification in various parts of the Netherlands. Many Dutch people believe religion should not have a significant role in politics and education. Religion is also primarily considered a personal matter which should not be discussed in public.

In 2015, 82% of the Netherlands' population said they never or almost never visited a church, and 59% stated that they had never been to a church of any kind. Of all the people questioned, 24% saw themselves as atheist, an increase of 11% compared to the previous study done in 2006. Ietsism, or spirituality, is rising according to research done in 2015. In 2017 non-religious people were in the majority for the first time. Only 49% of people older than 15 years identified as religious, compared to 54% in 2012. The largest denomination was still Catholicism at 24%, while 5% identified with Islam. Because of the decline of Christianity, the CBS stopped making a distinction between different protestant groups, the last detailed distinction being that of 2019. The 2023-2024 European Social Survey found that 13% identified as Protestant and 11% as Catholic.

== History ==
=== Antiquity: polytheism ===
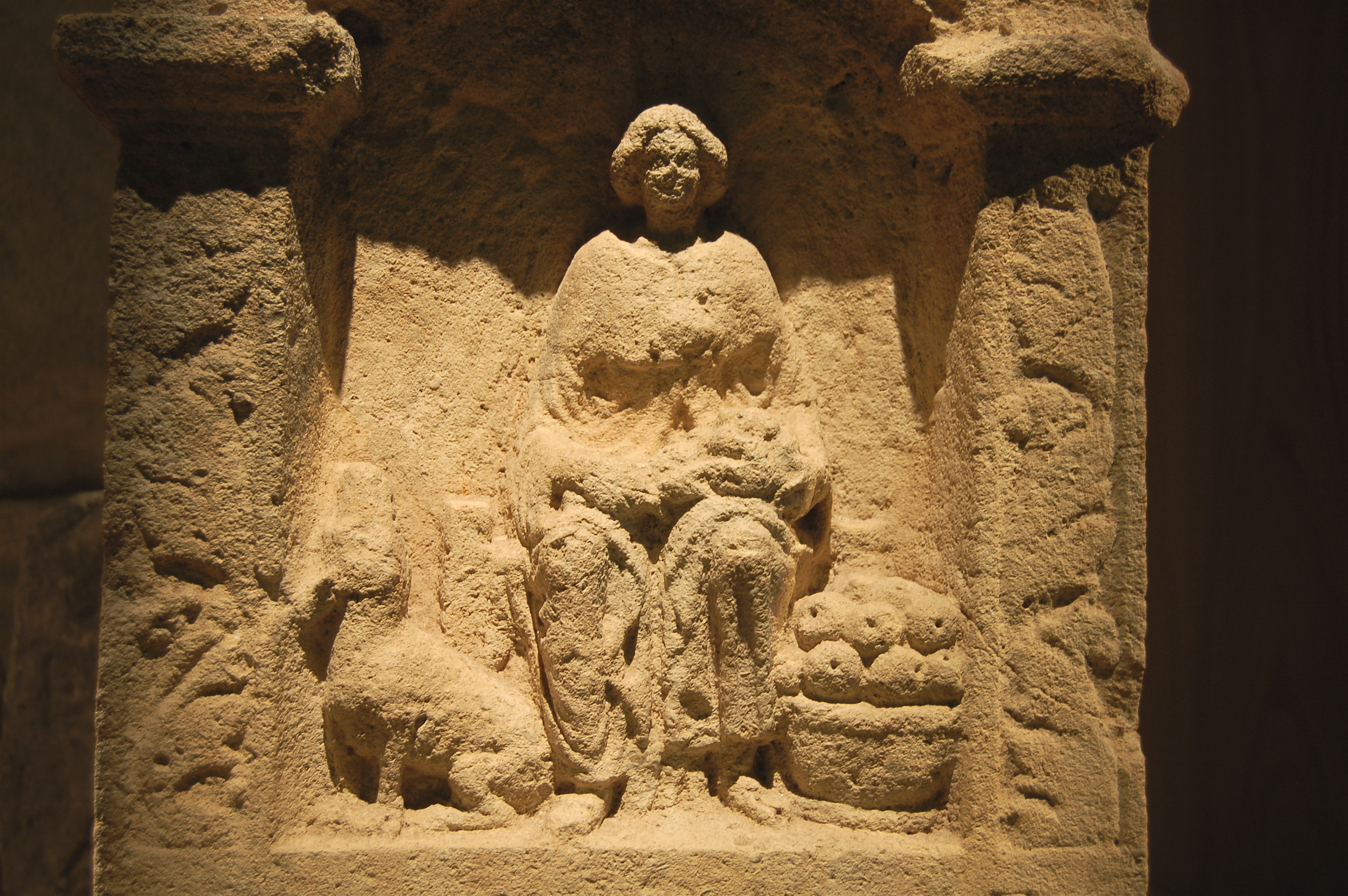
Altar for Nehalennia 150-250 AD

The oldest data on the profession of religion by the inhabitants of the regions that are now the "Netherlands" are passed down by the Romans. Contrary to what ancient sources seem to suggest, the Rhine, which clearly formed the boundary of the Roman Empire, did not appear to form the boundary between residential areas of Celts and Germans. There were Germans south of it (Germani Cisrhenani) and many place names and archaeological finds indicate the presence of Celts north of the Rhine.

Between these Celtic and Germanic peoples, and later the Roman conquerors (romanization), a cultural exchange took place. The tribes adapted one another's myths and polytheistic deities, resulting in a synthesis of Germanic, Celtic, and Roman mythology. Gods such as Nehalennia, Hiudana and Sandraudiga are of indigenous (Celtic) origin, while gods such as Wodan, Donar and Frigg/Freija (see Freya) came from Germanic origin. Others, such as Jupiter, Minerva and Venus, were introduced by the Romans. Tacitus also described the creation myth of Mannus, a primitive man from which all Germanic tribes would have emerged. The Celts and Germans in the Low Countries had tree shrines, following the example of the Old Norse Yggdrasil, the Saxon Irminsul, and Donar's oak. Temples were probably only built during and after the romanization, and have been preserved in places such as Empel and Elst.

=== Middle Ages: Christianisation and theocentrism ===
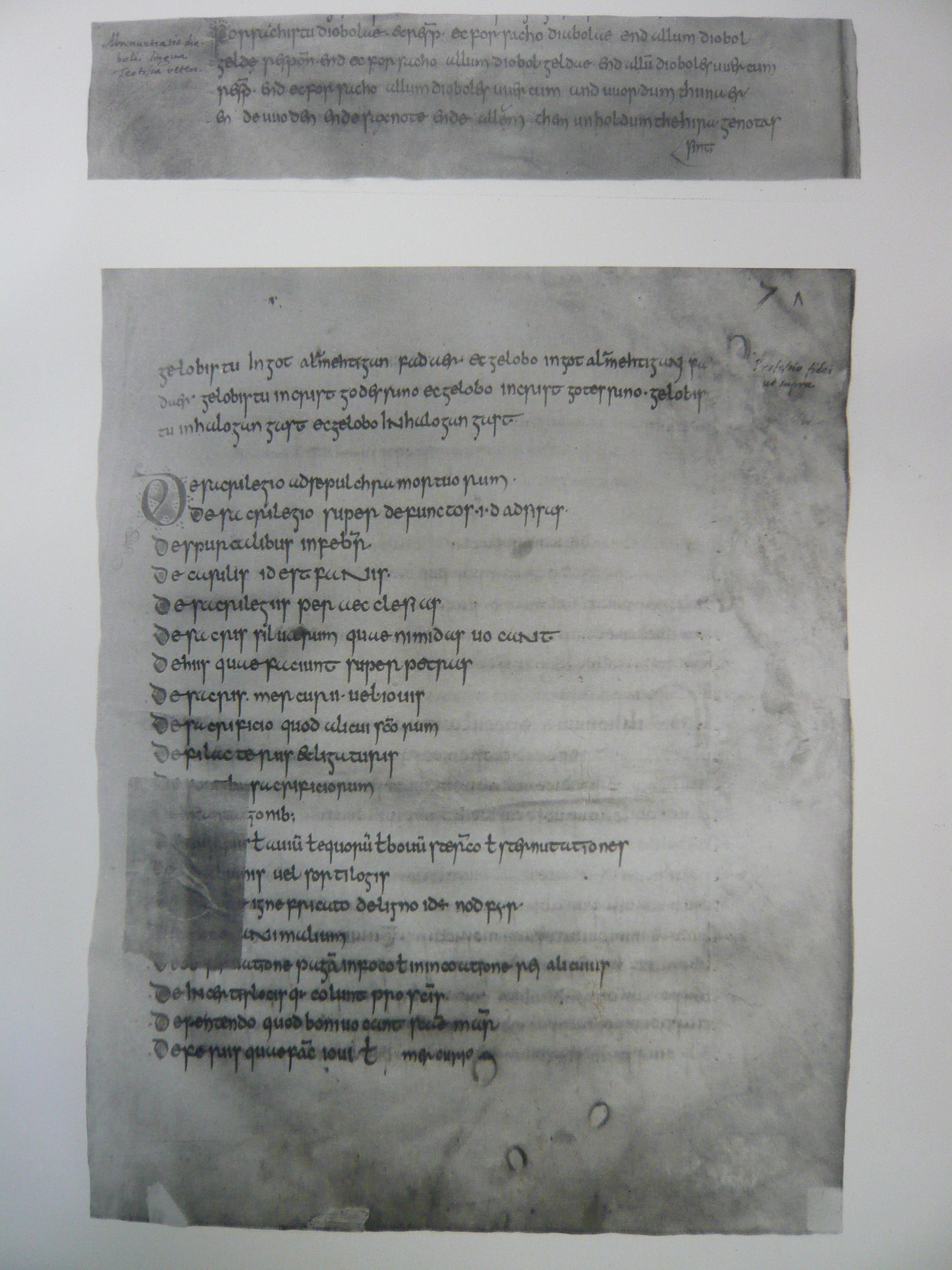
The Old Saxon Baptismal Vow: "Forsachistu diobolae.." (Forsakest thou devils) and "gelobistu in Got alamehtigan fadaer" (believest thou in God almighty father). Left caption in a later writing: "Abrinuciatio diaboli lingua Teotisca veter." = (abjuration of the devil in presumably Old Saxon). Under the Baptismal Vow in Latin an enumeration of the first 20 practices in the Indiculus superstitionum et paganiarum.

From the 4th to the 6th century AD The Great Migration took place, in which the small Celtic-Germanic-Roman tribes in the Low Countries were gradually supplanted by three major Germanic tribes: the Franks, the Frisians and Saxons. Around 500 of the Franks, initially residing between the Rhine and the Somme, converted to Christianity following the conversion of their king Chlodovech. A large part of the area south of the Maas (Meuse) belonged from the early Middle Ages to 1559 to Archdeacon Kempenland, which was part of the Diocese of Tongeren-Maastricht-Luik (Liege). From the center of the diocese, successively the cities of Tongeren, Maastricht and Luik, this part of the Netherlands was probably Christianized.

According to tradition, the first Bishop of Maastricht, Servatius was buried in this city in 384, though only from Bishop Domitianus (ca. 535) is it established that he resided in Maastricht. However, it would take at least until 1000 AD before all pagan people were actually Christianized and the Frisian and Saxon religions became extinct, and elements of the extinguished pagan religions were incorporated into the Christian religion even after conversion. In the following centuries, Catholicism was the only mainstream religion in the Netherlands. In the 14th and 15th century, the first calls were heard for religious reform.

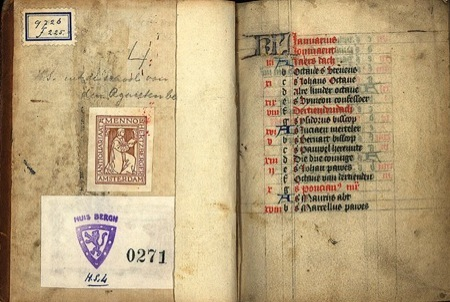
The beginning of the Book of the Hours of Geert Grote

=== Early Modern Era: Reformation ===
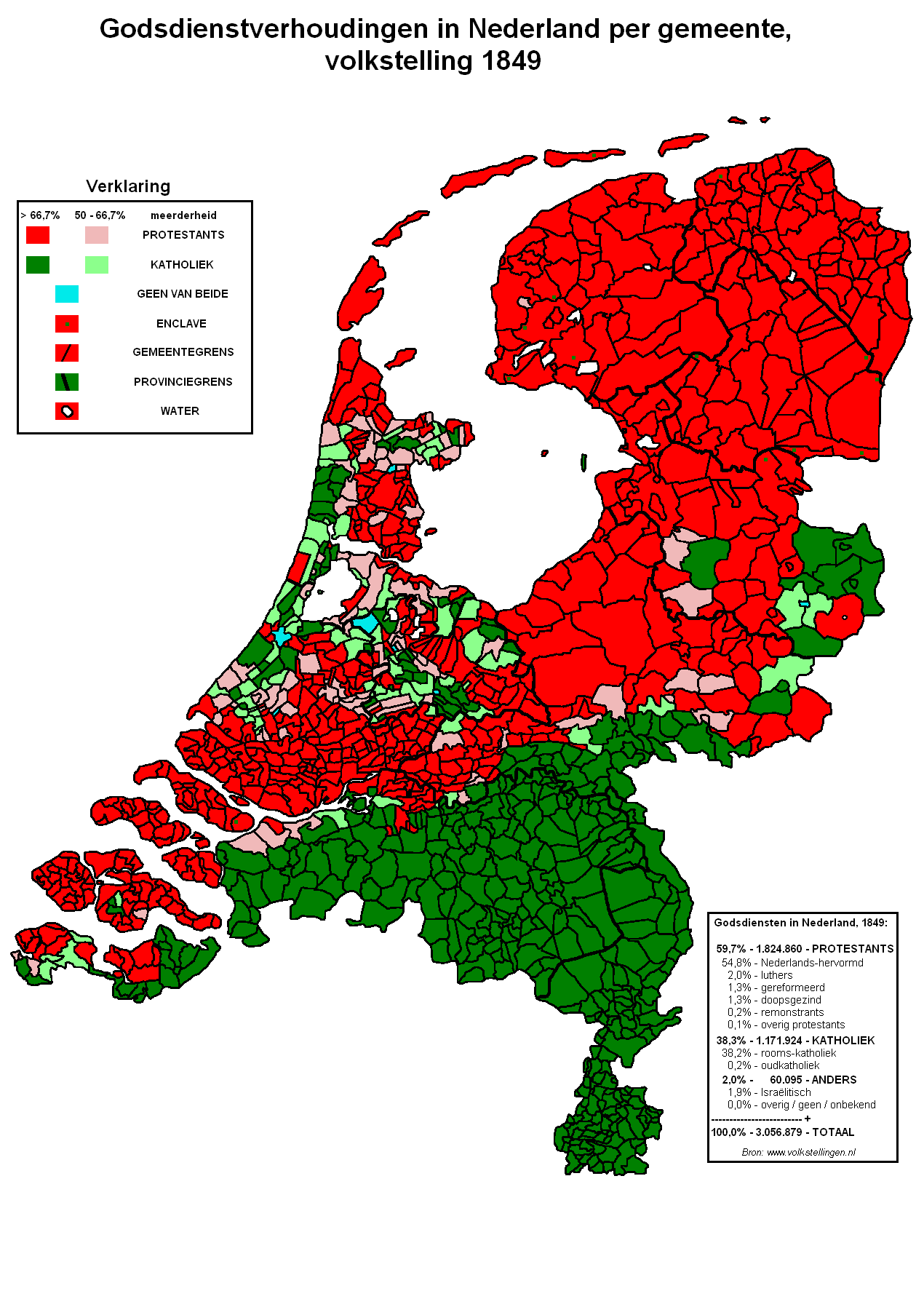
Religion in the Netherlands in 1849 Catholicism Protestantism (Calvinist)

The rebellious Netherlands that had united in the Union of Utrecht (1579) declared their independence from Spain in 1581, during the Eighty Years' War; Spain finally accepted this in 1648. The Dutch revolt was partially religiously motivated, as during the Reformation many of the Dutch had adopted Lutheran, Anabaptist, Calvinist or Mennonite forms of Protestantism. These religious movements were suppressed by the Spanish, who supported the Counter Reformation. After independence, the Netherlands adopted Calvinism as an informal state religion, but practiced a degree of religious tolerance towards non-Calvinists. It cultivated a reputation as a safe refuge for Jewish and Protestant refugees from Flanders, France (Huguenots), Germany and England.

There have always been considerable differences between orthodox and liberal interpretations of Calvinism, such as those between Arminianism and Gomarism in the 17th century and those between the Dutch Reformed Church (Nederlands Hervormde Kerk) and the Reformed Churches in the Netherlands (Gereformeerde Kerken in Nederland) in the late 19th century, which even led to a denominational difference between hervormd and gereformeerd, though linguistically both mean "reformed". Catholics, who dominated the southern provinces, were not allowed to practice their religion openly. They were emancipated during the late 19th and early 20th century through pillarization, by forming their own social communities. In 1947, 44.3% belonged to Protestant denominations, 38.7% belonged to the Catholic Church, and 17.1% were unaffiliated. In 1940–45, 75-80% of Dutch Jews were murdered in The Holocaust by the Nazis.

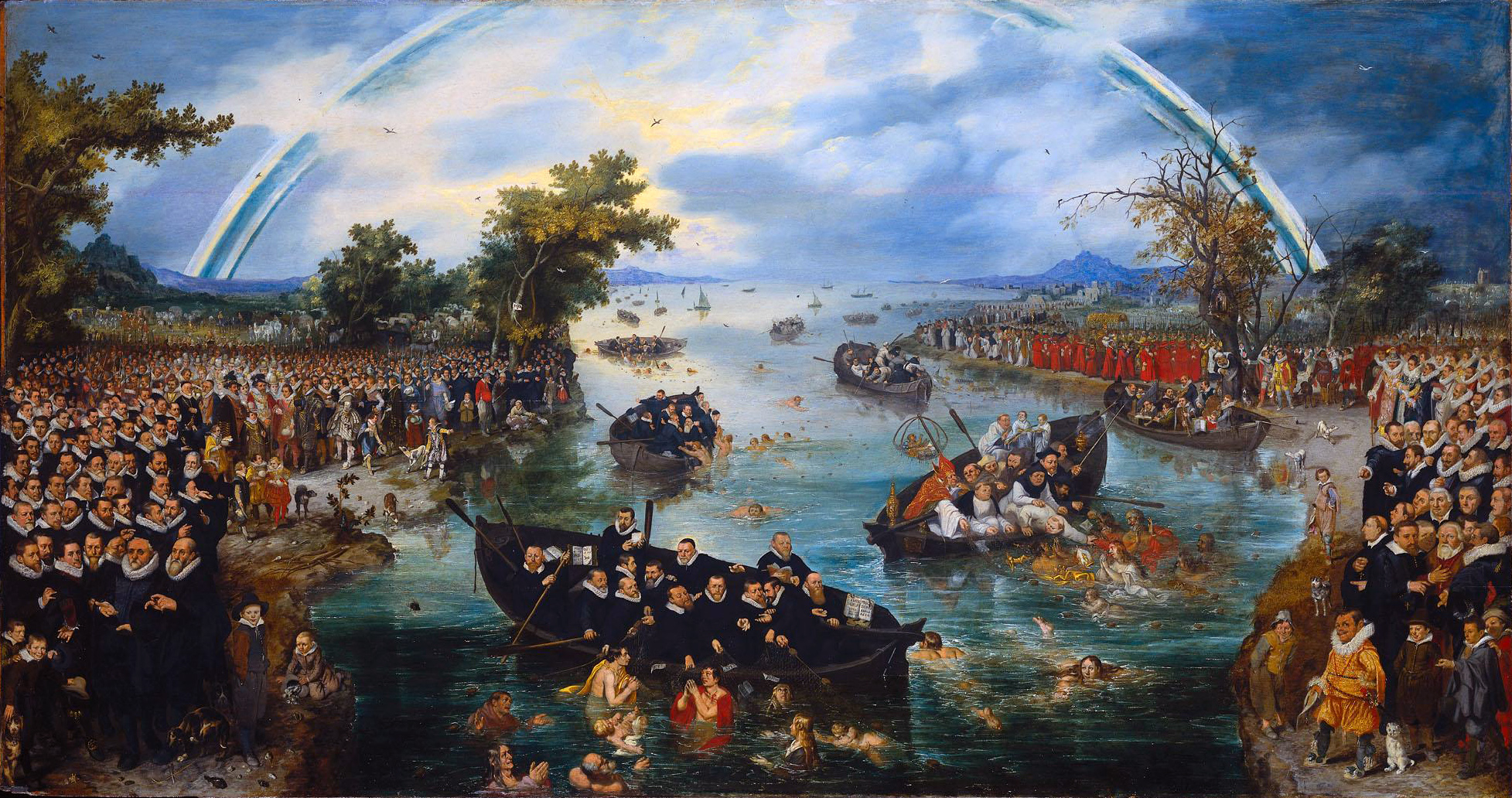
Fishing for Souls (Zielenvisserij), Adriaen Pietersz. van de Venne, 1614, (Rijksmuseum), a satirical allegory of Protestant-Catholic struggles for souls during the Dutch Revolt. On the left are the Protestants including the princes Maurits and Frederik Hendrik. Protestants are fishing in the foreground; their nets are marked with Fides, Spes and Caritas. On the right are Catholics including archdukes Albert and Isabella, Spinola, and Pope Paul V carried by cardinals. A bishop and his Catholic priests are fishing in the boat for people.

Since 1880 the major religions began to decline as secularism, socialism and liberalism grew; in the 1960s and 1970s Protestantism and Catholicism began to decline at a rapid rate. The major exception is Islam, which grew considerably largely as a result of immigration. In 2013, a Catholic became queen consort.

=== Modern era: secularization, decline of Christianity, and growth of religious minorities ===
Secularization in the Netherlands started around 1880, and major religions began to decline after the Second World War. Religion lost its influence on Dutch politics between the 1960s and 1980s, resulting in liberal Dutch policy. The increasing trend towards secularism is countered by a religious revival in the Protestant Bible Belt, and the growth of Muslim and Hindu communities resulting from immigration and high birth rates. As a result of the declining religious adherence, the two major strands of Calvinism, the Dutch Reformed Church and the Reformed Churches in the Netherlands, together with a small Lutheran group began to cooperate, first as the Samen op weg Kerken ("Together on the road churches") and since 2004 as the Protestant Church in the Netherlands, a united Protestant church.

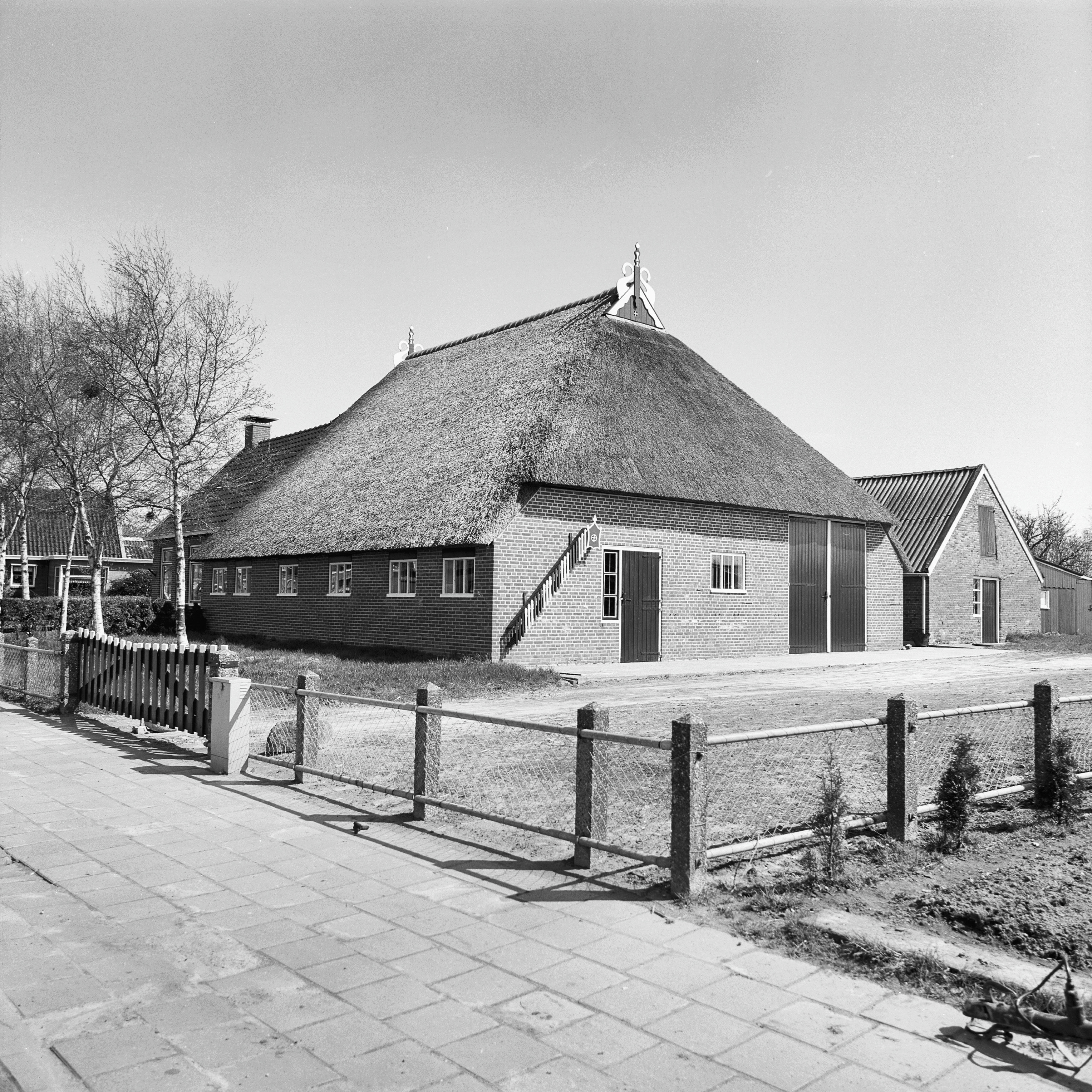
Lutheran church in Kollumerzwaag

During the same period, Islam increased from essentially nonexistent to 5% of the population. The main sources of Muslim immigrants include Suriname and Indonesia from decolonization, Turkey and Morocco as migrant workers, and Iraq, Iran, Bosnia and Afghanistan as refugees. In the early 21st century, religious tensions between native Dutch people and migrant Muslims was increasing. After the rise of politician Pim Fortuyn, who sought to defend the Dutch liberal culture against what he saw as a "backwards religion", stricter immigration laws were enacted. Religious tensions increased after the murders of Pim Fortuyn in 2002 by environmental extremist Volkert van der Graaf, and Theo van Gogh in 2004.

In December 2014, for the first time there were more atheists (25%) than theists (17%) in the Netherlands, with majorities of the population being agnostic (31%) or spiritual but not religious (27%). Secular humanism has a notable presence in the Netherlands, with research in 2003 indicating about 9.4% of the population expressing affinity with the movement.

==== Pluralism ====
Slightly more than half (52.8%) of the respondents to a research study about humanism in 2003 were affiliated with no religious or philosophical movement at all. In contrast, 8% reported following more than one movement. This form of pluralism occurs in all religious and philosophical Dutch movements but is strongest among supporters of non-Western religions. 75% of Dutch Buddhists also affiliate with other religious or philosophical movements. Among followers of Hinduism in the Netherlands, this ratio is even higher, at 91%. On the other hand, followers of Western religions and humanism, as well as movements in the 'other' category were least likely to affiliate with more than one religious or philosophical movement.

Within Western movements, the people affiliating with humanism were most likely to also adhere to one or more other movements (47%). Most of these humanists adhere to Catholicism (27%), Protestantism (14%) or Buddhism (12%). Also 9% of Catholics, 6% of Protestants, and 50% of the Buddhists counting themselves as humanists, as well as 25% of Muslims, 55% of the Hindu, 19% of the Jews, and 15% of the supporters of a movement other than these listed.

==== Cults, sects and new religious movements ====
Cults, sects and new religious movements have the same legal rights as larger and more mainstream religious movements. The Dutch government chose not to make special laws regarding cults, sects or new religious movements (generally all informally called "sekten" in Dutch). This decision was based on reports made after the 1978 Jonestown mass murder and suicide. Nor is there any officially assigned institute that provides information to the public about these movements and organizations.

Since November 2012, there has been an official complaint website about cults, sects, new religious movements, spiritual courses, philosophy courses, and therapy groups. The website was initiated by the Ministry of Security and Justice. The website can also refer people to psychological counsellors. The immediate reason for this website was an undercover documentary by the commercial TV station SBS6 about the Miracle of Love movement.

As of 2004, the Netherlands did not have an anti-cult movement of any significance.

=== 2000s ===
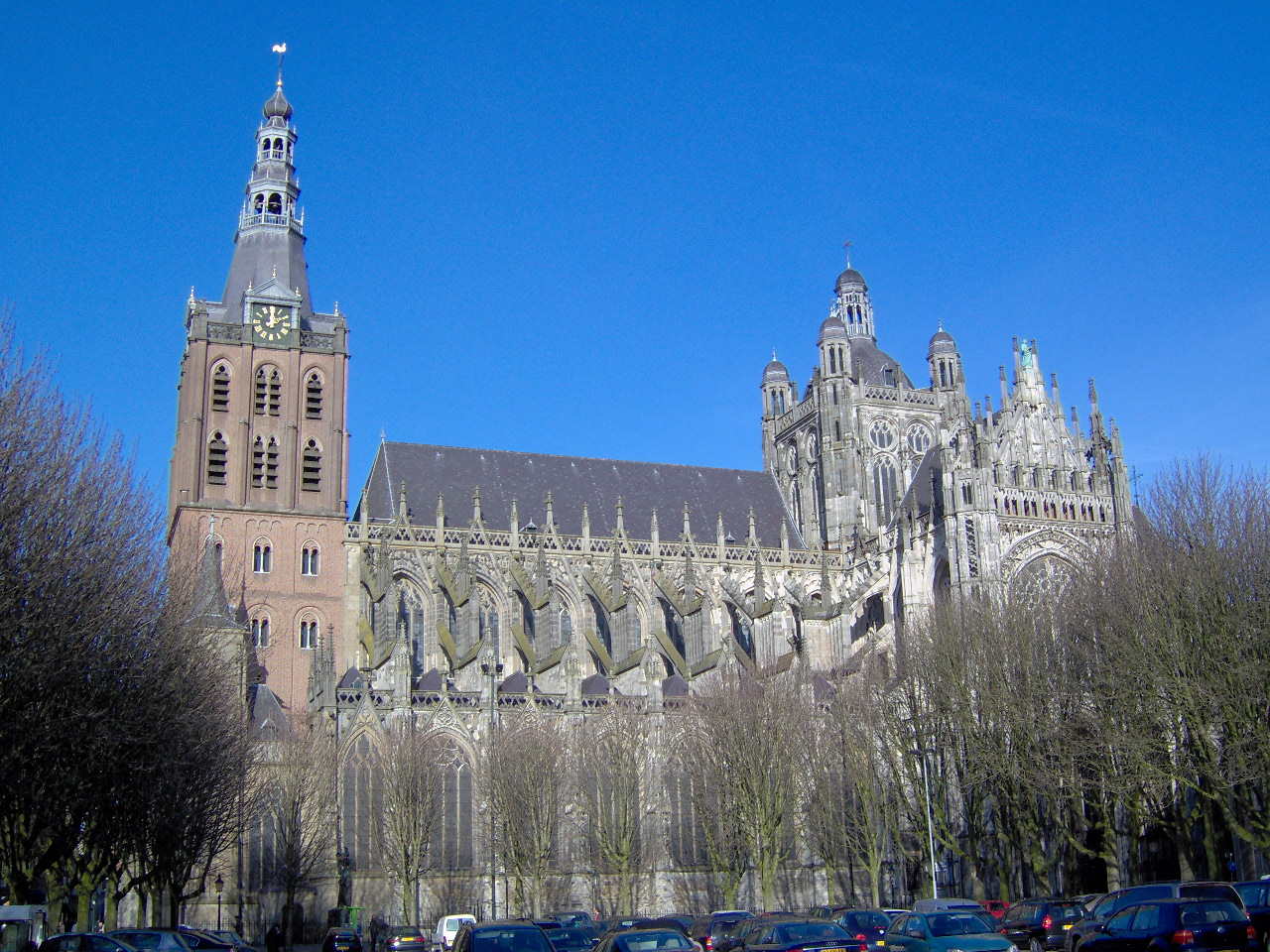
Sint-Janskathedraal in Den Bosch

While 67.8% of the Dutch population are not members of any religious community, the remainder report affiliation with a multitude of religions. 24.5% of the Dutch population is affiliated with a Christian church. The largest group, 11.7% in 2015, is Roman Catholic. The rest are distributed over a multitude of Protestant churches, which made up 12.8% of the population in 2012. The largest of these is the Protestant Church in the Netherlands (8.6%), which in fact is an alliance of three churches, two Calvinist and one Lutheran. Smaller churches make up about 0.1% of the Dutch population. These churches have either been the result of conflicts within the Calvinist Church or have been imported, mainly from the United States. Other Christians (Eastern Orthodox and Restorationists) make up only a small percentage. The remaining 7.7% of the population are members of another religion, such as Islam (5.8%), Hinduism, Judaism, Baháʼí, Buddhism, or indigenous religions.

Different sources give very different percentages. in 2006, fewer than 7% attend church or mosque regularly (at least once a month). Similar studies were done in 1966, 1979, and 1996, showing a steady decline of religious affiliation. That this trend is likely to continue is illustrated by the fact that in the age group under 35, 69% are non-affiliated. However, those who are religious tend to be more profoundly religious than in the past. Religious belief is also regarded as a very personal affair, as is illustrated by the fact that 60% of self-described believers are not affiliated with any organized religion. There is stronger stress on the positive sides of belief, with Hell and the concept of damnation being pushed into the background. 53% of the Dutch population believe in a form of life after death, of which a third believe in some kind of heaven (with or without a god), but with only 4% believing in Hell. Of the entire population, 10% believe in a reunion of family and loved ones, and 10% in the survival of the spirit, soul or consciousness. Of the people who answer positively to whether they believe there is life after death, 15% think of the afterlife as "living on in the memory of others". Furthermore, 6% believe in reincarnation generally, and 5% in reincarnation in human form exclusively. One-quarter of non-believers sometimes pray, but more in a sense of meditative self-reflection. Atheism, agnosticism, and Christian atheism are also on the rise, and are becoming broadly accepted. The expected rise of spirituality (ietsism) has come to a halt according to research in 2015. In 2006 40% of respondents considered themselves spiritual, while by 2015 this had dropped to 31%. The number who believed in the existence of a higher power (theists and certain ietsists) fell from 36% to 28% over the same period.

Research done in 2015 by Ton Bernts and Joantine Berghuijs concluded that 67.8% of the Dutch population consider themselves to be irreligious. In 2006, 51% of the Dutch population were still affiliated church members. In 2015 only 25% of the population adheres to one of the Christian churches, 4% is Muslim and 2% adheres to Hinduism Budism, based on in-depth interviews. In 2015, the vast majority of the inhabitants of the Netherlands (82%) claim they never or almost never visit a church, and 59% stated they have never been to a church of any kind. Of all the people questioned, 25% see themselves as atheists, an increase of 11% compared to the previous study done in 2006.

==== Member loss of Christian groups 2003–2013 according to church reports ====
Almost all Christian groups show a decrease in the number of members or less stable membership. However, in particular, the loss of members of the two major churches is noticeable, namely the Roman Catholic Church in the Netherlands, with a membership loss of approximately 589,500 members between 2003 (4,532,000 people, or 27.9% of the population) and 2013 (3,943,000 people, or 23.3%), and the Protestant Church in the Netherlands, with a membership loss of 737,174 members between 2003 (1,823,085 people, or 11.2% of the population, for the Dutch Reformed Church; 623,100 people or 3.8% for the Reformed Churches in the Netherlands; and 11,989 people or 0.07% for the Evangelical Lutheran Church in the Kingdom of the Netherlands; total for these churches of 2,458,174 people, or 15.15% of the population) and 2012 (Protestant Church in the Netherlands, 1,721,000 people or 10.2% of the population). Smaller churches (Mennonite Church in the Netherlands, Remonstrants, and the Old Catholic Church) had a total number of 22,489 members (0.13% of the population) in 2003, which dropped to 17,852 members (0.10% of the population) in 2012. In total, the number of members of Christian groups in the Netherlands decreased from 7,013,163 (43.22% of the population) in 2003 to 5,730,852 (34.15% of the population) in 2013. This accounts for a total member loss of 1,282,311 (9.7% overall population) of all churches in the Netherlands within these 10 years. These numbers are based on information by KASKI (Katholiek Sociaal-Kerkelijk Insituut / Catholic Social-Ecclesiastical Institute), which in turn bases its numbers on information provided by the churches themselves. Independent research in 2015 by the VU University Amsterdam and Radboud University shows significantly lower numbers concerning the percentage of the Dutch population that adheres to almost all the churches named here.

== Irreligion ==
In December 2014, for the first time there were more atheists (25%) than theists (17%) in the Netherlands, with majority of the population being agnostic (31%) or spiritual but not religious (27%). In 2016, irreligious people rose to 50% of the population in the Netherlands, and this number rose to a majority of 51% in 2018.

A 2015 survey showed that 63% of Dutch people thought that religion does more harm than good. Not all respondents agreed with the statement that religion does more harm to the same degree. Most respondents (26%) agreed "a little". 19% of respondents "agreed" with the statement and another 18% "agreed completely". Atheists (25% of Dutch people) see the most harm in religion. Of this group, 88% agreed that religion does more harm than good. The study showed that the more faithful someone is, the less likely that person is to believe religion does more harm than good. Of the faithful, 21% believe that religion has a more damaging than beneficial effect. A quarter of the population thinks that morality is threatened if no one believes in God, down from 40% in 2006. The number of people reporting that they never pray rose from 36% in 2006 to 53% in 2016.

According to the reports from the Dutch Sociaal en Cultureel Planbureau, the percentage of Dutch people that believe in God is decreasing over time. This is happening due to how in previous years many Dutch knew the idea of God and chose to not follow a religion. Now as they continue to have children, the younger children are having no exposure to religion at all, indicating they are becoming agnostic. Based on the research SCP has done, this leads to an increase in the number of mental burnouts as atheists and agnostics have to give meaning to their own lives. It does not mean they are unhappy, but they must create a meaning in their personal lives, while others prefer to not think about it.

Pew Research Centre in 2018 discovered that 53% of Dutch in the Netherlands selected "Do not believe in God".

== Minority religions ==
=== Christianity ===
==== Catholicism ====
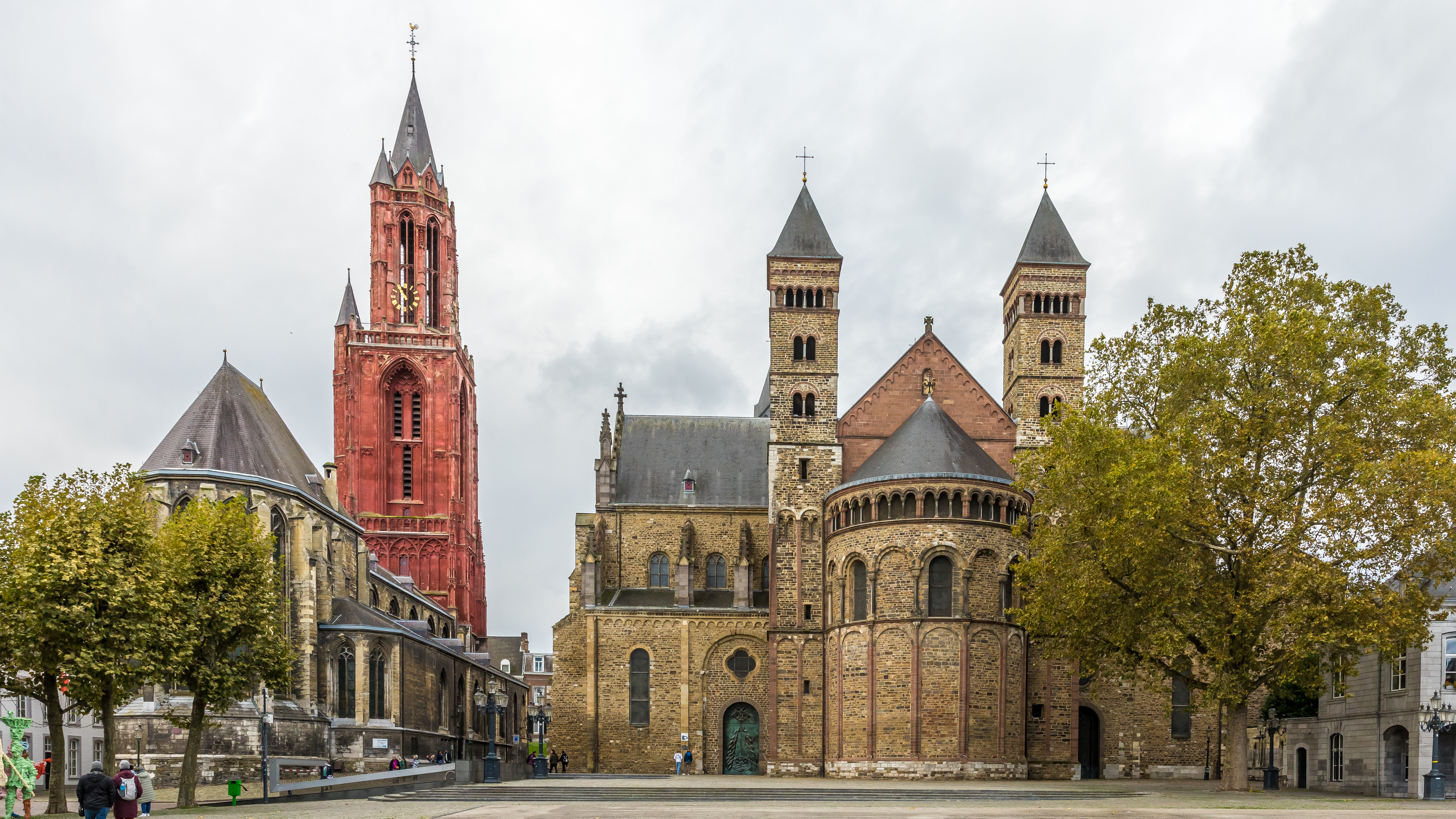
Basilica of Saint Servatius (built 570) in Maastricht is the oldest church in the Netherlands

Distribution map pillarised first names
Catholic vs Protestant

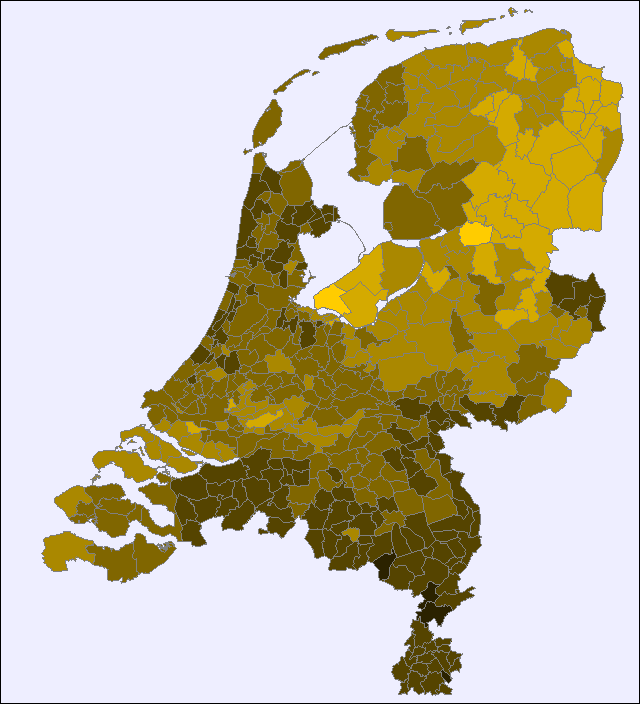
Elisabeth

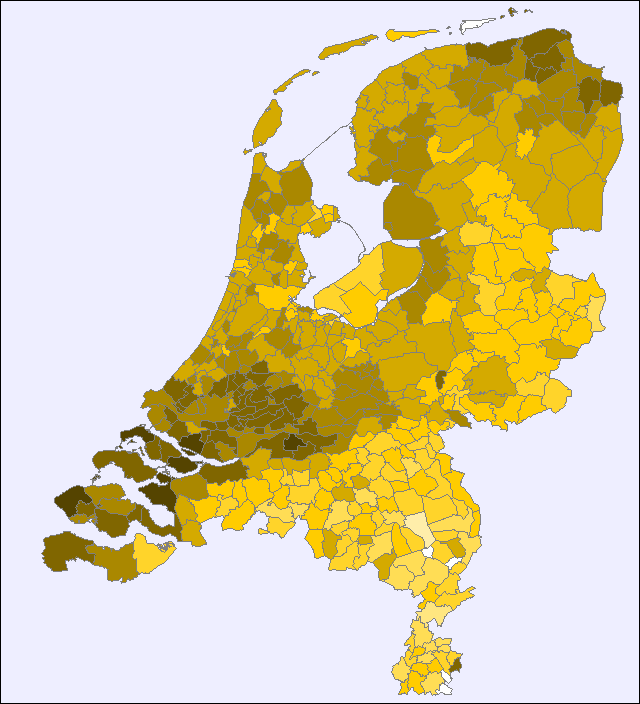
Elizabeth

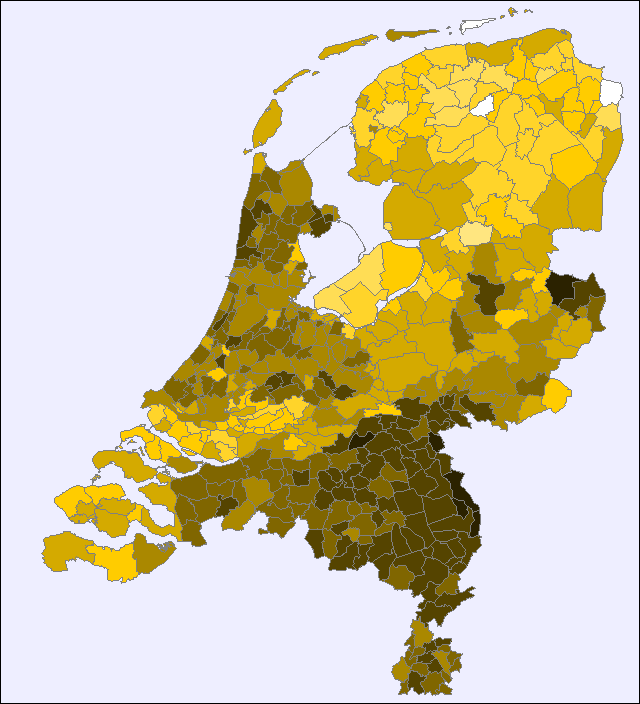
Gerardus

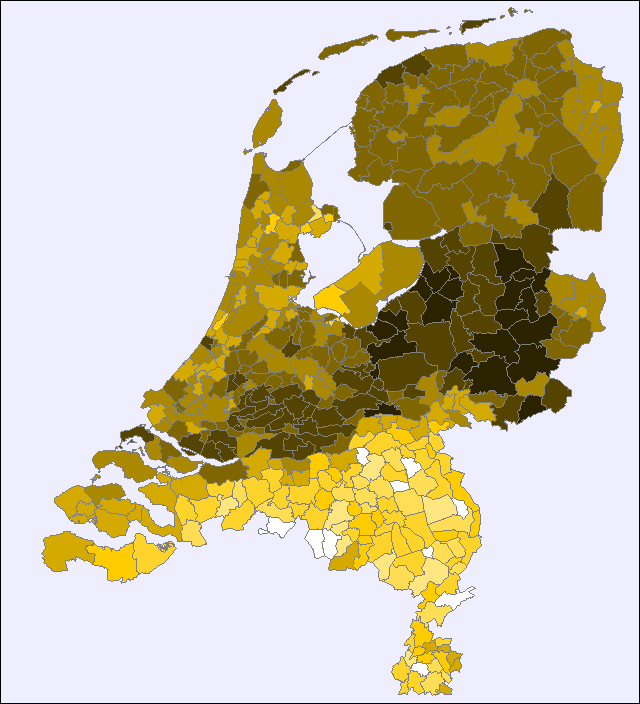
Gerrit

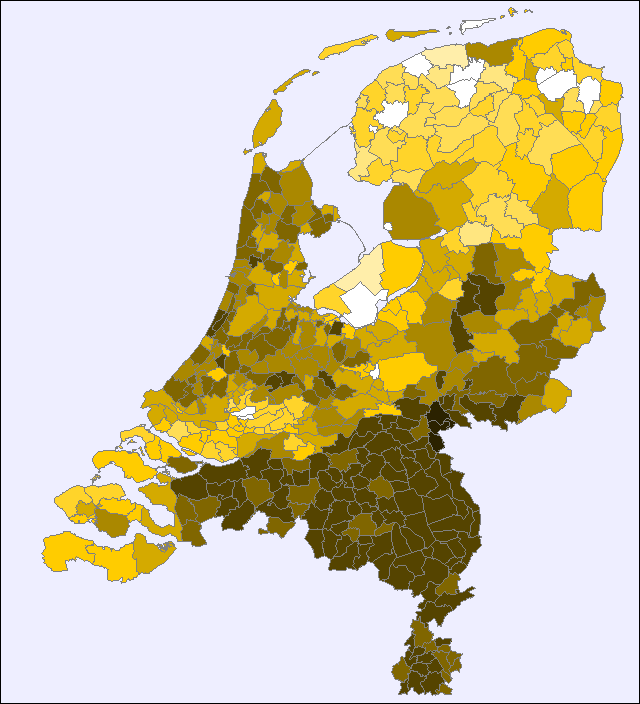
Wilhelmus

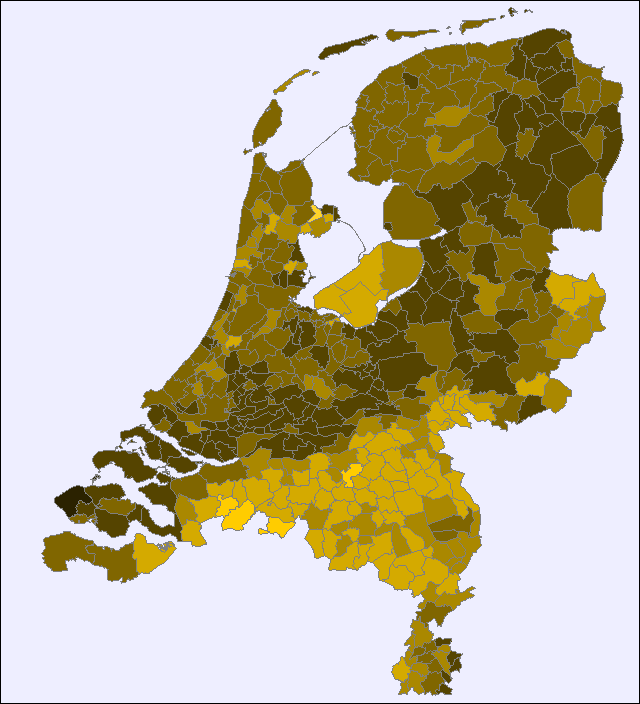
Willem

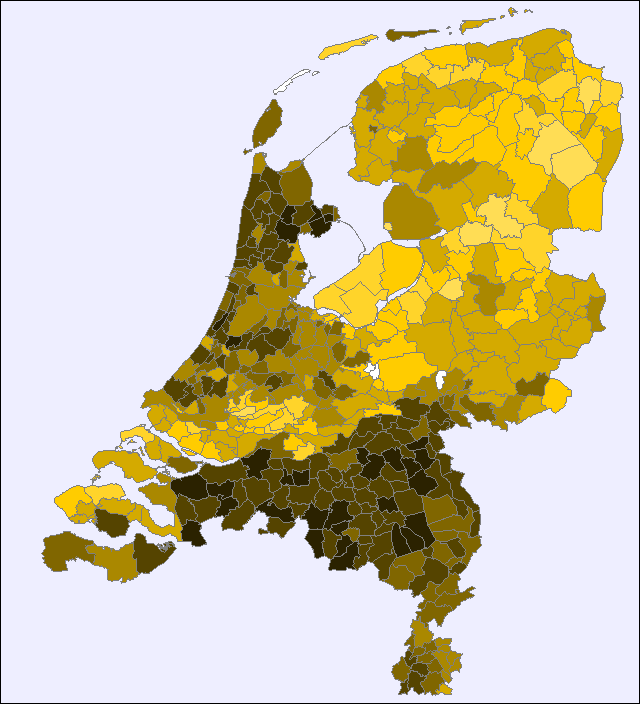
Petrus

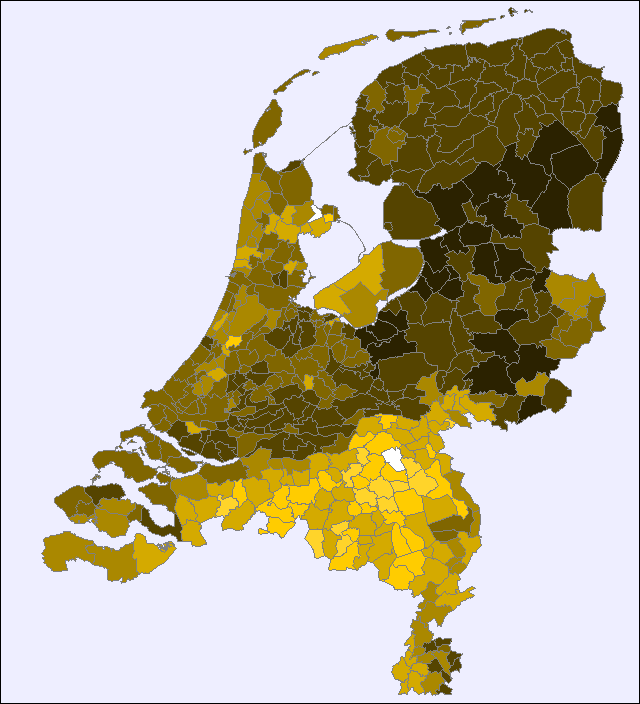
Hendrik

Currently, Catholicism is the single largest Christian denomination of the Netherlands, forming some 18.3% of the Dutch people in 2021, down from 40% in the 1960s. According to the church itself, 20.8% of the Dutch population were formal members in 2021.

After 1970, the emphasis on Catholic concepts such as hell, the Devil, sin, divorce and remarriage, confession, the teaching of the catechism and receiving the eucharist rapidly disappeared, and these concepts are nowadays seldom or not at all found within contemporary Dutch Catholicism. In the 1980s and 1990s, the church became polarized between conservatives, whose main organization was the Contact Roman Catholics (Dutch: "Contact Rooms-Katholieken"), and liberals, whose main organization was the Eighth of May Movement (Dutch: "Acht Mei-beweging"), which was founded in 1985. The latter organization had a difficult relationship with Church bishops and was disbanded in 2003. As of 2014, Cardinal Willem Jacobus Eijk, the Archbishop of Utrecht, is the highest Catholic authority.

In December 2011, a report was published by Wim Deetman, a former Dutch minister, detailing widespread child abuse within the Catholic Church in the Netherlands. 1,800 incidents of abuse "by clergy or volunteers within Dutch Catholic dioceses" were reported to have occurred since 1945. According to the report, "The risk of experiencing unwanted sexual advances was twice as great for minors in institutions as the national average of 9.7%. This finding reveals no significant difference between Roman Catholic institutions and other institutions." In March 2012, however, it was revealed that cases of 10 children being chemically castrated after reporting being sexually abused to the police had come to light. It also emerged that in 1956 former prime minister Victor Marijnen, then chairman of a children's home in Gelderland, had covered up the sexual abuse of children. According to the De Telegraaf newspaper, he "intervened to have prison sentences dropped against several priests convicted of abusing children." The Commission rejected all the claims.

The number of Catholics is not only declining, but many people who identify themselves as Catholics also do not regularly attend Sunday Mass. 153,800 people attended Mass in a regular weekend in 2018 according to information by the Catholic Institute for Ecclesiastical Statistics (KASKI). Most Catholics live in the southern provinces of North Brabant and Limburg, where they comprise a majority of the population in the diocese of Roermond in the province of Limburg, based on self-reported information by the Catholic Church.

According to the church administration in 2010, the population of two dioceses, 's-Hertogenbosch and Roermond, were still majority Roman Catholic. However, based on the conflicting SILA numbers, the diocese of 's-Hertogenbosch had already lost its Catholic majority. The church administration only announced 's-Hertogenbosch losing a Catholic majority in 2014.

The number of parishes in the Netherlands has dropped between 2003 and 2021 from 1525 to 641. The number of churches used for Catholic liturgy dropped in the same period from 1,782 to 1,303.

A planned visit by Pope Francis to the Netherlands was blocked by cardinal Wim Eijk in 2014, allegedly because of the feared lack of interest in the Pope among the Dutch public. The vast majority of the Catholic population in the Netherlands is now largely irreligious in practice. Research among self-identified Catholics in the Netherlands, published in 2007, shows that only 27% of the Dutch Catholics can be regarded as a theist, 55% as an ietsist, deist or agnostic and 17% as atheist. In 2015 only 13% of self-identified Dutch Catholics believe in the existence of heaven, 17% in a personal God and fewer than half believe that Jesus was the Son of God or sent by God.

Notable Dutch Catholics include Pope Adrian VI, Erasmus of Rotterdam, Ruud Lubbers, Henry of Gorkum, Cornelius Loos, Jakob Middendorp, Hadewijch, Hieronymus Bosch, Piet de Jong, Jan Harmenszoon Krul, Dries van Agt, Jan Steen, Casimir Ubaghs, Maxime Verhagen, and Joan Albert Ban.

==== Protestantism ====
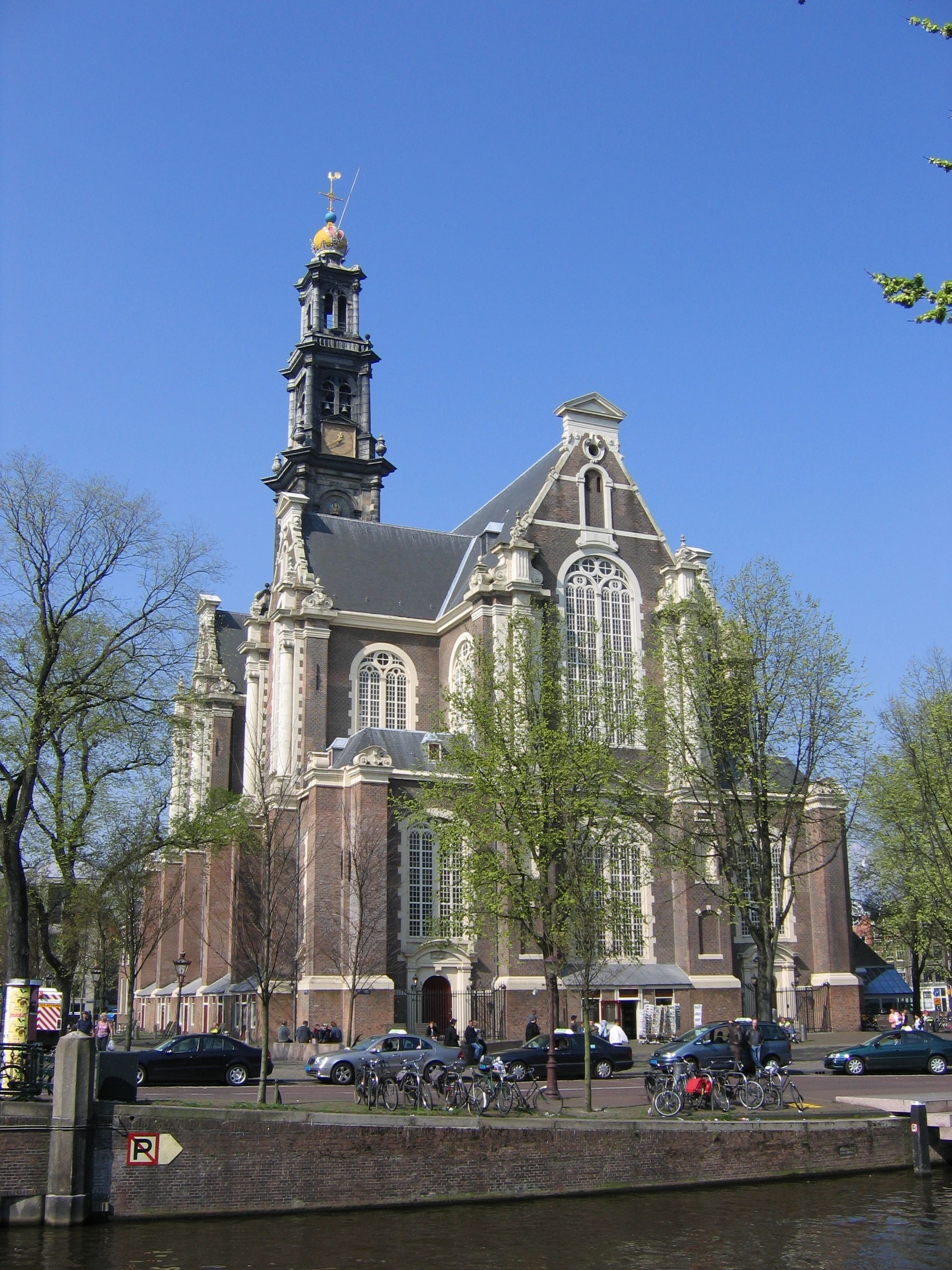
Westerkerk in Amsterdam

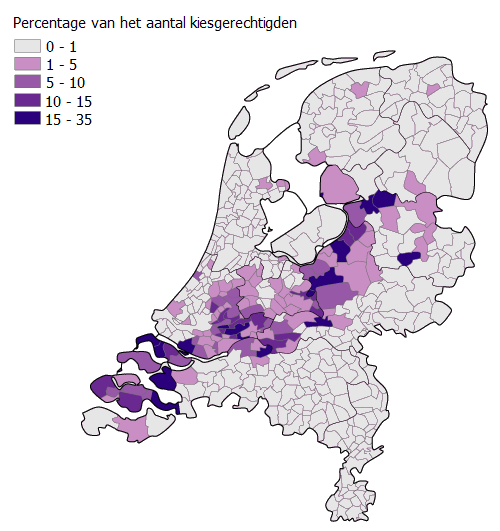
The Dutch Bible Belt with a relatively large minority of orthodox Calvinists (2010 data). The map displays the percentage of votes for the Staatkundig Gereformeerde Partij, an orthodox protestant political party, in the national elections in 2010

The Protestant Church of the Netherlands (PKN) forms by far the largest Protestant denomination, with some 15.5% of the population in 2015, down from 60% in the early 20th century. According to the church itself, formal membership was 9.1% of the Dutch population in 2017.

The PKN was formed in 2004 as a merger of the two major strands of Calvinism: the Dutch Reformed Church (which then represented roughly 8.5% of the population) and the Reformed Churches in the Netherlands (then 3.7% of the population), plus a smaller Lutheran Church, the Evangelical Lutheran Church in the Kingdom of the Netherlands (0.1%). Since the 1970s, these three churches had seen a major decline in adherents and had begun to work together. The PKN itself claims that 9.1% of the Dutch population is a member in 2016. About 4% of newborns were baptized within the PKN in 2014. The Church embraces religious pluralism. Research shows that 42% of the members of the PKN are non-theist. Furthermore, in the Protestant Church in the Netherlands (PKN) and several other smaller denominations of the Netherlands, 1 in 6 members of the clergy report being either agnostic or atheist. The percentage of the Dutch population who are members decreases by about 2.5% per year. This is caused primarily by the conflux of older members dying off and little growth amongst the younger population.

A large number of Protestant churches, mostly orthodox Calvinist splits and liberal churches, stayed out of the PKN. They represented some 4% of the population in 2004. Calvinism is the traditional faith of the Dutch royal family – a remnant of the church's historical dominance.

The Bible Belt (De Bijbelgordel in Dutch) is the name given to a strip of land in the Netherlands, after the Bible Belt of the United States. The belt is inhabited by a large number of conservative Protestants. The Bible Belt stretches from Zeeland, through the West-Betuwe and Veluwe, to the northern parts of the province Overijssel. However, some communities with strong conservative Protestant leanings are situated outside the belt. For example, Urk, considered by many as one of the most traditional communities in the country, and some municipalities of Friesland have characteristics typical of the Bible Belt. Other places in this area are Yerseke, Tholen, Ouddorp, Opheusden, Kesteren, Barneveld, Nunspeet, Elspeet and Staphorst. The three biggest cities regarded to be part of the Bible Belt are Ede, Veenendaal and Kampen.

A 2015 study estimates some 4,500 Christian believers from a Muslim background in the country, most of them belonging to some form of Protestantism.

Chart of splits and mergers of the Dutch Reformed churches

Splits and mergers of the Dutch Reformed churches

NHK (1571)
Remonstrants (1619)
Afgescheidenen (1834)
Christian Seceded Churches (1838)	Reformed Churches under the Cross (1838)
Ledeboerians (1841)
CGK (1869)
NGK (Dolerenden) (1886)
GKN (1892)
Old Reformed Federation (1907)	GerGem (1907)	Boone Con. (1907)
GKHV (1926)
GKv (1944)
NHK (1946)
OGGN (1948)
GGiN (1953)
NGK (1967)
GGiN (unconnected) (1980)
DGK (2003)
HHK (2004)	VGKN (2004)
ELKKN
PKN (2004)
GKN (2009)
NGK (2023)
GK (2024)

==== Other Christians ====
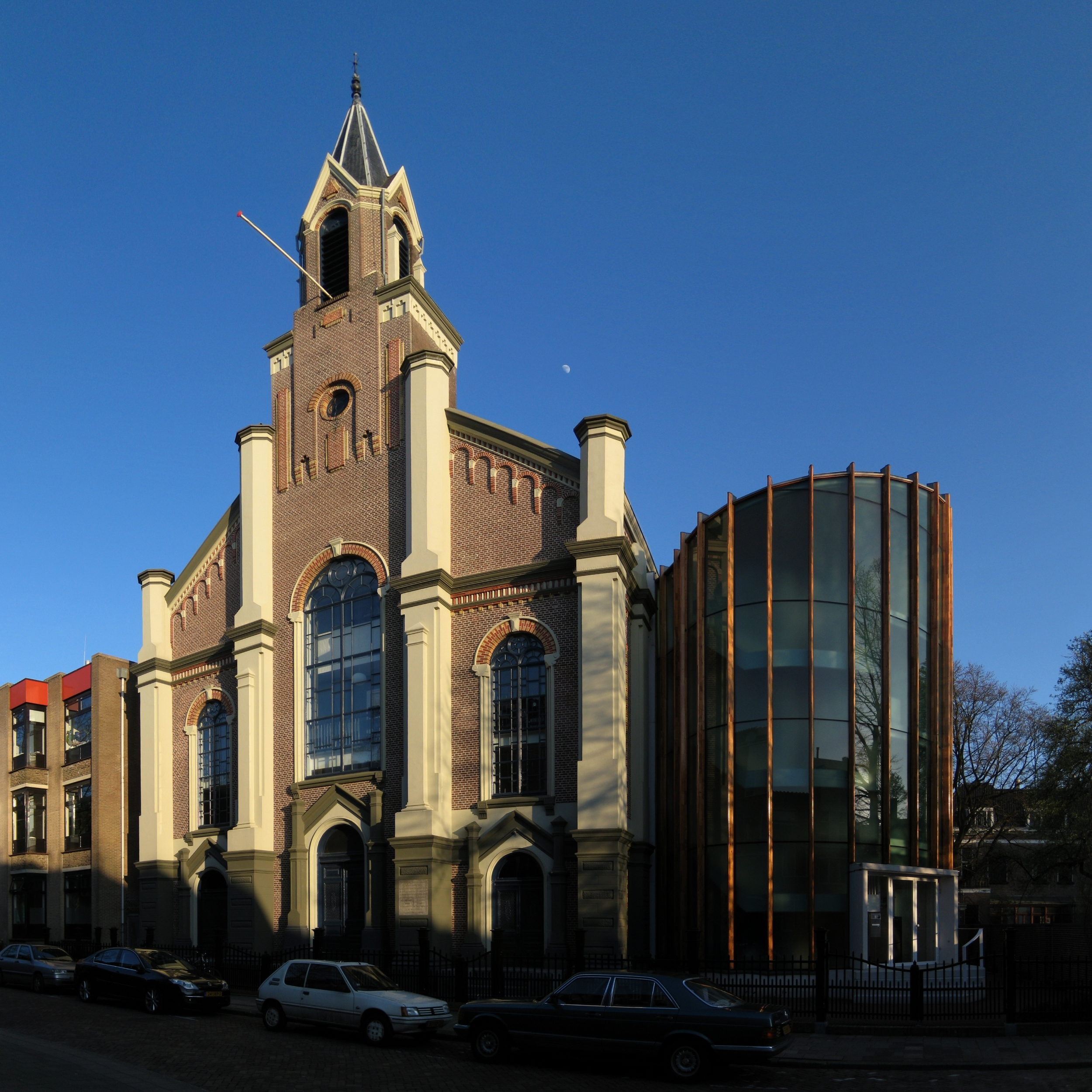
Remonstrant church in Groningen

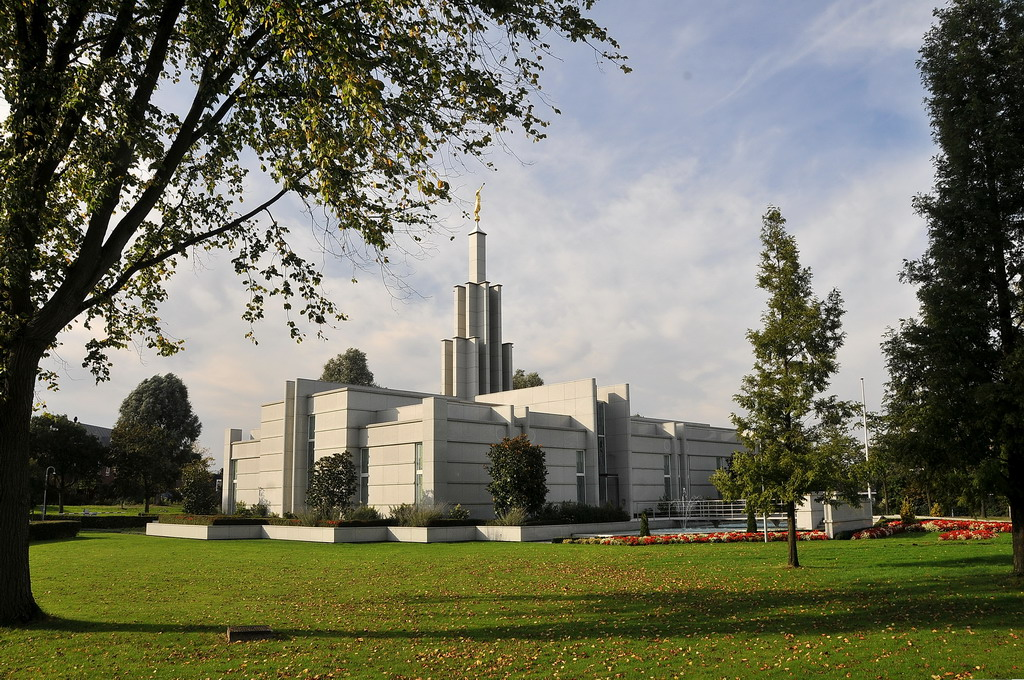
The Hague Netherlands Temple of the Church of Jesus Christ of Latter-day Saints

- Calvinism:
  - Restored Reformed Church
  - Continued Reformed Churches in the Netherlands
  - Christian Reformed Churches
  - Reformed Congregations
  - Reformed Congregations in the Netherlands
  - Old-Reformed Congregations in the Netherlands
  - Dutch Reformed Churches
  - Reformed Churches
- Mennonite Church in the Netherlands
- Remonstrant Brotherhood
- Baptists:
  - Union of Baptist Churches in the Netherlands
  - Brotherhood of Baptist Churches
  - Independent Free Baptist Churches
- Lutheranism:
  - League of Free Evangelical Parishes
  - Evangelical Brotherhood
- Oriental Orthodox Churches
  - Syriac Orthodox Church
  - Coptic Orthodox Church
  - Armenian Apostolic Church
- Restorationism:
  - The Church of Jesus Christ of Latter-day Saints
  - Jehovah’s Witnesses
  - New Apostolic Church
  - Seventh-day Adventist Church
- Pentecostalism:
  - Apostolic Community
  - United Pentecostal and Evangelical Churches
- Anglicanism: Church of England
- Dispensationalism: Gathering of Religious
- Methodism:
  - Salvation Army
  - Church of the Nazarene
- Old Catholic: Old Catholic Church of the Netherlands
- Quakerism
- Zwinglianism: Zwingli Union
- Eastern Orthodox Church

=== Islam ===
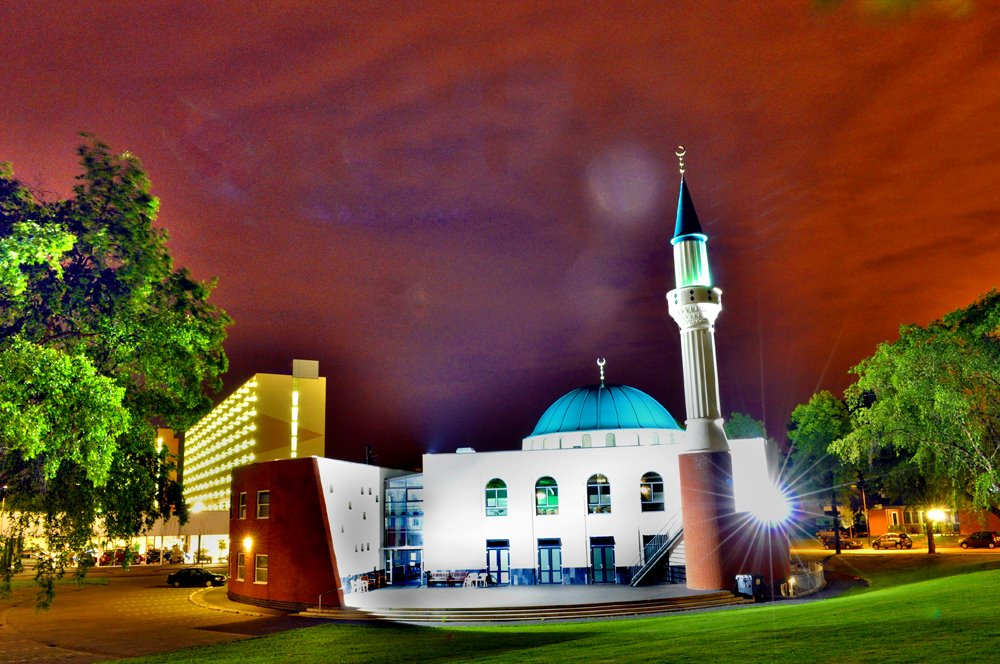
Ulu Mosque in Bergen op Zoom

Islam is a relatively new religion in the Netherlands. In 2015, 4.9% of the Dutch population were Muslims.

The majority of Muslims in the Netherlands belong to the Sunni denomination, with a sizeable Shia minority. Muslim numbers began to rise after the 1960s as the result of immigration. Some migrants from former Dutch colonies, such as Suriname and Indonesia, are Muslim. Migrant workers from Turkey and Morocco and their children make up the most substantial part of the Muslim population of the Netherlands.

During the 1990s, the Netherlands received Muslim refugees from countries like Bosnia and Herzegovina, Somalia, Iraq, Iran and Afghanistan. Of the immigrant ethnic groups, 100% of Bosniaks; 99% of Moroccans; 90% of Turks; 69% of Asians; 64% of other Africans, and 12% of Surinamese were Muslims. Muslims form a diverse group. Social tensions between native Dutch and migrant Muslims began to rise in the early 21st century. Politician Pim Fortuyn being murdered by progressivist extremist Volkert van der Graaf in 2002 made his anti-Islamic opinions dominant. This was reinforced in 2004 by the murder of Theo van Gogh by extremist Muslim Mohammed Bouyeri, part of the Hofstad Network. After 2009, the Party for Freedom, with considerable electoral success, demanded a ban of the Quran, closure of all mosques and a forced remigration of those Muslims who had not assimilated into the Dutch culture.

There has been criticism of governments of Muslim-majority countries financing mosques as this allegedly would slow integration in the Dutch society.

=== Judaism ===
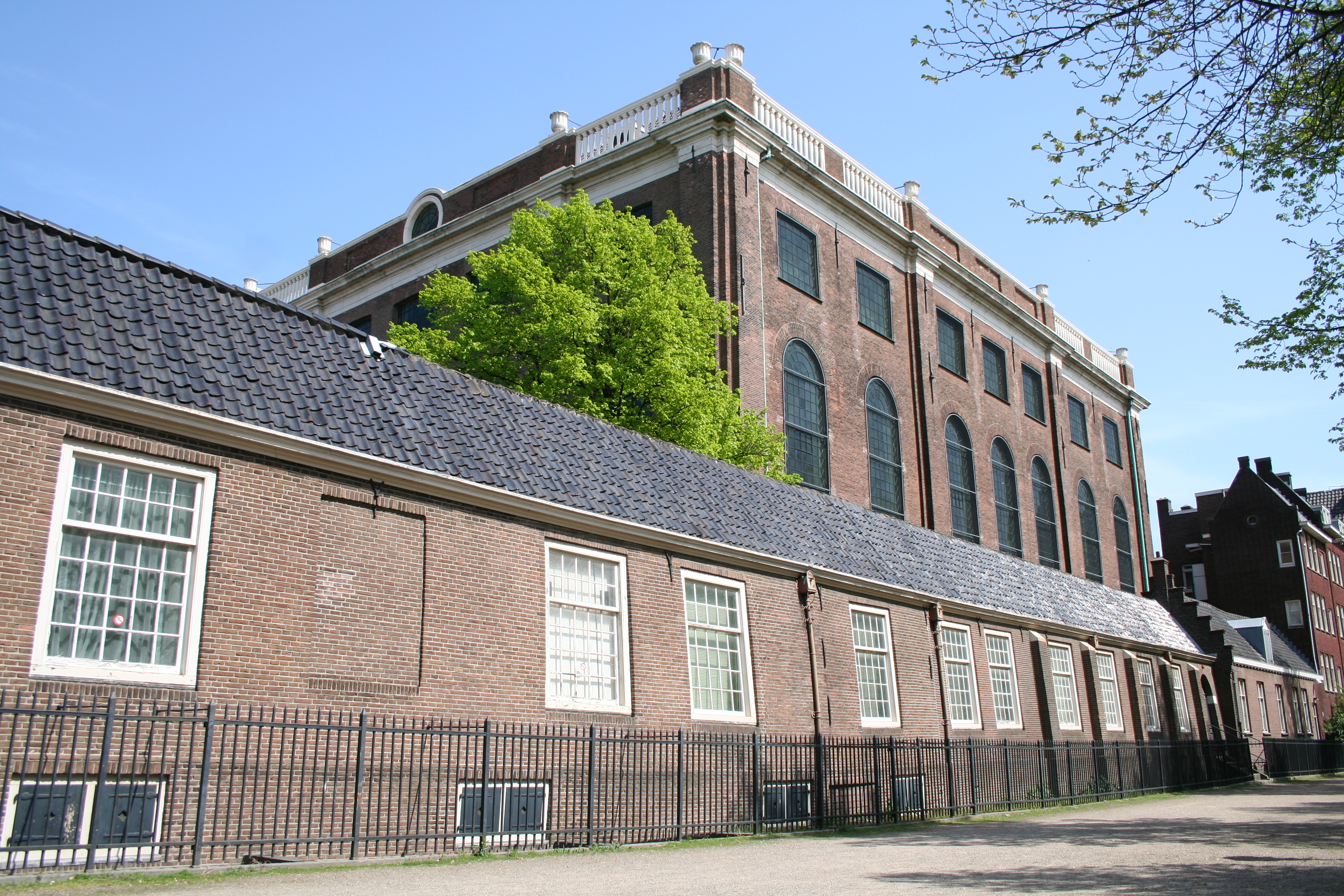
The Portuguese Synagogue (built 1675) in Amsterdam is the oldest synagogue in the Netherlands.

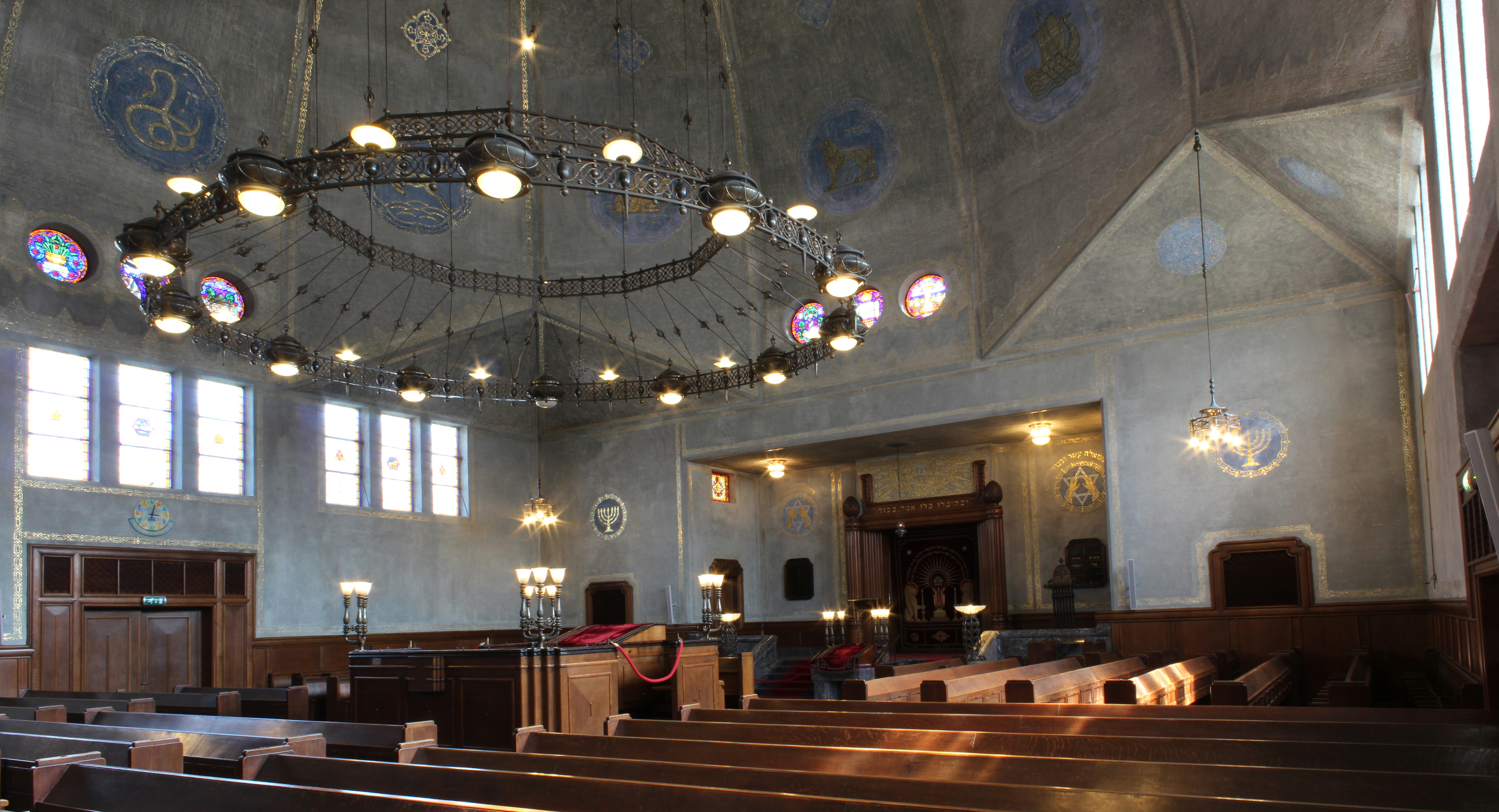
Interior of the synagogue of Enschede

Religious Jews represent 0.1% of the Dutch population in 2015. Because of its social tolerance, the Dutch Republic formed a haven for Jews that were persecuted because of their beliefs throughout Europe. Prominent Dutch Jews include Baruch Spinoza, a 17th-century philosopher, Aletta Jacobs, a 19th-century feminist, and Henri Polak, who founded both the socialist party SDAP and the labor union NVV. The majority of Jews lived in Amsterdam, where they formed an eighth (90,000) of the population. During the Second World War, about 75% of Dutch Jews were deported and murdered in The Holocaust.

The Jewish Communities in the Netherlands, the Dutch Union for Progressive Judaism, and the Portuguese Israelite Religious Community are three organizations of Jews in the country.

=== Hinduism ===
Hinduism is a minority religion in the Netherlands, representing 0.6% of the Dutch population in 2015. Most of these are relatively recent first or second-generation Indo-Surinamese immigrants, South Asians who had been resident in the former Dutch colony of Suriname and traveled to the Netherlands in the 1970s and 1980s. There are also sizable populations of Hindu immigrants from India and Sri Lanka, as well as a smaller number of Western adherents of Hinduism-oriented new religious movements.

=== Buddhism ===
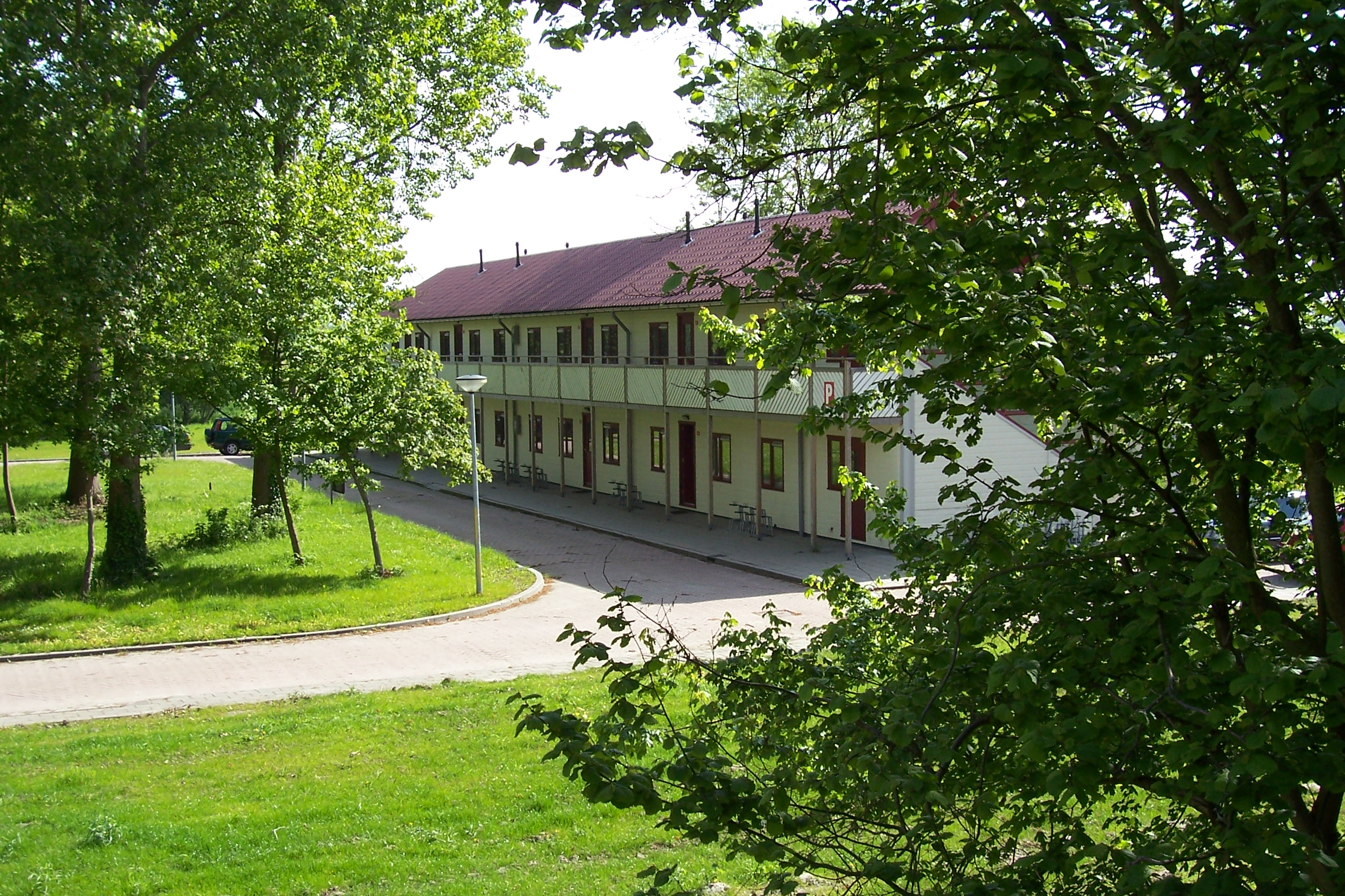
Naropa Institute of Tibetan Buddhism in Cadzand

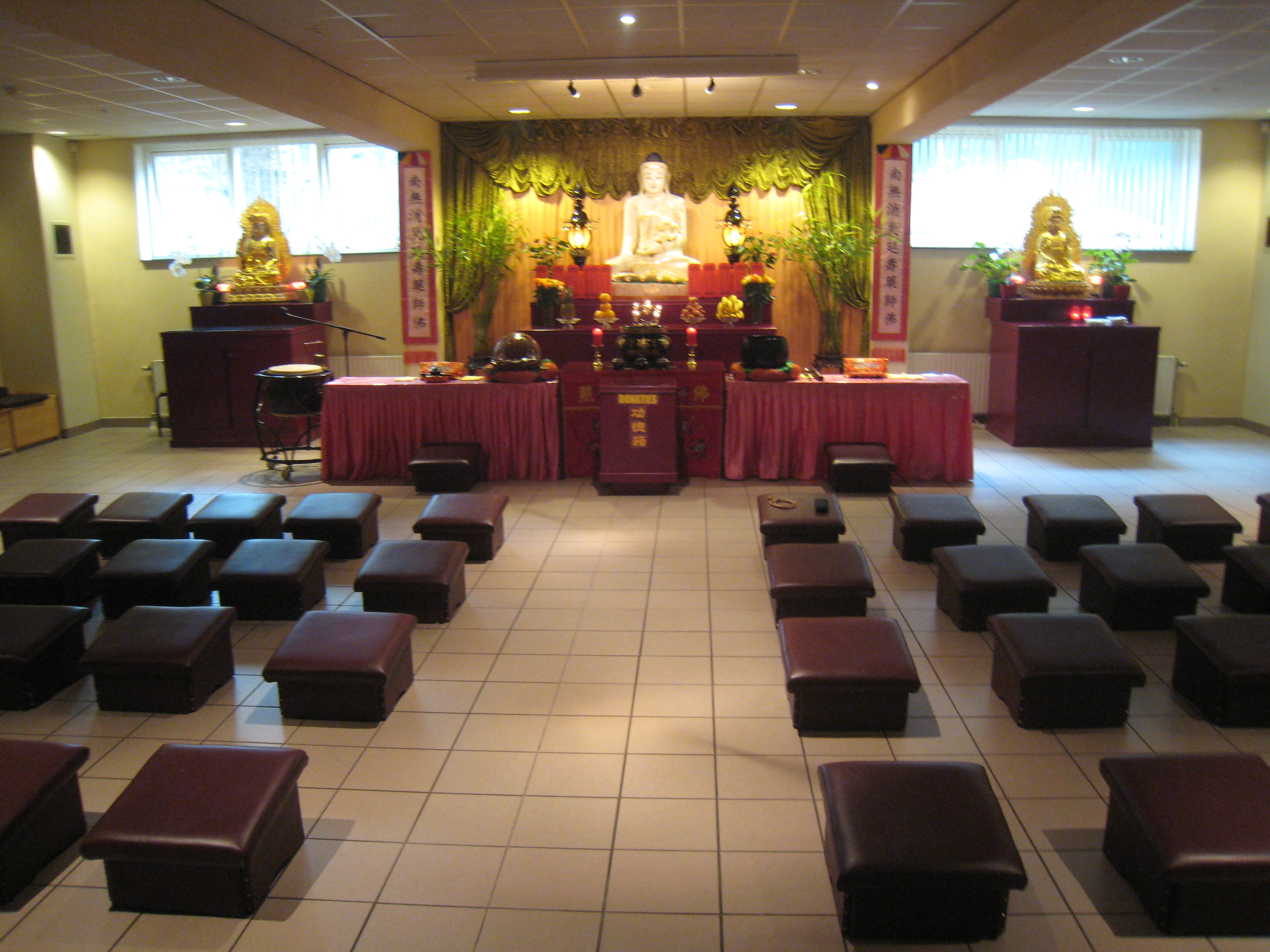
He Hua Temple of the Chinese community in Amsterdam

Buddhists represent 0.4% of the Dutch population in 2015.

=== Baháʼí Faith ===
The first mentions of the Baháʼí Faith in the Netherlands were in 1852, when newspapers covered some of the events relating to the Bábí movement, which the Baháʼí Faith regards as a precursor religion. Circa 1904 Algemeen Handelsblad, an Amsterdam newspaper, sent a correspondent to investigate the Baháʼís in Persia. The first Baháʼís to settle in the Netherlands were a couple of families — the Tijssens and Greevens, both of whom left Germany for the Netherlands in 1937, as their business practices were affected by Nazi policies. Following World War II, the Baháʼís established a committee to oversee introducing the religion across Europe. The growth of the Baháʼí community in the Netherlands began as a result, with Baháʼí pioneers arriving in 1946. Following their arrival and the conversions of some citizens, the first Baháʼí Local Spiritual Assembly of Amsterdam was elected in 1948. In 1957, with 110 Baháʼís and nine spiritual assemblies, the Baháʼí community in the Netherlands first elected its own National Spiritual Assembly. In 2010 there were about 6,700 Baháʼís in the Netherlands. In 2005 the Netherlands had 34 local spiritual assemblies.

== Demographics ==
=== Religious affiliation by year (1830–2025) ===
==== Table ====
Historical development of the religious affiliation of the Netherlands
Year	Most (Note: Provided statistics show Protestants by their allegiance to congregations of two denominations that do not exist anymore. In 2004, the Dutch Reformed Church (NHK), the Reformed Churches in the Netherlands (GKN) and the Evangelical Lutheran Church in the Kingdom of the Netherlands merged to form the Protestant Church in the Netherlands (PKN) and officially no longer exist. However, many people still tend to give their older affiliation even after the merger. People who declared themselves simply as belonging to the Protestant Church in the Netherlands did not give information about belonging to an older affiliation. Lutherans happened to do so. People who identified with one of those three categories (NHK/GKN/or simply PKN) are all members of the Protestant Church in the Netherlands.) Protestants	Roman Catholics	Jews	Muslims	Other Christians /religions	No religion
1830	59.1%	40.8%	1.8%	-	0.1%	-
1840	59.6%	40.3%	1.8%	-	0.1%	-
1849	59.7%	38.4%	1.9%	-	0.1%	-
1859	60.6%	37.4%	1.9%	-	0.1%	-
1869	61.3%	36.6%	1.9%	-	0.1%	-
1879	61.6%	36.1%	2.0%	0.0%	0.0%	0.3%
1889	60.5%	35.6%	2.2%	0.0%	0.4%	1.5%
1899	60.0%	35.3%	2.0%	-	0.4%	2.3%
1909	57.3%	35.2%	1.8%	0.0%	0.7%	5.0%
1920	53.8%	35.8%	1.7%	-	1.0%	7.8%
1930	46.3%	36.5%	1.4%	-	1.4%	14.4%
1947	42.3%	38.6%	0.1%	-	1.9%	17.1%
1960	40.7%	40.5%	0.1%	0.0%	0.2%	18.3%
1971	35.9%	40.5%	0.1%	0.4%	0.3%	23.6%
1975	33%	38%	-	-	3%	26%
1977	31%	38%	-	-	3%	26%
1980	30%	38%	-	-	5%	26%
1983	29%	36%	-	-	6%	30%
1985	28%	37%	-	-	5%	31%
1990	26%	33%	-	-	6%	38%
1995	21%	33%	-	-	8%	40%
2000	21%	32%	-	-	8%	40%
2005	21%	30%	-	-	9%	41%
2010	17.9%	27.3%	0.1%	4.5%	5.1%	45.3%
2011	16.8%	26.5%	0.1%	4.7%	5.1%	46.8%
2012	16.7%	25.8%	0.1%	4.8%	5.2%	47.4%
2013	16.1%	26.3%	0.1%	4.8%	5.9%	46.9%
2014	15.8%	24.4%	0.1%	4.9%	5.6%	49.2%
2015	15.5%	23.7%	0.1%	4.9%	5.6%	50.1%
2016	15.6%	24.1%	-	5.1%	5.5%	49.7%
2017	15.0%	23.6%	-	5.1%	5.6%	50.7%
2018	16.0%	22.1%	-	4.9%	5.3%	51.8%
2019	14.8%	20.1%	-	5.0%	5.9%	54.1%
2020	14.4%	19.8%	-	5.1%	5.2%	55.4%
2021	13.6%	18.3%	-	4.6%	6.1%	57.5%
2022	13.2%	18.2%	-	5.6%	5.9%	57.2%
2023	13%	17%	-	6%	6%	58%
2024	14%	17%	-	6%	7%	56%
2025	12%	16%	-	6%	7%	58%

Sources:

- 1830–1971 Censuses (18+): www.volkstellingen.nl
- 1975–2005 (18+) Statistics Netherlands' historical data, 1849-2015
- 2010–2015: (18+)
- 2016–2021: (15+)
- 2022: (15+)
- 2023: (15+)
- 2024: (15+)
- 2025: (15+)

=== Other surveys ===
Beliefs in the Netherlands (2015), based on in-depth interviewing by Radboud University and Vrije Universiteit Amsterdam
1. Atheism (24%)
2. Agnosticism (34%)
3. Ietsism (28%)
4. Theism (14%)
- According to an independent in-depth interview series by Radboud University and Vrije Universiteit Amsterdam in 2006, 34% of the Dutch population identified as Christian, decreasing till in 2015 just under 25% of the population adhered to one of the Christian faiths (11.7% Roman Catholic, 8.6% Protestants, 4.2% other small Christian denominations), 5% were Muslims and 2% Hindus or Buddhists. Approximately 67.8% of the population in 2015 had no religious affiliation, up from 61% in 2006, 53% in 1996, 43% in 1979, and 33% in 1966.
- KASKI (Katholiek Sociaal-Kerkelijk Insituut / Catholic Social-Ecclesiastical Institute) found 23.3% of the population to be nominally Catholic in 2014, and 10% to be members of the Protestant Church in the Netherlands, based on information provided by the Catholic and Protestant churches. These numbers are significantly higher than the numbers of adherents found by Radboud University and Vrije Universiteit Amsterdam. This shows a significant disconnect between membership and actual adherence. In particular, the Catholic Church often claims that a quarter of the Dutch population is Catholic, pointing to the official stats; however, in population surveys, fewer than half that number associate themselves with the Catholic faith. A significant proportion of the nominally religious Dutch population have secularized without renouncing their faith, a phenomenon known as "belonging without believing". According to KASKI, the total number of members of Christian groups in the Netherlands has decreased from approximately 7,013,163 (43.22% of the overall population) in 2003 to 5,730,852 (34.15% of the overall population) in 2013.
- According to Eurobarometer 2012, 44% of Dutch residents were Christian. Catholics were the largest Christian group in the Netherlands, accounting for 22% of Dutch citizens, while Protestants made up 15% and other Christians made up 7%. Irreligious people and agnostics accounted for 41%, atheists accounted for 8%, and Muslims for 1%.
- A December 2014 survey by VU University Amsterdam found that for the first time there were more atheists (25%) than theists (17%) in the Netherlands, with the majority of the population being agnostic (31%) or ietsistic (27%).

Beliefs in the Netherland (2019), survey by Statistics Netherlands (CBS)	%
Atheism: "I don't believe in God."	33.2
Theism:	31.7
"I believe in God."	24.6
"I believe in God, although I have my doubts."	7.1
Agnosticism: "I don't know if there is a God and I don't believe there is any way to find out."	14.8
Ietsism: "I don't believe in a personal God, but I do believe in some higher power."	14.0
Undecided: "Sometimes I believe in God, sometimes I don't."	6.3

=== Religion and religiosity by Dutch region ===
Religion and religiosity in the Netherlands greatly differ between different communities in the country and even at regional levels within the provinces. Urk is the most religious municipality, with 97.7% of its population religious (gelovig) whereas Menterwolde is the least religious at only 15.8%. The table below details religiosity by every statistical region:

Religious involvement per COROP region in the Netherlands (2021)
Province	Region	Religious (overall)	Catholic	Protestant	Islam	Other	Regular visit to places of worship
-	Netherlands (average)	49.3%	23.2%	15.6%	4.9%	5.7%	15.3%
Groningen	East Groningen	31.4%	5.8%	19.0%	1.3%	5.2%	12.3%
Groningen	Greater Delfzijl	40.5%	3.3%	26.7%	3.1%	7.4%	17.4%
Groningen	Rest of Groningen	35.6%	5.6%	21.4%	2.9%	5.7%	15.4%
Friesland	North Friesland	43.4%	5.6%	30.3%	0.7%	6.8%	17.9%
Friesland	South West Friesland	47.1%	10.3%	29.8%	1.2%	5.9%	17.9%
Friesland	South East Friesland	37.5%	4.9%	26.0%	1.8%	4.9%	17.7%
Drenthe	North Drenthe	32.3%	4.1%	22.5%	0.9%	4.9%	14.1%
Drenthe	South East Drenthe	39.3%	13.1%	20.7%	1.1%	4.4%	11.1%
Drenthe	South West Drenthe	42.4%	4.5%	31.9%	1.2%	4.8%	16.8%
Overijssel	North Overijssel	58.7%	9.1%	40.7%	1.9%	6.9%	31.3%
Overijssel	South West Overijssel	47.3%	24.1%	13.8%	5.5%	3.9%	13.2%
Overijssel	Twente	55.6%	26.3%	19.9%	3.5%	5.8%	17.3%
Gelderland	Veluwe	57.2%	9.3%	37.3%	3.3%	7.3%	29.5%
Gelderland	Achterhoek	52.2%	27.4%	18.8%	2.4%	3.5%	12.2%
Gelderland	Arnhem/Nijmegen	47.6%	31.3%	8.4%	3.6%	4.3%	9.7%
Gelderland	South West Gelderland	54.0%	18.1%	27.5%	4.4%	4.0%	18.8%
Utrecht	Utrecht	45.3%	15.0%	19.2%	5.5%	5.6%	17.8%
Flevoland	Flevoland	46.3%	11.7%	19.4%	6.1%	9.2%	19.8%
North Holland	Kop van North Holland	37.8%	23.6%	8.4%	1.3%	4.4%	8.9%
North Holland	Alkmaar agglomeration	34.9%	17.9%	8.3%	3.2%	5.4%	10.1%
North Holland	IJmond	37.4%	23.3%	7.0%	3.1%	4.0%	9.7%
North Holland	Haarlem agglomeration	31.9%	13.8%	8.1%	5.1%	4.9%	7.6%
North Holland	Zaanstreek	32.6%	13.0%	5.8%	7.5%	6.3%	10.0%
North Holland	Greater Amsterdam	37.7%	13.4%	7.3%	8.5%	8.4%	11.1%
North Holland	Het Gooi & Vechtstreek	36.7%	11.6%	16.0%	3.5%	5.6%	12.2%
South Holland	Leiden & Bollenstreek	47.7%	21.6%	18.3%	2.9%	4.9%	14.7%
South Holland	Greater The Hague	47.4%	15.9%	10.9%	9.4%	11.2%	14.8%
South Holland	Delft & Westland	46.7%	21.7%	18.6%	2.3%	4.1%	14.0%
South Holland	East South Holland	52.0%	16.4%	24.3%	6.1%	5.2%	23.5%
South Holland	Greater Rijnmond	46.6%	11.7%	17.6%	9.1%	8.3%	17.1%
South Holland	South East South Holland	50.7%	6.4%	30.7%	7.5%	6.1%	27.4%
Zeeland	Zeelandic Flanders	58.5%	37.6%	14.7%	1.5%	4.8%	14.8%
Zeeland	Rest of Zeeland	51.6%	9.8%	34.4%	1.8%	5.6%	24.7%
North Brabant	West North Brabant	57.5%	43.4%	5.4%	5.8%	2.9%	9.5%
North Brabant	Mid North Brabant	60.4%	42.9%	10.0%	4.4%	3.2%	13.8%
North Brabant	North East North Brabant	61.0%	50.0%	3.8%	4.5%	2.7%	10.4%
North Brabant	South East North Brabant	60.3%	49.2%	3.0%	4.2%	3.8%	9.5%
Limburg	North Limburg	69.4%	61.4%	1.7%	4.4%	1.9%	11.2%
Limburg	Mid Limburg	70.3%	62.8%	1.6%	3.7%	2.2%	11.4%
Limburg	South Limburg	69.7%	61.5%	2.8%	2.6%	2.7%	12.6%

== Law ==
=== Fundamental rights ===
==== Constitutional stipulations ====
The following articles of the Constitution of the Netherlands are most important to the regulation of religion.

- Article 1 stipulates that "All persons in the Netherlands shall be treated equally in equal circumstances. Discrimination on the grounds of religion, belief, political opinion, race or sex or on any other grounds whatsoever shall not be permitted."
- Article 6 stipulates that "Everyone shall have the right to profess freely his religion or belief, either individually or in community with others, without prejudice to his responsibility under the law." However, outside of places of worship, this right can be limited in the interest of public health, traffic and public order.
- Article 23 stipulates that "education provided by public authorities shall be regulated by Act of Parliament, paying due respect to everyone's religion or belief" (§3), that "the freedom of private schools to choose their teaching aids and to appoint teachers [shall be respected]" (§6), and that "private primary schools that satisfy the conditions laid down by Act of Parliament shall be financed from public funds according to the same standards as public-authority schools. The conditions under which private secondary education and pre-university education shall receive contributions from public funds shall be laid down by Act of Parliament." (§7).

==== Problems and debates ====
The exact necessity, scope and consequences of the constitutionally defined freedom of religion are subject to discussion. Critics argue it is superfluous to recognise 'freedom of religion' (primarily described in Article 6) as a separate fundamental right, because the freedom of conscience, thought, and expression (Article 7), the freedom of association (Article 8), and the freedom of assembly and demonstration (Article 9) are supposedly sufficient to guarantee all fundamental rights of religious people. Moreover, freedom of religion could be, or is allegedly being, used or abused to violate the rights of others, for example children's rights in the case of circumcision (potentially in contravention to the right to bodily integrity as recognised in Article 11) and religious 'indoctrination' of schoolchildren via religious education (further elaborated in Article 23 on the freedom of education, potentially in contravention to the freedom of conscience/thought/expression of children as recognised in Article 7), or animal rights by unstunned ritual slaughter (stunning is required for all slaughterhouses, except Jewish and Islamic ones, according to the 2018 Unstunned Slaughter According to Religious Rituals Covenant, potentially in contravention to the right to equal treatment as recognised in Article 1). Furthermore, it is argued that there is no need for an explicit, separate mention of 'religious belief' in Article 1 of the Constitution, considering that religious opinions should not receive special protection above other opinions of a non-religious kind.

=== Human rights ===
- On 1 November 1984, abortion in the Netherlands was legalised under certain conditions through the Abortion of Pregnancy Act (Dutch: Wet afbreking zwangerschap), but remained part of criminal law. Under the original law, anyone seeking to have an abortion was legally required to wait five days (a "reflection period", Dutch: bedenktijd) before having it performed. Thus, a compromise was established between the (legal) protection of unborn human life – primarily demanded by conservative Christian groups – on the one hand, and the right of a woman to receive help in the event of an unwanted pregnancy – mainly asserted by the women's movement – on the other. Discussions continued on the precise balance between these two main interests. Especially Christian parties argued that the five-day waiting period was essential for making an informed decision, and a possible change of mind before having the abortion performed, as this could 'save the unborn child's life' and 'prevent the would-be mother's regret'. Secular parties and women's rights organisations maintained that the reflection period put people with an unwanted pregnancy under undue stress, and restricted their right to bodily autonomy. Though in a parliamentary minority, Christian parties managed to block any amendment to the law for decades until June 2022, when a Senate majority agreed to Parliament's March 2022 proposal to remove the five-day waiting requirement.
- In 1994, the "single fact" clause (Dutch: "enkele feit"-constructie) was included in the General Equal Treatment Act (Dutch: Algemene wet gelijke behandeling). Amongst other things, the law stipulated that a religious school could not fire a teacher for "the single fact" that they had a homosexual orientation. Since 1994, the ambiguity of this formulation had been the subject of discussion, as some argued that it still permitted firing an employee for their sexual orientation in combination with another "fact", while others argued it did not. Eventually, a parliamentary majority voted in favour of abolishing the formulation; the government did so per 1 July 2015. According to minister Ronald Plasterk, in its 20-year existence, it had occurred "zero times that someone was fired by invoking this formulation"; nevertheless, it was important to make clear that discrimination, in combination with something else or not, could never be a reason for terminating someone's contract.
- On 1 April 2001, the Netherlands became the first country in the world to legalise same-sex marriage. The three Christian parties opposed the 2000 bill, but were outvoted by all secular parties in Parliament (109 to 33) and the Senate (49 to 26).
- On 7 September 2005, the district court of The Hague ruled that the Reformed Political Party (SGP) could no longer receive subsidies from the government, because women were not allowed to hold positions in the party. This was found to be a violation of the 1981 Convention on the Elimination of All Forms of Discrimination Against Women (CEDAW), by which the Netherlands had committed themselves to fighting gender-based discrimination. It also was a violation of the first article of the Dutch constitution, the principle of non-discrimination. The Dutch Council of State overturned the decision nevertheless, maintaining that a party's political philosophy takes precedence, and that women have the opportunity to join other political parties where they can obtain a leadership role. Nevertheless, in two cassation cases brought by the State and the SGP, the Supreme Court confirmed the judgement of the district court on 9 April 2010. The complaint lodged by the SGP against the ruling of the Supreme Court with the European Court of Human Rights was declared inadmissible in 2012. The Court considered further action against the SGP desirable, but could not rule on this, because this was not at issue in this case.

=== Finances ===
In general, religious organisations (called kerkgenootschappen, literally 'church associations') and places of worship (called gebedshuizen, literally 'houses of prayer', or kerkgebouwen, literally 'church buildings') do not hold a special position in the Dutch tax system.

- As legal entities, religious organizations are treated the same way as sports clubs and sporting events organizers, algemeen nut beogende instellingen (anbi's), and cultural institutes: they are subjected to the so-called 'limited tax duty', which means they only need to pay corporate taxes in certain cases:
  - 'when it participates in trade with an organization of capital and labor, and makes a profit, or strives to make a profit (it runs an enterprise), and no exemption applies, or'
  - 'when it engages in an activity in which it competes with entrepreneurs, and no exemption applies, or'
  - 'when the inspector invites it to file its taxes'.
- Churches need to pay value-added tax (VAT; Dutch: btw).
- Church buildings need to pay property taxes (Dutch: onroerendezaakbelasting, ozb), unless at least 70% of the property (the church building) is destined 'for public religious services or reflection meetings of a philosophical nature'; gatherings such as catechesis and Bible study groups are grouped under the latter denominator. Residential parts such as a clergy house do not fall under the exemption.

== Educational institutes ==
- Freedom of education
- School struggle (Netherlands)
- Special school (Netherlands)

== See also ==
- Irreligion in the Netherlands
- Religion by country
- Ietsism

== Bibliography ==
- de Vries, Jelle (2002). The Babi Question You Mentioned--: The Origins of the Baháʼí Community of the Netherlands, 1844-1962. Peeters Publishers. ISBN 978-90-429-1109-3.
- Hoekstra, E.G.; Ypenburg, M.H. (2000). Wegwijs in religieus en levensbeschouwelijk Nederland. Kampen: Uitgeverij Kok. ISBN 978-90-435-0028-9.
