= Miracle of Love (disambiguation) =

Miracle of Love is a new religious movement based in Denver, Colorado.

Miracle of Love may also refer to:

- "Miracle of Love" (song), a 1956 song by Eileen Rodgers
- "The Miracle of Love", a 1986 song recorded by British pop music duo The Eurythmics
- "Miracle of Love", a 1987 song by Roger Daltrey on the solo album Can't Wait to See the Movie
- The Miracle of Love (film), a 1919 American silent drama film
- Miracles of Love, a 1925 Philippine film starring Elizabeth Cooper
