= Irreligion in the Netherlands =

Religion in the Netherlands (CBS Statistics Netherlands)
1. Unaffiliated (Atheist & Irreligious) 58 (54.2%)
2. Catholicism 16 (15.0%)
3. Protestantism 12 (11.2%)
4. Eastern Orthodox 2 (1.87%)
5. Other Christian 5 (4.67%)
6. Islam 6 (5.61%)
7. Buddhism 1 (0.93%)
8. Other religions 7 (6.54%)

Irreligion in the Netherlands pertains to atheism, agnosticism, and other forms of irreligion in the Netherlands. The majority of the population has stated that they were irreligious since 2015. There remains a historical and prominent Christian minority, as well as a large secular lapsed Christian minority. Also, about a million, mostly Sunni Muslims make up about a 5% Islamic minority, making Islam the second largest religion in the Netherlands – a new development through immigration, mostly since ca. 1970. Overall, since 2021 around 55% of the population of Netherlands has been non-religious.

Until World War II, the Netherlands had a small but influential Jewish minority for centuries. The Holocaust all but eradicated them, while the Jewish influences in Dutch history and culture remain.

== History ==
17th century philosopher Baruch Spinoza was an early critic of religious authority in the country. Secularization, and the decline in religiosity, started around 1880 and first became noticeable after 1960 in the Protestant rural areas of Friesland and Groningen. It later spread to Amsterdam, Rotterdam and the other large cities in the west. In the 1970s, the Catholic southern areas started to show religious declines.

After the Second World War, the major religions began to decline, while the previously insignificant religion of Islam began to increase in numbers. During the 1960s and 1970s, pillarization began to weaken and the population became less religious. In 1971, 39% of the Dutch population were members of the Roman Catholic Church; by 2014, their share of the population had dropped to about 23.3%. The proportion of adherents of Protestantism declined in the same period from 31% to 15.5%. A significant percentage of the population adheres to other Protestant churches and the Old Catholic Church.

With only 49.9% of the Dutch adhering to a religion as of 2015, the Netherlands is one of the least religious countries of Europe, after the Czech Republic and Estonia. From the 1960s through 1980s, religion lost a substantial amount of influence in Dutch politics, and as a result, Dutch policies on abortion, prostitution, same-sex marriage and euthanasia became very liberal in the following decades.

The Dutch Bible Belt is a stretch of land where only 2.5% of the Dutch population lives, the only place in the Netherlands where there are a great number of conservative, orthodox Protestants in the country. It starts from the province of Zeeland in the southwest to parts of Overijssel in the northeast. The people who live here are extremely conservative, not allowed in front of television, and strictly follow only what the Bible says.

=== Humanism ===
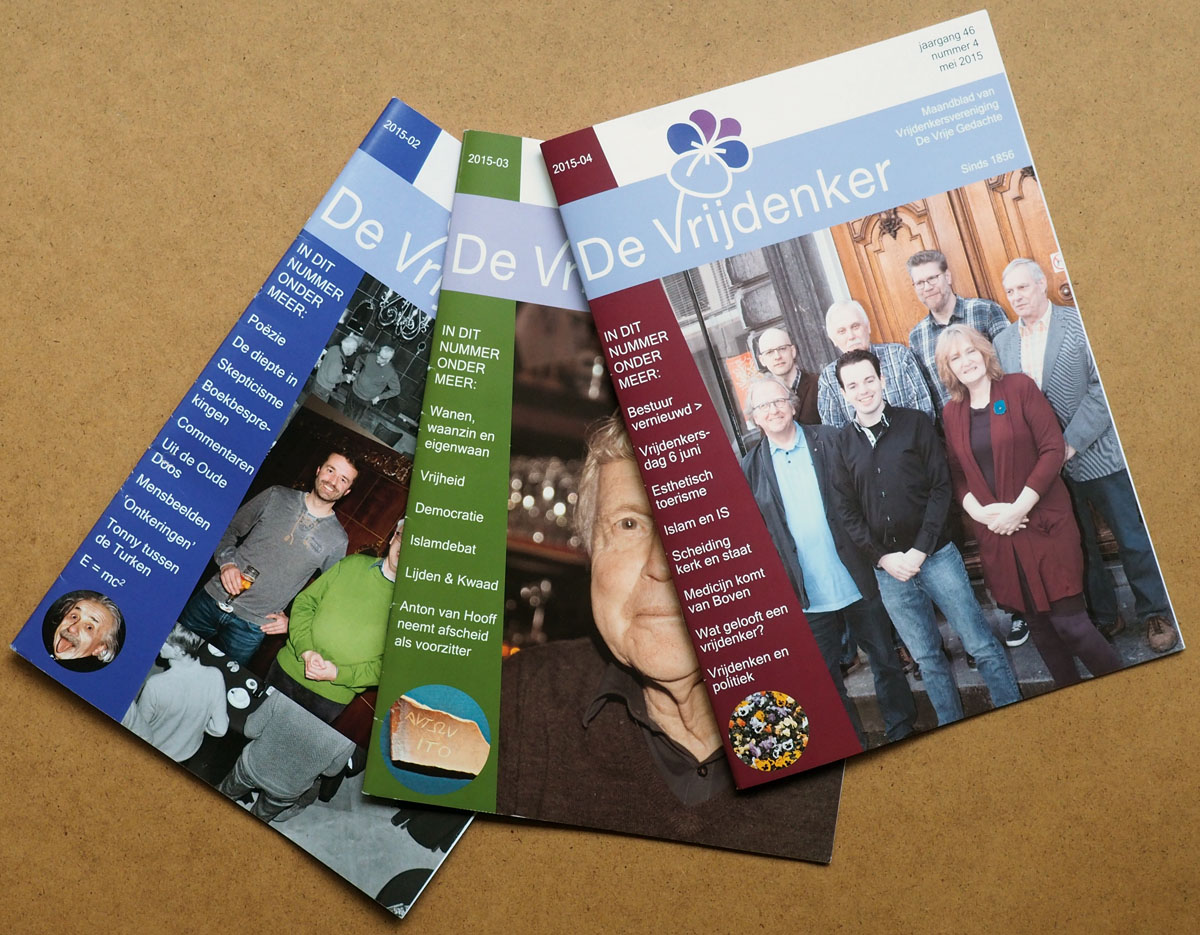
The Dutch monthly magazine De Vrijdenker (The Freethinker).

Research in 2003 shows that about 1.27 million people in the Netherlands express explicitly an affinity with secular humanism, which is about 9.4% of the total population. Erasmus and Coornhert are the representatives of Christian humanism in the Netherlands in the 16th century. Erasmus translated many classical texts so that they were accessible to a wide audience. In this period, there was still no non-or anti-religion movement. However, there was a sense of free will, own strength and reason. Dirck Coornhert in the Netherlands was one of the first who advocated religious tolerance.

In the 17th century, Baruch Spinoza and Hugo Grotius advanced humanist ideas. The jurist Hugo Grotius focused on international law, relating to war and peace. Internationally, he is regarded as the founder of modern human rights. During the Age of Enlightenment, humanist ideas expanded in the Netherlands. The modern organized humanist movement began in the Netherlands in the mid-nineteenth century with the establishment of freethinkers association De Dageraad (The Dawn), influenced by writers like Multatuli, and later Anton Constandse.

With the establishment of the humanistic associations Humanitas in 1945 and the Humanistisch Verbond in 1946, Dutch humanists organized themselves after the Second World War to fight the still highly compartmentalized pillarized society which was dominated by separate Christians movements in the Netherlands. When the Universal Declaration of Human Rights was adopted by the United Nations in 1948, the Dutch Humanist movements became involved with the establishment of the International Humanist and Ethical Union in 1952 (and since 1990 also the European Humanist Federation).

== Demographics ==
In December 2014, for the first time there were more atheists (25%) than theists (17%) in the Netherlands, with majority of the population being agnostic (31%) or spiritual but not religious (27%). In 2016, irreligious people rose to 50% of the population in the Netherlands, and this number rose to a majority of 51% in 2018.

A 2015 survey showed that 63% of Dutch people thought that religion does more harm than good. Not all respondents agreed with the statement that religion does more harm to the same degree. Most respondents (26%) agreed "a little". 19% of respondents "agreed" with the statement and another 18% "agreed completely". Atheists (25% of Dutch people) see the most harm in religion. Of this group, 88% agreed that religion does more harm than good. The study showed that the more faithful someone is, the less likely that person is to believe religion does more harm than good. Of the faithful, 21% believe that religion has a more damaging than beneficial effect. A quarter of the population thinks that morality is threatened if no one believes in God, down from 40% in 2006. The number of people reporting that they never pray rose from 36% in 2006 to 53% in 2016.

According to the reports from the Dutch Sociaal en Cultureel Planbureau, the percentage of Dutch people that believe in God is decreasing over time. This is happening due to how in previous years many Dutch knew the idea of God and chose to not follow a religion. Now as they continue to have children, the younger children are having no exposure to religion at all, indicating they are becoming agnostic. Based on the research SCP has done, this leads to an increase in the number of mental burnouts as atheists and agnostics have to give meaning to their own lives. It does not mean they are unhappy, but they must create a meaning in their personal lives, while others prefer to not think about it.

Pew Research Centre in 2018 discovered that 53% of Dutch in the Netherlands selected "Do not believe in God".

== See also ==
- Catholic Church in the Netherlands
- Demography of the Netherlands
- List of Dutch atheists
- Religion in the Netherlands
