= Brotherhood of Baptist Churches =

The Brotherhood of Baptist Churches (Dutch: Broederschap van Baptistengemeenten in Nederland) is a Baptist fellowship that includes most Baptists not belonging to the Union of Baptist Churches in the Netherlands.

The Brotherhood was formed in 1981 under the leadership of Henk G. Koekkoek. In 1995 the Brotherhood had about 2500 members in 26 churches.

In 2002, the Brotherhood joined with the Christian And Missionary Alliance Churches to form the ABC ('Alliance of Baptists and CAMA Congregations'). ABC merged with The Union of Baptist Congregation in 2023.

== See also ==
- Union of Baptist Churches in the Netherlands
