= Union of Baptist Churches in the Netherlands =

Christian denomination in the Netherlands

- Classification: Evangelical Christianity
- Theology: Baptist
- Associations: Baptist World Alliance
- Headquarters: Amsterdam, Netherlands
- Origin: 1881
- Congregations: 80
- Members: 9,184
- Official website: unie-abc.nl

The Union of Baptist Churches in the Netherlands (Dutch: Unie van Baptistengemeenten in Nederland) is a Baptist Christian denomination in the Netherlands. It is affiliated with the Baptist World Alliance. The headquarters is in Amsterdam.

== History ==
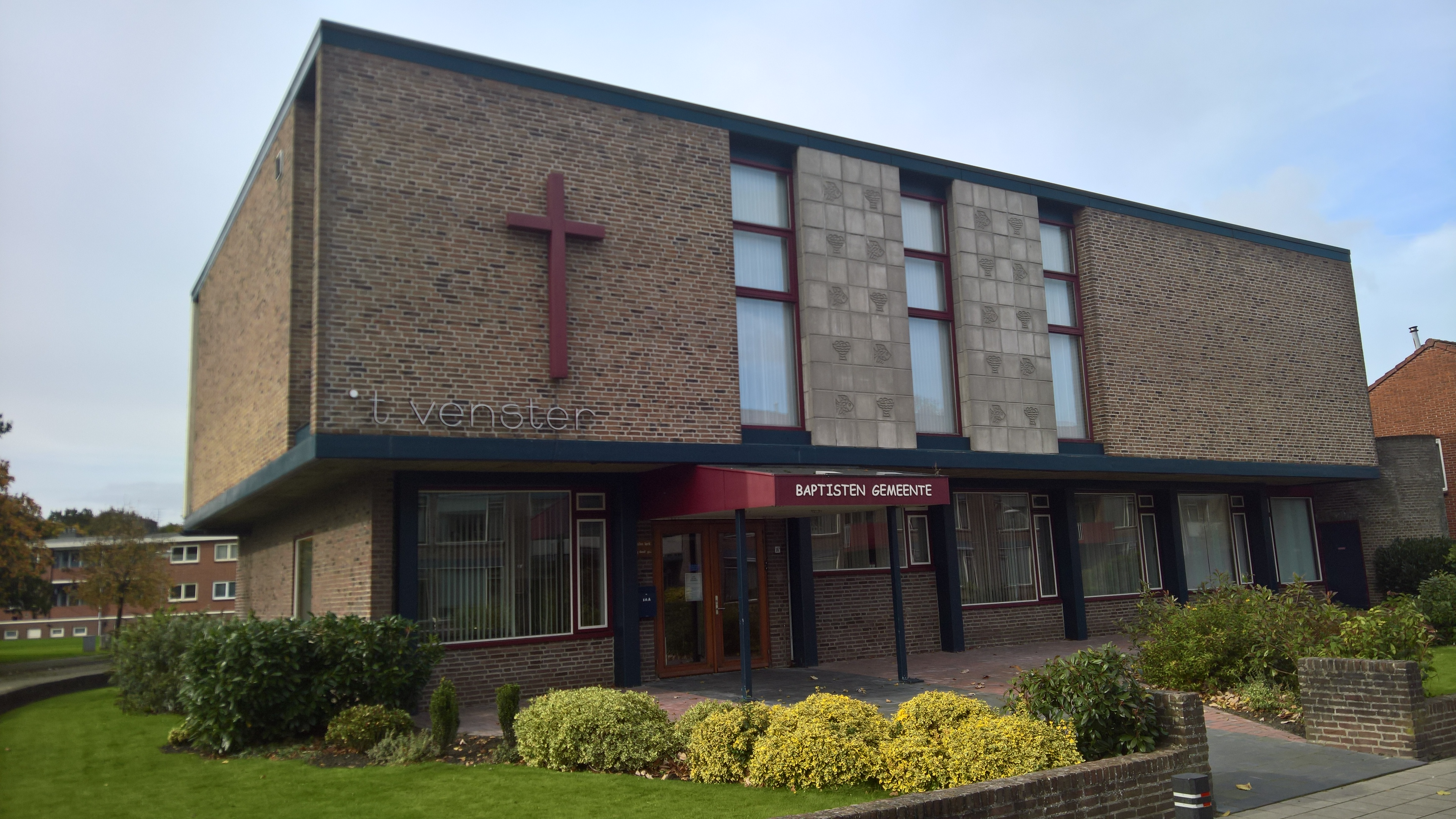
Baptist Church of Winschoten.

The Union of Baptist Churches in the Netherlands has its origins in the founding of the first Baptist church in Amsterdam, by the English pastor John Smyth in 1609, thus marking the beginning of the Baptist movement. However, it was a mission of the Danish Julius Köbner in 1845 that allowed the establishment of several churches in the country. It was officially founded by seven congregations in 1881. According to a census published by the association in 2023, it claimed 80 churches and 9,184 members.

== See also ==
- Born again
- Baptist beliefs
- Believers' Church
- Brotherhood of Baptist Churches
