= Miracle of Love =

American new religious movement (1987-)

- Formation: 1987
- Founder: David Swanson; Carole Seidman ("Kalindi") "The Lady"
- Type: New religious movement
- Headquarters: Denver, Colorado, U.S.
- Leaders (until 2010): Kalindi La Gourasana; The Lady

The Miracle of Love is a new religious movement based in Denver, Colorado. Miracle of Love now goes by the name Center of The Golden One. Until 2010, it was headed by two leaders: Kalindi La Gourasana and The Lady. The group's stated goal is to "break people free from the cycle of birth and death and bring them home to God in this lifetime." The central guidance on how to do this derives from the teachings of the Gourasana.

== History ==
The Miracle of Love was started in 1987 by David Swanson, his wife Carole Seidman (who took the name Kalindi), The Lady, and several other persons. This is when the being Gourasana is believed to have entered David Swanson's body as "an Incarnation of God manifesting on Earth". After David Swanson's death in 1995, Gourasana is believed to have begun speaking through Kalindi. Kalindi died on April 18, 2010

A trademark request for "Gourasana Meditation Practice" was filed in 1996 by the Church of Exodus in San Diego, California.

The 2009 press release says that the seminar was first offered in San Diego, California, in 1991, and that over 5,000 people had participated since then at locations in the U.S., Europe, South America, and Australia.

== Philosophy ==
The Miracle of Love teaches that this material plane of existence is one of duality, with inevitable pain, suffering, and death, to which we are locked by our attachments, and these attachments cause us to be reborn in a cycle of reincarnation.

The Miracle of Love teaches that people can break free of this cycle and achieve full union with God in this lifetime by surrendering the ego and separate will to God, following the guidance of the leaders, giving in service, and using the special assistance provided by Lord Gourasana in the Gourasana Meditation Practice to break material and conceptual attachments.

It has been described by the Pacific Sun newspaper as having aspects of a large group awareness training (LGAT) group.

== Controversy ==
In 2011, a documentary by crime journalist Alberto Stegeman suggested, through an undercover operation, that the Seminars of Love taking place in Germany and the Netherlands, organized by Miracle of Love, were of a strongly cultish character, whereby participants are required to sign non-disclosure agreements, are deprived of outside social contacts and sleep, and instigated to behave in sexually explicit manners by undressing, yelling obscenities, and touching themselves or others in manners normally regarded as inappropriate.

There have been testimonies and blogs of former members and second-hand accounts of Miracle of Love with similar negative views, accusing Miracle of Love of being a cult.
