= Jacob Klapwijk =

Dutch philosopher and professor (1933–2021)

Jacob Klapwijk (24 October 1933 – 19 March 2021) was a Dutch philosopher, and Emeritus Professor of Modern and Systematic Philosophy at the Vrije Universiteit, Amsterdam, known for his work on Ernst Troeltsch and historicism, Reformational thinking, the transformational task of Christian philosophy, and the theory of emergent evolution.

== Biography ==
Born in Dronrijp, Klapwijk started to study Philosophy and Theology in 1952 at the Vrije Universiteit (VU University), where he received his MA in 1961. For many years he was research assistant to one of the founding fathers of reformational philosophy, D. H. Th. Vollenhoven. In 1970 he received his PhD in Philosophy with a thesis entitled "Between Historicism and Relativism", under supervision of Vollenhoven's colleague S. U. Zuidema.

After his graduation in the early 1960s Klapwijk became lector in Logic at the Vrije Universiteit. In 1974 he was appointed Professor of History of Modern Philosophy, and later was Professor of Systematic Philosophy. Among his students were John Kok and René Woudenberg. He retired in 1994.

== Work ==
Klapwijk's research interest concerns the "relationship between reason and religion, and the delicate concept of Christian philosophy". He focused on "the great variety of models of Christian thinking and in particular on the fundamental contrast between the medieval-scholastic and Augustinian-reformed tradition."

=== Ernst Troeltsch, historicism and the intimations of radical historicity ===
Initially Klapwijk’s writings chiefly dealt with various theories of history and society. His doctoral dissertation was written on Ernst Troeltsch (1865-1923), the German theologian and later philosopher of history in Hegel’s Chair in Berlin, who was widely celebrated for his defense of radical historicism and who gave us the sociological distinction between Church, Sect and Mysticism. The Dutch title for Klapwijk’s thesis was Tussen historisme en relativisme: Een studie over de dynamiek van het historisme en de wijsgerige ontwikkelingsgang van Ernst Troeltsch (1970, English 2013). The dissertation analyzes Troeltsch’s philosophy of "radical historicity" by distinguishing six phases in its development, a development that started with a broad Hegelian perspective of universal history and ended in an extreme "monadological individualism" rooted in mysticism. In later years Klapwijk confronts this radicalized historicism with its relativistic and self-contradictory consequences even in the fields of ethics and theology. He then pretends that we have to accept the radical historicity of human beings including pluralism of norms and values without ignoring the undeniable intimations of ultimate, universal core principles that rule our daily life. This universality can only be based on the fundamental difference between anamnetic and academic history.

In 1974 Klapwijk received a Chair at VU University in the History of Modern Philosophy, while in the eighties a Chair in Systematic Philosophy was added. His inaugural lecture was published as Dialektiek der verlichting: Een verkenning in het neomarxisme van de Frankfurter Schule (1976, English 2010). In this book Klapwijk gives credit to the Frankfurt School of Critical Theory by discussing the critical views that Marcuse, Horkheimer, Adorno and the early Habermas developed with respect to contemporary history and the modern welfare of society. He concludes that, indeed, we need a critical reconstructing of the legacy of the Enlightenment in terms of freedom, rationality and human dignity, but that the Critical Theory is not critical enough. At bottom it can be interpreted as an insufficiently clarified expression of faith.

=== Reformational philosophy clarifies its own inner history, and its relation to modern society ===
A key task that Klapwijk took upon himself right from the start was that of analyzing the distinctive position of so-called Reformational philosophy. He focussed on Vollenhoven's early vision of an integral Scriptural philosophy that is not accommodated to ancient Greek paganism or modern secular humanism, undiluted by what Vollenhoven and his colleague at the VU, Herman Dooyeweerd, had called "synthesis philosophy", i.e. a mix of biblical motifs with sophisticated conceptions of a non-Christian origin. For Vollenhoven, this synthesis quality compromised the Middle Ages and even the entirety of Patristic philosophical theology, contrary to Alfred North Whitehead's appraisal of the same era. But Klapwijk emphasized how in later years Vollenhoven acknowledged that an antithetical attitude, so characteristic for Reformational thinkers, does not exclude affinities and structural similarities between secular theories and Christian philosophy. Here already, Klapwijk raised the crucial question whether religious antithesis should not go hand in hand with philosophical openness, "an openness to bring all human thought into captivity to the obedience of Christ."

Klapwijk also analyzed and evaluated differences between the university's two leading lights, Abraham Kuyper and Herman Bavinck, both now long deceased but both with partisan followers who could live less with the leaders' differences than could those leaders themselves. One of Klapwijk's first attempts to articulate this critical stance for his philosophical community occurred in a widely-read volume edited by Hendrik Hart, Johan van der Hoeven, and Nicholas Wolterstorff, reviewed in Theology Today by Eugene Osterhaven: "An excellent chapter on 'Rationality in the Dutch Neo-Calvinist Tradition' by Jacob Klapwijk ... treats Abraham Kuyper's doctrines of common grace, and the antithesis, and his failure to harmonize the two, especially when he dealt with human reason. Kuyper's attempts to give the antithesis organizational form is shown to "lead to a dangerous identification of the Christian (or, if you will, Reformed) cause with God's cause." Although Kuyper intended Christian organizations to be a means for Christianizing society, 'the danger was that they were considered not as deficient instruments but as ends in the struggle for the Kingdom of God'."

As mentioned by Osterhaven, one major difference in ideas between Bavinck and Kuyper is formulated in terms inherent to the Reformed tradition. It's the contrast between the doctrine of "religious antithesis" (not only the human soul but all of life in culture and society is to be redeemed) and its counterpart, the doctrine of "common grace" (cultural goods are tokens of God’s grace equally for Christians and non-Christians). How to integrate both perspectives? Bavinck emphasized common grace, while Kuyper, in many of his works, emphasized (sometimes severely) the antithetical attitude, also in terms of separate Christian organizations in public life. A comparison of the two positions, which came to designate two interwoven and contentious traditions in the Christian Reformed Churches in the Netherlands and the Christian movements that flowed from its membership, is presented in one of the three chapters that Jacob Klapwijk contributed to a very important self-critical work of Reformational philosophy, entitled Bringing into Captivity Every Thought (1991). He was one of the three editors of the volume and among nearly a dozen contributors.

=== Clarifying his philosophical movement's task as transformational in the wider world ===
The dispute about synthesis and antithesis has incisive consequences for the Christian’s position in culture and society but touches in particular the Christian calling in philosophy. Klapwijk wanted to think of Reformational philosophy not only, not even primarily as "Calvinist" in Vollenhoven's term, not only as "reformational-ecumenical" (in Herman Dooyeweerd's terms), but as a transformational philosophy. He took as an example the Church fathers’ notion of spoliatio Aegyptiorum, the robbery of the Egyptians (see Ex. 12:36). God ordered the Israelites in the great exodus to rob their antagonists of their silver and golden treasures. Yet, it was not for the sake of synthesis and syncretism (‘the golden calf’): the metals were purified and re-used for the service of God in the sanctuary of the desert. This is for Klapwijk a paradigm of the transforming power of a religious belief, also in philosophical discussions. Christian philosophy should overcome the synthesis/antithesis dilemma. It is athletic enough to keep pace with the broader philosophical world, putting the theories of the day to a critical test and using what is valuable in such a way that it can become subservient to a Christian perspective on reality in the realms of theoretical thought.

=== Transformational philosophy and living nature ===
In recent years Klapwijk has applied his view of Christian philosophy in terms of transformation to the field of living nature and evolutionary theory. He was unhappy with the strictly antithetical attitude of Creationism towards the current naturalistic theories of evolution. But he likewise rejected the uncritical acceptance of these views in so-called Theistic evolution, as if God created the world in all its diversity through evolution. It's just the other way around; if the world is involved in an evolutionary process, it is so on the basis of God's creation word in the beginning. Even the theory of Intelligent Design is in his opinion too much based on a compromise, a synthesis of mechanistic naturalism and supernatural interventions. How do we overcome the present-day divide between religious and so-called secular views of the origin of life? In his book Purpose in the Living World? Creation and Emergent Evolution (2008) Klapwijk offers a philosophical analysis of the relation of evolutionary biology to religion, and addresses the question of whether the evolution of life is exclusively a matter of chance and blind fortune or is better understood as including the notion of purpose. He proposes to bridge the gap via the idea of "emergent evolution."

Klapwijk's theory of emergent evolution (TEE) indicates how at crucial moments in earthly history, when basic conditions of solidity and complexity were suitable, physical things reorganized themselves in such a way that new forms of existence were disclosed. This happened in particular when in the physical world micro-organisms, plants, animals and humans came into being. In these new entities biotic, vegetative, sensitive and mental or moral modes of being emerged, step by step. These higher levels of being and behavior still have a physical or molecular basis; all living organisms obey physical laws, that is the partial truth of scientific naturalism. But at critical turning points in the evolutionary process things on earth came in the grip of above-physical principles. Without losing their material birth certificate they succeeded in functioning in new ways, as living, growing, feeling and sometimes even as intelligent beings. The modal levels that successively emerged in these new domains of organisms represent regulation systems all of their own. In short, it is the modal hierarchy of physical laws, biotic rules, vegetative patterns, sensitive standards, mental and moral principles that in due time has given rise to phenomena of emergent or "transcendental novelty" (G. Ledyard Stebbins). Klapwijk’s TEE can be described as a non-reductive evolutionary theory attuned to the different modal spheres that characterize our earthly existence. It recognizes the curious discontinuities that have arisen in nature in the course of time not as the origin of completely new types of organisms, as creationists suggest, but as the genesis of new modal fields that come to the fore where things or organisms are equipped with higher level characteristics and observe rules of their own without ignoring their bond with their material substratum. To put it differently, the emergent levels of being and behavior that can be distinguished in living beings are conditioned by but not simply identifiable as parts of the complexification process that characterizes the physical world. This "levelism" (John Searle) has important implications for scientific research. With respect to epigenetic phenomena, master genes, so-called jumping genes (transposable elements in the cell) and other issues in the contemporary evolution debate, it encourages interdisciplinary research. It can offer a more promising framework for theoretical analysis than a one-sided naturalistic or materialistic approach.

The hierarchical ordering of the living world suggests an underlying plan and purpose. Here the language of science and even of philosophy finds its limits. In Klapwijk’s opinion we need a different, more comprehensive language. In the language of religion one could say that the creation word of God in the beginning, spelled out in the Genesis story of the seven creation days, is the driving force behind the dynamic progress, the modal hierarchy, and the various levels of evolutionary development. The Big Bang, the early inceptions of cosmic time and space, the primeval expressions of unicellular life, the rise of the multicellular systems of plants and animals and, last but not least, the intimacies of human consciousness are difficult to unite in a great chain of being, for scientists to comprehend in an ontology, an overall view of reality. But in the eyes of faith all temporal phenomena and all emergent innovations can be considered to be temporary disclosures of divine creation. According to Klapwijk it is the basic motive of divine creation that propels the world from its very beginning towards its final completion in the Kingdom of God.

== Publications ==
- Klapwijk, Jacob (1970). Tussen historisme en relativisme: Een studie over de dynamiek van het historisme en de wijsgerige ontwikkelingsgang van Ernst Troeltsch diss. VU University, Amsterdam. Assen: Van Gorcum. (English 2013).
- Klapwijk, Jacob; Hendrik Hart; and Kor A. Bril (editors, 1973). The Idea of a Christian Philosophy: Essays in Honour of D H Th Vollenhoven (Toronto: Wedge).
- Klapwijk, Jacob (1973). "Calvin and Neo-Calvinism on Non-Christian Philosophy," Philosophia Reformata 38, pp. 43–61.
- Klapwijk, Jacob (1976) Dialektiek der verlichting: Een verkenning in het neomarxisme van de Frankfurter Schule, openbare les VU, Assen/Amsterdam: Van Gorcum. [English 2010].
- Klapwijk, Jacob (1980). "The Struggle for a Christian Philosophy: Another Look at Dooyeweerd " in: The Reformed Journal 30, pp. 12–15, 20–24.
- Klapwijk, Jacob (1983). "Rationality in the Dutch Calvinist Tradition," Rationality in the Calvinian Tradition (eds Hart, Van der Hoeven, Wolterstorff, Lanham, MD, USA: University Press of America), pp. 93–111.
- Klapwijk, Jacob (1986). "Antithesis, Synthesis, and the Idea of Transformational Philosophy," Philosophia Reformata 51, pp. 138–152.
- Klapwijk, Jacob (1987). Kijken naar kopstukken (Amsterdam: Buijten en Schipperheijn).
- Klapwijk, Jacob (1987). "Reformational Philosophy on the Boundary between Past and Future," Philosophia Reformata 52, pp 101–134.
- Klapwijk, Jacob; Sander Griffioen; and Gerben Groenewoud (editors, 1991). Bringing into Captivity Every Thought: Capita Selecta in the History of Christian Evaluations of non-Christian Philosophy (Lanham, MD, USA: University Press of America).
- Klapwijk, Jacob (1991). "Antithesis and Common Grace." Klapwijk, Griffioen, Groenewoud (eds.). Bringing into Captivity Every Thought: Capita Selecta in the History of Christian Philosophy (Lanham, MD, USA: University Press of America), pp. 169–190.
- Klapwijk, Jacob (1991). "Epilogue: the idea of transformational philosophy." Klapwijk, Griffioen, Groenewoud (eds.). Bringing into Captivity Every Thought: Capita Selecta in the History of Christian Philosophy (Lanham, MD, USA: University Press of America), pp. 241–266.
- Klapwijk, Jacob (1994). "Pluralism of Norms and Values: On the Claim and Reception of the Universal," Philosophia Reformata 59 (2), pp. 158–192.
- Klapwijk, Jacob (2008). Purpose in the Living World? Creation and Emergent Evolution. (Cambridge: Cambridge University Press).
- Klapwijk, Jacob (2009). Heeft de evolutie een doel? Over schepping en emergente evolutie, Kampen: Kok. 2009 [English 2008].
- Klapwijk, Jacob (2009). "Commemoration: On the First and Second History ", in Philosophia Reformata 74, pp. 48–70.
- Klapwijk, Jacob (2010). Dialectic of Enlightenment: Critical Theory and the Messianic Light, inaugural lecture VU 1976, translated by C.L. Yallop and P.M. Yallop, Foreword by Lambert Zuidervaart. Eugene, OR: Wipf & Stock.
- Klapwijk, Jacob (2011). "Creation Belief and the Paradigm of Emergent Evolution ", in Philosophia Reformata 76, pp. 11–31.
- Klapwijk, Jacob (2012). "Nothing in Evolutionary Theory Makes Sense Except in the Light of Creation ", transl. Harry Cook, in: Philosophia Reformata 77, pp. 57–77.
- Klapwijk, Jacob (2013). "Abraham Kuyper on Science, Theology and University ", in Philosophia Reformata 78, pp. 18–46.
- Klapwijk, Jacob (2013). Between Historicism and Relativism: Dynamics of Historicism and the Philosophical Development of Ernst Troeltsch , translated by H. Donald Morton. VU University Amsterdam. online.

About Klapwijk

- Hart, Hendrik; Johan van der Hoeven; and Nicholas Wolterstorff (editors, 1983). Rationality in the Calvinian Tradition (Lanham, MD, USA: University Press of America).
- Osterhaven, M. Eugene (1984). Book review: "Rationality in the Calvinian Tradition," Theology Today, October 1984.
- Henk Hogeboom van Buggenum (2009). Book review J. Klapwijk, Heeft de evolutie een doel? in Gamma: Forum over onze rol in die evolutie 169 (3), pp. 37-40.
- Lambert Zuidervaart, Lambert (2010). “Foreword” in Klapwijk’s, Dialectic of Enlightenment: Critical Theory and the Messianic Light.
- Critical essays by Roy Clouser, John Satherley, Henk Geertsema, Russ Wolfinger, Bruce Wearne, Gerben Groenewoud, Chris Gousmett, and Harry Cook on Klapwijk’s Purpose (2008), in Philosophia Reformata 75 (1) and 76 (1). 2010-2011.
- Cook, Harry (2013). “Emergence: A Biologist’s Look at Complexity in Nature” in Perspectives on Science and Christian Faith 65, pp. 233–241.

== See also ==
- Emergence
  - Emergentism
