= Alan Cameron (legal scholar) =

New Zealand legal academic

Alan Cameron is a Senior Lecturer on the Faculty of Law of Victoria University of Wellington in Wellington, New Zealand. His academic speciality is accountancy law. Cameron is also a Juridical scholar who reflects on the nature of law in relation to the distinctives of the New Zealand legal tradition and the wider legal developments around the world. He is a critical proponent of the Juridical philosophy developed by past professor of law at the Free University in Amsterdam, the Netherlands, Dr Herman Dooyeweerd.

Dooyeweerd's overall conception is often referred to as the philosophy of the law-idea (Dutch: Wijsbegeerte der Wetsidee - "WdW," a nickname pronounced "vay de vay). Although his 5-volume major work in jurisprudence is only now in the process of being published, with the appearance of Volume I of Encyclopedia of the Science of Law , the ideas Dooyeweerd taught during his professorship in jurisprudence have been in circulation in the English-speaking world since 1953, when Dooyeweerd's first volume of A New Critique of Theoretical Thought appeared. This broader philosophical work establishes a context for both the juridical philosophy, and the various nationally-distinctive bodies of juridical scholarship.

Dooyeweerd's colleague, professor of philosophy and co-founder with Dooyeweerd of Reformational philosophy, D. H. Th. Vollenhoven, distinguishes "three senses of ‘law’: structural law, inherent in the cosmos; the imposed or proclaimed law of love, as the message of the Gospel in which Christ summarizes the teaching of Moses and the Prophets; and the positive laws, enacted from out of positions of responsibility, in which a situation is given more definite form, in accordance to the norming law of love, in the context of actual geographical and historical exigencies. In this last development, history is taken in the sense of encompassing the entire cosmos. There are successive emphases here, first to ‘God’, then to ‘Law’, then to ‘Cosmos’. With each step the meaning of all three is deepened," says Dr Anthony Tol.
