= Anthony Tol =

Dr. Anthony "Tony" Tol (11 May 1943 in Boskoop – 2 July 2014) served in the Documentation Center of the Vrije Universiteit Amsterdam, the Netherlands, as an archivist for the collection of materials assembled there for 19th Century historical developments in that country. Tol did his undergraduate studies at Calvin College, Grand Rapids, Michigan, and then received his PhD in philosophy under D. H. Th. Vollenhoven, professor of philosophy at Vrije Universiteit. Tony Tol became an active proponent of a method for study of the history of Western philosophy and its systematics, the method which Vollenhoven had empirically built-up by studying 16,000 individual philosophers over the course of theoretical thought in the West. Called by Vollenhoven the Consequent Problem-Historical Method (CPHM), the approach proved fascinating to Tol, who became one of its prime users in his own philosophical research and a theorizer of the development of the philosophical movement which had given it birth. The movement gave rise to the school of thought known as Reformational philosophy, founded by Vollenhoven and his colleague at Vrije Universiteit, professor of law Herman Dooyeweerd.

Tol, as part of his doctoral dissertation, assembled a critical edition of Vollenhoven's Isagôgè. He has compiled and edited all Vollenhoven's versions to provide a text-critical edition in Dutch. In his Philosophy in the Making D. H. Th. Vollenhoven and the Emergence of Reformed Philosophy Tol examines the development of a neo-Calvinist philosophy, particularly the part played by Vollenhoven. Tol was the translator of Vollenhoven's recently published 1926 inaugural address
