= Johann Heinrich Diemer =

Dutch biologist

Johann Heinrich (Harry) Diemer (7 November 1904 – June 1945) was born in Dronrijp, the Netherlands. His father was the reverend N. Diemer, who served at the Reformed Church at Vijfhuizen. He studied biology at the University of Leiden. He studied the ideas of Abraham Kuyper, Herman Bavinck and Jan Woltjer, and soon became an adherent of Herman Dooyeweerd and D. H. Th. Vollenhoven's Reformational philosophy.

He gave much of his free time to the Association for Calvinistic Philosophy; he was secretary to the editorial board for its journal Philosophia Reformata from its inception in 1936. During the Second World War, he became acquainted with the young biology student Jan Lever, the later professor of zoology at the Vrije Universiteit Amsterdam. After the War, Lever spoke highly of Diemer as a biologist and theoretician, and he dedicated his book, Creatie en Evolutie (1956), to Diemer.

In January 1945 Diemer was arrested by the Nazis and was sent to the Neuengamme concentration camp. He died in 1945, shortly after having been liberated by the British.

== Books ==
- Nature and Miracle (Wedge: Toronto, 1977). ISBN 0-88906-015-0.
