= Johan Mekkes =

Dutch philosopher

Johan Peter Albertus Mekkes (23 April 1898, Harderwijk – 26 July 1987, The Hague) was a Dutch philosopher. Having started his career as an officer in the Dutch army, he later studied law and philosophy. His active life as a publishing philosopher started around 1947. In 1949 he became a professor of philosophy at the University of Leiden. Due to a scarcity of translated works he is little known in the English-speaking world but he was influential for a number of other Dutch philosophers. He was one of the second generation of reformational philosophers arising from the Free University (VU) in Amsterdam, after the first generation of Herman Dooyeweerd and D. H. Th. Vollenhoven. Other second generationers were: Hendrik van Riessen, S. U. Zuidema and K. J. Popma.

== Brief outline of his thinking ==
Mekkes´s philosophy is first of all characterized by his passionate attention to the individual subjective concreteness of human life even in its societal and historical relatedness. Being dissatisfied with Kant's formalism, just as much as with the scholastic tradition seeking to hold on to the reality of some supernatural form of being, he developed an integral way of thinking in which the natural and the typically human modes of experience are equally important.

According to Mekkes, the basic shortcoming of most Western philosophical traditions is their abstractness. This has its root in the absolutization of abstractive analytical thought, as opposed to the concreteness of living persons. In response to the basic problem of human existence, philosophy has tried to find a solution via its theoretical insights. However, theory can only deal with abstractions. But the problem of human existence is not at all abstract. It is a problem of concrete, finite existence. In his concrete finiteness man lacks existential meaning. Therefore, if there is something of a solution, it is only to be found in personal concreteness. The way of supernatural religion just as much as the way of theoretical absolutization are dead-ends. So, man has to concentrate on his individual concrete subjectivity. It is there that the decision about meaning is made. But meaning appears to be a difficult something, not in the last place because man´s natural existence is finite. It being the only existence he has, the problem becomes one of love. How are we to love our reality? It is along this idea of meaning that Mekkes reads Scripture. The Biblical way of life and experience is a finite one, full of misfortune. But it is a way of basic love. Mekkes finds these two characteristics of existence, finiteness and life-by-love, in the oldest Hebraic traditions. His hermeneutics of meaning takes us back before the beginning of all later scholasticism, without turning to what are understood today as typical Jewish traditions. Since he differs in principle from the Greek tradition of the absolutization of theory, as well as from the attempt to synthesize Greek ways of thought with Hebraic thought (scholasticism), as well as from Jewish traditions, Mekkes would seem to be tapping an original source of meaning. In fact, central in his thinking is the idea of Origin, to which we are "related" in the very core of our being. This central "relation" is beyond the grasp of our theoretical insight, for it is in fact presupposed by all theoretical activity. Our being is as such originating, and its core must be of an affective nature.

Working consistently from these basic insights, he continued to follow and discuss the developments in phenomenology and existentialism. Throughout his publications he remained in discussion, at increasingly penetrating levels, with the philosophies of Scheler, Heidegger, Jaspers, Sartre. By keeping time, subjective individuality, and the problem of meaning in the forefront of his attention, he intended to contribute to a fundamental reformation of philosophy itself.

== Timeline ==
1915–1940 High-ranking officer in Dutch army

1928–1931 studied at the Advanced Military Academy in The Hague

1933–1940 Adjutant to the commander of the field army

1940 Dissertation 'Development of humanistic theories of political justice', Free University, Amsterdam

1942–1945 Imprisoned by Nazis in Stanislau POW camp. Lectured on Dooyeweerd´s De Wijsbegeerte der Wetsidee to his inmates, among whom Hans Rookmaaker [1]

1945–1975 worked for Dutch equivalent of the FBI (BVD) and then taught Christian philosophy at the school of economics in Rotterdam. Later at University of Leiden.

== Main publications ==
Mekkes wrote about 600 articles and reviews. Listed below are his most important larger publications.

- 1949 De beteekenis van het subject in de moderne waarde-philosophie onder het licht der wetsidee (The Meaning of the Subject in Modern Philosophy of Value in the Light of the Cosmonomic Idea, inaugural lecture, Leiden University Press, Leiden)
- 1961 Scheppingsopenbaring en wijsbegeerte, Kok, Kampen (translated in 2010 as Creation, Revelation, and Philosophy, Dordt College Press, Iowa)
- 1965 Teken en motief der creatuur (Creational Meaning Dynamics), Amsterdam, Buijten en Schipperheijn
- 1971 Radix, Tijd en Kennen (Radix, Time, and Knowing), Amsterdam, Buijten en Schipperheijn
- 1973 Tijd der Bezinning (Time for Reflection) in: Time and Philosophy, 2012, Dordt College Press, Iowa
