= Calvin Seerveld =

American poet and philosopher (1930–2025)

- Born: August 9, 1930; New York City, U.S.
- Died: August 5, 2025 (aged 94); Toronto, Ontario, Canada

Academic background
- Education: Calvin College; University of Michigan; Vrije Universiteit Amsterdam
- Doctoral advisor: Carlo Antoni; D. H. Th. Vollenhoven

Academic work
- Discipline: Philosophy
- Sub-discipline: Aesthetics
- School or tradition: Reformational philosophy
- Institutions: Trinity Christian College; Institute for Christian Studies
- Influenced: James K. A. Smith

Calvin George Seerveld (August 18, 1930 – August 5, 2025) was an American poet, philosopher and academic. He received a BA from Calvin College in 1952 and an MA in English literature and classics from the University of Michigan in 1953. He then went on to study under D. H. Th. Vollenhoven at the Free University (VU) in Amsterdam, where his doctoral dissertation dealt with Croce's aesthetics. It was supervised by Vollenhoven and Carlo Antoni. He then taught philosophy and German at Trinity Christian College and went on to teach philosophical aesthetics at the Institute for Christian Studies in Toronto.

Seerveld was influential in the reformational movement. He was the first to coin the term reformational to describe the philosophical aspects of neo-Calvinism. Seerveld took Herman Dooyeweerd's aesthetic modal aspect and developed Dooyeweerd's ideas. His book Rainbows for a Fallen World has influenced many Christian artists. In it he argues that "aesthetic obedience is required of everyone by the Lord-artist or not."

In 1995, a Festschrift was published in his honor with the title Pledges of Jubilee: Essays on the Arts and Culture, in Honor of Calvin G. Seerveld.

Seerveld died on August 5, 2025, at the age of 94.

Lambert Zuidervaart identifies four claims that constitute Seerveld's contribution to aesthetics:

- The aesthetic is part of the fabric of created reality, and aesthetic norms can be violated or ignored only at great cost.
- The arts, despite their variety and their continuing development, are a unified sphere distinct from other spheres of cultural endeavour, offering opportunities for vocational service to Christians today.
- The aesthetic is not limited only to the arts, just as the arts have many facets other than the aesthetic.
- The core meaning of the aesthetic – and distinguishing characteristic of the arts – is "allusiveness" or "imaginativity".

== Publications ==
- Take Hold of God and Pull Trinity Pennyasheet Press, 1966 LCCN 66-24940.
- Rainbows for a Fallen World Tuppence Press, 1980.
- On Being Human: Imaging God in a Modern World Welch Publishing, 1998.
- Take Hold of God and Pull Paternoster, 1999.
- In the Fields of the Lord: A Calvin Seerveld Reader Craig Bartholomew (Editor) Piquant/ Tuppence Press, 2000.
- Bearing Fresh Olive Leaves: Alternative Steps in Understanding Art Piquant/Toronto Tuppence Press, 2000.
- Voicing God's Psalms Eerdmans, 2005.
- Redemptive Art in Society: Sundry Writings and Occasional Lectures Dordt College Press, 2014.
- Normative Aesthetics: Sundry Writings and Occasional Lectures Dordt College Press, 2014.

== Sources ==
- In Zuidervaart and Luttikhuizen (ed.) Pledges of Jubilee: Essays on the Arts and Culture in Honour of Calvin G. Seerveld Eerdmans, 1995; cited in Bartholomew (ed.) 2000
- Seerveld, Calvin "Rainbows for the Fallen World" Tuppence Press, Toronto 2005
- Craig Bartholomew and Gideon Strauss 'Bread and not stones: an introduction to the thought of Calvin Seerveld' in Bartholomew (ed.) 2000.
