= Institute for Christian Studies =

Private graduate school in Ontario, Canada

Coordinates: 43°39′30.15″N 79°23′51.03″W

- Type: Private
- Established: 1967; 59 years ago
- Affiliations: TST, INCHE
- Academic affiliations: Toronto School of Theology
- President: Dr. Beth Green
- Faculty: 8
- Location: Toronto, Ontario, Canada
- Campus: Urban, distance
- Colours: White, red
- Nickname: ICS
- Website: www.icscanada.edu

The Institute for Christian Studies (ICS or ICS Toronto) is a private, graduate-level Reformed philosophical and theological school in Toronto, Ontario. At ICS, students and faculty take part in shared learning through participatory seminars, mentoring, and an interdisciplinary approach to study. There are several unrelated institutions bearing similar names.

== Associations ==
ICS is affiliated with the Vrije Universiteit (VU or Free University). The Vrije Universiteit has co-sponsored and co-supervised some ICS doctoral degrees. The Institute is also an affiliated institution to the Toronto School of Theology at the University of Toronto. The Toronto School of Theology allows students to take a certain number of credits towards their degree from external institutions, including ICS. ICS students may also take some of their course work at the University of Toronto Department of Philosophy. In 2025, the ICS Board of Trustees voted to end its denominational affiliation with the Christian Reformed Church in North America, as a result of the church's move to make disapproval of same-sex partnerships a binding confessional stance.

=== Other affiliations ===
The Institute for Christian Studies is part of a worldwide movement for Christian higher education, where a primary task is often the fostering of teachers for the elementary and secondary levels. In this regard, ICS offers K-12 teachers an Educational Leadership emphasis in its Master of Arts in Philosophy degree program, and prepares Master of Arts in Philosophy and PhD-level graduates to teach across disciplines in colleges and universities, or to enter into a more activist profession. With its unique emphasis among English-based Christian programs of advanced studies, ICS is also a dedicated affiliate of the International Network for Christian Higher Education (INCHE) formerly called the International Association for Promotion of Christian Higher Education (IAPCHE). INCHE is a worldwide network that advances Christian higher education through professional development, scholarship, capacity building, and communication. The network seeks to reflect both the shared view that Christ is central to those efforts and the local realities.

== Faith & Learning Network, ICS's online worldwide service ==
As part of its services to its broad circle of affiliated institutions and interested individuals, ICS maintains the Faith & Learning Network (FLN) developed over several years. Principally, FLN is a bibliographic resource that can be accessed directly from the ICS website. Its purpose is to disseminate information on the results of Christian research publications, and popularizations, to various learning levels that resonate with the vision of ICS, INCHE, and related worldwide organizations and movements.

== History ==
ICS is accredited by the Ontario government. The original model for ICS was the Central Interfaculty of the Free University (Vrije Universiteit Amsterdam), an interdisciplinary philosophy department in which the foundations of the special disciplines were to be investigated. The founders of ICS were convinced that a Christian graduate school was vital to generating comprehensively informed perspectives by biblical revelation. Henk Hart was ICS's inaugural professor with the opening of the school in 1967. In 1972, ICS moved to its current location on College Street in Toronto, and had added several faculty and had begun granting master's-level certification in philosophy. In 1980, ICS began to develop a doctoral programme in co-operation with the Free University of Amsterdam.

In 1983, ICS (then, the Association for the Advancement of Christian Scholarship, or AACS) received Royal Assent to a Charter from the Legislative Assembly of Ontario allowing ICS to grant a Master of Philosophical Foundations, and to offer a program of doctoral studies leading to a PhD conferred by the Vrije Universiteit Amsterdam. The AACS then ceased to exist and allowed the ICS to develop. In 1992, ICS was authorized to grant a Master of Worldview Studies degree, a one-year program in large part to accommodate non-philosophers teaching in Christian elementary and secondary schools. In December 2004, ICS was given ministerial permission to grant PhD and MA in Philosophy degrees on its own standing before the Crown, without a necessary mediation through the Free University Amsterdam – a process which culminated in receiving Royal Assent to grant these degrees from the Legislative Assembly of Ontario in June 2005. The strong bond between ICS and the VU, and inter-academic affiliation and cooperation, continues.

=== Background, founding and early faculty ===
More than ten years before, a lay movement was initiated amongst Dutch immigrants in Canada to promote academic studies from a Reformational Christian perspective. As a result of that movement, the Association for Reformed Scientific Studies (ARSS) was launched in 1956 in Toronto, Ontario, by a number of pastors, including Paul Schrotenboer, who emerged as key figures in close contact with H. Evan Runner, a professor of philosophy at Calvin College, Grand Rapids, Michigan. Runner had graduated from Westminster Theological Seminary, Philadelphia, and then during studies at Harvard University had served as an assistant to Werner Jaeger, a leading classicist there. Runner then went to the Free University to study philosophy under D. H. Th. Vollenhoven, as would many of the early faculty members of ICS from its inception. In 1958 the philosopher Herman Dooyeweerd visited America and suggested to the ARSS – which later became the Association for the Advancement of Christian Scholarship (AACS) – that they write an educational creed. The creed appeared several years later and was drafted by D. H. Th. Vollenhoven, during his subsequent visit and conferencing with Runner, Schrotenboer, and others. The prevailing idea was to lay the groundwork for an independent Protestant Christian university modelled after the VU (Free University of Amsterdam), not under the governance of the state or any church.

In 1967 the ARSS became the AACS which soon established the Institute. The first professor, called a Senior Member, appointed to serve the new Institute was Hendrik Hart who proceeded to teach worldview studies and philosophy, an appointment which later became specialized to Systematic Philosophy as the number of Senior Members grew. The student body also began to grow in numbers. A second Senior Member, James Olthuis who had graduated from Calvin Theological Seminary and received his doctorate from André Troost in philosophical ethics, received an appointment in ethics and philosophical theology. Then, in short order, because of a dispute at another institution in the United States, individuals in what may be called "the Chicago School" of thought within Reformational philosophy became available for ICS appointments: Calvin Seerveld in philosophical aesthetics, Arnold DeGraaff in psychology and education, and Thomas McIntire in history. What marked this entire contingent was the strong emphasis on pursuing philosophy and the philosophical foundations of other disciplines, with intense historical depth.

Upon completion of his dissertation under Herman Dooyeweerd, professor of jurisprudence at VU Amsterdam, Bernard Zylstra took up an appointment at ICS as Senior Member in political philosophy. Zylstra had been a student of Runner's as an undergraduate at Calvin College, had received his theological degree at Calvin Theological Seminary, his Master's in Law at the University of Michigan, Ann Arbor, and was the only faculty member to have studied directly under Dooyeweerd at VU Amsterdam. He had a strong influence on numerous students who are teaching in political science departments today. Many other ICS Senior Members were also students of Runner and had completed doctorates at VU. The exception among early faculty was McIntire who was writing his dissertation for the University of Pennsylvania at the time of his ICS appointment. He received it a few years later.

At some point, ICS's affiliation with VU required that a full-time Senior Member in History of Philosophy be added to the faculty, so that candidates for the PhD program in philosophy sponsored by VU could meet VU's own internal requirements regarding the credit hours in discipline of history of philosophy, a trademark of VU's philosophy faculty since its establishment under Vollenhoven. ICS was quite amenable to this arrangement. Runner, Hart, and Seerveld had all studied history of philosophy directly under Vollenhoven. A fourth Senior Member "promoted" by Vollenhoven, Albert M. Wolters, received the first ICS appointment as Senior Member in history of philosophy.

The current ICS faculty includes: Nicholas John Ansell (Theology), Ronald A. Kuipers (Philosophy of Religion), Rebekah Smick (Philosophy of Arts and Culture), Gideon Strauss (Leadership and Worldview Studies), Robert Sweetman (History of Philosophy), and Edith van der Boom (Philosophy of Education and Practice of Pedagogy). Emeritus faculty include: Doug Blomberg (Philosophy of Education), James Olthuis (Philosophical Theology), Calvin Seerveld (Philosophical Aesthetics), and Lambert Zuidervaart (Philosophy).

ICS Presidents have included: Bernard Zylstra (1978–1985), Clifford Pitt (1985–1989), Harry Fernhout (1989–2005), John Suk (2006–2008), Chris Gort (2010–2012), Tom Wolthuis and Dawn Wolthuis (2013–2014), Doug Blomberg (2014–2017), Ronald A. Kuipers (2018–2026), and Beth Green (2026-present).

== Programs ==
Institute for Christian Studies offers the following degree programs:

- Master of Worldview Studies
- Master of Arts (Philosophy) with a stream in Educational Leadership (MA-EL)
- Doctor of Philosophy

== See also ==
- List of evangelical seminaries and theological colleges
- Ontario Student Assistance Program

== Sources ==
- McIntire, C. T. (1997). "Herman Dooyeweerd in North America". In Wells, D. F. (ed.). Reformed Theology in America. Grand Rapids, Michigan: Baker Books.
