= Hans Rookmaaker =

Dutch Christian scholar and professor (1922–1977)

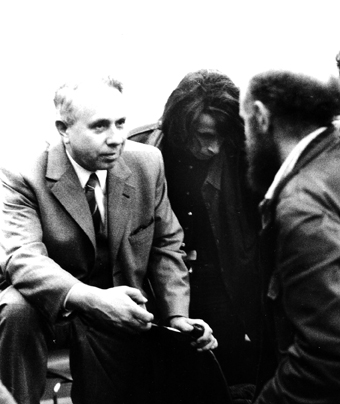
Rookmaaker with students, 1970

Henderik Roelof "Hans" Rookmaaker (February 27, 1922 – March 13, 1977) was a Dutch Christian scholar, professor, and author who wrote and lectured on art theory, art history, music, philosophy, and religion.

In 1948 he met Christian theologian Francis Schaeffer and became a member of L'Abri in Switzerland. Rookmaaker and his wife Anky opened a Dutch branch of L'Abri in 1971.

Following a doctorate in art history with a dissertation on Gauguin at the University of Amsterdam, he founded the art history department at the Free University in Amsterdam.

Rookmaaker addressed ambiguity about art among Christians and ambiguity about faith among artists. His main thesis was laid out in his 1970 publication entitled Modern Art and The Death of a Culture.

He lectured in the United Kingdom, the United States, and Canada, as well as in his native Netherlands.

Two books by Rookmaaker were published posthumously: Art Needs No Justification in 1978 and The Creative Gift : Essays on Art and the Christian Life in 1981. In 2003 The Complete Works of Hans Rookmaaker, edited by his daughter Marleen Hengelaar-Rookmaaker, was published.

== Childhood and youth ==
Born in The Hague, Netherlands, Hans was the last born in a non-Christian family of colonizers. His grandmother was half-Indonesian. He was largely raised in Indonesia, but returned to Holland to join the Royal Netherlands Navy. Already as a teenager he had begun what would become an extensive collection of African-American music. As a junior officer, he began to study ship construction at Delft University prior to the start of World War II. There, prior to the war, Rookmaaker met and became engaged to Riki Spetter, who was Jewish.

== Conversion to Christianity ==
As Rookmaaker was a naval officer, he was interned as a prisoner of war in Stanislau, now Ukraine and later on in Neubrandenburg in northern Germany. In Stanislau he met the Christian philosopher J.P.A. Mekkes who would have a lasting impact on his life. He returned home as a Christian, but was severely tested as his bride-to-be was nowhere to be found. His study of the Old Testament, dedicated to her during the camp years, never reached her. It has been established that Sophia Henriëtte Spetter was murdered in Auschwitz on September 30, 1942. Rookmaaker changed his career and took up a doctoral study in art history. In 1948, through his fiancé and bride-to-be Anky Huitker, he met Francis Schaeffer. This was the beginning of a lifelong friendship with a very fruitful exchange of ideas. Rookmaaker had a dominant influence on Schaeffer's ideas on art and culture and also introduced Schaeffer to Reformational philosophy.

Rookmaaker's famous saying "Jesus didn't come to make us Christian. Jesus came to make us fully human" formed the central theme of Dick Staub's 2010 book About You.

== Career ==
Rookmaaker stood in the tradition of Neo-Calvinism, developed in the late 19th century. The essential feature of this philosophy is the treatment of all of life as God's creation. There is no neutrality, while secularism is just another religion. Rookmaaker ventured to apply this basic viewpoint to culture. With his expert ear of black music, multi-cultural roots and after a profound change of direction, he devoted his PhD to the ideas of Paul Gauguin and how they influenced his paintings. He also was an art critic for the Dutch Christian newspaper Trouw. He edited a 12-part Fontana Records series of black music, wrote a book on this subject and developed a Christian approach to art in a book aiming at a wide audience. On the political level he wrote about art and culture for the magazine of the Reformed ARP party. By the mid '60's he was invited to start the department of art history at the Free University. His broad international perspective brought a large number of foreign students to the department at a time when this was still far from usual. Rookmaaker lived in Diemen and served as an elder in the liberated Reformed church there.

From 1955 onwards he frequently visited his friend Francis Schaeffer to lecture at the Swiss l’Abri community in Huémoz. He took Schaeffer on a tour to address Dutch audiences and started l'Abri meetings for university students in his Amsterdam home. He visited North America where he met his hero Mahalia Jackson. More and more Rookmaaker focused his career on motivating Christian believers to take culture seriously and live a life that integrates conviction and deeds. Traces of his influence are still to be found in many places, while the present awakening of Evangelicals to the arts proves Rookmaaker's prophetic stand.

== Death ==
Rookmaaker died suddenly on a Sunday in March 1977.

== See also ==
- Theological aesthetics
