= Gerrit Glas =

Dutch philosopher

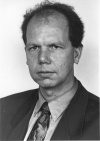
Gerrit Glas

Gerrit Glas (born 31 August 1954, Bennekom) studied Medicine at the University of Amsterdam and Philosophy at the Vrije Universiteit. He worked as a psychiatrist at the Ziekenhuis Zwolse Poort in the Netherlands and got his promotion in 1990 on the subject anxiety disorder. Since 1991, he has been a professor of Reformational philosophy at the Universiteit van Leiden. Since 2008 he has been Professor of Christian Philosophy (Dooyeweerd chair) at the VU University Amsterdam.

== Publications ==
He has written a broad chapter about Anthropology in the book Kennis en werkelijkheid. Along with Prof. Dr. Henk Jochemsen, he wrote the book Verantwoord medisch handelen.

Glas is associated with the Association for Reformational Philosophy. In 2026, he is the editor-in-chief of the Philosophia Reformata journal.

In early 2026, his h-index is 20.
