= Valentine Hepp =

Dutch theologian (1879–1950)

Valentijn Hepp (17 December 1879 – 20 August 1950), anglicised as Valentine Hepp, was a Dutch theologian.

Hepp was born in Rotterdam. He studied at the Vrije Universiteit Amsterdam, and was ordained as a minister in the Reformed Churches in 1904. In 1922 he was appointed Professor of Dogmatics at the Vrije Universiteit, succeeding Herman Bavinck. According to Jack Rogers and Donald McKim, he "shifted the emphasis to apologetics", following B. B. Warfield and the Princeton model.

Hepp went on an international speaking tour in 1924, in which he promoted the idea of an international Calvinist federation. He gave the Stone lectures at Princeton in 1930, published under the title Calvinism and the Philosophy of Nature. In it he expressed an agreement with the theology of the First Vatican Council, "that God could be known from the world of created reality through the natural light of reason." The lectures "promoted a total rethinking of the Earth’s age in geological terms," as Hepp rejected an old earth in favour of a literal six-day creation. He warmly recommended George McCready Price's views.

Hepp served on the VU faculty with D. H. Th. Vollenhoven and Herman Dooyeweerd, but increasingly found their Reformational philosophy "deformational" rather than "reformational", undermining the doctrine of Scripture and departing from the Three Forms of Unity. He also had a public dispute with Klaas Schilder: Hepp followed Abraham Kuyper's view of presumptive regeneration that "baptism sealed eternal election," while Schilder did not.

Hepp was the inaugural editor-in chief of De Reformatie magazine, established in 1920. He served in this role until conflicts among the editorial staff led him to resign in 1930.

Hepp served as Professor of Dogmatics at the VU from 1922 to 1945. He was succeeded by G. C. Berkouwer. Hepp's copy of the Corpus Reformatorum edition of John Calvin is now in the library of Westminster Theological Seminary.
