= Hendrik Hart =

Dutch-Canadian philosopher (1935–2021)

- Born: December 14, 1935; Netherlands
- Died: March 15, 2021 (aged 85)
- Other name: Henk Hart

Academic background
- Education: Vrije Universiteit Amsterdam
- Thesis: Communal Certainty and Authorized Truth (1966)
- Doctoral advisor: S. U. Zuidema
- Influences: John Dewey; Herman Dooyeweerd; Ralph Waldo Emerson; H. Evan Runner; D. H. Th. Vollenhoven

Academic work
- Discipline: Philosophy
- School or tradition: Reformational philosophy
- Doctoral students: Ronald A. Kuipers
- Main interests: Systematic philosophy
- Notable works: Understanding Our World (1984)

Hendrik Hart (December 14, 1935 – March 15, 2021), often known as Henk Hart, was a Dutch-Canadian philosopher based in Toronto.

== History ==
Hendrik Hart taught systematic philosophy at the Institute for Christian Studies, Toronto, since its founding in 1967 until his retirement in 2001. Prior to that he was head of the philosophical Institute of the Free University in Amsterdam, where he studied under D. H. Th. Vollenhoven. His doctoral dissertation was written on the topic of John Dewey's theory of verification and was supervised by Dutch philosopher S. U. Zuidema.

Hendrik Hart was an emeritus professor at the Institute for Christian Studies. He died on March 15, 2021.

== Bibliography ==
- Hart, Hendrik; K. A. Bril; and Jacob Klapwijk (editors) The Idea of a Christian philosophy: Essays in Honour of D H Th Vollenhoven (Toronto: Wedge, 1973)
- Hart, Hendrik. Setting our sights by the Morning Star (1989)
- Hart, Hendrik. Understanding Our World (Lanham, Maryland, USA: University Press of America, 1984; 2002).
- Hart, Hendrik; Johan Van Der Hoeven; and Nicolas Wolterstorff (editors) Rationality in the Calvinian Tradition (University Press of America, 1984)
- Hart, Hendrik; and Kai Nielsen. The Search for Community in a Withering Tradition (1991)
- Hart, Hendrik. "Foreword" (pages vii-xxi) in Against Nature? Types of Moral Argumentation regarding Homosexuality Pim Pronk (Translated from the Dutch by John Vriend), Wm. B. Eerdmans Publishing Company, 1993, ISBN 0-8028-0623-6
- Hart, Hendrik; and others (editors) Walking the Tightrope of Faith (Rodopi, 1999)
- Hart, Hendrik; and others (editor) An Ethos of Compassion and the Integrity of Creation (University Press of America, 1995)
- Hart, Hendrik; and William Sweet. Responses to the Enlightenment: An Exchange on Foundations, Faith, and Community (Brill, 2012).
