= S. U. Zuidema =

Dutch theologian (1906–1975)

Sytse Ulbe Zuidema (22 April 1906 – 28 September 1975) was one of the second generation of reformational philosophers arising from the Free University of Amsterdam, after the first generation of Herman Dooyeweerd and D. H. Th. Vollenhoven. Other members of the second generation included Hendrik Van Riessen, K. J. Popma and J. P. A. Mekkes.

Zuidema was born in Kampen. Prior to teaching philosophy at the Free University, he held a chair of Calvinistic philosophy at the University of Utrecht. He had also been a minister in the Reformed Churches and a missionary in Indonesia. His doctoral dissertation was on William of Ockham. Zuidema died in Amstelveen in 1975.

Robert Knudsen and Hendrik Hart both completed their doctoral dissertations in philosophy under Zuidema.

== Timeline ==
- 1925–1930: studied at the Free University of Amsterdam
- 1931–1934: pastor in Gereformeerde Kerk (Dutch Reformed Church) in Anna Paulowna Polder
- 1935–1945: missionary for the Mission in Central Java, Indonesia (Dutch East Indies)
- 1936: received doctorate from the Free University

- Dissertation: The nominalistic philosophy of William of Ockham

- 1936–1946: missionary minister at Soerakarta (Solo). During World War II, he was held at a Japanese prisoner of war camp on Java.
- 1946: returned to the Netherlands
- 1948: Chair of Christian Philosophy at University of Utrecht and at the Free University
- 1954 onwards: taught only at the Free University.

== Publications ==
- Kierkegaard in Modern Thinkers, an International Library of Philosophy and theology (Presbyterian & Reformed: Philadelphia)
- Sartre in Modern Thinkers, an International Library of Philosophy and theology (Presbyterian & Reformed: Philadelphia)
- Communication and Confrontation: A Philosophical Appraisal and Critique of Modern Society and Contemporary Thought. Assen/Kampen Royal VanGorcum Ltd, 1972
