= K. J. Popma =

Klaas Johan Popma (1903–1986) was one of the second generation of reformational philosophers arising from the Free University (VU) in Amsterdam, after the first generation of Herman Dooyeweerd and D. H. Th. Vollenhoven. Other second generationers were: Hendrik Van Riessen, S. U. Zuidema and J. P. A. Mekkes.

== Timeline ==
- 1903 born in The Hague, Netherlands.
- 1928-1955 taught classical languages in Gymnasium (high school) in Apeldoorn.
- 1931 received doctorate in classical languages from University of Leiden.
- 1936 Classical, human, and cynic published in Philosophia Reformata.
- 1954 Chair of Christian philosophy in Utrecht and Groningen.

== Publications ==
- A Battle for Righteousness: The Message of the Book of Job, transl. J. Van Meggelen, (Essence: Ontario, 1998. )
