= H. Evan Runner =

American philosopher and academic (1916–2002)

- Born: Howard Evan Runner; January 28, 1916; Oxford, Pennsylvania, U.S.
- Died: March 14, 2002 (aged 86)
- Spouse: Elisabeth Wichers Runner

Academic background
- Education: Wheaton College; Westminster Theological Seminary; Vrije Universiteit Amsterdam
- Influences: Herman Dooyeweerd; Abraham Kuyper; Cornelius Van Til

Academic work
- Discipline: Philosophy
- School or tradition: Reformational philosophy
- Influenced: Hendrik Hart; James Olthuis; Elaine Storkey; Albert M. Wolters; Bernard Zylstra

Howard Evan Runner (January 28, 1916 – March 14, 2002) was professor of philosophy at Calvin College from 1951 until his retirement in 1981.

Runner was born in Oxford, Pennsylvania and graduated from Wheaton College in Illinois, Westminster Theological Seminary in Philadelphia (where he was deeply influenced by the thought of Professor Cornelius Van Til), and The Free University of Amsterdam. It was at the Free University that he was taught by Herman Dooyeweerd and D. H. Th. Vollenhoven, whose ideas relating to the construction of a whole new way of doing philosophy Christianly from a biblical basis radically changed the direction of his life, and whose teachings he later brought to North America. Runner's dissertation applied D. H. Th. Vollenhoven's problem-historical method to Aristotle's Physics. Runner had also studied at Harvard University, where he was a Junior Fellow of the Society of Fellows, and at the University of Pennsylvania, where he engaged in intensive studies in Greek and philosophy.

Early in his career at Calvin College he organized the Groen van Prinsterer Society (known popularly as the 'Groen Club'), which brought him together with students specifically interested in discussing issues relating Christianity to culture, and the necessity Runner saw of Christian cultural organization. He was also greatly influential in the setting up of the Association for Reformed Scientific Studies (ARSS) in 1956 – which later became the Association for the Advancement of Christian Scholarship (AACS). The AACS eventually became the Institute for Christian Studies (ICS). The ICS's first senior members were all students of Runner. His influence extended to the UK, through the work of Elaine Storkey and Richard Russell who had studied with him in Canada, and through David and Ruth Hanson, who set up the West Yorkshire School of Christian Studies.

Currently, both Redeemer University College (RUC) and the ICS have chairs in Runner's honor. RUC has the H. Evan Runner Chair in Philosophy, currently held by Craig Bartholomew, while the ICS has the H. Evan Runner Chair in the History of Philosophy, currently held by Robert Sweetman.

== Works ==
- The Relation of the Bible to Learning Reprint: Toronto: Wedge, 1974.
- Scriptural Religion and Political Task Reprint: Toronto: Wedge, 1974.
- 'ARSS and its reorganization' Calvinist Contact 1962: 5-7
- 'Dooyeweerd's Passing: An Appreciation' The Banner April 22, 1977: 20-23.
- 'Interview with Dr. H. Evan Runner' by Harry Van Dyke and Albert M. Wolters in Hearing and Doing pp. 333–361
- Vollenhoven's History of the Presocratic Philosophers
- Verbonds-geschiedenis (Promise and Deliverance) by S.G. De Graaf; Translated by H. Evan Runner and his wife Ellen.

== Festschrifts ==
- Bernard Zylstra, "Preface to Runner," In The Relation of the Bible to Learning (Paideia Press, 1982, 5th edn) extract
- John Kraay & Anthony Tol (eds), Hearing and Doing: Philosophical Essays dedicated to H. Evan Runner (Wedge, 1979)
- Life Is Religion: Essays in Honor of H. Evan Runner (Paideia Press, 1981)
