= E. L. Hebden Taylor =

British Reformational Anglican vicar

Revd Eustace (a.k.a. Stacey) Lovatt Hebden Taylor (25 July 1925 – 2006) was a Reformational Anglican vicar. He was the son of missionaries and born in Katanga, Belgian Congo.

He enlisted in the Royal Navy at the start of the Second World War. After the war he returned to England to study at Trinity Hall, Cambridge. After graduation, he worked for the Hudson's Bay Company in Vancouver. There he was married and became an Anglican priest. He subsequently went as a missionary to the Yukon. They returned to England in 1963 where he became vicar at St John's, Greengates, Bradford. He was then offered a place at Dordt College, Iowa, where he became Professor of History and Sociology.

Taylor was a creationist.

== Publications ==
- The New Legality: In the Light of the Christian Philosophy of Law (Craig Press/ P&R, 1967)
- Evolution and the Reformation of Biology (Craig Press, 1967)
- The Christian Philosophy of Law, Politics, and the State (Craig Press, 1969)
- The Reformational Understanding of Family and Marriage (Craig Press, 1970)
- Reformation or Revolution (Craig Press, 1970)
- The Origin and Nature of Modern Capitalism (Christian Studies Center, 1975)
- Economics, Money and Banking (Craig Press, 1978)
