= Bernard Zylstra =

Dutch political theory

- Born: Bernard Zijlstra; 1934; Netherlands
- Died: 1986 (aged 51–52)
- Other name: Berny Zylstra
- Spouse: Josina Van Nuis (m. 1959)

Academic background
- Education: Calvin College; Calvin Theological Seminary; University of Michigan; Vrije Universiteit Amsterdam
- Thesis: From Pluralism to Collectivism (1968)
- Doctoral advisor: Herman Dooyeweerd
- Influences: H. Evan Runner

Academic work
- Discipline: Philosophy; political studies
- Sub-discipline: Political theory
- School or tradition: Reformational philosophy
- Institutions: Vrije Universiteit Amsterdam; Institute for Christian Studies
- Influenced: Bruce Clemenger; James Skillen

Bernard Zylstra (born Zijlstra; 1934–1986) was the principal and the professor of political theory at the Institute for Christian Studies in Toronto, Ontario, Canada. His influence on the development of Christian scholarship extended to the US, UK, South Africa, and Australia.

== Early life and education ==
Zylstra was born in 1934 to Peter Zylstra and Trijntje Hekstra in the Netherlands. His brother was Uko Zylstra, the professor of biology at Calvin College in Grand Rapids, Michigan. Zylstra married Josina Van Nuis on 26 August 1959.

Zylstra received a Bachelor of Arts degree from Calvin College in 1955, a Master of Divinity degree from Calvin Theological Seminary in 1958, and a Bachelor of Laws degree from the University of Michigan in 1961. He received a Master of Laws degree in 1964 and a Doctor of Juridical Science degree in 1968 from Vrije Universiteit Amsterdam, where he studied under Herman Dooyeweerd. Zylstra's dissertation was on the political theory of Harold Laski.

== Career ==
Later, Zylstra would publish the related From Pluralism to Collectivism: The Development of Harold Laski's Political Thought in 1968. He would also come to edit Dooyeweerd's publication Roots of Western Culture (1979) and co-edit another publication Contours of Christian Philosophy by L. Kalsbeek's in 1975.
