= Craig Bartholomew =

South African academic

Craig G. Bartholomew
- Craig Bartholomew sometime prior to 2009
- Born: 3 August 1961 (age 65); Pinetown, KwaZulu-Natal, South Africa
- Occupations: Academic philosopher and theologian
- Title: H. Evan Runner Professor of philosophy

Academic background
- Education: University of South Africa; Oxford University; Potchefstroom University
- Alma mater: Bristol University (PhD)
- Thesis: Reading Ecclesiastes: Old Testament Exegesis and Hermeneutical Theory (1997)
- Influences: John Calvin, Abraham Kuyper, Herman Dooyeweerd

Academic work
- Era: 21st-century philosophy
- School or tradition: Calvinism · Philosophy
- Institutions: Tyndale House (Cambridge)
- Main interests: Postmodernism · Biblical Interpretation · OT Wisdom
- Notable works: The Drama of Scripture: Finding our Place in the Biblical Story (2004)

Craig G. Bartholomew (MA, Potchefstroom University, PhD, Bristol University) is the director of the Kirby Laing Centre for Public Theology. He was senior research fellow at the University of Gloucestershire and H. Evan Runner Professor of philosophy at Redeemer University.

== Biography ==
Bartholomew completed a master's degree through Potchefstroom University, and finished his doctorate on Ecclesiastes in the UK in 1997. 2004-2017 he held the H. Evan Runner Chair in Philosophy at Redeemer University College. In 2017 he became director of the Kirby Laing Institute for Christian Ethics.

Bartholomew was editor of Journal of Theological Interpretation.

== External sources ==
- Kirby Laing Institute for Christian Ethics
- All of Life Redeemed
- Biblical Theology Authors Page
- Bible Society
