= Christian worldview =

Christian view of the world

Christian worldview (also called biblical worldview) refers to the framework of ideas and beliefs through which a Christian individual, group, or culture interprets the world and interacts with it. Various denominations of Christianity have differing worldviews on some issues based on biblical interpretation, but many thematic elements are commonly agreed-upon within the Christian worldview.

== Definition ==
According to Leo Apostel, a worldview is an ontology, or a descriptive model of the world. It should comprise these six elements:

1. An explanation of the world
2. An eschatology, answering the question "where are we heading?"
3. Values, answers to ethical questions: "What should we do?" In this context, "What would Jesus do?"
4. A praxeology, or methodology, or theory of action.: "How should we attain our goals?"
5. An epistemology, or theory of knowledge. "What is true and false?" (See, for example John 18:38)
6. An etiology. A constructed world-view should contain an account of its own "building blocks," its origins and construction.

== Differing Christian worldviews ==
Different denominations of Christianity have varying worldviews. There are varieties of particulars within the Christian worldview, and disputes of the meaning of concepts in a Christian worldview. Certain thematic elements are common within the Christian worldview. For instance, Northrop Frye indicated as the central clusters of the system of metaphors in the Bible – mountain, garden, and cave. A similar thematic representation of Christian worldview in the Reformed tradition has been formulated as Creation, Fall, Redemption and Consummation. The symbolic term Christian worldview has been called a "defining marker of American evangelical culture." Simon P. Kennedy has argued that Christian worldview is a "combat concept", a symptom of a community that sees itself as under siege from a hostile secular world.

With regard to Calvinist theology, Reformed theologian R. C. Sproul argues that "Reformed theology so far transcends the mere five points of Calvinism that it is an entire worldview. It is covenantal. It is sacramental. It is committed to transforming culture. It is subordinate to the operation of God the Holy Spirit, and it has a rich framework for understanding the entirety of the counsel of God revealed in the Bible." Simon P. Kennedy, a Reformed historian, has been critical of the typical uses of the worldview concept in this tradition, especially as it is deployed in Christian education contexts.

== Worldview vs. doctrine ==
The U.S. use of the term worldview in Christian rhetoric can be traced to the evangelical Reformed philosopher H. Evan Runner of Calvin College in Grand Rapids, Michigan. Runner used the term in his evangelical Reformed community in North America, promoting the worldview concept from a philosophical concept to a synonym for doctrine.

== Key people and literary works within Protestant evangelicalism ==
- William Lane Craig and J. P. Moreland. Philosophical Foundations for a Christian Worldview. IVP Academic (2003).
- Gordon H. Clark. A Christian View of Men and Things: An Introduction to Philosophy. Grand Rapids, MI: Eerdmans (1951); reprint, Grand Rapids, MI: Baker (1981).
- Herman Dooyeweerd. A New Critique of Theoretical Thought. Jordan Station, Ont.: Paideia Press (1984) online summary with excerpts
- Carl F. H. Henry. God, Revelation, and Authority. Waco, TX: Word (1976).
- Abraham Kuyper. Lectures on Calvinism. Grand Rapids, MI: Eerdmans (1931) online version
- James Orr. The Christian View of God and the World. New York: Charles Scribner's Sons (1893) online version
- Francis Schaeffer. The Complete Works of Francis A. Schaeffer: A Christian Worldview. Wheaton, IL: Crossway (1982).
- C. Fred Smith. "Developing a Biblical Worldview: Seeing Things God's Way." Nashville, TN: B and H Academic (2015)

== See also ==
- Christianese
- Interpretatio Christiana
