= Hendrik van Riessen =

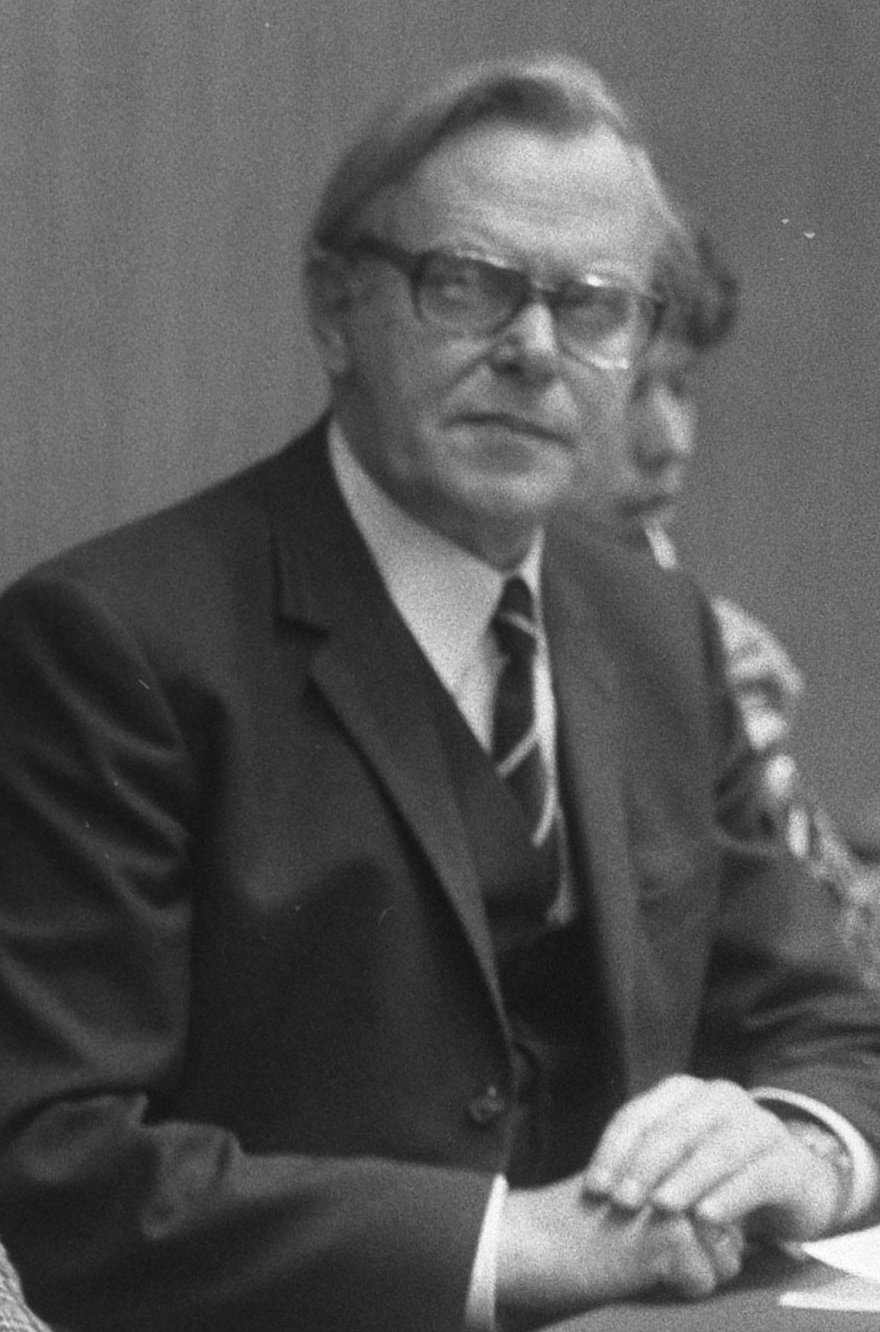
Hendrik van Riessen (1974)

Hendrik Van Riessen (17 August 1911, in Bloemendaal, North Holland – 28 February 2000, in Bloemendaal) was one of the second generation of reformational philosophers arising from the Free University (VU) in Amsterdam, after the first generation of Herman Dooyeweerd and D. H. Th. Vollenhoven. Other second generationers were: K. J. Popma, S. U. Zuidema and J. P. A. Mekkes.

From 1951 he was professor at the Institute of Technology of Delft in the Netherlands. He held graduate degrees in engineering and in philosophy. He studied philosophy at the Free University in Amsterdam under D. H. Th. Vollenhoven. He was an active participant in the Underground Movement during the Nazi occupation.

Carl Mitcham gave the first Van Riessen memorial lecture in April 2006.

== Publications ==
- Filosofie en techniek (Philosophy and Technique)
- The Society of the Future (transl D. H. Freeman) (Presbyterian and Reformed, 1957)
- Nietzsche An International Library of Philosophy and Theology (Presbyterian and Reformed, 1960)
- The relation of the Bible to science (Christian perspectives) (Pella, 1960)
