= Richard Rorty: Contemporary American Thinkers =

Philosophy book

- Richard Rorty cover
- Author: Ronald A. Kuipers
- Language: English
- Subject: Richard Rorty
- Publisher: Bloomsbury Publishing
- Publication date: 2012
- Media type: Print
- Pages: 224
- ISBN: 978-1441192387
- Preceded by: Daniel Dennett: Contemporary American Thinkers

Richard Rorty: Contemporary American Thinkers is a 2012 book on the writings of American philosopher Richard Rorty, written by Ronald A. Kuipers. The release of the book marked Bloomsbury's fifth publication in their Contemporary American Thinkers series.

== Synopsis ==
In a review published in Contemporary Pragmatism, Jonathan Salem-Wiseman wrote "the task of clarifying Rorty's philosophical relationships with Dewey, Sellars, Quine, and Davidson is, in many respects, the central task and the greatest accomplishment of this volume. To pull thus off, Kuipers approaches Rorty's work both chronologically and thematically." In 2014, Philosophy, the journal of the Royal Institute of Philosophy, stated that "in the view of Ronald A. Kuipers in his book Richard Rorty, Rorty was a quintessentially American thinker, an exponent not just of American pragmatism, but also of the American sublime."

== Reception ==
Nancy Frankenberry stated that in comparison with other introductory books on the philosophy of Richard Rorty, Kuipers' text "provides the best introduction to all facets of Rorty's work, not only for the beginning reader but also for anyone who cares about the relevance of philosophy today." In 2012, Jeffrey Stout described Kuipers' text as "a well-informed, interesting, and clear overview of Richard Rorty's contributions to American thought," adding that he found the text "especially instructive on Rorty's thinking about religion and politics.”
