= Albert M. Wolters =

- Born: Albert Marten Wolters; September 9, 1942 (age 84); Netherlands

Academic background
- Education: Calvin College; Vrije Universiteit Amsterdam; McMaster University
- Influences: Abraham Kuyper; H. Evan Runner

Academic work
- Discipline: Biblical studies; philosophy
- School or tradition: Neo-Calvinism
- Institutions: Redeemer University College
- Main interests: Copper Scroll
- Notable works: Creation Regained (1985)

Albert Marten "Al" Wolters (born 1942) is an emeritus professor of religion at Redeemer University in Ancaster, Ontario (near Hamilton). He has been described as a "towering figure" in the Kuyperian neo-Calvinist pantheon.

== Early life and education ==
Born in the Netherlands on September 9, 1942, Wolters studied at Calvin College (BA, 1964), the Free University of Amsterdam (PhD, 1972), and McMaster University (MA, 1987).

== Publications ==
Wolters' best-known book is Creation Regained: Biblical Basics for a Reformational Worldview, originally published in 1985 with a second edition in 2005. It has been translated into Spanish and other languages.

Following in the tradition of Reformed writers such as Abraham Kuyper, Herman Bavinck, Herman Dooyeweerd, and D. H. Th. Vollenhoven, Wolters outlines a worldview based around the categories of creation, fall, and redemption.

Wolters has made a particular study of the Copper Scroll, one of the Dead Sea Scrolls. He has published multiple papers on the subject as well as a pamphlet The Copper Scroll: Overview, Text and Translation as a supplement to the Journal for the Study of the Old Testament.

Wolters has published several articles on the book of Zechariah, and a major commentary which focuses on the way the book of Zechariah has been interpreted through history.
