= Reformational philosophy =

Neo-Calvinistic movement

Reformational philosophy of society is a neo-Calvinistic movement pioneered by Herman Dooyeweerd and D. H. Th. Vollenhoven that seeks to develop philosophical thought in a Reformed Christian direction. It is related to the idea of a political community and can be traced back to 16th-century monarchomach thinking. This school of thought had a particular influence in the Netherlands and contributed to the country being the first modern nation state. Freedom of conscience and the fight against tyranny have a special place in the Reformational philosophy of society.

== Historical overview ==
In 1926 two Calvinist scholars were appointed to positions in the Free University (VU) in Amsterdam, the Netherlands. Both had completed their education there and had been influenced by the thought of its founder Abraham Kuyper, whose brand of Neo-Calvinism had made a significant impact on the politics and culture of Dutch society. D. H. Th. Vollenhoven was appointed as the university's first full-time professor of philosophy and his brother-in-law, Herman Dooyeweerd, was appointed to the law faculty.

Both men had already been cooperating in the development of a uniquely Christian philosophy and their labours began to see considerable fruit over the next ten years. The mid-1930s saw a series of significant publications culminating in Dooyeweerd's magnum opus De Wijsbegeerte der Wetsidee ('The Philosophy of the Cosmonomic Idea') in three volumes. At this time Vollenhoven organised the Association for Calvinistic Philosophy, which he served as president until his retirement in 1963, by then an international organisation with over 500 members. Dooyeweerd became the first editor of the association's academic journal Philosophia Reformata.

After the Second World War, the Association for Calvinistic Philosophy took advantage of a legal provision which, by establishing a second organization for that purpose, allowed those interested in the further project to appoint professors in special chairs at state universities. Johan Mekkes was appointed in 1947 at Rotterdam, Leiden and Eindhoven, K. J. Popma at Groningen in 1948 and later Utrecht (1955), S. U. Zuidema at the Free University and Utrecht in 1948 and Hendrik Van Riessen at Delft and Eindhoven in 1951.

In the 1950s and 1960s, mainly through the influence of Vollenhoven's American student H. Evan Runner, many North Americans with Dutch roots came to study under these Calvinistic philosophers increasing the influence of this new philosophy. Dooyeweerd also revised his earlier work for English publication under the title A New Critique of Theoretical Thought. As a consequence, Dooyeweerd has received greatest exposure outside of the Netherlands.

Although Calvinistic in roots, reformational philosophy has always been ecumenical in outlook. Dooyeweerd later rejected the term Calvinistic, wishing his philosophy to be seen as "Reformational-Ecumenical" Christian. On the 50th anniversary of the Association, Jacob Klapwijk summarized some of the central themes of reformational philosophy and looked forward to its continuing contributions. This article was titled "Reformational Philosophy on the Boundary Between the Past and the Future". In 1995 the Association for Calvinistic Philosophy became the Association for Reformational Philosophy, while its supporting foundation became the Foundation for Christian Philosophy (Stichting voor Christelijke Filosofie, with the new Dutch spelling).

== Different generations ==
Jan-Willem Dijkshoorn outlines four different generations of Dutch reformational philosophers. The first generation were Vollenhoven and Dooyeweerd; the second generation Hendrik Van Riessen, K. J. Popma, S. U. Zuidema and Johan Mekkes; the third generation Egbert Schuurman, Henk Geertsema and Sander Griffioen; and the fourth generation Jan Hoogland. Others in the third generation or the fourth or in between include Maarten Verkerk, whose book in translation will be read widely in North America, Trust and Power on the Shop Floor: An Ethnographical, Ethical, and Philosophical Study on Responsible Behaviour in Industrial Organizations.

The second generation also includes H. Evan Runner, who studied in the Netherlands but thereafter returned to the United States to teach at Calvin College in Grand Rapids, Michigan. Runner was a student of Vollenhoven who had also studied Dooyeweerd's work closely. Runner returned to the US to teach, and from there sent back to the VU students to work on their doctorates under Vollenhoven in philosophy, one to do so under Dooyeweerd in jurisprudence, and others in an array of additional disciplines. Many of these were children of families which had emigrated from the Netherlands to Canada or the US, studied under H. Evan Runner at Calvin College, returned to the VU bilingual, and completed their doctorates. Some would stay in the Netherlands and the VU, some would return to North America. Another figure of this generation is the biologist Johann H. Diemer, the first secretary to the editorial board of Philosophia Reformata, whose work Nature and Miracle is still being read. He died early, at the age of 41, after having been a Nazi concentration camp prisoner.

In North America, the Institute for Christian Studies (ICS) was established in Toronto to offer graduate degrees. The ICS has had a long cooperative relationship with the VU, the University of Toronto's federation of Theological Schools, and more recently, also the university's Faculty of Philosophy. Thus, in North America, there is an active second generation of reformational philosophers in Calvin Seerveld; a third generation including Hendrik Hart, Bernard Zylstra (deceased), James Olthius, Arnold DeGraaff (afterward a practicing psychotherapist for 30 years and co-founder of Mono Therapy Center, Mono, Ontario), Thomas McIntire, Albert M. Wolters, William Rowe, George VanderVelde (a theologian who took his doctorate under G. C. Berkouwer); and fourth-generationers Paul Marshall and Robert Sweetman may be added – of those who have had active professorial roles at ICS.

There is now a numerous body of doctoral graduates of ICS through its cooperative program with the VU. At ICS itself, these now include:

- Lambert Zuidervaart (Senior Member of systematic philosophy at ICS)
- Ronald A. Kuipers (Senior Member of philosophy of religion at ICS)
- Doug Blomberg (who consulted with Dooyeweerd in regard to his dissertation in philosophy of education, written for an Australian university and is now Senior Member of Philosophy of Education at ICS)

Further graduates include:

- Adrienne Dengerink Chaplin (VU graduate, former ICS student, former Senior Member in Philosophical Aesthetics at ICS, now speaking and writing in England where her husband has taken a key post)
- Jonathan Chaplin (ICS student, London School of Economics in political science, former professor ICS political theory, now Kirby Laing Institute for Christian Ethics at Tyndale House, Cambridge, UK.)
- James K. A. Smith (M.Phil. F. at ICS, PhD at Villanova under John D. Caputo). Smith has found a place for himself at the interface of Reformational Philosophy, Deconstruction, and Radical orthodoxy.

Many other names among the generations could be included, for instance, among those who taught at ICS, Redeemer University College, and College of New Jersey (formerly Trenton State University, NJ), and .

- Dr Albert Wolters, studied under Runner, then Vollenhoven, taught at ICS, taught at Redeemer University College (Ontario), now retired, presently Research Fellow at the new Paideia Centre for Public Theology (Ancaster, Ontario).
- Dr Roy A. Clouser, now retired, has done much to popularise Reformational philosophy with his The Myth of Religious Neutrality (1st edn 1991; revd edn 2005).
- In 2009, Danie Strauss published an extensive investigation of the relationship between philosophy and the special sciences: Philosophy: Discipline of the Disciplines (715 pages), Grand Rapids: Paideia Press.

== Main claims ==
There are two main claims that characterise reformational philosophy.

=== Religious roots of philosophical thought ===
Reformational philosophy rejects the view that theoretical thought, including philosophical thought, is autonomous. The view that theoretical thinking is a purely rational activity; has a purely rational ground, or requires no pre-theoretical conditions or commitments for its possibility cannot be sustained. Any attempt to explain theoretical thought without acknowledging non-theoretical factors is destined to fall into irresolvable antinomies. The conclusion of Dooyeweerd's "transcendental critique of theoretical thought" is that philosophy cannot function without religious-deep presuppositions. His analysis of the influence of religious ground-motives in the history of philosophy – particularly that of nature-freedom in modern humanism (Dooyeweerd 1997 Vol. 1) – is illustrative of this conclusion.

=== Modal theory ===
Reformational philosophy has always been concerned that philosophy be fruitful for the special sciences; the theory of irreducible modal aspects has had the greatest influence in this respect. Although accounts differ, it is customary to distinguish fifteen modal aspects which evince the ways or modes we experience reality. These are: numerical, spatial, kinematic, physical, organic, psychical, logical, historical, linguistic, social, economic, aesthetic, legal, moral and mystical. Each mode expresses itself in all the other modes through analogies within the mode that either "anticipate" later modes or "retrocipate" earlier modes. Any non-reductionist account of reality must acknowledge the particular ways each entity, action or process function within all of the modal aspects or else fall, once again, into antinomies (Dooyeweerd 1997 Vol. 2).
