= Ronald A. Kuipers =

Canadian philosopher

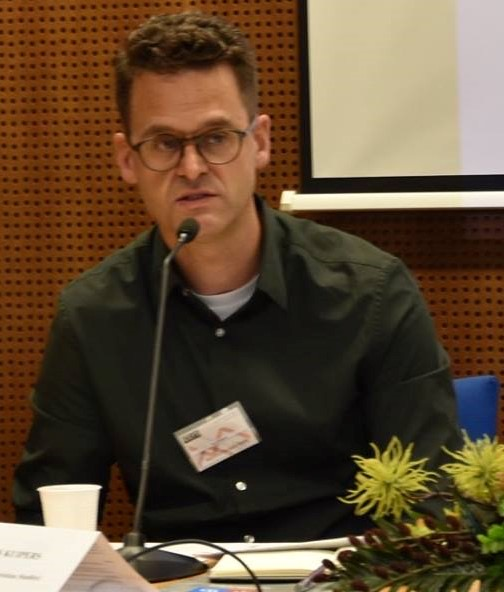
- Kuipers in 2017
- Family: Gerry Kuipers (father)

Education
- Education: Vrije Universiteit Amsterdam
- Doctoral advisor: Hendrik Hart and Henk Vroom

Philosophical work
- Main interests: Philosophy of religion, pragmatism

Ronald A. Kuipers is a Canadian philosopher of religion based in Toronto, Ontario.

== History ==
Ronald A. Kuipers was born in Edmonton, Canada. From 1989 to 1990, Kuipers worked as the Entertainment Editor of The Gateway newspaper. In 2012, Kuipers became an associate professor of the philosophy of religion at the Institute for Christian Studies in Toronto, Canada.

As of 2018, Kuipers is President of the Institute for Christian Studies. He is also the Director of the ICS Centre for Philosophy, Religion, and Social Ethics.

== Scholarship ==
Ronald A. Kuipers began publishing in the mid-1990s. In 1997, Kuipers published his first monograph Solidarity and the Stranger, focused on the philosophy of Richard Rorty. The book was reviewed in The Review of Metaphysics, Religious Studies Review, and Studies in Religion. In 2010, Kuipers presented the "What's So Critical About Faith" lecture series at the University of Calgary and the King's University.

In 2012, Kuipers published Richard Rorty, the fifth volume in Bloomsbury's Contemporary American Thinkers series.

== Bibliography ==
As per OCLC WorldCat.

- Solidarity and the Stranger: Themes in the Social Philosophy of Richard Rorty, 1997, ISBN 9780761808893
- Walking the Tightrope of Faith: Philosophical Conversations About Reason and Religion, 1999, ISBN 9789042007161
- Critical Faith: Toward a Renewed Understanding of Religious Life and Its Public Accountability, 2002, ISBN 9789042008533
- Philosophy as Responsibility: A Celebration of Hendrik Hart's Contribution to the Discipline, 2002, ISBN 9780761824268
- Richard Rorty: Contemporary American Thinkers, 2012, ISBN 9781441182388
