= Paul Otto (historian) =

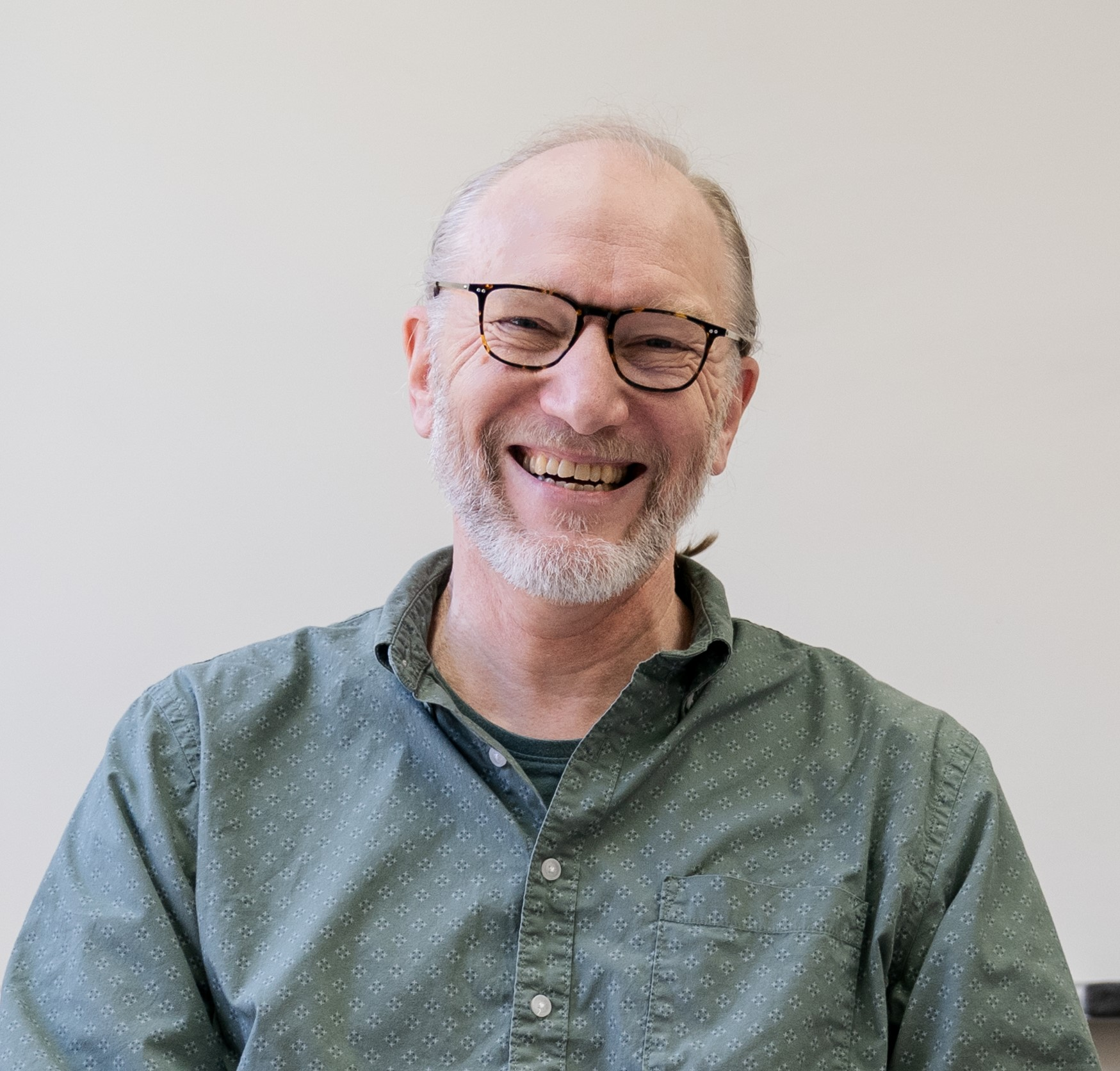
Paul Otto, George Fox University, April 2024

Paul Otto is an American historian and professor emeritus of History at George Fox University. His main research is early America with specialty in Dutch-Native American relations, Native American history, and the history of wampum.

== Education and career ==
Otto received his BA (1987) from Dordt University, his MA (1990) from Western Washington University, and his PhD (1995) in early American and Native American history at Indiana University Bloomington. Otto has taught at Calvin University, Dordt University, and George Fox University in Newberg, Oregon from 2002 to 2024. He served as the chair of their History, Sociology, & Politics Department, 2005–2019. Over his career he taught courses on American history, Latin America, and Southern Africa, with a particular interest in issues of race and ethnicity. Outside of the discipline of history, he has led seminars on Great Books and taught philosophy and literature. In 2010, Otto received the annual faculty achievement award for research as an undergraduate professor at George Fox University.

== Scholarship ==
Otto's scholarship has focused on the relations between the Dutch and Native Americans in colonial New York. Otto was recognized as a Fulbright scholar in the Netherlands in 1993–1994. His scholarship and first book, The Dutch-Munsee Encounter in America: The Struggle for Sovereignty in the Hudson Valley, published by Berghahn Press, led him to receive the Hendricks Award in 1998. Further, Otto has been recognized as a fellow of the New Netherland Institute and the Holland Society of New York. His work has also been cited in history textbooks covering the period, such as Eric Nellis's Empire of Regions, and Alan Gallay's Colonial & Revolutionary America, and in journal articles such as one by Nancy Hagedorn, who cited Otto's work as exemplifying a trend in American historical scholarship towards a "more intricate and subtle, but also more representative, vision of early America".

Since 2014, Otto has incorporated role-immersion pedagogy in his classes, primarily through Reacting games. He is also an author of several unpublished role-immersion games set in South Africa and is co-author with Verdis LeVar Robinson of the Reacting game Bacon’s Rebellion, 1676-1677: Race, Class, and Frontier Conflict in Colonial Virginia.

Otto is currently researching wampum in the colonial northeast, and has delivered lectures on the subject at forums such as State University of New York at New Paltz's Henry Hudson Symposium.

He has received an Andrew Mellon Fellowship at the Henry E. Huntington Library (San Marino, California), an Earhart Research Grant, and a National Endowment for the Humanities Summer Stipend. In 2015–2016, he was a fellow at the National Humanities Center. He has also served as co-editor of the Journal of Early American History.

== Publications ==
- The Dutch-Munsee Encounter in America: The Struggle for Sovereignty in the Hudson Valley. New York: Berghahn Press, 2006.
- Permeable Borders: History, Theory, Policy, and Practice in the United States. Co-editor with Susanne Bertheir-Foglar. New York: Berghahn Press, 2020.
- Bacon’s Rebellion, 1676-1677: Race, Class, and Frontier Conflict in Colonial Virginia. Co-authored with Verdis LeVar Robinson. Chapel Hill: University of North Carolina Press, 2024.
- "Wampum: The Transfer and Creation of Rituals on the Early American Frontier." In Ritual Dynamics and the Science of Ritual, volume 5, Transfer and Spaces, ed. Gita Dharampal-Frick, Robert Langer, and Niles Holger Petersen, pages 171–188. Wiesbaden: Harrassowitz Books, 2010.
- "Intercultural Relations between Natives and Europeans in New Netherland." In Four Centuries of Dutch-American Relations, 1609-2009, ed. Cornelis A. van Minnen, Hans Krabbendam, and Giles Scott-Smith, pages 178–191. Albany: State University of New York Press, 2009.
- “The Origins of New Netherland: Interpreting Native American Responses to Henry Hudson's Visit.” Itinerario (European Journal of Overseas History) 18, number 2 (1994): pages 22–39.
- “Reassessing American Frontier Theory: Culture, Cultural Relativism, and the Middle Ground.” In Frontiers and Boundaries in United States History, ed. Cornelis A. van Minnen & Sylvia Hinton, pages 27–38. Amsterdam: VU University Press, 2004.
