= Roy A. Clouser =

American philosopher

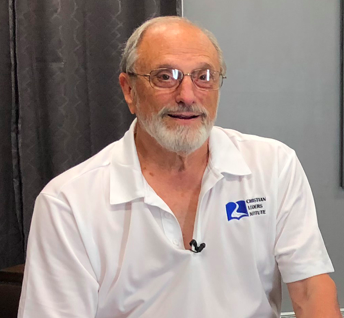
- Education: Gordon College (BA); Reformed Episcopal Seminary (BD); Clouser began grad school at Harvard in The History and Philosophy of Religion, but transferred when his advisor warned that                       the program would be discontinued and recommended transferring to Penn. [University of Pennsylvania]] (MA and PhD)
- Occupation: Professor Emeritus of the College of New Jersey

Roy A. Clouser was professor emeritus of the College of New Jersey. He served as professor of philosophy, religion, and logic at the college since 1968, and was adjunct asst prof at Rutgers in symbolic logic. He now serves as the resident philosopher of Christian Leaders Institute.

Clouser earned his BA from Gordon College (Massachusetts), a BD from Reformed Episcopal Seminary, and an MA and PhD from the University of Pennsylvania. His philosophy PhD from the University of Pennsylvania was received in 1972 for his dissertation entitled Transcendental Critique, Ontological Reduction, and Religious Belief in the Philosophy of Herman Dooyeweerd.

== Contribution ==
Clouser wrote The Myth of Religious Neutrality, where he contextualized Herman Dooyeweerd's philosophy into the general audience of British and American academic dialogue. Bruce C Wearne (BA, MSocSci, PhD), Member, Editorial Board, The American Sociologist wrote,

Clouser's long-term academic involvement in the American academy has given an encouraging demonstration that a biblically-directed Christian scholarship is possible within academic institutions that cannot avoid reflecting the secularised presumptions of a post-modern, post-humanist pagan society

== Philosophic Theory Making ==
Clouser brought clarity to Herman Dooyeweerd's theory of reality by defining several key terms and clearing up some puzzlements peculiar to English-speaking readers. Clouser cites Dooyeweerd's aspects of reality with these categories

- Fiduciary
- Ethical
- Justitial
- Aesthetic
- Economic
- Social
- Linguistic
- Historical
- Logical
- Sensory
- Biotic
- Physical
- Kinetic
- Spatial
- Quantitative

Clouser said about these aspects of reality:

I will call these kinds of properties-and-laws “aspects” of the things we experience, and I am going to refer to the disciplines devoted to their study as “sciences.” The term “aspect” will serve to emphasize that the kinds are exhibited by, and (indirectly) extracted from, the objects of our pre-theoretical experience. The term “science” will mean any specific discipline, delimited by one or more aspects, in which theories are constructed. The list above should not be understood as a dogmatic pronouncement about whether these aspects are all genuine, since there are thinkers who would offer a somewhat different list. Rather, it is intended, first, as a description of (not a theory about) the way we come to experience properties of things in isolation as well as in their connectedness in objects. And second, it is a report of the list of aspects most thinkers have regarded as genuine fields for investigation and theory making - though everyone works with some list or other. The list, then, is only intended to help us understand the major branches of present-day theory making, not to arrive at the one true list of genuine aspects of the world. So from now on when I use such expressions as “aspects of things,” or “aspects of the world,” or “aspects of our experience,” these expressions must be understood to refer to aspects in the same way the list does.

The key idea in Dooyeweerd's ontology's the way any interpretation of the nature of reality is regulated by one or another divinity belief, where "divinity" means anything regarded as the self-existent reality all else depends on.

== Publications ==
- The Myth of Religious Neutrality (University of Notre Dame Press, Notre Dame, 1991, 2005).
- Knowing with the Heart (IVP, Downers Grove, 1999; Wipf & Stock, 2007).

This work shows that the biblical idea of faith is equivalent to n experience of self-evidence.
