= Philosophia Reformata =

- Discipline: Philosophy
- Language: English
- Edited by: Gerrit Glas

Publication details
- History: 1935–present
- Publisher: Brill Publishers
- Frequency: Biannually

Standard abbreviations
- ISO 4: Philos. Reformata

Indexing
- ISSN: 0031-8035 (print); 2352-8230 (web)

Links
- Journal homepage

Philosophia Reformata is a biannual peer-reviewed academic journal of the Association for Reformational Philosophy, which was founded in 1935. Formerly published by the Association, as of 2015 the journal is published by Brill Publishers. In 2026, the editor-in-chief is Gerrit Glas (Vrije Universiteit Amsterdam).

The book, Philosophia Reformata, was written by Johann Daniel Mylius and published in 1622 by the publisher, Jennis.

== History ==
The journal was first published by the Association for Reformational Philosophy in 1936. The journal's founding members were Herman Dooyeweerd and Dirk Vollenhoven.

The journal has its historical and intellectual background in the neo-Calvinist movement that gained momentum through the work of the 19th-century Dutch theologian, politician, university founder and publicist Abraham Kuyper. One basic idea in this movement, reflected in the journal, is that all human activity, including theoretical endeavor, is shaped by supratheoretical religious motivations (whether implicitly or explicitly, conscious or unconscious). A corollary idea is that Christian belief can consciously and consistently guide philosophical and other theoretical work. For example, neocalvinists hold that the idea of creation by God entails a firm distinction between Creator and creature, and that various kinds of (Divinely established) laws govern reality, and this requires a non-reductionistic theoretical account of the created order.
