= Neo-Calvinism =

Theological movement started in the late-19th century

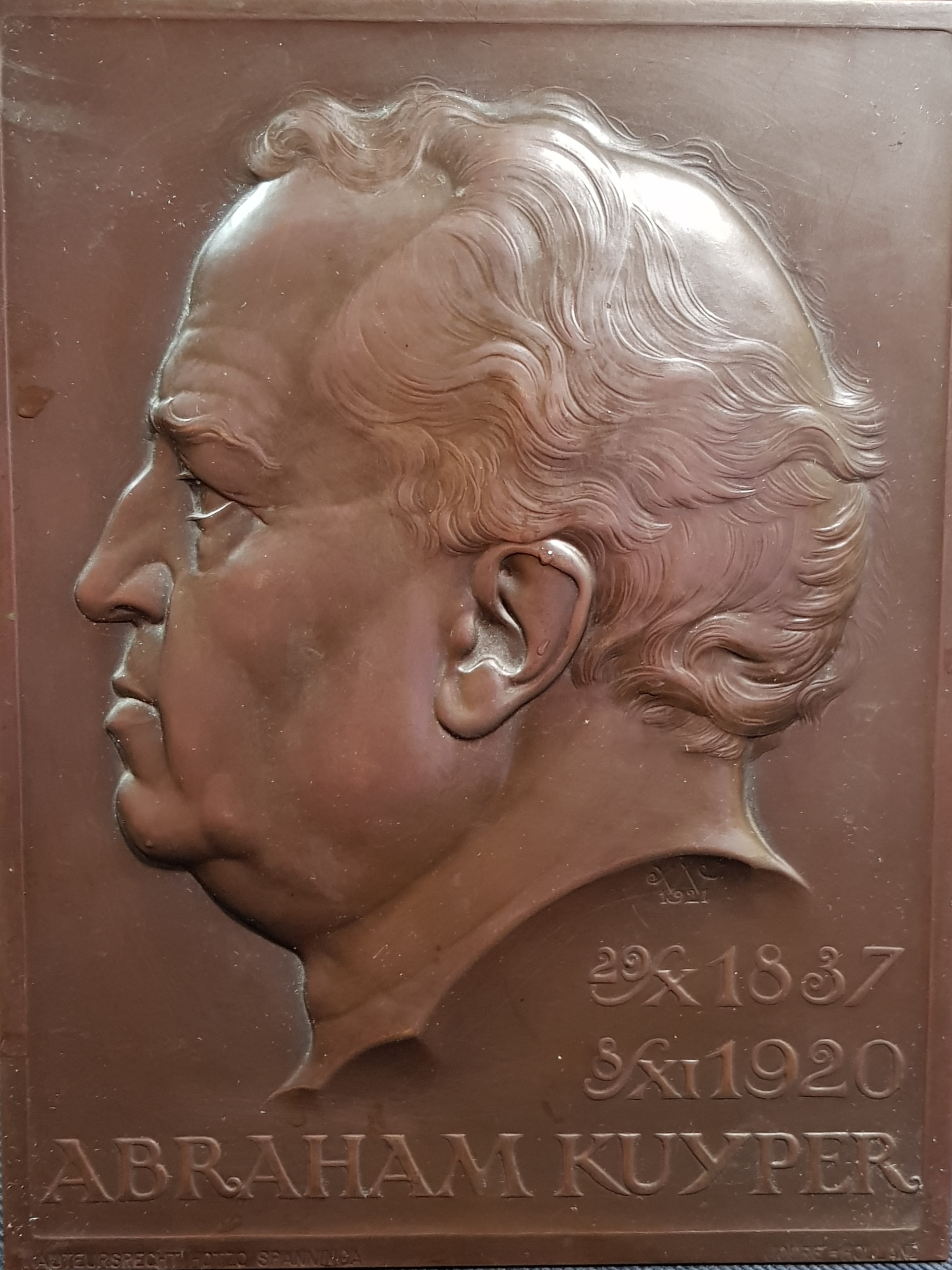
Abraham Kuyper

Neo-Calvinism is a Reformed theological movement that was initiated in the late-19th century in the Netherlands. It was originally developed by theologians Abraham Kuyper, a former Dutch prime minister, and Herman Bavinck who insisted on holding fast to historic Calvinistic thinking, but with a willingness to actively engage in every new context offered by a modern and pluralistic society. In this regard, Kuyper famously stated:

No single piece of our mental world is to be hermetically sealed off from the rest, and there is not a square inch in the whole domain of human existence over which Christ, who is sovereign over all, does not cry: 'Mine!'

While Neo-Calvinism originated in the Netherlands, it later found prominence in the United States, initially through Dutch immigrant theologians like Geerhardus Vos and Cornelius Van Til in the 20th century. It has since gained wider appeal in the United States and other countries, such as the United Kingdom and China.

== Theological themes ==
Neo-Calvinism has often focused on certain distinctive ways of theological thinking. However, as a theological movement, there is also debate as to how best to understand these topics.

=== Cultural mandate ===
The "cultural mandate" is the key Neo-Calvinist view on creation and culture. It was first proposed by Klaas Schilder and is often considered synonymous with Neo-Calvinism. Based on Genesis 1:26–28, God's command to rule and to subdue the earth is understood as a divine mandate to humanity to cultivate and to nurture all creation.

Abraham Kuyper understood creation as not just about "the beginning," but also its further potential. Therefore, humans are given a cultural mandate to be involved in appreciating creation and order within it, and aiding it to bring about God's glory. This means there is no division between that which is sacred or secular in this world. Humanity is mandated to be involved in the flourishing of all of creation.

Albert M. Wolters, who prefers describing this the "creation mandate," sees the mandate as having societal and cultural implications. It is centrally about human involvement in the development of civilization.

Some neo-Calvinists hold that the cultural mandate is as important as, and inseparable from the Great Commission.

=== Sphere sovereignty ===
Another key theme is the notion of sphere sovereignty (Soevereiniteit in eigen kring). Abraham Kuyper coined this idea arguing that each sphere (or sector) of life has its own distinct responsibilities and authority as designed by God, and no one area of life is sovereign over another. Examples of this include communities dedicated to worship, civil justice, agriculture, family, etc. Moreover, Kuyper envisioned the state as the "sphere of spheres," which ensures spheres are bounded by laws.

=== Common grace ===
God providentially sustains the created order, restraining of possible evils and giving non-salvific good gifts to all humanity despite their fall into sin, God's curse, and his eventual condemnation of the unredeemed.

=== The antithesis ===
There is a struggle in history and within every person – between submission to and rebellion against God; between the kingdom of light and the kingdom of darkness; between the age to come (already inaugurated in Christ) and this present evil age (of sin).
