= Christian philosophy =

Philosophy carried out by Christians

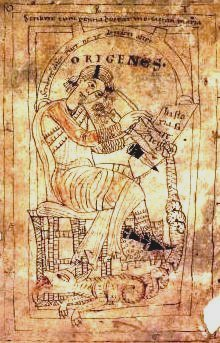
Origen, a Christian philosopher, as depicted c. 1160

Christian philosophy encompasses the philosophical ideas and systems developed by Christians or in direct relation to the religion of Christianity. Christian philosophy emerged with the aim of reconciling science, reason, and faith, starting from natural rational explanations with the help of Christian revelation. Several early thinkers such as Origen and Augustine of Hippo believed that there was a harmonious relationship between science and faith, others such as Tertullian claimed that there was contradiction, while others tried to differentiate them.

From a Catholic perspective, the relationship between faith and reason has been formally articulated in magisterial documents such as Pope John Paul II's 1998 encyclical Fides et ratio (Faith and Reason), which famously describes faith and reason as "two wings on which the human spirit rises to the contemplation of truth." The Catholic Church does not endorse a single official "Catholic philosophy," but it maintains that human reason can attain truths about God and morality. The Church often points to the work of Thomas Aquinas as an exemplar of the synthesis of philosophical inquiry and theological truth, an approach heavily emphasized in Pope Leo XIII's 1879 encyclical Aeterni Patris.

Some scholars question the existence of a distinct Christian philosophy, claiming that there is no originality in Christian thought, and that its concepts and ideas are inherited from Greek philosophy. Under this view, Christian philosophy simply protects or adopts philosophical thought that was already definitively elaborated by the Greeks. However, Catholic scholars such as Philotheus Boehner and Étienne Gilson argue that Christian philosophy is not a simple repetition of ancient philosophy. Although they acknowledge that Christian thinkers owe much to the knowledge developed by Plato, Aristotle, and the Neoplatonists, they claim that in Christian philosophy, Greek culture survives in a newly organic and transformed form.

== Historical aspects ==
Christian philosophy began around the 3rd century through the movement of the Christian community called Patristics, which initially had the defense of Christianity as its main objective. As Early Christianity spread, patristic authors increasingly engaged with the philosophical schools of the hellenized Roman Empire. Ultimately, they utilized aspects of these surrounding ideas to better articulate Christianity's own revelation of Jesus Christ as God incarnate and one with God the Father and God the Spirit. Many scholars consider Origen to be the first Christian teacher to fully present Christian philosophy and metaphysics as a robust alternative to other schools (especially Platonism). Origen Against Plato by Mark J. Edwards and the introduction to Origen: On First Principles by John Behr are two prominent examples exploring the history of a specifically Christian philosophy and metaphysics.

From the 11th century onwards, Christian philosophy manifested primarily through Scholasticism. This was the period of medieval philosophy that extended until the 15th century, as pointed out by scholar T. Adão Lara. From the 16th century onwards, Christian philosophy started to coexist alongside increasingly independent secular scientific and philosophical theories.

The development of Christian ideas represents a break with the philosophy of the Greeks, bearing in mind that the fundamental starting point of Christian philosophy is the Christian religious message. Lara divides Christian philosophy into three eras:

- Early philosophy: Patristics (2nd–7th centuries)
- Medieval philosophy: Scholastics (9th–13th centuries)
- Pre-modern philosophy (14th–15th centuries)

== Characteristics ==
=== Natural demonstration ===
The philosophical starting point of Christian philosophy is logic, not excluding Christian theology. Although there is a relationship between theological doctrines and philosophical reflection in Christian philosophy, its reflections are strictly rational. On this way of seeing the two disciplines, if at least one of the premises of an argument is derived from revelation, the argument falls in the domain of theology; otherwise it falls into philosophy's domain. Catholic teaching strongly upholds that human reason, by its own natural light, can arrive at certain truths, such as the existence of God, independent of divine revelation—a principle formally declared at the First Vatican Council.

=== Justification of truths of faith ===
Fundamentally, Christian philosophical ideals strive to make religious convictions rationally evident through natural reason. The Christian philosopher's attitude is determined by faith in matters relating to cosmology and everyday life. Unlike secular philosophers, Christian philosophers seek conditions for the identification of eternal truth, being characterized by religiosity. In the Catholic tradition, philosophy is often seen as the ancilla theologiae (handmaid of theology). This means that while philosophy is an autonomous discipline with its own methods, it can serve to clarify, defend, and further articulate theological truths.

There is criticism of Christian philosophy based on the fact that during the Middle Ages, the Christian religion was hegemonic and centralized the elaboration of all values. The coexistence of philosophy and religion is sometimes questioned, as philosophy itself is critical while religion is founded on revelation and established dogmas. Lara observes that there was questioning and writings with distinct philosophical characteristics in the Middle Ages, although religion and theology predominated. The establishment of dogmas did not prevent significant philosophical constructions from being elaborated.

=== Tradition ===
Christian philosophy developed from predecessor philosophies. Justin Martyr based his thought on Greek philosophy, which was subsequently utilized by Augustine and other Patristic writers. It was also shaped by the tradition of Jewish thought inherited from the Old Testament, and fundamentally by the Gospel message advocated by Christianity.

Scholasticism also received influence from both Jewish philosophy and Islamic philosophy. Christian Europe did not develop exclusively in isolation, but absorbed strong philosophical influences from other cultures and traditions.

=== Systematizing view ===
Christian philosophy attempts to systematically and comprehensively understand the problems of reality within a coherent whole. The overall vision provided by Christian revelation offers the Christian philosopher a comprehensive framework to interpret the world. For instance, the scholastic syntheses of thinkers like Thomas Aquinas aimed to build a complete architectural structure of knowledge, harmonizing Aristotelian logic and metaphysics with Christian revelation.

== See also ==
- Arguments for the existence of God
- Biblical studies
- Byzantine philosophy
- Christian apologetics
- Christian humanism
- Catholic theology
- Ethics in the Bible
- Judeo-Christian ethics
- Theism
- Thomism
