= D. H. Th. Vollenhoven =

Dutch philosopher (1892–1978)

D. H. Th. Vollenhoven

Dirk Hendrik Theodoor Vollenhoven (1 November 1892, in Amsterdam – 6 June 1978, Amsterdam) was a Dutch philosopher.

== Life history and early work ==
Vollenhoven was born in Amsterdam, son of Dirk Hendrik Vollenhoven and Catharina Pruijs. His father was a custom house officer of telegraphy in Amsterdam. In 1911, Vollenhoven registered in two faculties at the Vrije Universiteit in Amsterdam, the Faculty of Theology and the Faculty of Arts and Philosophy and obtained his PhD in philosophy (cum laude) in 1918. He was a pastor of the Reformed Churches, first in Oostkapelle, 1918-1921, then in The Hague, 1921-1926. He was appointed professor of philosophy at the Vrije Universiteit in 1926, and retired in 1963. On 10 October 1918 he married Hermina Maria Dooyeweerd (1892-1973). They had five children, two girls and three boys.

Vollenhoven was a person who combined direct clarity with deep insight. He had an analytical mind that mastered many distinctions. He was pious, modest, obliging, and dedicated in his many tasks. In the faculty of Arts and Philosophy he gave, from 1926 till 1954, all the courses in philosophy: history of philosophy, general systematic philosophy, logic, and theoretical psychology (the latter was considered to be a philosophical discipline at the time), and also the mandatory introduction to philosophy for first-year students of all the faculties. While preparing his dissertation on the influence of philosophy on mathematics and the natural sciences, Vollenhoven preached practically every Sunday, thereby becoming a well-known figure in the Reformed Churches. A year before gaining his PhD both his father and his supervisor and tutor, Jan Woltjer, died. G.H.J.W.J. Geesink stepped in to supervise the completion of the thesis (now with restricted topic), entitled: “The philosophy of mathematics from a theistic standpoint.” The Amsterdam mathematician, Gerrit Mannoury, whom Vollenhoven had critically described as being “the most consequential formalist and communistic pragmatist,” responded sympathetically to the dissertation by saying that Vollenhoven had taken a path “that had not been blazed by anyone before,” and that he did this “neither as theologian nor as mathematician, but as one who cherished his faith, yet without despising thought.”

In the parsonage in Oostkapelle, and later in The Hague, Vollenhoven performed his duties conscientiously, but he also continued his study of philosophy. In 1920 he received a scholarship and leave of absence to study psychology under Felix Krueger for five months in Leipzig. In the early 1920s neo-Kantianism was the dominant school in the Netherlands. In philosophy Vollenhoven sought the reconciliation of thought and being, mediated theistically, with the priority given to being. In about mid-1922 this was radicalized: knowing (and thought) is a part of being. Neo-Kantianism, contrariwise, took its departure from thought and justified this in humanistic fashion. In other words, Vollenhoven rowed against the main current of his time. His many commitments and interests led to his becoming overworked. In (mid-)January 1923 he suffered a mental collapse, the recuperation took up most of that year.

== Vollenhoven and Dooyeweerd ==
In the meantime Vollenhoven's brother-in-law, chess mate, and former study chum Herman Dooyeweerd became active in philosophy. He visited Vollenhoven in Oostkapelle to discuss how he might work his way into philosophy more methodically. When both lived in The Hague, their discussions became more intense and searching, and an enduring partnership in philosophy developed that lasted a life-time. Yet their personalities were very different: Vollenhoven, with his analytical disposition, was the organizer, systematic thinker, and man of detailed historical overviews; Dooyeweerd, with his musical talent (he was a fine pianist), was a jurist by training, who sought the grand design. Vollenhoven had worked his way into the problems of mathematics, the natural sciences, biology, psychology, epistemology, and theology, while Dooyeweerd had a good command of sociology, economics, and jurisprudence. From the end of 1923 on, both advanced a “reformed philosophy” (what they referred to as “Calvinistic philosophy,” now usually called Reformational philosophy). They were simultaneously appointed to university chairs at the Vrije Universiteit of Amsterdam in 1926, Dooyeweerd in the Juridical Faculty, Vollenhoven in the Faculty of Arts and Philosophy as the successor of Geesink.

As professor, Vollenhoven was exacting but also exploratory and eager to pursue new avenues. Towards his students he was pastorally mild and sympathetic, which won him popularity and respect. In 1929 he became president of the university's alumni organization and in 1930 an honorary member of the student fraternity. Also in 1930 the Calvinistic Student Movement (in Dutch: CSB) was formed, which often called on Vollenhoven for advice and invited him as speaker. From about this time more intense contact took place with Klaas Schilder. Schilder was a Reformed theologian, who played a dominant role in the split in the Reformed Churches in the Netherlands in 1944, a development much lamented by Vollenhoven.

== A new anthropology ==
After his illness in 1923, Vollenhoven began openly to criticize the dogma of the immortality of the soul. This was first initiated by A. Janse, a self-taught elementary school principal with whom Vollenhoven struck up a friendship. In “The first questions of psychology” (1929), a published lecture, Vollenhoven explained that the soul, as usually understood, is not an immortal substance but rather the psyche as a function of the human being, which operates within an aspect (or “law-sphere”) of reality. He took the soul itself to be the central unity of the heart of the human being. Vollenhoven had no enemies, but he did gain his first opponents in this connection among psychologists, in particular Jan Waterink, who defended the distinct reality of body, soul, and spirit.

The syllabus for the introductory course to philosophy, entitled Isagôgè Philosophiae (1930), was the first document to summarize the new “Reformational philosophy.” (Vollenhoven always referred to it as “Calvinistic philosophy,” a term he first used in his inaugural address of 1926.) It attracted many and led to the formation of a distinct school in philosophy. In his Vice-Chancellor's oration, given during his term (1932-1933) as Vice-Chancellor of the university, he discussed “The necessity of a Christian logic.” Vollenhoven criticized the so-called “neutrality” of logic. The latter uses logic as mere instrument of analysis, guided by the epistemological subject, rather than viewing logic as contributing substantively to the understanding through its principles. When shortly afterwards Vollenhoven's book appeared, Calvinism and the Reformation of Philosophy (1933), this clarified his program, but it also elicited criticism (from H. H. Kuyper, V. Hepp), especially regarding Vollenhoven's opposition to scholasticism. In response Vollenhoven displayed perseverance without becoming polemical: “We must not seek conflict but work constructively.”

While Vollenhoven and Dooyeweerd worked in close cooperation, each retained his independence. Dooyeweerd defended Reformational philosophy from the standpoint of a transcendental critique. This critique sought to expose the dependence of thought, particularly theoretical thought, on religion. Vollenhoven was keener on setting out the viable religious presuppositions of any understanding of reality.

== A unique ontology ==
For example, in ontology Vollenhoven opposed the notion of a concept of being that encompasses God, cosmos, and the human being. Vollenhoven's primary distinction was that of the Trinity, who is, the law for the cosmos that holds, and the created cosmos, which is entirely sustained by God. In connection with the cosmos, different fundamental aspects (“law-spheres”) are distinguished—fifteen of which have been made explicit—in which creatures function. As to the human being, outwardly its functions are “structured throughout,” inwardly there is the direction-determining soul or heart, “out of which are the issues of life.” The law, which in a generic sense forms a boundary limit for created reality, involves a three-fold specification: (i) there is the creation command (the “let there be …” of Genesis 1) relevant to “the origination, structure, whereby is implicit its modal diversity [of law-spheres], and the internal development of each kingdom”; (ii) the love command, which “concerns the [moral] direction of human life in its relation to God and fellow human being”; and (iii) the positive laws, which “bridge the love command and the concrete situation” in need of regulation “in light of society’s purpose, historical phase, and geographical location.”

Since “knowing is a part of being,” the theory of knowledge presupposes ontology, hence analysis needs to proceed from created reality and respect its being law-bound. Theology, in turn, is dependent on revelation, rather than on logically drawn conclusions about the being of God. The latter procedure ignores the boundary that defines our human limitation.

== On the history of philosophy ==
As to the history of philosophy, Vollenhoven concentrated on developing a problem-historical method. A philosopher finds himself in a network of relations with his contemporaries and predecessors. This is reflected in his philosophical position, on the one hand in how he deals with current problems of his time and attempts to supersede them, on the other hand in evidencing preference for how a specific tradition of thought treats the problems that recur in all thought. The discussion of current problems is usually conducted in terms of a uniformity of style, focusing on those features that are taken to be normative or involving a view of truth or of law that is deemed fitting for such contemporary discussions. Seen from a greater range of time, the distinct styles of what were contemporary approaches give rise to historically distinct periods, in temporal succession, that Vollenhoven refers to as “time-currents” in philosophy (e.g., Hellenism, Neoplatonism, Waning Middle Ages, the Age of Enlightenment, Positivism, Existentialism, Postmodernism). On the other hand, the treatment of recurring problems centers on ontology and its influence on the variety of views concerning the world (or the cosmos, which may include the world of the gods, such as in Gnosticism) and concerning anthropology, often seen as reflecting the structure of the world. Vollenhoven finds that the ontologies that predominate in cosmology and anthropology are either monistic or dualistic, each kind giving rise to a variety of traditional “types of ontology” (e.g., Priority theory, Interactionism, Parallelism, Platonizing or Aristotelian hylomorphism). In summary any philosopher's position can be situated in the crossing of a time-current and a type of ontology, which at the same time brings together and characterizes the philosophical conception of problems relevant for that position. The overall aim of the problem-historical method is to make visible the lay-out of currents and types, and thereby the basic problems of thought throughout the whole history of philosophy, from Hesiod to Martin Heidegger.

Vollenhoven hoped to publish a multi-volume history of philosophy, in cooperation with two of his former students, S. U. Zuidema and K. J. Popma. Many course notes had become syllabi between 1926 and 1948. In 1950 the first volume of the History of Philosophy appeared, covering the period of ancient philosophy prior to Plato and Aristotle. At first the work was well received. But despite its 600 pages, the book remained a grand torso. Several philosophers convened (H.J. Pos, Willem Jacob Verdenius, D. Loenen, Ms. C.J. de Vogel) to respond and together they aggressively criticized the book, particularly seizing on its ontological take-off point and problem-historical method. They also successfully advised against the federal funding of the second volume of this project. Vollenhoven was forced to seek other means. He was able to publish his problem-historical results in the philosophy articles he wrote for the Oosthoek encyclopedia, in its 4th and 5th editions.

== An association and opponents ==
In 1935 Vollenhoven founded the “Association for Calvinistic Philosophy,” with Philosophia Reformata as its academic journal, Mededelingen to report its internal affairs, and Correspondentiebladen for exploratory discussions. Vollenhoven, who was the chairperson, opened the first meeting with the words: “[What] brings us together here is something glorious. It is not philosophy, for that is not what comes first in our lives. Rather it is the bond to God’s Word, for by grace we have learned to desire to live solely through Christ, [hence] religion, as concern of the heart, has become the center of our whole existence.” Of philosophy, as then current, Vollenhoven said: “[It] knows nothing of a God as understood in the Scriptures; nothing of a heart that can only find rest in Him; nothing of world history, which lies anchored in the first and second Adam; also very little of the difference between life terrains, the distinction of which appears so necessary in daily life.”

On 18 November 1938 the curators of the Vrije Universiteit received a formal complaint from the theological faculty (H. H. Kuyper, V. Hepp, J. Waterink, G. Ch. Aalders, also F. W. Grosheide, and even D. Nauta, but not C. van Gelderen), charging Vollenhoven with departing from the Reformed confession, on two counts: (i) the denial of “the duality of human existence, namely as a material, mortal body and as a immaterial, immortal soul;” (ii) the denial that the Son of God had “an impersonal human nature”—the view of the Son of God having a “personal” human nature, as held by Vollenhoven, was considered to be “an error reminding one of Nestorius.” The first point is confused. Vollenhoven never denied the distinction of body and soul; what he denied was the view that is popular in the Protestant scholastic tradition concerning this distinction. A separate committee was formed to look into the matter. But World War II intervened, and the matter was dropped. The second point is based on a passage in Vollenhoven's Calvinism and the Reformation of Philosophy, which is vague and thus capable of being read as “Nestorian.” Prior to the charge, Vollenhoven had already openly regretted his formulation and promised to revise it, should a second edition of the book appear. He himself had no Nestorian leanings. Vollenhoven also argued that the expression “impersonal human nature” does not occur in the main confessions of the church in connection with Christology. So to consider the denial of this to be heresy is actually out of order. But the theological faculty, seeing its scholasticism threatened, sought to undercut Vollenhoven's popularity and growing influence and used the concern for the confession to that end. He was forced to publicly recant his “error” and give a full explanation in a published article. To date, the university has not exonerated (the memory of) Vollenhoven of blame and its treatment of him.

== Further organizational work ==
Following World War II, Vollenhoven put into operation the initiative to designate specific chairs for the promotion of Reformational philosophy at public universities in the Netherlands by providing for capital and an organizational base, and also by appointing suitable persons to carry this out. Vollenhoven was now well-known. During the war he had become the chairman of the Algemeene Nederlandsche Vereeniging voor Wijsbegeerte [General Dutch Association for Philosophy]. He remained in office until the 10th World Congress of Philosophy had taken place in Amsterdam in August 1948. In 1947 the Foundation for Special Chairs in Calvinistic Philosophy came into existence, with Vollenhoven as chairman. Among the persons appointed to chairs, some were former students of Vollenhoven. At the Vrije Universiteit itself, S. U. Zuidema was appointed, in part to relieve Vollenhoven of the introduction to philosophy course, which, with the growth of the student population after the War, had become quite demanding. He could now apply himself almost entirely to the history of philosophy. He chose to remain the chairperson of the Association for Calvinistic Philosophy till 1963, the year that he retired.

== International influence ==
Vollenhoven had followers in North America and South Africa. In North America, H.E. Runner, who had done post-graduate work under Vollenhoven, took the initiative of setting up “The Association for Reformed Scientific Studies,” which in 1967 opened the doors of the Institute for Christian Studies in Toronto. In South Africa, Hendrik G. Stoker and J.A.L. Taljaard together cooperated with Vollenhoven and Dooyeweerd in encouraging students to do post-graduate work at the Vrije Universiteit. In 1961 Vollenhoven gave numerous lectures in North America and two years later he lectured extensively in South Africa.

Upon retiring in 1963, Vollenhoven was succeeded by four persons: Hendrik van Riessen, J. van der Hoeven, A.W. Begemann, and C.A. van Peursen. Van Riessen also succeeded Vollenhoven as chairperson of the “Association for Calvinistic Philosophy” (later “Calvinistic” gave way to “Reformational,” still later to “Christian”). After giving his valedictory address on “Plato’s realism,” Vollenhoven continued to give private monthly lectures to specialists in his problem-historical work. Vollenhoven died at the age of 85, having been a widower for the last five-and-a-half years of his life.

== Further literature ==
- K.A. Bril, Vollenhoven’s Problem-Historical Method. Introduction and Explanations, trans. and augmented by R.W. Vunderink (Sioux Center, Iowa: Dordt College Press, 2005).
- J.H. Kok, Vollenhoven His Early Development (Sioux Center, Iowa: Dordt College Press, 1992).
- J.H. Kok, Patterns of the Western Mind. A Reformed Christian Perspective, 2nd revised ed. (Sioux Center, Iowa: Dordt College Press, 1998).
- J. Stellingwerff, De Vrije Universiteit na Kuyper (Kampen: Kok, 1987 [should be 1990]).
- A. Tol, Philosophy in the Making. D.H.Th. Vollenhoven and the Emergence of Reformed Philosophy (Sioux Center, Iowa: Dordt College Press, 2010).
- A. Tol, “Reformational philosophy in the making,” Philosophia Reformata 76 (2011), pp. 187–215.
- D.H.Th. Vollenhoven, Isagôgè Philosophiae / Introduction to Philosophy, ed. by John H. Kok and Anthony Tol, trans. by John H. Kok, with a Preface by Calvin Seerveld and a Foreword by Anthony Tol (Sioux Center, Iowa: Dordt College Press, 2005). (Bilingual Dutch-English edition; also separate English edition.)
- D.H.Th. Vollenhoven, The Problem-Historical Method and the History of Philosophy, ed. by K.A. Bril, trans. by J. de Kievit, S. Francke, J.G. Friesen, and R. Sweetman (Amstelveen: De Zaak Haes, 2005).
- D.H.Th. Vollenhoven, Isagôgè Philosophiae 1930-1945 Tekst-kritische uitgave. Filosofie in de Traditie van de Reformatie, ed. by A. Tol (Amsterdam: Free University Press, 2010). (This text-critical edition is in Dutch.)
- B.J. van der Walt, “A new paradigm for doing Christian philosophy: D.H.Th. Vollenhoven (1892-1978),” chap. 5 of At Home in God’s World. A transforming paradigm for being human and for social involvement (Potchefstroom: The Institute for Contemporary Christianity in Africa, 2010), pp. 152–182.
- B.J. van der Walt, “The human heart rediscovered in the anthropology of D.H.Th. Vollenhoven,” chap. 9 of op. cit., pp. 290–324.
