= Herman Dooyeweerd =

Dutch Neo-Calvinist philosopher

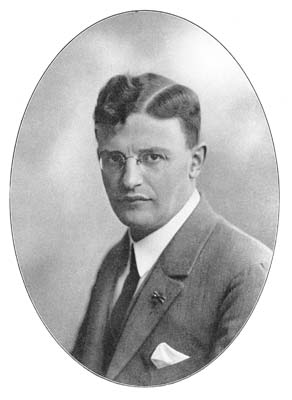
- Dooyeweerd, c. 1930
- Born: 7 November 1894; Amsterdam, Netherlands
- Died: 12 February 1977 (aged 82); Amsterdam, Netherlands

Philosophical work
- Era: 20th-century philosophy
- Region: Western philosophy
- School: Reformational philosophy, Continental philosophy, Neo-Calvinism
- Notable ideas: Modal aspects, Meaning-oriented philosophy, Religious ground motive

Herman Dooyeweerd, also spelled Herman Dooijeweerd (7 October 1894, Amsterdam – 12 February 1977, Amsterdam), was a professor of law and jurisprudence at the Vrije Universiteit, Amsterdam from 1926 to 1965. He was also a philosopher and principal founder of Reformational philosophy (Note: Several names for Dooyeweerd's system have appeared over the last few decades. His original De Wijsbegeerte der Wetsidee (3 vols., Amsterdam: H.J. Paris, 1935–6) translates as "The Philosophy of the Law-Idea". However, Dooyeweerd wrote in his later New Critique of Theoretical Thought that the "best English term corresponding to it seems to be ‘cosmonomic Idea’, since the word ‘law’ used without further specification would evoke a special juridical sense which, of course, cannot be meant here" (NC I, 93). While this phrase has been popular among Dooyeweerd scholars, some have also used the phrase "law framework philosophy", such as Roy Clouser and Adolfo García de la Sienra Guajardo.) (with his brother-in-law Dirk Vollenhoven), (Note: While many Dooyeweerd scholars believe Dooyeweerd's thought to be compatible with that of Vollenhoven, others have cast doubt on such a view.) a significant development within the Neo-Calvinist (or Kuyperian) school of thought. Dooyeweerd made several contributions to philosophy and other academic disciplines concerning: the nature of diversity and coherence in everyday experience; the transcendental conditions for theoretical thought; the relationship between religion, philosophy, and scientific theory; and an understanding of meaning, being, time and self.

Dooyeweerd is most famous for his suite of fifteen aspects (or 'modalities', 'modal aspects', or 'modal law-spheres') of reality. These are distinct ways in which reality exists, has meaning, is experienced, and occurs. This suite of aspects is finding application in practical analysis, research and teaching in such diverse fields as built environment, sustainability, agriculture, business, information systems and development.

== Dooyeweerd’s critiques of philosophy ==
Dooyeweerd made both immanent and transcendental critiques of Western philosophy, following the traditions of Continental philosophy.

In his immanent critique, he sought to understand each philosophic thinker's work or each tradition from the inside, and uncover, in its own terms, its basic presuppositions, to reveal deep problems. By such immanent critique of philosophic thinkers from the pre-Socratic Greeks onwards through to the middle of the twentieth century (including mediaeval period, into the modern periods), Dooyeweerd claimed to have demonstrated that theoretical thinking has always been based on presuppositions of a religious nature, which he called ground motives. A ground motive is a spiritual driving force that impels each thinker to interpret reality under its influence. Dooyeweerd identified four major ground-motives of Western thought, three of them dualistic in nature:

1. the Form-Matter divide of Greek thought
2. the Creation-Fall-Redemption motive of Biblical (Hebrew, Semitic) thought
3. the Nature-Grace divide of mediaeval, Scholastic thought
4. the Nature-Freedom divide of humanistic, Enlightenment thought

This means that theoretical thought has never been neutral or autonomous of the thinker.

However, Dooyeweerd remained unsatisfied "with an argument that shows that in fact philosophy always has been influenced by religious convictions". Rather, he "wants to show that it cannot be otherwise, because it is part of the nature of philosophy or theoretical thought."

This led Dooyeweerd to undertake a transcendental critique of theoretical thought, of the kind Immanuel Kant pioneered. Whereas Kant and Husserl sought the conditions that make theoretical thinking possible, they still presupposed that a theoretical attitude is possible. Dooyeweerd sought to understand the conditions that make a theoretical attitude possible, and argued that all theoretical thought takes place with reference to an "Origin of Meaning", which is a ground-motive to which we adhere extra-rationally. This means that theoretical thought never can be neutral or autonomous of the thinker.

From this, Dooyeweerd argued that all "good" philosophy addresses three fundamental parts to an idea:

1. world
2. coherence of rationalities
3. origin of meaning

This, he proposed, can enable disparate theoretical and philosophical approaches to enter into discourse with each other, as long as each thinker openly admits their own ground-motive. Dooyeweerd, accordingly, made very explicit his own grounding in Creation-Fall-Redemption, with a Neo-Calvinist flavour and a debt to Abraham Kuyper.

== Dooyeweerd's cosmonomic philosophy ==
Dooyeweerd's cosmonomic philosophy is different from most extant philosophy in at least three ways, which intertwine:

First, it takes seriously the pre-theoretical attitude of thought, as a starting point from which to begin to understand what makes theoretical thought possible. Most other philosophical thinking begins by presupposing a theoretical attitude and either ignores everyday experience or attempts to explain it theoretically, either way presupposing the possibility of theoretical thought as a way to knowledge. In making the possibility of theoretical thought a philosophical problem to address, Dooyeweerd went deeper and further than Kant, Husserl and Heidegger and others.^{(too rhetorical of a statement)}

Second, it is rooted in different presuppositions ('ground motives') about the nature of reality, which are religious in nature. Whereas Greek philosophy is rooted in the Form/Matter divide, Scholastic thinking of medieval Christianity in the Nature/Grace divide, and Humanistic philosophy in the Nature/Freedom divide, Dooyeweerd began from the biblical idea of Creation, Fall and Redemption. He may be said to have explored the philosophical (rather than theological) implications of this idea. He called his philosophy 'Christian philosophy', though what usually claims that label is of a Scholastic nature and very different.

Third, it posits that Meaning is more fundamental than Being or Process. Dooyeweerd expressed it:

Meaning is the being of all that has been created and the nature even of our selfhood. It has a religious root and a divine origin.

Meaningfulness originates from the Creator (God) rather than from sovereign human attribution. All things, not just those linked with humanity, are meaningful. Strictly, Dooyeweerd says, things are, rather than have, meaning. Thus, meaning is like an ocean in which we swim, an enabler of all our existence and functioning, rather than a property we attribute to things or words.

=== Diversity of science ===
This has implications for science. Science – whether mathematical, natural, human or social sciences - is seen as the abstracting of certain aspects for study. For example, even though a lawyer and a biologist might study the same things – for example, fingerprints – they are interested in different aspects. They are looking at the meaning of a thing with different focus, though equally concerned with what is real. Perceptions of reality through this kind of scientific attitude, selecting one aspect as distinct from others for study, will necessarily be governed by fundamental assumptions about how these various kinds of meaning are related to one another in a coherent whole, belonging within the total range of all experiences.

Likewise, in everyday life, we can be aware of distinct aspects, though most of the time we function in them tacitly.

=== Aspects ===
The positing of meaning as fundamental, and the priority given to our pre-theoretical experience of diverse meaning, prompts the thinker to ask, "what ways are there of being meaningful, which cannot be reduced to each other?" Or, in other words, what different aspects are there of things? He delineated fifteen, which are not mere categories, but modalities (ways of being, functioning, etc):

- Quantitative aspect: amount
- Spatial aspect: continuous extension
- Kinematic aspect: flowing movement
- Physical aspect: energy, matter
- Biotic/Organic aspect: life functions, self-maintenance
- Sensitive/Psychic aspect: feeling and response
- Analytical aspect: distinction, conceptualization
- Formative aspect: formative power, achievement, technology, technique
- Lingual aspect: symbolic communication
- Social aspect: social interaction
- Economic aspect: frugal use of resources
- Aesthetic aspect: harmony, surprise, fun
- Juridical aspect: due (rights, responsibility)
- Ethical aspect: self-giving love
- Pistic aspect: faith, vision, commitment, belief

Dooyeweerd claimed that since the discovery of these is addressed by our theoretical functioning, which is fallible, no suite of aspects, including his own, can "lay claim to material completion".

=== Implications of the aspects ===
Briefly, aspects are ways of being meaningful and are the 'law side' of created reality. All that occurs does so by 'answering to' the laws of each aspect (i.e. being subject to their laws). e.g. physical waves or particles occur by the laws of the physical aspect, poetry occurs by the laws of the aesthetic aspect. Thus, each aspect or 'law sphere' may be seen as defining a distinct kind of possibility.

Earlier aspects are determinative; later ones are normative. Human beings function as subject in or to all aspects, animals as subject up to the sensitive aspect, plants up to the biotic, and non-living things up to the physical. As you are reading this, you are functioning lingually by understanding it, analytically by conceptualizing, sensitively by seeing or hearing, etc. In fact, all our functioning is multi-aspectual, though some aspects might be latent.

Things exist by reference to each aspect. For example, a car exists physically as a load of steel, plastic, etc., kinematically as a mode of transport, socially as a status symbol, economically as a dent in our finances, aesthetically as a thing of beauty, biotically as a polluter, pistically as an idol, and so on. The being of things is multi-aspectual in principle.

Knowledge may be seen as multi-aspectual knowing. For example, analytical knowing gives categories and theories, formative knowing gives skills, lingual knowing gives 'bodies of knowledge' as found in libraries, and so on.

Each aspect defines a different rationality. In this way, Dooyeweerd echoes Winch and Habermas, though with more precision.

== Works and legacy ==
Dooyeweerd attempted to provide a philosophy which accounted for not only the differences in non-human reality, but also, between one thinker and another. Following Abraham Kuyper, and other, earlier Neo-Calvinists, Dooyeweerd attempted to describe reality as a creation of God, which has its meaning from God. This God-given meaning is displayed in all of the aspects of temporal reality – which has implications for science.

For example, even though a lawyer and a biologist might study the same things – say, fingerprints – they are interested in different aspects. They are looking at the meaning of a thing with different focus, though equally concerned with what is real. Perceptions of reality through this kind of scientific attitude, selecting one aspect as distinct from others for study, will necessarily be governed by fundamental assumptions about how these various kinds of meaning are related to one another in a coherent whole, belonging within the total range of all experiences. Dooyeweerd argued that this showed the need for a consistent and radically Christian philosophy which he sought to provide. Furthermore, he attempted to show that even the imaginations of men are part of that same created reality, and even where misguided they cannot escape being subject to the rule of God exposed by the Christian revelation.

Although he self-consciously exposes the religious nature of his philosophy, Dooyeweerd suggests that in fact, all thought is inescapably religious in character. This religious stamp is disguised when the supposed origin of meaning, toward which various thinkers direct their thought, is not called God, but is rather said to be some aspect of creation. This, he suggests, explains why humanistic science will produce bitterly conflicting ideologies. It helps to locate the "antithesis", the source of irreducible differences, between various perspectives. The "antithesis" must be accounted for as a foundational issue, in any complete philosophy, and this antithesis is religious in nature, according to Dooyeweerd.

Borrowing language and concepts from a wide variety of philosophical schools, especially Edmund Husserl, the Marburg school of neo-Kantianism, Ernst Cassirer's Philosophy of Symbolic Forms—and, as some contend, Franz Xaver von Baader, (Note: It is the controversial contention of the Baader and Dooyeweerd scholar J. Glenn Friesen that Dooyeweerd's Calvinist philosophy is closely akin to and developed from the mystical Catholic philosophy of Von Baader. Accepting this premise would lead to a different interpretation of Dooyeweerd's thought than has hitherto prevailed.) Dooyeweerd builds on this foundation of a supposed "antithesis" to make distinctions between one kind of thinking and another, theorizing that diverse kinds of thinking disclose diverse kinds of meaning, and that this meaning corresponds in some way to the actual state of affairs.

Dooyeweerd developed an anti-reductionist ontology of "modal aspects", concerning diverse kinds of meaning which are disclosed in the analysis of every existent thing. He considered such modes to be irreducible to each other and yet indissolubly linked. Dooyeweerd at first suggested that there were 14 modes but later postulated 15. The indissoluble coherence of these modal aspects is evinced through their analogical relationship to one another, and finally in their concentration in the central religious selfhood which has a direct relationship to its origin: God.

The majority of Dooyeweerd's published articles and multi-volume works originally appeared only in Dutch. During his lifetime efforts were already underway to make his work available to English-speakers. Translation of Dooyeweerd's writing has continued since 1994 under the oversight of the Dooyeweerd Centre (see link below). To date, thirteen books have been published in English, including his magnum opus, De Wijsbegeerte der Wetsidee (1935–1936), which was revised and expanded in English as A New Critique of Theoretical Thought (1953–1958).

Dooyeweerd's influence has continued through the Association for Reformational Philosophy and its journal Philosophia Reformata which he and Vollenhoven founded in 1932. The title of the journal is something of an arcane philosophical joke, which repristinates and shifts the meaning of the title from a 1622 book, authored by Johann Daniel Mylius, Philosophia Reformata, a compendium of alchemy, then regarded by some as a science. There are also a number of institutions around the world that draw their inspiration from Dooyeweerd's philosophy. ^{(such as? - name at least some)}

Dooyeweerd became member of the Royal Netherlands Academy of Arts and Sciences in 1948.

In a commemoration editorial appearing in the newspaper Trouw on 6 October 1964 upon the occasion of Dooyeweerd's 70th birthday, G.E. Langemeijer, chairman of the Royal Dutch Academy of Sciences, professor at the University of Leiden, and appellate attorney general, lauded Dooyeweerd as "... the most original philosopher Holland has ever produced, even Spinoza not excepted."

=== Religious ground motive ===
A religious ground motive is a spiritual driving force that impels each thinker to interpret reality under its influence. Dooyeweerd wrote that, in the case of thinkers who presume that human thought is autonomous, who operate by the dictum that it does not matter whether God exists or not, such a thinker's basic commitment to autonomous thought forces him to pick out some aspect of the creation as the origin of all meaning. In doing so, the supposedly autonomous thinker is made captive to a kind of idol of his own making, which bends his understanding to conform to its dictates, according to Dooyeweerd.

Dooyeweerd self-consciously allowed his Christian perspective to guide his understanding, but in a philosophical rather than a theological mode of thought. He believed that this permitted the philosopher to gain insight into the principle by which diversity of meaning is held together as a unity, as he directs his thought toward the origin of things, which is God, and God's purpose for making things, which is found in Christ. This basic religious orientation should affect the way that the Christian understands things. In contrast to a dualistic type of religious ground motive, Dooyeweerd suggested that the Christian's basic orientation to the world ought to be derived not from human speculation, but from God's revealed purposes: Creation, the Fall into sin, and Redemption in Christ. This Christian religious ground motive is a fundamentally different posture toward things, compared to say, the "Form/Matter" scheme of the Greeks, the "Nature/Grace" synthesis of Medieval Christianity, or the "Nature/Freedom" approach of the Enlightenment, all of which are orientations divided against themselves by their reliance upon two contradictory principles. While the Christian religious view of things as Created, Fallen and being Redeemed has often been blended with speculative and dualistic schemes, it has never really become fully identified with them, so that there is historical continuity in Christian thought despite the fact that it has undergone numerous significant shifts, in Dooyeweerd's view. But the fact that they are capable of being blended convincingly exposes the transcendental rules to which both false and true theories are subject.

In his book Roots of Western Culture Dooyeweerd identified four great frameworks or value-systems that have determined human interpretations of reality with formative power over Western culture. Three of these are dualistic and may be described in the terms of Hegelian dialectic as antitheses of opposite poles of reference that are eventually resolved by synthesis, only for the synthesis to draw out, inexorably, a new opposing pole and so a new antithesis. Other RGMs may readily be added to Dooyeweerd's list, and this endeavour may be sanctioned by Dooyeweerd's own passing reference to a Zoroastrian RGM.

==== The Matter RGM of the Greeks ====
The Form/Matter framework for ontology was articulated by Greek philosophers, particularly Aristotle. However, Dooyeweerd identifies its roots in the ancient religious beliefs about a river of life and the rule of μοιρα fate, which came to be set against the later culture religion of the rule of the Olympian gods, in a logical antithesis. Nietzsche argues, similarly, that Greek philosophy from the time of Homer through to Plato and Aristotle demonstrates a tension between valorization of a Dionysian natural orgiastic devotion to the life force, celebrated in the annual Baccanal at Delphi, and the model of the city and its justice as achieved by calm thought in accord with an Apollonian devotion represented by the Temple of Athena. Perhaps the best articulation of this tension of values can be seen in the tragic drama where the Furies are constrained and given a place below the Temple's altar where they can no longer unleash themselves in the historic form of a blood revenge.

==== The Creation - Fall - Redemption RGM ====
Dooyeweerd's next RGM is not dualistic but ternary, described as Creation - Fall - Redemption: three moments of radical cosmic change. This RGM is argued to be authentically Judeo-Christian because it does not identify any parts or aspects of experienced reality that might be absolutised in place of God; rather, it shows the significance of the biblical metanarrative for a correct understanding of reality. Significantly, it is an understanding that can only be derived from special revelation. For much of the history of Christianity this RGM has not taken its legitimate prominence because of the way that Christianity was accommodated to Greek pagan philosophy in the writings of some of the Church Fathers such as Justin and Athenagoras. This facilitated a transition from the Form/Matter RGM to the Nature/Grace RGM. Dooyeweerd believed that the Protestant Reformation represented a re-discovery of the Creation - Fall - Redemption RGM and that he, with others such as Abraham Kuyper, was helping to restore it to its rightful place in Christian thinking, as the foundation for a Protestant Christian worldview and Christian philosophy.

==== Grace RGM of the Latin Middle Ages ====
According to Dooyeweerd, the authentic Creation - Fall - Redemption RGM of the New Testament writers largely failed to win its place in the development of Christian philosophy. Instead, a synthesis of the Form/Matter RGM took place, giving rise to a concept of natural earthly reality, and the Christian theological understanding of redemption was taken as the antithesis to this in the form of the concept of Grace. Thus arose the Nature/Grace antithesis, which was initially oriented with Grace as superior to Nature. The Nature/Grace RGM was powerfully developed in the philosophy of Thomas Aquinas and so persisted through the Renaissance of the 12th century, the Renaissance, and indeed through the Protestant Reformation and Catholic Counter-Reformation.

==== Freedom RGM of the Enlightenment ====
Eventually, with the decline in the Church's political dominance and the implicit dismissal of the earthly realm by the polarisation of the Nature/Grace RGM, this antithesis was secularised, leading to its replacement by a humanistic Nature/Freedom RGM. This may be understood by considering how Enlightenment thought may be aligned with each of two poles. One was the elevation of Nature, the deterministic universe of the natural philosophers; the other was the quest for absolute freedom, the ideal of Romanticism. Dooyeweerd saw how many modernist philosophers struggled to account for both sides of this dualistic RGM, retaining human freedom while construing the Universe as a kind of machine, but without finding a lasting solution.

The Nature/Grace RGM is the last in Dooyeweerd's survey, but he then moves on, in the final section of Roots of Western Culture, to a critique of Historicism. This worldview, abandoning absolutes and proposing a relativistic interpretation of culture, appears as an elevation of the Freedom motif above the Nature motif, and is in turn contested by the rise of modern sociology with its implicit bid for dominance on behalf of Nature. This brings the survey up to Dooyeweerd's time of writing, where he is ready to propose his new framework for Reformational philosophy founded on the Creation - Fall - Redemption RGM.

== Bibliography ==
=== Multi-volume publications ===
- Dooyeweerd, Herman (1997) [1955], A New Critique of Theoretical Thought, vol. I: The Necessary Presuppositions of Philosophy, Lewiston, New York: Edwin Mellen Press.
  - Volume II: The General Theory of the Modal Spheres
  - Volume III: The Structure of Individuality of Temporal Reality
  - Volume IV: Index of Subject and Authors (compiled by H. de Jongste)
- Reformation and Scholasticism in Philosophy
  - Volume I: The Greek Prelude
- Encyclopedia of the Science of Law
  - Volume 1: Introduction

=== Collected essays, critiques, and compilations ===
- Christian Philosophy and the Meaning of History
- Essays in Legal, Social, and Political Philosophy
- Roots of Western Culture
- In The Twilight of Western Thought
- Political Philosophy
- Contours of a Christian Philosophy; An Introduction to Herman Dooyeweerd's Thought

== Studies ==
- Chaplin, Jonathan (2011), Herman Dooyeweerd: Christian Philosopher of State and Civil Society, Notre Dame.
- Otto, Paul (2005), "In the twilight of Dooyeweerd's Corpus: The Publishing History of In the Twilight of Western Thought and the Future of Dooyeweerd Studies", Philosophia Reformata, 70 (1): 23–40, doi:10.1163/22116117-90000340.

A special issue of the journal Axiomathes was devoted to the subject of "Philosophy and Science in the Thought of Herman Dooyeweerd".

- Clouser, Roy (2010). "A Brief Sketch of the Philosophy of Herman Dooyeweerd". Axiomathes. 20 (1): 3–17. doi:10.1007/s10516-009-9075-2. S2CID 55421582.
- Strauss, D.F.M (2010). "The Significance of a Non-Reductionist Ontology for the Discipline of Mathematics: A Historical and Systematic Analysis". Axiomathes. 20 (1): 19–52. doi:10.1007/s10516-009-9080-5. S2CID 122405137.
- Strauss, D.F.M (2010). "The Significance of a Non-Reductionist Ontology for the Discipline of Physics: A Historical and Systematic Analysis". Axiomathes. 20 (1): 53–80. doi:10.1007/s10516-009-9081-4. S2CID 195233860.
- García de la Sienra, Adolfo (2010). "The Economic Sphere". Axiomathes. 20 (1): 81–94. doi:10.1007/s10516-009-9077-0. S2CID 195233965.
- Skillen, James W. (2010). "The Necessity of a Non-Reductionist Science of Politics". Axiomathes. 20 (1): 95–106. doi:10.1007/s10516-009-9076-1. S2CID 154309247.
- Schuurman, Egbert (2010). "Responsible Ethics for Global Technology". Axiomathes. 20 (1): 107–27. doi:10.1007/s10516-009-9079-y.
- Vasta, Salvatore (2010). "A New "Essential Tension" for Rationality and Culture. What Happens if Politics Tries to Encounter Science Again". Axiomathes. 20 (1): 129–143. doi:10.1007/s10516-009-9082-3. S2CID 153773880.

=== Introductions to Dooyeweerd's Thought ===
- Clouser, Roy A. (2005). The Myth of Religious Neutrality: An Essay on the Hidden Role of Religious Belief in Theories (2 ed.). University of Notre Dame Press. ISBN 978-0-26802366-9.
- Hommes, Hendrik Jan van Eikema (1982). Inleiding tot de wijsbegeerte van Herman Dooyeweerd. The Hague: Martinus Nijhoff.
- Kalsbeek, L. (1976). Contours of a Christian Philosophy: An Introduction to Herman Dooyeweerd's Thought, trans. Bernard Zylstra and Josina Zylstra. Toronto: Wedge Publishing Foundation.
  - Originally published in Dutch as Kalsbeek, L (1970). De Wijsbegeerte der Wetsidee: Proeve van een christelijke filosofie (PDF). Amsterdam: Buijten & Schipperheijn. Archived from the original (PDF) on 2016-03-05.
- Marcel, Pierre-Charles (2013). The Transcendental Critique of Theoretical Thought, trans. Colin Wright. Volume 1 of The Christian Philosophy of Herman Dooyeweerd. Aalten, Netherlands: Wordbridge Publishing.
- Marcel, Pierre-Charles (2013). The General Theory of the Law-Spheres, trans. Colin Wright. Volume 2 of The Christian Philosophy of Herman Dooyeweerd. Aalten, Netherlands: Wordbridge Publishing.
- Spier, J.M. (1954). An Introduction to Christian Philosophy, trans. David H. Freeman. Philadelphia: Presbyterian and Reformed Publishing Company.
  - Originally published in Dutch as Spier, J.M. (1950). Een inleiding tot de wijsbegeerte der wetsidee (4 ed.). Kok: Kampen.
- Strauss, D.F.M. (2015), Herman Dooyeweerd's Philosophy (PDF), archived from the original (PDF) on 8 August 2017
  - Provides a more extensive systematic orientation in Dooyeweerd’s philosophy.
- Troost, Andree (2012). What is Reformational Philosophy? An Introduction To The Cosmonomic Philosophy of Herman Dooyeweerd. Jordan Station: Paideia Press. ISBN 978-0-88815-205-3.
- Wolfe, Samuel T. (1978). A Key to Dooyeweerd. Philadelphia: Presbyterian and Reformed Publishing Company.

=== Influences and Development ===
- Henderson, Roger (1994). Illuminating Law: The Construction of Herman Dooyeweerd's Philosophy, 1918 - 1928. Amsterdam: Buijten & Schipperheijn.
- Friesen, J Glenn (2003). "The Mystical Dooyeweerd: The Relation of His Thought to Franz von Baader". Ars Disputandi. 3 (1): 16–61. doi:10.1080/15665399.2003.10819763.
  - One of the most controversial articles in the literature on Dooyeweerd's intellectual development, Friesen argues that twenty-five key ideas in Dooyeweerd's writings "can already be found in the nineteenth century German philosopher, Franz von Baader".
- Friesen, J. Glenn (2005). "Dooyeweerd versus Vollenhoven: The religious dialectic within reformational philosophy". Philosophia Reformata. 70 (2): 102–132. doi:10.1163/22116117-90000355.
- Kraay, John (1979). "Successive Conceptions in the Development of the Christian Philosophy of Herman Dooyeweerd (I)" (PDF). Philosophia Reformata. 44 (2): 137–149. doi:10.1163/22116117-90001335.
- Kraay, John (1980). "Successive Conceptions in the Development of the Christian Philosophy of Herman Dooyeweerd (II)" (PDF). Philosophia Reformata. 45 (1): 1–46. doi:10.1163/22116117-90001342.
- Strauss, Daniël FM (2004). "Intellectual Influences upon the Reformational Philosophy of Dooyeweerd" (PDF). Philosophia Reformata. 69 (2): 151–81. doi:10.1163/22116117-90000323..
  - One of the first responses to Friesen (2003), Strauss argues that the idea "there is any direct influence on his [Dooyeweerd's] thought from Von Baader can not be substantiated on the basis of the available sources even though it is not unlikely that he might have been aware of the existence of Von Baader".
- Verburg, Marcel (1989). Herman Dooyeweerd: Leven en werk van een Nederlands christen-wijsgeer. Baarn: Ten Have., translated by Herbert Donald Morton and Harry Van Dyke as Herman Dooyeweerd: The Life and Work of a Christian Philosopher, Jordan Station: Paideia Press, 2015.
- Wolters, Albert (1985). "The Intellectual Milieu of Herman Dooyeweerd". In McIntyre, C.T. (ed.). The Legacy of Herman Dooyeweerd: Reflections on Critical Philosophy in the Christian Tradition. Lanham, Maryland: University Press of America. pp. 4–10. ISBN 9780819150332..
