= Dutch Canadians =

Ethnic group

Nederlandse Canadezen (Dutch) Canadiens néerlandais (French)
- Dutch ancestry percent in Canada (2021)

Total population
- 1,111,655 (2016 Census)

Regions with significant populations
- Alberta, British Columbia, Atlantic Canada, Ontario, Quebec, Western Canada

Languages
- Canadian English, Canadian French, Dutch, Frisian, Limburgish

Religion
- Protestantism, Roman Catholicism

Related ethnic groups
- Dutch people, Dutch Americans

Dutch Canadians (Dutch: Nederlandse Canadezen) are Canadians with full or partial Dutch ancestry. According to the Canada 2006 Census, there were 1,035,965 Canadians of Dutch descent, including those of full or partial ancestry. This increased to 1,111,655 or about 4.2% of the entire population of Canada in 2016.

== History ==
Dutch Canadian Population History
Year	Pop.	±%
1871	29,662	—
1881	30,412	+2.5%
1901	33,845	+11.3%
1911	55,961	+65.3%
1921	117,505	+110.0%
1931	148,962	+26.8%
1941	212,863	+42.9%
1951	264,267	+24.1%
1961	429,679	+62.6%
1971	425,945	−0.9%
1981	408,235	−4.2%
1986	881,935	+116.0%
1991	961,595	+9.0%
1996	916,215	−4.7%
2001	923,310	+0.8%
2006	1,035,965	+12.2%
2011	1,067,245	+3.0%
2016	1,111,655	+4.2%
Source: Statistics Canada Note: 1981 Canadian census did not include multiple ethnic origin responses, thus population is an undercount.

The first Dutch people to come to Canada were Dutch Americans among the United Empire Loyalists. The largest wave was in the late nineteenth and early twentieth century when large numbers of Dutch helped settle the Canadian west. During this period significant numbers also settled in major cities like Toronto. While interrupted by the First World War this migration returned in the 1920s, but again halted during the Great Depression and Second World War.

After World War II, a large number of Dutch immigrants moved to Canada, including a number of war brides of the Canadian soldiers who liberated the Netherlands. There were officially 1,886 Dutch war brides to Canada, ranking second after British war brides. During the war, Canada had sheltered Crown Princess Juliana and her family. The annual Canadian Tulip Festival held in May commemorates her with a generous number of tulips coming from The Netherlands. Due to these close links Canada became a popular destination for Dutch immigrants. The Canadian government encouraged this, recruiting skilled workers. This post-war wave went mainly to urban centres such as Toronto, Ottawa, and Vancouver. With the economic recovery of the Netherlands in the post-war years immigration to Canada slowed.

While one of the largest minority groups in Canada, Dutch Canadians have tended to rapidly assimilate and there are relatively few Dutch Canadian organizations and media. One important institution is the Christian Reformed Church in North America, with most congregations found throughout Alberta, British Columbia, and Ontario. The Institute for Christian Studies in Toronto, The King's University in Edmonton, and Redeemer University in Ancaster, Ontario are associated with this Dutch Reformed/Calvinist denomination. Christian Schools International, the Christian Labour Association of Canada, and the Christian Farmers Federation of Ontario are organizations with strong Dutch-Canadian roots. In his book To All Our Children: The Story of The Postwar Dutch Immigration to Canada, Albert VanderMey explains that in Edmonton, Dutch Canadian immigrants "also set up a credit union, a burial fund, three elementary Christian schools and one Christian high school, and a home for senior citizens." (Note: The high school to which VanderMey refers is Edmonton Christian High School and the credit union is the Christian Credit Union.)

Dutch Canadians, because of their shared cultural and religious heritage, tend to form tight-knit communities. This has led to an in-joke known as "Dutch bingo", where it is said that a Dutch Canadian is able to figure out their connection to another Dutch Canadian by asking questions about the other's last name, town of birth, church and the college they attended.

== Geographical distribution ==
Data from this section from Statistics Canada, 2021.

=== Provinces & territories ===
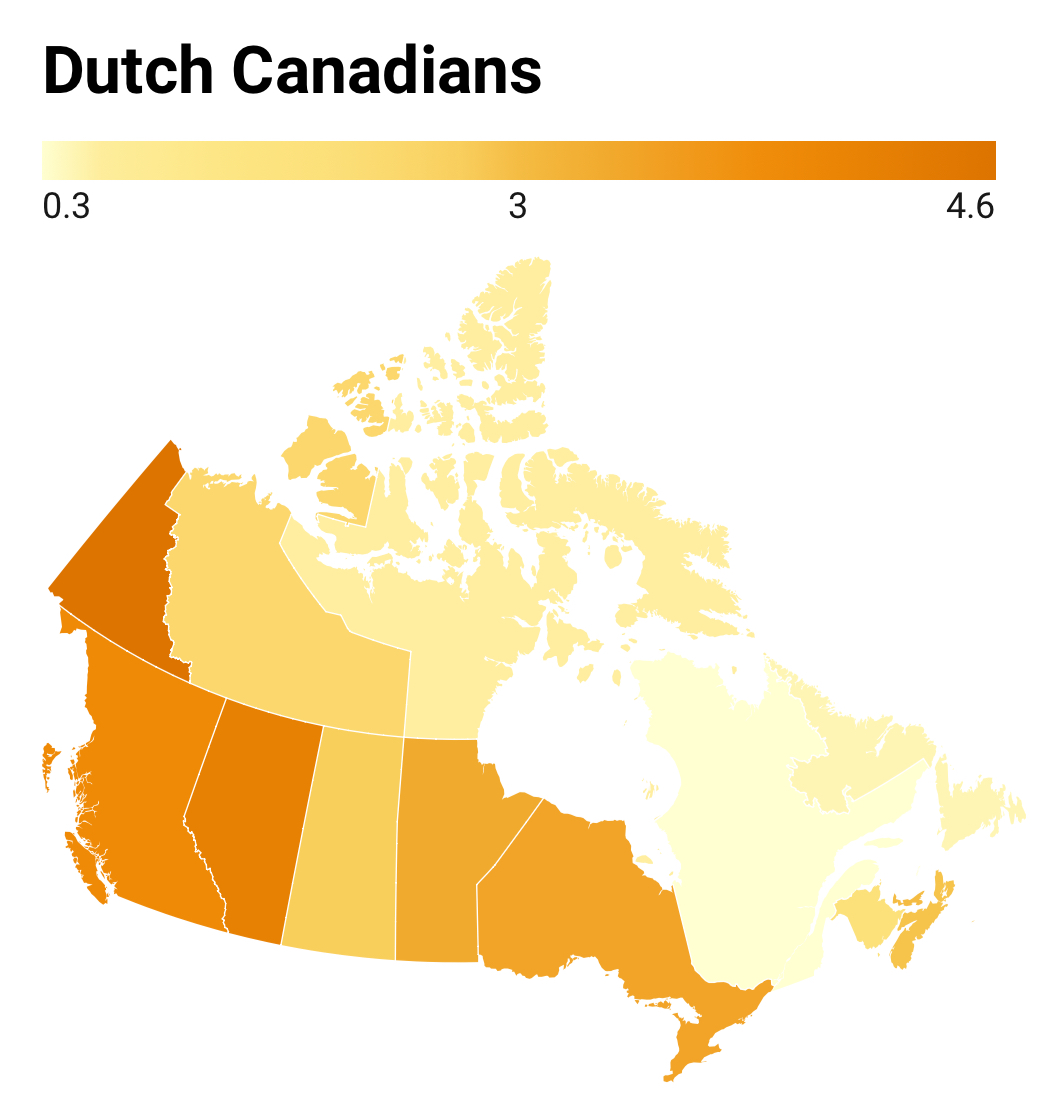
Dutch percent in Canadian provinces/territories, 2021 census

Province / Territory	Percent Dutch	Total Dutch
Alberta	4.2%	174,625
British Columbia	3.9%	189,985
Manitoba	3.3%	43,390
New Brunswick	1.8%	13,310
Newfoundland and Labrador	0.4%	1,830
Northwest Territories	2.3%	940
Nova Scotia	2.9%	27,375
Nunavut	0.5%	185
Ontario	3.4%	478,860
Prince Edward Island	3.0%	4,465
Quebec	0.3%	22,385
Saskatchewan	2.7%	29,410
Yukon	4.6%	1,825
Canada — Total	2.7%	988,585

== Religion ==
Dutch Canadian demography by religion
Religious group	2021 (Note: Religious breakdown proportions based on "Dutch" ethnic or cultural origin response on the 2021 census.)		2001 (Note: Religious breakdown proportions based on "Dutch" ethnic or cultural origin response on the 2001 census.)	
Religious group	Pop.	%	Pop.	%
Christianity	555,660	56.21%	725,210	78.54%
Islam	1,125	0.11%	585	0.06%
Irreligion	418,355	42.32%	190,645	20.64%
Judaism	2,785	0.28%	2,275	0.25%
Buddhism	1,520	0.15%	1,185	0.13%
Hinduism	315	0.03%	150	0.02%
Indigenous spirituality	505	0.05%	—N/a	—N/a
Sikhism	195	0.02%	305	0.03%
Other	8,125	0.82%	2,960	0.32%
Total Dutch Canadian population	988,585	100%	923,310	100%

Dutch Canadian demography by Christian sects
Religious group	2021		2001	
Religious group	Pop.	%	Pop.	%
Catholic	159,270	28.66%	201,105	27.73%
Orthodox	2,080	0.37%	1,810	0.25%
Protestant	214,935	38.68%	476,900	65.76%
Other Christian	179,375	32.28%	45,395	6.26%
Total Dutch Canadian christian population	555,660	100%	725,210	100%

== Notable people ==
=== Academia ===
- Parzival Copes, economist
- Sidney van den Bergh, astronomer

=== Arts and entertainment ===
- Earl W. Bascom, actor, painter, sculptor
- Neve Campbell, actress
- Nicole de Boer, actress
- Sarah de Leeuw, writer (Dutch descent)
- Kristen Hager, actress
- Ernest Hillen, journalist
- Kristin Kreuk, actress
- Cornelius Krieghoff, painter
- Sigmund Brouwer, author, public speaker, athlete
- Robert Naylor, actor
- Patricia Rozema, writer, director
- Sonja Smits, actress (Dutch descent)
- Cobie Smulders, actress
- Jessica Steen, actress
- Dorothy Stratten, model
- Aritha Van Herk, writer
- Laura Vandervoort, actress
- Jeon Somi, singer and songwriter
- Hudson Williams, actor
- Kevin Zegers, actor and model

=== Business ===
- William Cornelius Van Horne, president of CPR

=== Farming ===
- Wiebo Ludwig

=== Politics and civil service ===
- Michael Chong, Conservative MP, Wellington-Halton Hills
- Roméo Dallaire, former Force Commander of UNAMIR peacekeeping force during the Rwandan genocide, former Liberal Senator, humanitarian
- Stephen de Boer, Canada's Ambassador and Permanent Representative to the World Trade Organization in Geneva, Switzerland
- Harry de Jong, Abbotsford, British Columbia Social Credit MLA from 1986 to 1994
- Mike de Jong, Abbotsford, British Columbia Liberal MLA since 1994
- Simon De Jong, former federal Saskatchewan NDP MP
- Jacob De Witt, Member of the Legislative Assembly of Lower Canada, Member of the Legislative Assembly of the Province of Canada
- Rick Dykstra, Conservative MP St. Catharines from 2006 to 2015 and Parliamentary Secretary
- Fred Eisenberger, former Ward Alderman and Mayor of Hamilton, Ontario
- John Gerretsen, former mayor of Kingston, Ontario, former Ontario MPP and provincial cabinet minister
- Samuel Holland, Royal Engineer and first Surveyor General of British North America
- Eiling Kramer, longest-serving member in the history of Saskatchewan's Legislative Assembly
- David Mathews, American Loyalist and former mayor of New York City during the American Revolution who settled in Nova Scotia and became a leading administrator.
- John Oostrom, first Dutch-born MP, Progressive Conservative for Willowdale
- Case Ootes, former city councillor in Toronto; served as deputy mayor under Mayor Mel Lastman and represents one of the two Toronto—Danforth wards
- Maximilien Polak, Quebec Liberal MNA for Saint-Anne from 1981 to 1989
- Egerton Ryerson, Methodist minister, public education advocate, Chief Superintendent of Education for Upper Canada
- Peter Stoffer, NDP MP Sackville-Eastern Shore from 1997 to 2015
- Leah Taylor Roy, Liberal MP Aurora-Oak Ridges-Richmond Hill since 2019
- Jacob Van Buskirk, Representative for Shelburne County in the Nova Scotia House of Assembly from 1805 to 1818
- John van Dongen, Abbotsford, British Columbia Liberal MLA from 1995 to 2013
- Anthony Van Egmond, Member of the Reform Movement in Upper Canada, a leader of the rebels in the Upper Canada Rebellion
- Dave Van Kesteren, Conservative MP, Chatham-Kent-Leamington
- Bill Vander Zalm, 28th Premier of British Columbia
- Adam Swart Vedder, Westminster-Chilliwhack, British Columbia MLA from 1897 to 1898
- Elizabeth Witmer, former Progressive Conservative MPP, Ontario cabinet minister and Chair of Workplace Safety & Insurance Board of Ontario

=== Sports ===
- Earl W. Bascom, rodeo pioneer, first rodeo champion inducted into Canada's Sports Hall of Fame, "father of modern rodeo"
- Kyle Bekker, soccer player
- Ted-Jan Bloemen, Olympic speed skater, born in the Netherlands with a Canadian-born father
- Jeff Beukeboom, retired NHL ice hockey player
- Jay Bouwmeester, former NHL ice hockey player
- Leon Boyd, former professional baseball player
- Troy Brouwer, former NHL ice hockey player
- Petra Burka, Olympic figure skater, Dutch born
- Tiago Codinha, soccer player
- Peter DeBoer, former ice hockey player and current NHL coach
- Brian de Bruijn, former ice hockey player
- Calvin de Haan, NHL player for the New York Rangers
- Jason de Vos, retired professional soccer player
- Greg de Vries, former NHL ice hockey player
- Karl Dykhuis, ice hockey player; first cousin of Mark Brodwin, astrophysicist
- Steve Dykstra, former NHL ice hockey player
- Harry Geris, wrestler
- Phil Groeneveld, former ice hockey player
- Sara Groenewegen, softball pitcher
- Dan Hamhuis, former NHL ice hockey player
- Cecil Hoekstra, former ice hockey player
- Ed Hoekstra, former NHL ice hockey player
- Bill Hogaboam, retired NHL player for the Minnesota North Stars and Detroit Red Wings
- Astrid Jansen, figure skater
- Steve Jansen, soccer player
- Ferdi Kadıoğlu, soccer player
- Slater Koekkoek, NHL player for the Edmonton Oilers
- Nick Kuiper, former ice hockey player
- Jamie Linden, former ice hockey player
- Trevor Linden, retired ice hockey player and former General Manager in the NHL for the Vancouver Canucks
- Dwight Lodeweges, footballer, manager
- George Momberg, professional wrestler known by stage name "Killer Karl Krupp"
- Matt Murray, NHL goaltender for the Seattle Kraken
- Jake Muzzin, defenseman for the Toronto Maple Leafs
- Joe Nieuwendyk, former ice hockey player in the NHL, Hockey Hall of Fame member and former General Manager of the Dallas Stars
- Beorn Nijenhuis, speed skater, who represents the Netherlands at the 2006 Winter Olympics
- Pete Peeters, former NHL ice hockey player
- Paul Postma, ice hockey player
- Daniel Sprong, ice hockey player in the NHL for the Seattle Kraken
- Eric Staal, ice hockey player in the NHL for the Florida Panthers
- Jared Staal, ice hockey player formerly in the American Hockey League (AHL) for the Charlotte Checkers
- Jordan Staal, ice hockey player in the NHL for the Carolina Hurricanes
- Marc Staal, ice hockey player in the NHL for the Florida Panthers
- Evert van Benthem, speed skater, won the Elfstedentocht in 1985 and 1986
- Wayne Van Dorp, former ice hockey player in the NHL
- Debbie Van Kiekebelt, track and field athlete
- Adam van Koeverden, Olympic gold medallist in K-1 500 m; his last name relates him to the Dutch city of Coevorden
- Lauren van Oosten, swimmer
- John van 't Schip, footballer, manager currently serving Greece national football team
- John Van Boxmeer, former ice hockey player in the NHL
- Ryan VandenBussche, former ice hockey player in the NHL
- Kelly VanderBeek, alpine skier
- David Van der Gulik, former ice hockey player in the NHL
- Mike Vanderjagt, most accurate kicker in NFL history; played for the Indianapolis Colts and Dallas Cowboys
- Jim Vandermeer, ice hockey player in the NHL
- Pete Vandermeer, former ice hockey player
- Ed Van Impe, former NHL ice hockey player
- Mike Van Ryn, former NHL ice hockey player and current assistant coach for the Toronto Maple Leafs
- Pat Verbeek, former ice hockey player in the NHL
- Tonya Verbeek, Sport wrestler, three time Olympic medallist
- Noah Verhoeven, Soccer player for Atlético Ottawa
- Kris Versteeg, retired NHL ice hockey player for the Chicago Blackhawks
- Mitch Versteeg, former ice hockey player
- Dennis Ververgaert, former NHL ice hockey player
- John Wensink, former NHL ice hockey player
- Eppie Wietzes, racing driver
- Steve Yzerman, retired NHL player for the Detroit Red Wings
- Marcel De Jong

== See also ==
- Canada–Netherlands relations
- Dutch Americans
- Edmonton Dutch Canadian Centre
- European Canadians
- Belgian Canadians
- French Canadians
- German Canadians
- Luxembourgish Canadians
