= Christian Credit Union =

Credit union in Alberta, Canada

Coordinates: 53.5975°N 113.5667°W

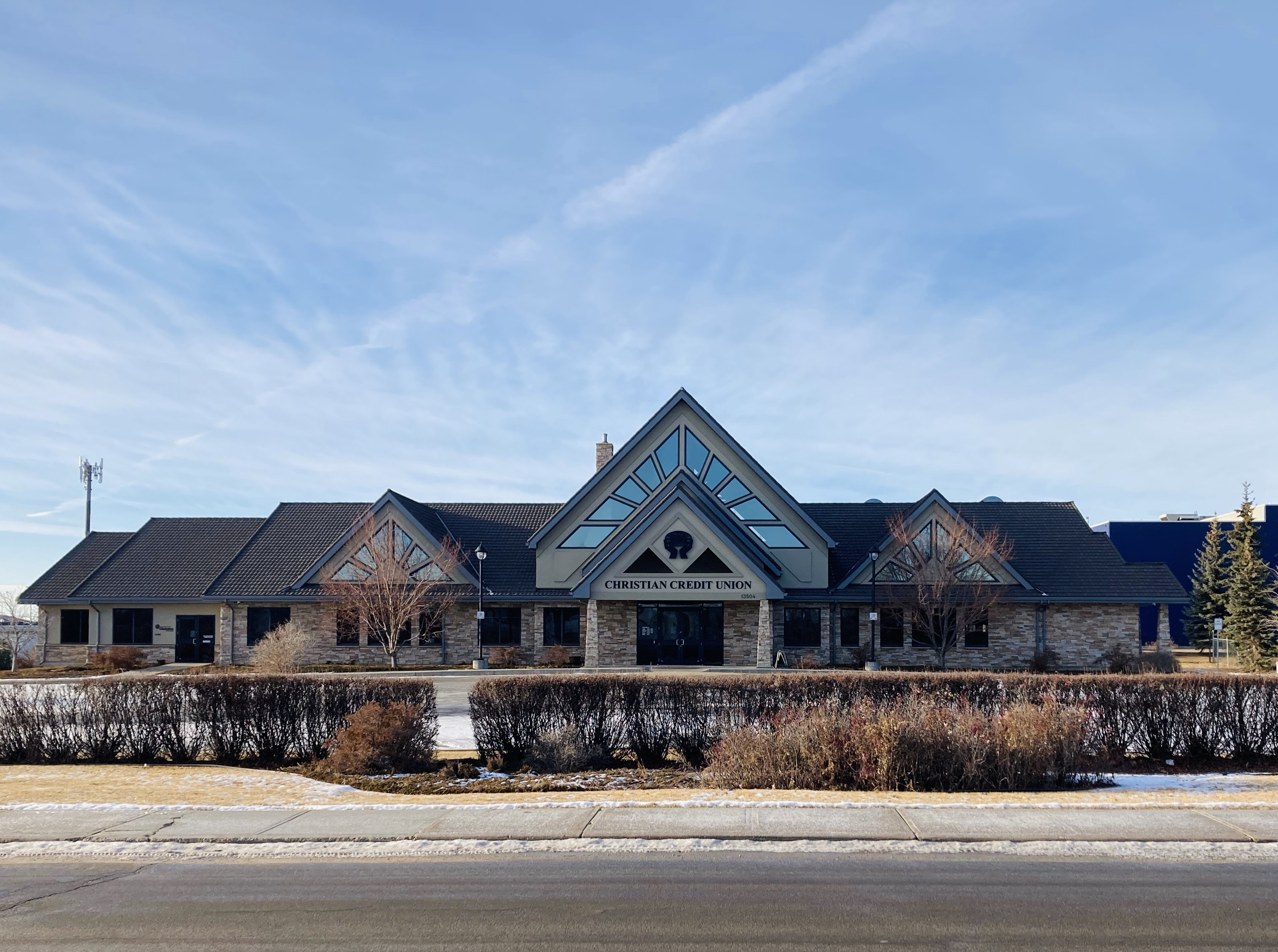
- The Christian Credit Union in 2023
- Industry: Credit unions
- Founded: 1952; 74 years ago
- Headquarters: Christian Credit Union Ltd. 13504 142 Street NW, Edmonton, Alberta, Canada
- Website: www.christiancu.ca

The Christian Credit Union is a Canadian credit union that provides banking services in Alberta. It was founded by Dutch-Canadian settlers in 1952. Its name comes from its relationship with Dutch-Canadian settlers that belonged to the Christian Reformed Church.

== History ==
The Christian Credit Union was first organized by Dutch-Canadian settlers in the late 1940s, although it was not officially incorporated until 1952. In 1983, Albert VanderMey discussed the influence that the Canadian credit union movement had on Dutch-Canadian settlers alongside a photograph of Edmonton's Christian Credit Union at its former location at 10704 107 Avenue. The history of the Christian Credit Union and its relationship to Dutch-Canadian settlers and the Christian Reformed Church (CRC) has been outlined by a number of publications since the bank's inception; for example, in 1978, the Calvinist Contact explained that "members of the reformed community in Edmonton are encouraged to make use of the facilities of the Christian Credit Union... [which] provides low interest monies to churches and schools for building projects." In 2010, the Edmonton Journal contextualized the Christian Credit Union as an outgrowth of the Christian Reformed Church (CRC) in Edmonton, explaining that "CRC congregations have worked together to assist with the formation of many Edmonton-area entities," including the Christian Credit Union, as well as Edmonton Christian School and The King's University.

A 1985 local history book titled A Furrow Laid Bare specifies Mr. William De Boer as a continuous member of the Christian Credit Union's leadership team from 1965 until 1980. In 1982, in conjunction with the credit union's 30th anniversary, scholars debated "the role of a Christian Credit Union" at the annual Alberta conference of the Association for the Advancement of Christian Scholarship; the idea of having Christian schools, Christian banks and other Christian institutions within a secular society stems from the neo-Calvinist concepts of pillarisation and sphere sovereignty. On February 21, 2003 the Dutch Canadian Savings & Credit Union amalgamated with the Christian Credit Union.

Unrelated to its association with Dutch Reformed settlers in Alberta, the National Post recognized the Christian Credit Union in 2006 for being an early adapter of mobile computing.

== Community involvement ==
Since its inception, the Christian Credit Union has sponsored a number of community events throughout Alberta. In 2002, the Alberta Association of Fundraising Executives publicly recognized the Christian Credit Union for its contributions to charitable causes. Following the Christian Credit Union's sponsorship of a concert and award ceremony at the Francis Winspear Centre in Edmonton in 2002, the Christian Courier reported that the Christian Credit Union had donated a "half-million dollar gift... the largest donation in its history [to] six Christian schools across the province... as well [as] the Christian Senior Citizen's Society of Northern Alberta." In 2023, when the Christian Credit Union sponsored a 5K run in Coaldale, Alberta, the Taber Times described the bank as an organization that “value[s] our community, our youth, and active living.”

== Criminal activity ==
Criminal activities such as theft and fraud were reported to have taken place at the Christian Credit Union in 1972, 1986, and 1992. While the 1992 incident did not lead to prosecution, the 1972 and 1988 incidents involved Christian Credit Union staff testifying in court and ultimately led to imprisonment.

== See also ==
- Christian Reformed Church in North America
- Dutch Canadians
- Edmonton Christian School
- Institute for Christian Studies
- The King's University
