= Canada 150 tulip =

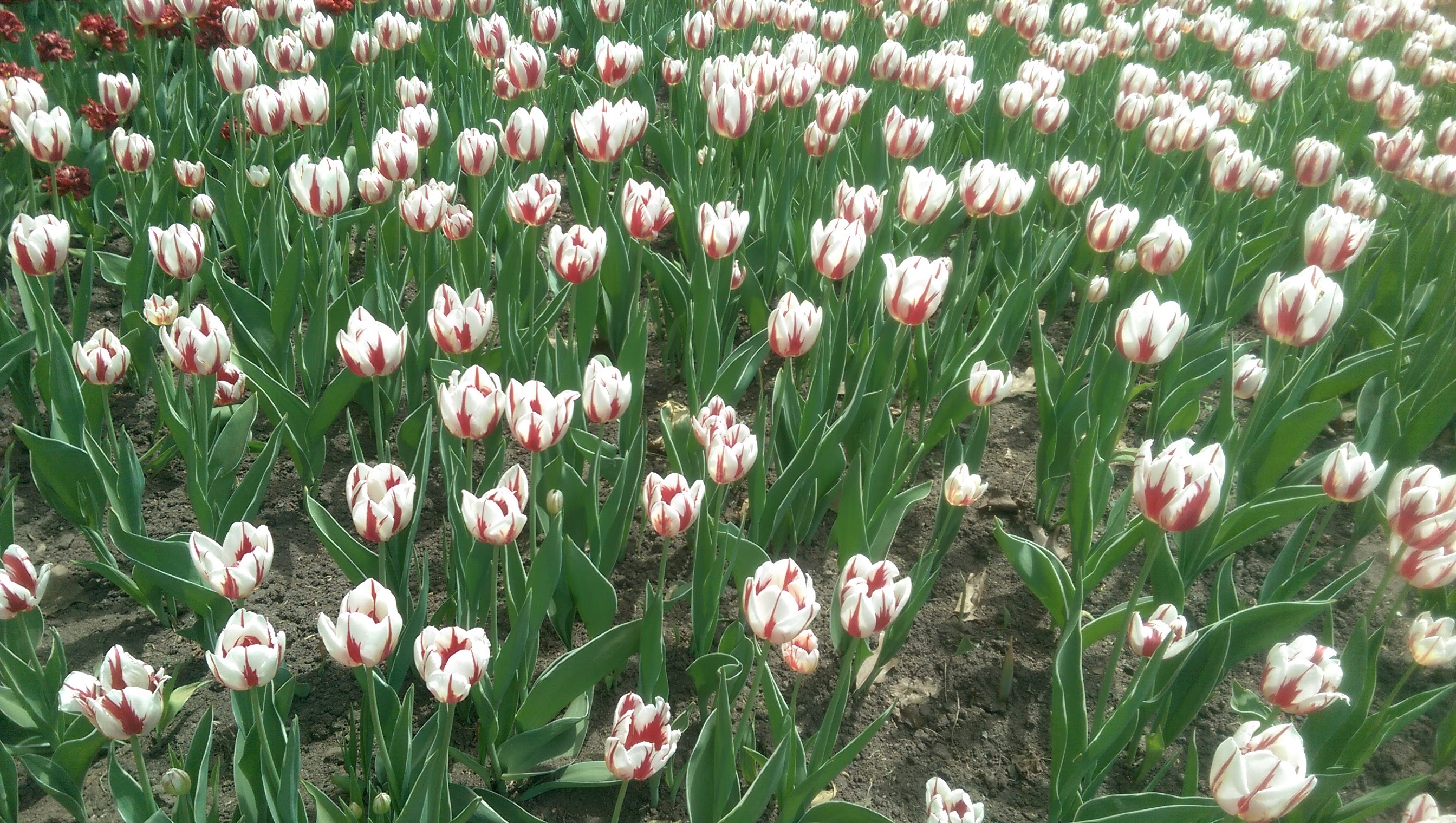
- Genus: Tulipa
- Cultivar group: Triumph Group
- Cultivar: 'Carnaval de Rio'
- Marketing names: Canada 150
- Origin: Netherlands

The Canada 150 tulip, also known as the Maple Leaf tulip, is the official tulip of the 150th anniversary of Canada and was unveiled May 9, 2016, in Commissioners Park. The tulip was selectively bred with an elegant white flower and red flames, which resembles the flag of Canada. In September 2016, tulip bulbs went on sale at Home Hardware stores. For Canada's sesquicentennial celebration in 2017, the Canadian Tulip Festival in Ottawa planted over 200,000 Maple Leaf tulip bulbs.

== Problem with tulip colouring ==
In the spring of 2017, gardeners in southern Ontario reported that some of the tulips blossomed with the incorrect colour of orange, as opposed to the red and white colour as advertised, or did not bloom at all. Home Hardware is investigating, and offering refunds to customers who purchased the incorrect bulbs.
