= Dow's Lake =

Body of water in Ontario, Canada

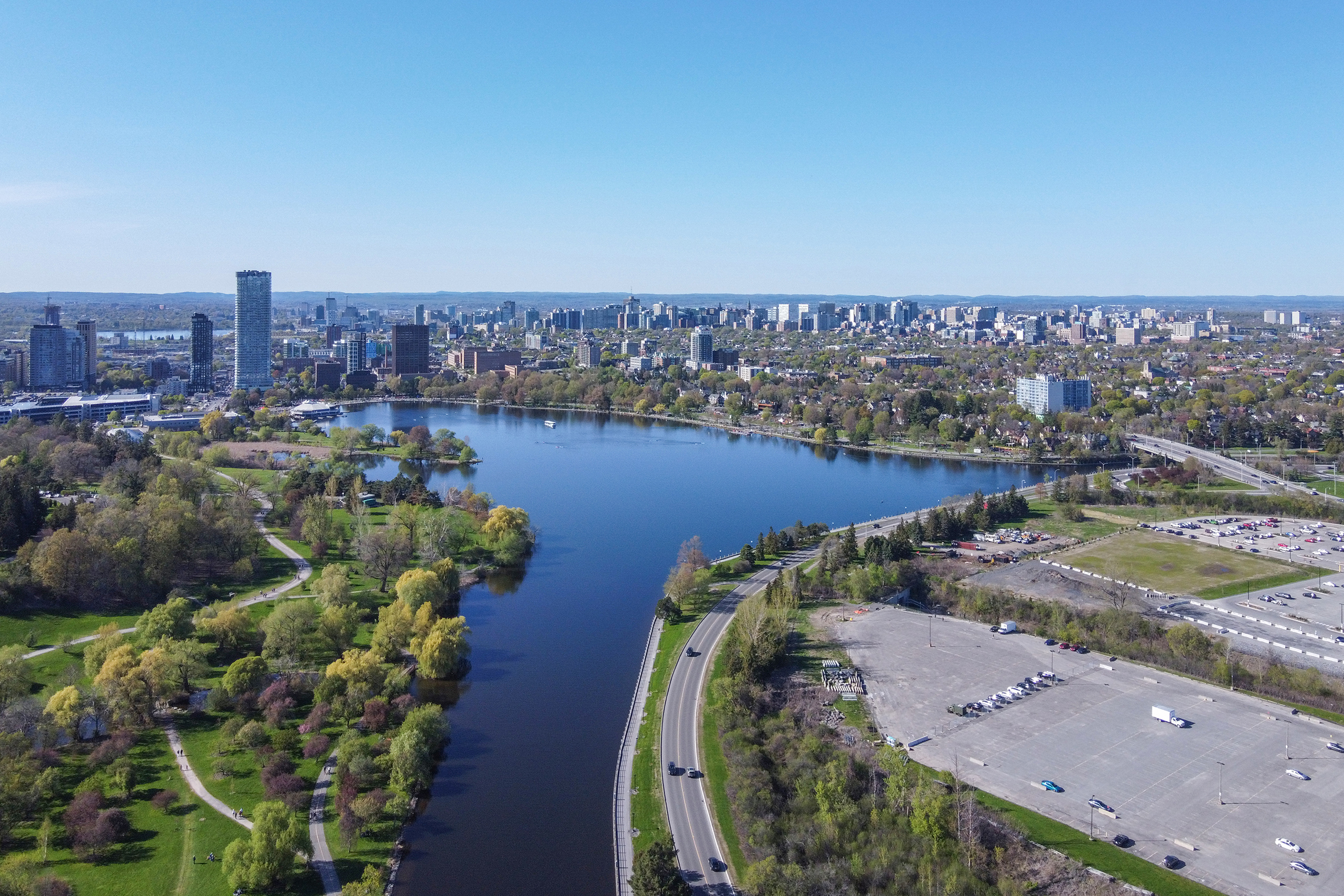
- Aerial view of Dows Lake in 2025

- Location within Ottawa
- Location: Ottawa
- Coordinates: 45.394412°N 75.701551°W
- Lake type: Artificial lake
- Primary inflows: Rideau Canal
- Primary outflows: Rideau Canal
- Basin countries: Canada

Dow's Lake in Ottawa, Ontario, Canada is a small man-made lake on the Rideau Canal, situated two kilometres north of Hog's Back Falls in the middle of Ottawa. It is at the southern end of Preston Street, just south of Carling Avenue, and just to the west of Bronson Avenue. At the southern end of the lake is Carleton University, and to its west is the Dominion Arboretum, at the edge of the Central Experimental Farm.

== History ==
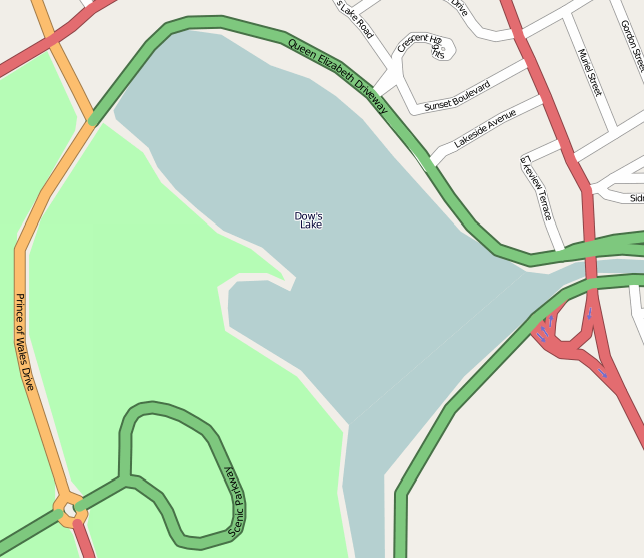
Map of Dow's Lake and adjacent area.

=== Early settlement ===
The lake is named after Abram Dow, an American-born settler who came to Ontario in the early 19th century and who owned land in this area in 1816. Before construction of the canal, this area was known as Dow's Great Swamp. The lake was created when an earthen dam was constructed along the north shore (the north part of Queen Elizabeth Driveway is now atop the dam) to allow flooding for the canal. Originally, the Rideau Canal was to run north from Dow's Lake through property owned by Lieutenant John LeBreton, but land speculation and Lord Dalhousie's and Colonel John By's reluctance to reward such speculation resulted in the current location of the canal between the Lake, and Entrance Bay located between Parliament Hill and the Chateau Laurier.

=== 20th-century developments ===
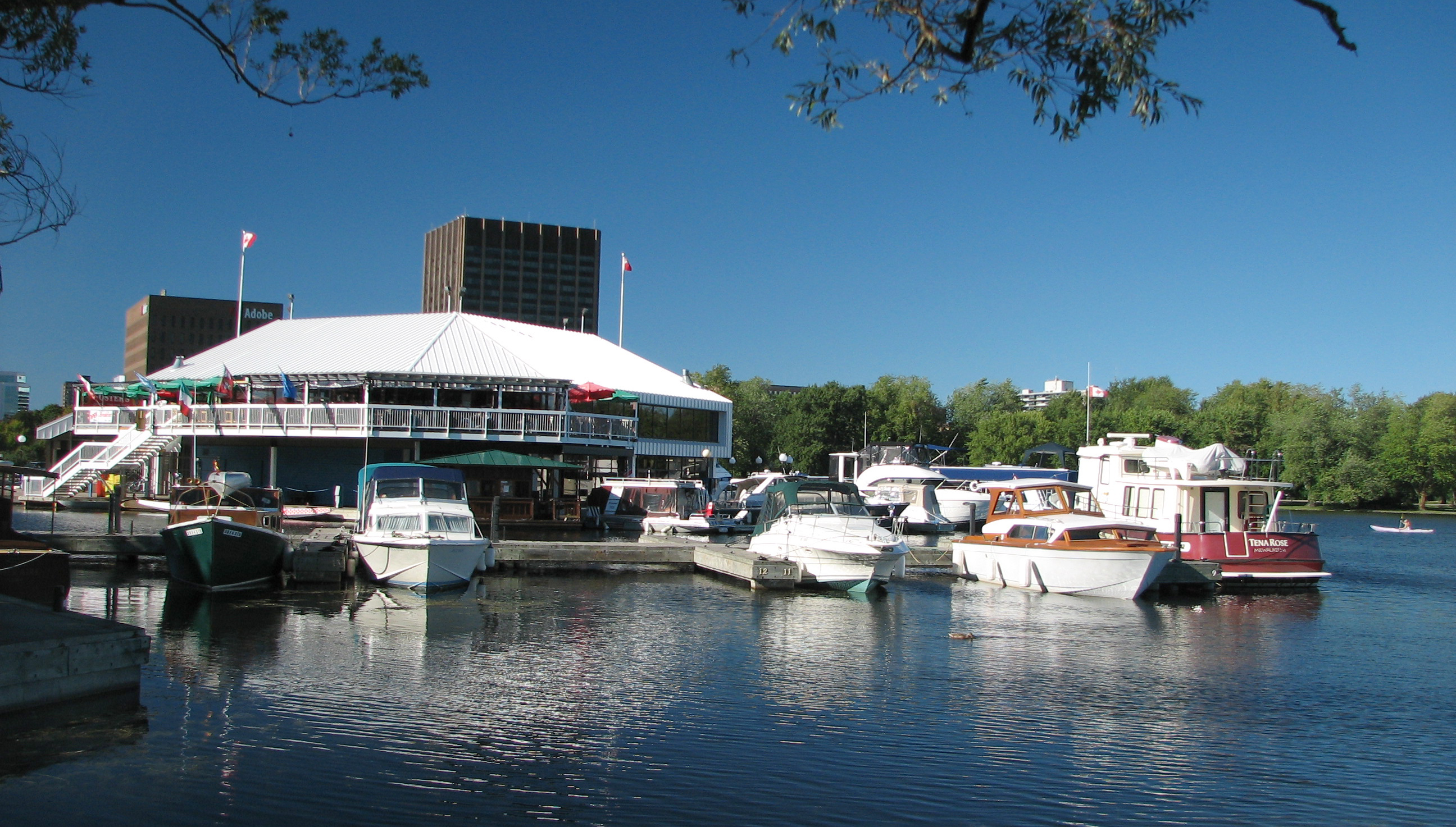
Dows Lake Pavilion

Current parkland and partial residential area to the east consisted of rail-served lumber piling yards until 1928, and the area north of Carling Ave was mostly industrial. The area to the south was dense swampy cedar forest.

Situated next to the Dows Lake pavilion on the western shore is Canadian Forces Reserve Barrack Dow's Lake. This installation, opened in 1943, is home to HMCS Carleton, a unit of the Canadian Naval Reserve.

A rail tunnel, which was formerly owned and operated by Canadian Pacific, passes under the Rideau Canal at the southwest corner of the lake. This tunnel replaced a rail line that crossed the Rideau Canal over a swing bridge and Col By Drive at the same location. The tunnel was completed August 5, 1967 and the adjacent, long rock trench running west of Dow's Lake, roughly parallel to Preston St, eliminated several level road crossings. OC Transpo introduced the O-Train (today's Line 2) in 2001, a light-rail transit system, which is now the only user of the tunnel and trench running diesel multiple unit trainsets both ways every 12 minutes. When Line 2 was reopened in January 2025 after several years of construction enhancements and extensions, Carling Station was renamed Dows Lake Station, even though the Lake is some 300 meters distant.

Unveiled by Princess Margriet of the Netherlands, The Man with Two Hats is a 4.6-metre sculpture by Henk Visch. It commemorates the role played by the Canadian Armed Forces in the liberation of the Netherlands, and a reproduced cast of the sculpture that exists at the National Canadian Liberation Monument in Apeldoorn, Netherlands. Facing the lake, it symbolizes the historical links between Canada and the Netherlands, as well as Princess Margriet's birth at the Ottawa Civic Hospital during the Second World War.

== Visitor activities ==
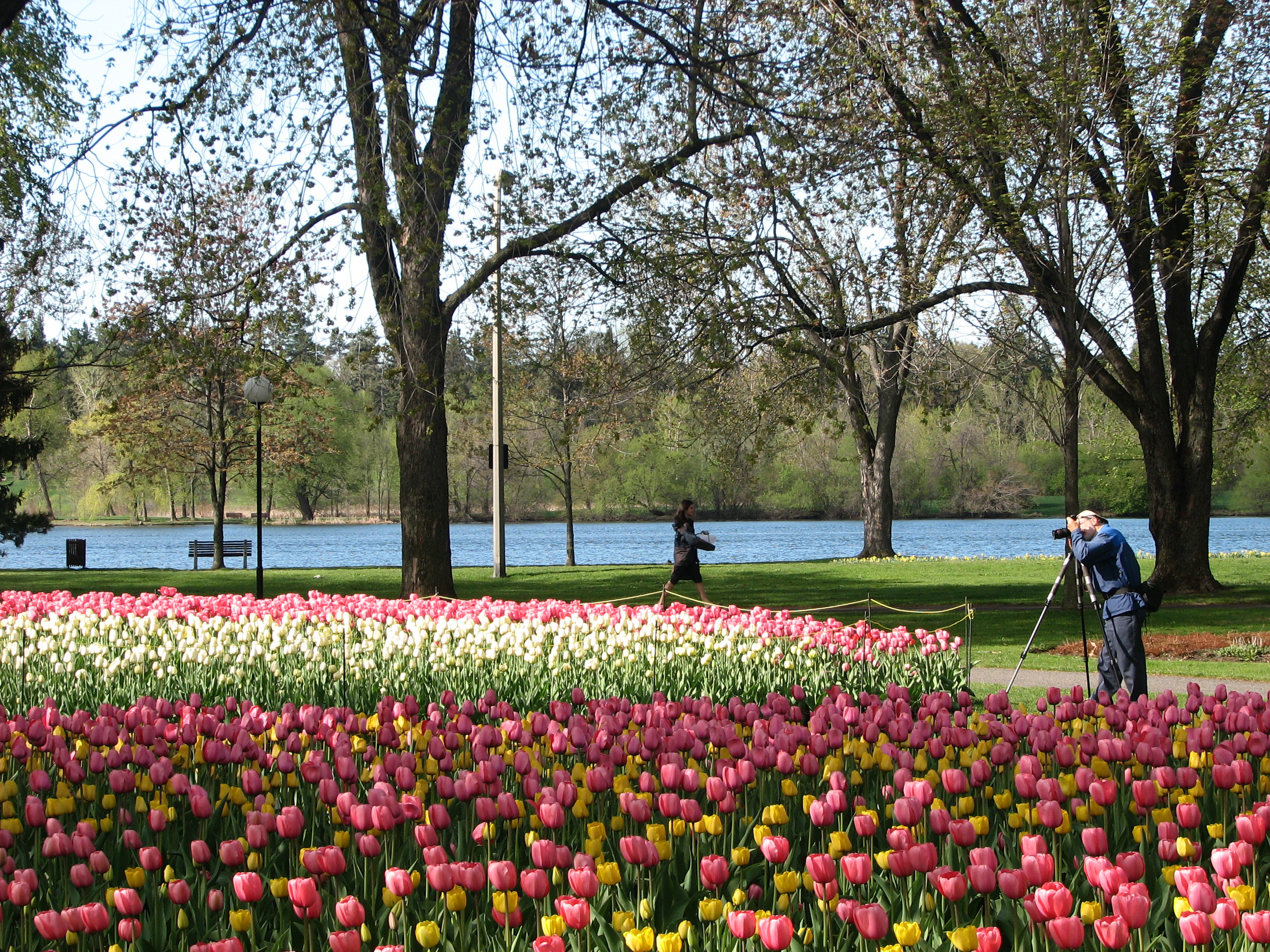
Tulip Festival at Dow's Lake 2006

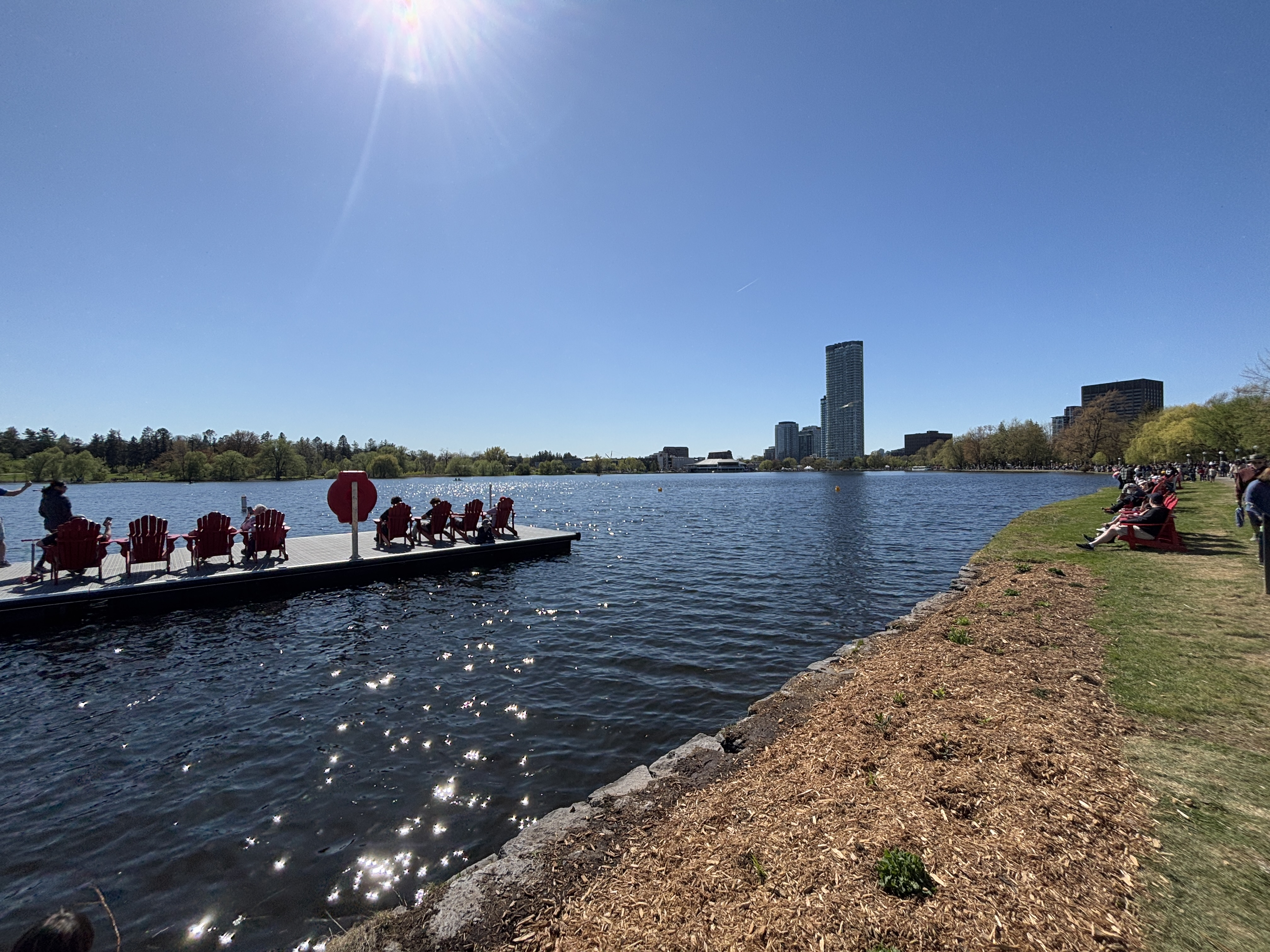
Benches on Dow's Lake

In May, the surrounding park, Commissioners Park, displays tulips planted by the National Capital Commission (NCC) for the annual Canadian Tulip Festival. More than 50 varieties and approximately 300,000 tulips bloom each May along the Rideau Canal. Each year, the Dutch royal family sends 10,000 tulips to Ottawa, as thanks for the city's support during the Second World War.

During the winter, Dow's Lake freezes and becomes part of the world's longest skating rink and one of the primary sites of the Winterlude festival in February, with events such as "bed races" and "waiter races" on the ice.

There are two scenic drives along the canal, which also pass on two sides of the lake. The Queen Elizabeth Driveway, named after the late Queen Elizabeth the Queen Mother (who traveled along it during the 1939 royal visit) runs along the north and west sides of the lake. The Colonel By Drive, named after the founder of the city, Lieutenant-Colonel John By, runs along the south side of the lake.

At the northern end of the lake, a pavilion housing three restaurants overlooks the water. They are Umbrella Bar, Lago and Mexi's. Other services at the pavilion include rentals of canoes, kayaks and paddle boats, boat mooring, and an indoor changing area for skating. It is open year-round.

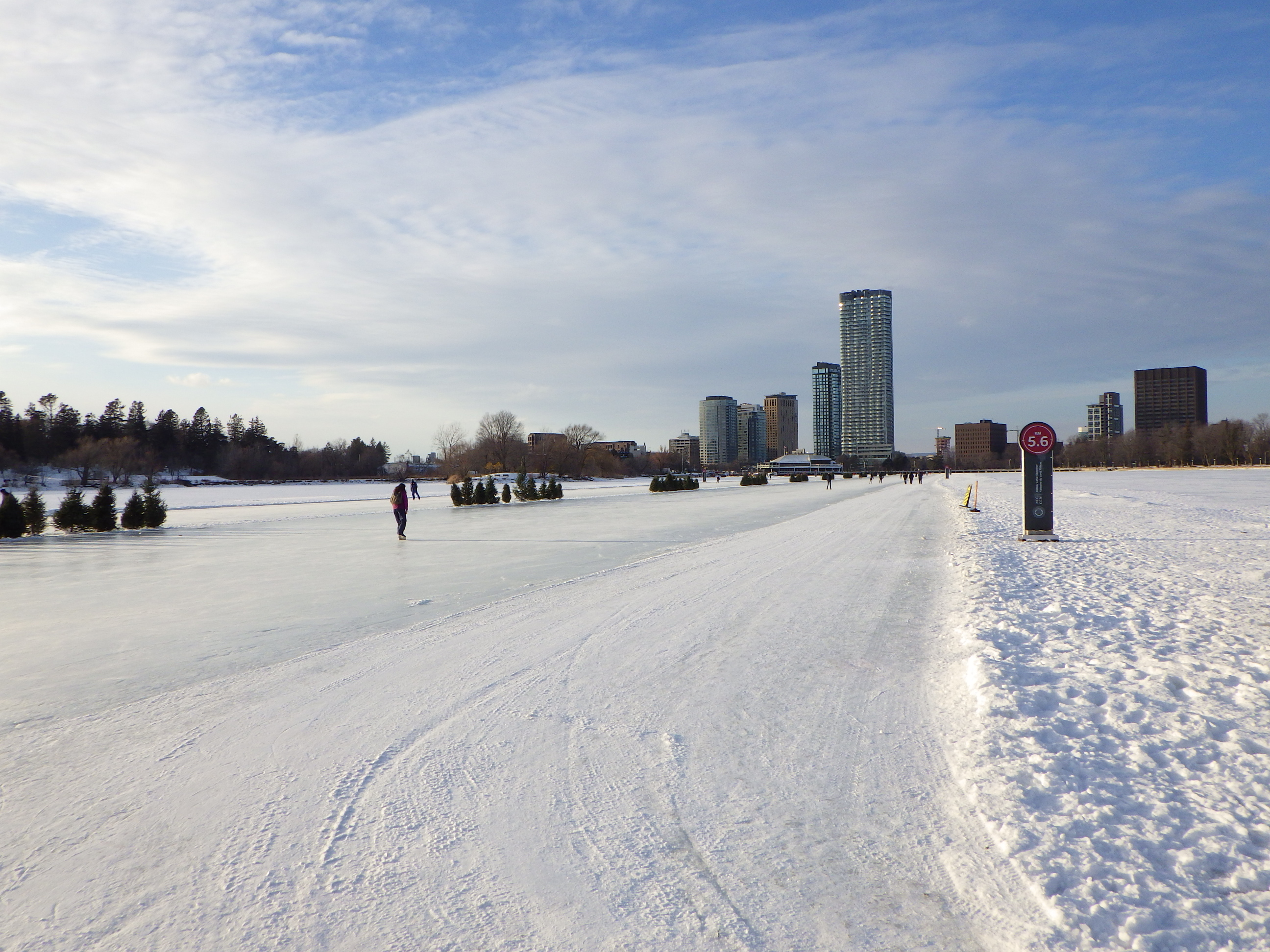
Dow's Lake during winter
