= Christian Courier =

Christian Courier may refer to:

- Christian Courier (Churches of Christ)
- Christian Courier (Canada)
