= Commissioners Park =

Commissioners Park may refer to:

- Commissioners Park (Ottawa), an urban park in the Canadian capital
- Commissioners Park (Naperville, Illinois), a multi-sport recreational area in the Chicago metropolitan area
