= The Man with Two Hats =

Statue in Ottawa, Canada

Coordinates: 45°23′52″N 75°42′19″W

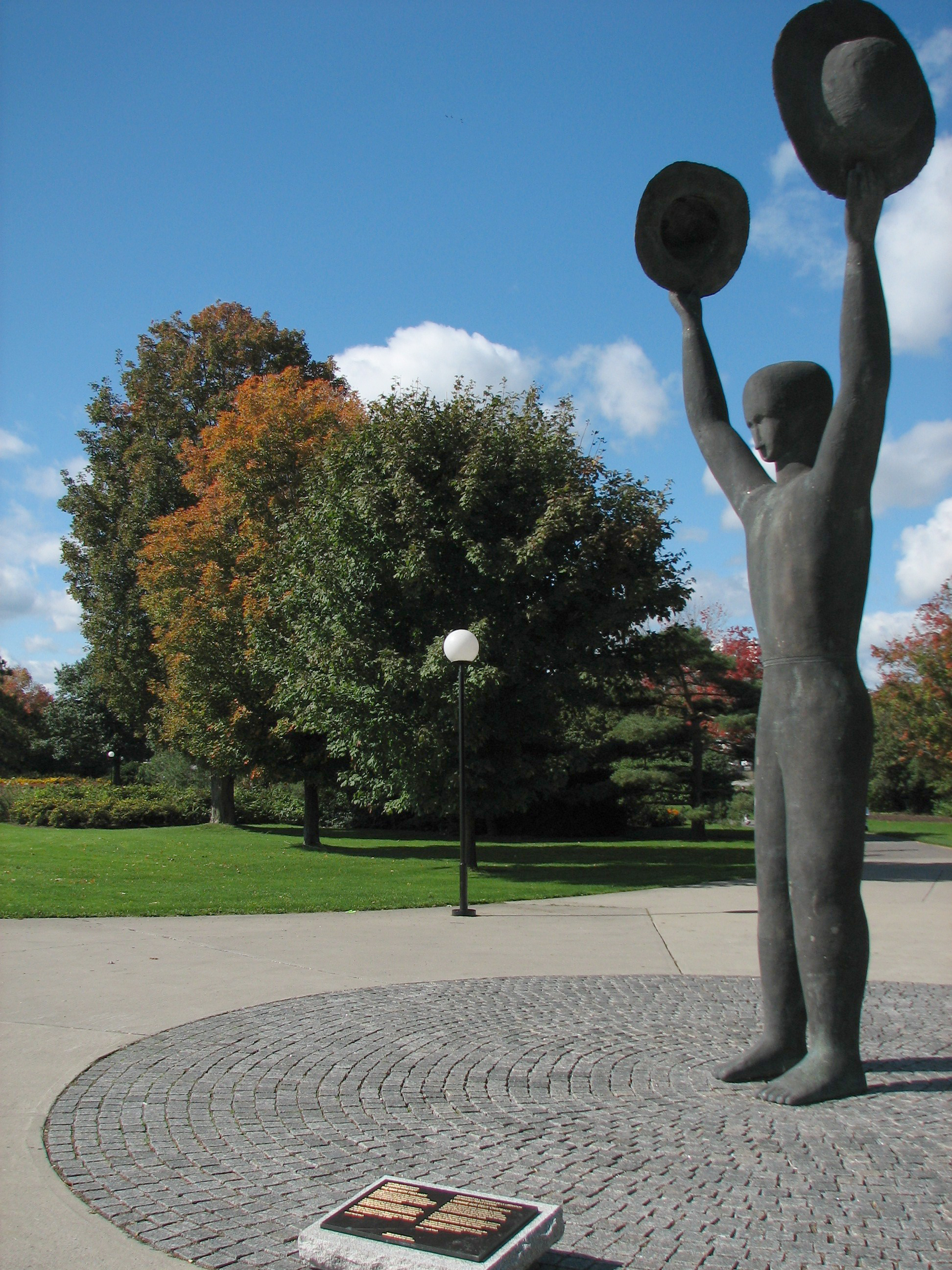
The bronze statue with the plaque visible on the ground.

The Man with Two Hats is a 4.7 m (15 ft) statue in Commissioners Park in Ottawa, Canada. The statue was created by Henk Visch and was unveiled by Princess Margriet of the Netherlands on May 11, 2002. It honours the liberation of the Netherlands. There is an identical statue in the National Canadian Liberation Monument in Apeldoorn in the Netherlands.

== Plaque ==
There is a bronze plaque at the base of the statue. It reads:

During the Second World War, Canadian soldiers played a crucial role in the liberation of the Netherlands. With the donation of this monument – an expression of joy and a celebration of freedom – the Netherlands pays lasting tribute to Canada.

A statue identical to this one stands in Apeldoorn in the Netherlands. The twin monuments symbolically link Canada and the Netherlands; though separated by an ocean, the two countries will forever be close friends.

Her Royal Highness Princess Margriet of the Netherlands unveiled the monument in Ottawa on May 11, 2002, and the other in Apeldoorn on May 2, 2000.

== See also ==
- Canadian Tulip Festival
- Canada–Netherlands relations
