= Canada–Netherlands relations =

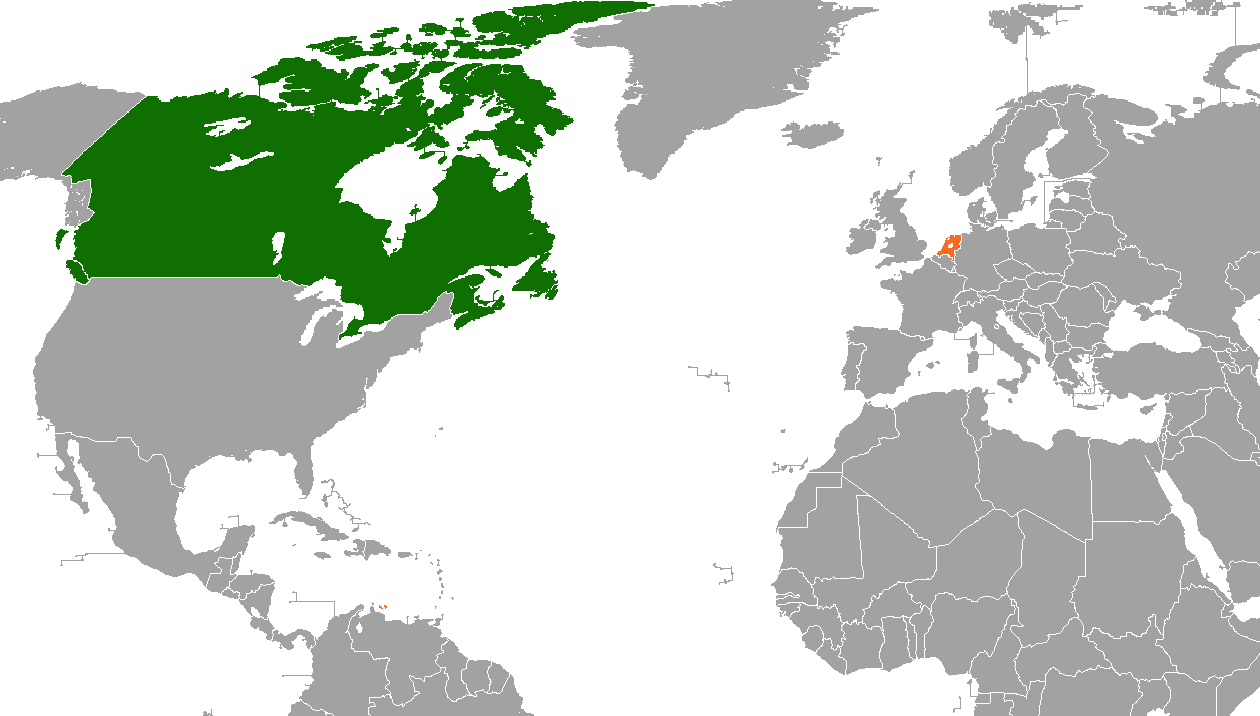

- Canada: Netherlands

Diplomatic mission
- Embassy of Canada, The Hague: Embassy of the Netherlands, Ottawa

Canada and the Kingdom of the Netherlands have a special relationship resulting from actions during World War II when Canada hosted the Dutch royal family in exile and then led the military liberation of the Netherlands. The special relationship is still visible today, with the Canadian government describing the Netherlands as "one of Canada's most significant trade, investment and innovation partners." In part, the annual Canadian Tulip Festival still commemorates this relationship, with a tradition of tulips sent to Canada from the Netherlands as gratitude for the Canadian actions during World War II.

In 2019, Dutch Heritage Day was proclaimed as being on May 5 each year in Canada; coinciding with Liberation Day in the Netherlands.

== History ==
=== World War II to present ===
Following the invasion of the Netherlands and subsequent occupation of the country by Nazi Germany, the Dutch royal family took refuge in Canada. Princess Margriet was born in exile while her family lived in Ottawa. The maternity ward of Ottawa Civic Hospital in which Princess Margriet was born was temporarily declared to be extraterritorial by the Canadian government, thereby allowing her citizenship to be solely determined by her mother's Dutch citizenship. To commemorate the birth, the Canadian Parliament flew the Dutch flag over Peace Tower. This is the only time a foreign flag has flown over the Canadian Parliament Building.

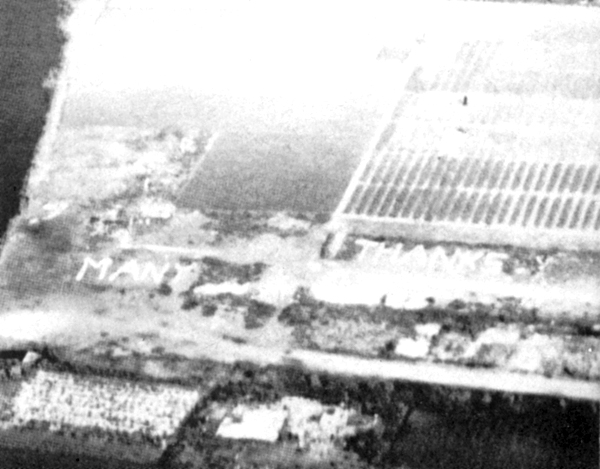
Many Thanks spelt-out on the ground in tulips after Operations Manna and Chowhound over the then-occupied Netherlands

During 1945, the First Canadian Army was responsible for liberating the Netherlands, which they did through battles such as the Battle of the Scheldt and the Liberation of Arnhem. The liberation of the Randstad, one of the most densely populated areas in the world, is especially notable because the civilian population there was still suffering from the horrific effects of the Hongerwinter ('Hungerwinter'). It was cut off from food that was available in the rest of the Netherlands. German forces in the Netherlands would finally surrender in Wageningen, on 5 May 1945, but not before some 18,000 Dutch civilians died as a result of starvation and malnutrition (desperate coordinated air drops of food had already been staged in part by the Royal Canadian Air Force over German-occupied Dutch territory in Operation Manna. Civilians wrote "Thank You Canadians!" on their rooftops in response). Immediately following the surrender, Canadian units were able to move into the Randstad and rapidly distribute desperately needed food supplies, causing many to see the Canadians not only as liberators but as saviours of their lives.

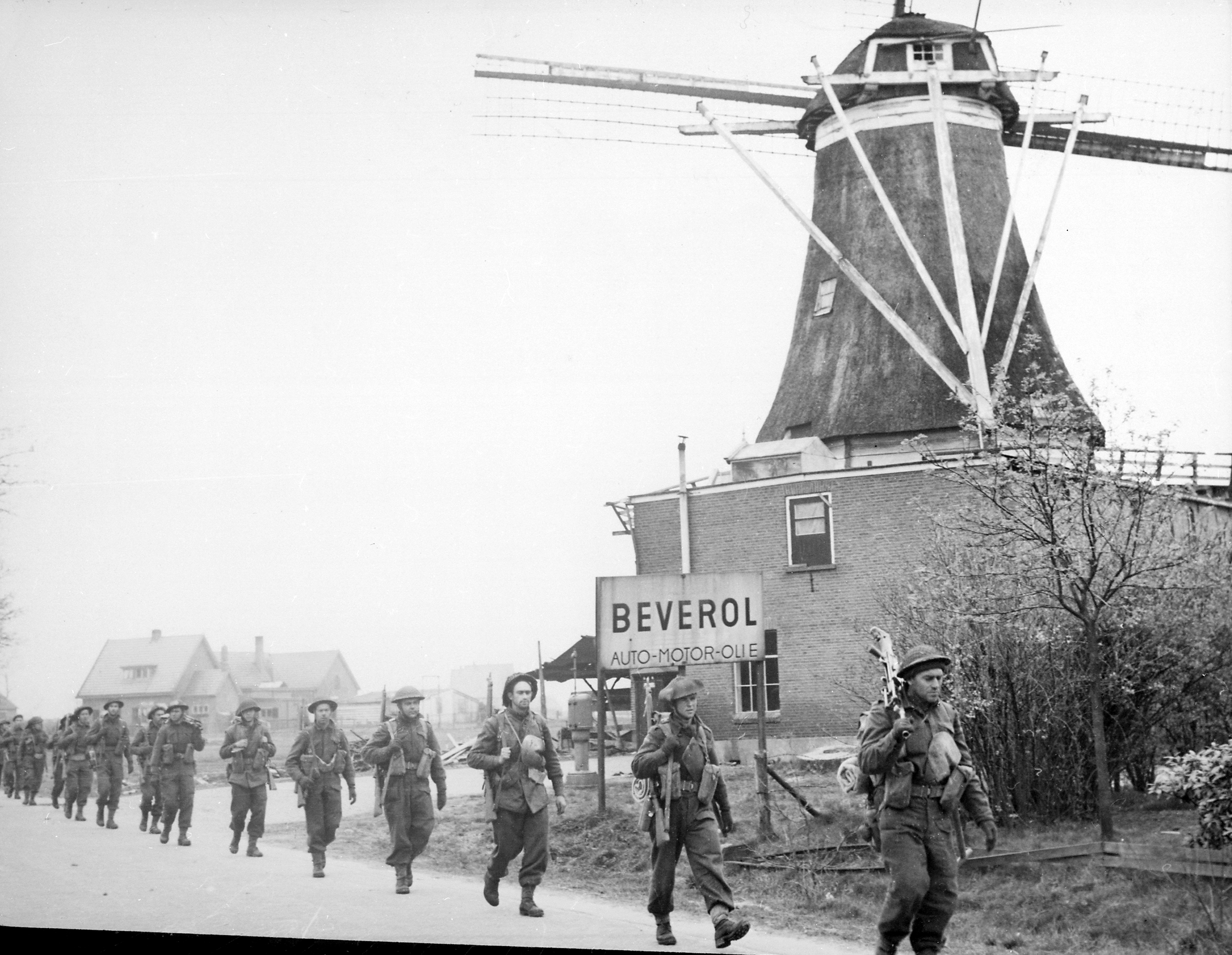
Canadian troops pass a windmill in Rijssen-Holten, April 1945.

In appreciation, the Dutch people sent tens of thousands of tulips (the Dutch national flower) to Ottawa. In the following year, the royal family contributed thousands as well, and a further ten thousand yearly since. The donations became an annual tradition, culminating in the Canadian Tulip Festival. What is now known as the Canadian Tulip Festival at Ottawa's Commissioners Park was originally a gift of 100,000 tulips given by Margriet's mother Crown Princess Juliana, as she then was known, "to mark Canada's contribution to the liberation of the Netherlands and as thanks to Ottawa for sheltering her family during the war."

== State visits ==
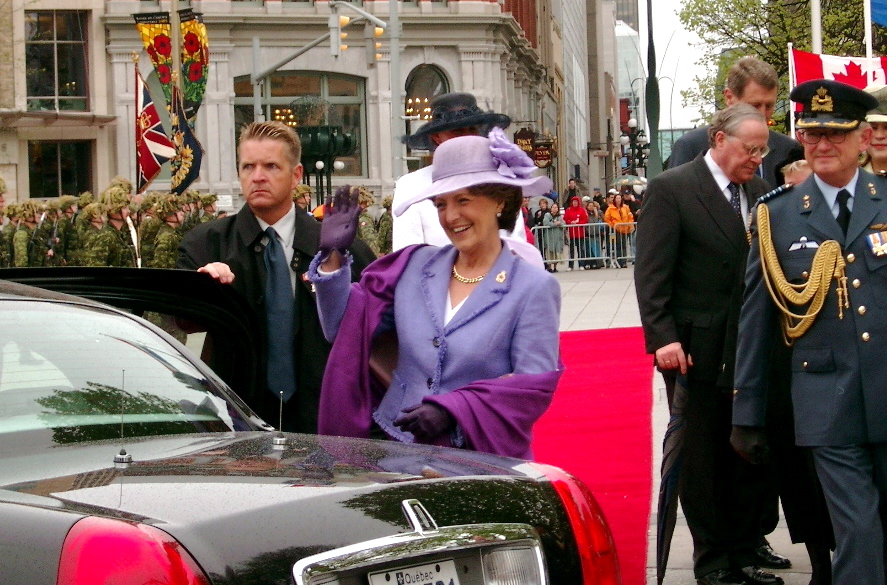
Princess Margriet returns to Ottawa to attend the Canadian Tulip Festival in May 2002.

In May 1967, Queen Juliana of the Netherlands visited Canada. From 9–17 May 1988, Queen Beatrix of the Netherlands and Prince Claus of the Netherlands visited Canada. King Willem-Alexander and Queen Máxima paid a widely publicized state visit to Canada from 27 to 29 May 2015, receiving an extremely warm welcome, particularly in Ontario.

== International cooperation ==
Canada and the Netherlands have worked very closely together on many foreign issues. They are both members of the United Nations (and its Specialized Agencies), the World Trade Organization, Interpol, they are both founding members of the North Atlantic Treaty Organization (NATO), the Euro-Atlantic Partnership Council (EAPC), the Organization for Security and Cooperation in Europe (OSCE), and the Stability Pact for South Eastern Europe. Canada and the Netherlands also work together on such issues as the prohibition and elimination of anti-personnel mines, the control of the proliferation of small arms and light weapons, eradicating the worst forms of child labour, the provision of rapid reaction peacekeeping forces to the United Nations (SHIRBRIG) and regional security issues such as Bosnia (SFOR) and Ethiopia and Eritrea (UNMEE).

== Recent military cooperation ==
The Dutch and Canadian armed forces regularly fought together in the War in Afghanistan until the withdrawal of the Netherlands in 2010.

=== Afghanistan ===
Canada's role in the invasion of Afghanistan was to help train the Afghan National Army and police, facilitate reconstruction, in addition to provide security. However, in 2006, with the situation in Kandahar Province turned increasingly violent, the Canadian Forces participated in several operations and battles. The Royal Canadian Air Force had a major presence in Afghanistan, including three CC-130 Hercules cargo planes, two CP-140 surveillance planes, six CH-47 Chinook transport helicopters, six Mil Mi-8 leased for one year from Skylink Aviation, eight CH-146 Griffon utility helicopters and three CU-170 Unmanned Aerial Vehicle (UAV). The Canadian Army increased its presence with main battle tanks, some ten Leopard C2 and twenty Leopard 2A6M CAN, approximately one hundred LAV III armoured vehicles and used six 155 mm M777 howitzers in Afghanistan.

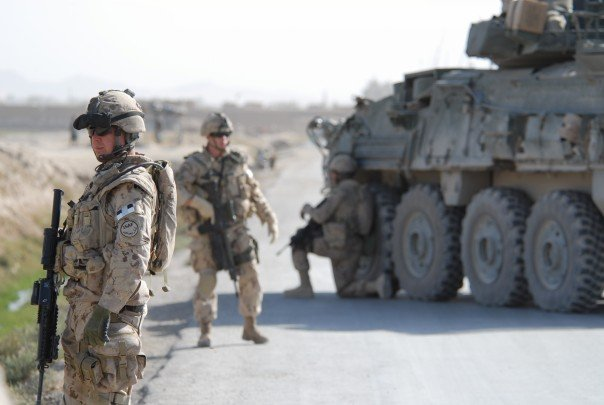
Soldiers from the Canadian Grenadier Guards in Kandahar Province in Afghanistan, pictured, fought with Dutch soldiers against Afghanistan insurgents.

As part of Operation Enduring Freedom, the Netherlands also deployed aircraft as part of the European Participating Air Force (EPAF) in support of ground operations in Afghanistan as well as Dutch naval frigates to police the waters of the Middle East/Indian Ocean. The Netherlands deployed further troops and helicopters to Afghanistan in 2006 as part of a new ISAF security operation in the south of the country. Dutch ground and air forces totalled almost 2,000 personnel during 2006, taking part in combat operations alongside British and Canadian forces as part of NATO's ISAF force in the south. The Netherlands announced in December 2007 that it will begin withdrawing its Dutch Armed Forces troops from Afghanistan, mainly in the province of Uruzgan, in July 2010. "I do not have assurances that other countries will be ready to replace Netherlands troops, but I am certain that Dutch troops will leave in 2010", Foreign Minister Maxime Verhagen said. "I indicated that in writing ... to the NATO secretary general, who has confirmed it." Last minute negotiations in February 2010 after a further NATO request did not change this stance, and there was a handover of command to the United States and Australia on 1 August 2010, formally ending the Dutch military mission, though a redeployment task force would remain for the rest of the year to complete the return of vehicles and other equipment to the Netherlands.

=== Military sales ===
In 2007, the Netherlands sold 100 Leopard tanks to Canada. This include 20 Leopard 2-A6s and 80 Leopard 2-A4s. The agreement was announced during Dutch Defence Minister Eimert van Middelkoop's visit to Canada. As part of the agreement, the Dutch army intended to provide training for Canadian instructors. The Dutch Army also uses the Colt Canada C7 Rifle as their service rifle.

=== Military treaties ===
Canada and the Netherlands have signed two separate treaties to govern and allow for the deployment of soldiers for training and mutual defense, in each other's territory. As NATO allies, under Article 5, Canada considers an attack on the Netherlands to be an attack on Canada and the reverse is true as well. This only applies to actions on European and North American territories north of the Tropic of Cancer, thereby excluding the Caribbean Netherlands, Aruba, Curacao, and Sint Maarten.

== Migration ==
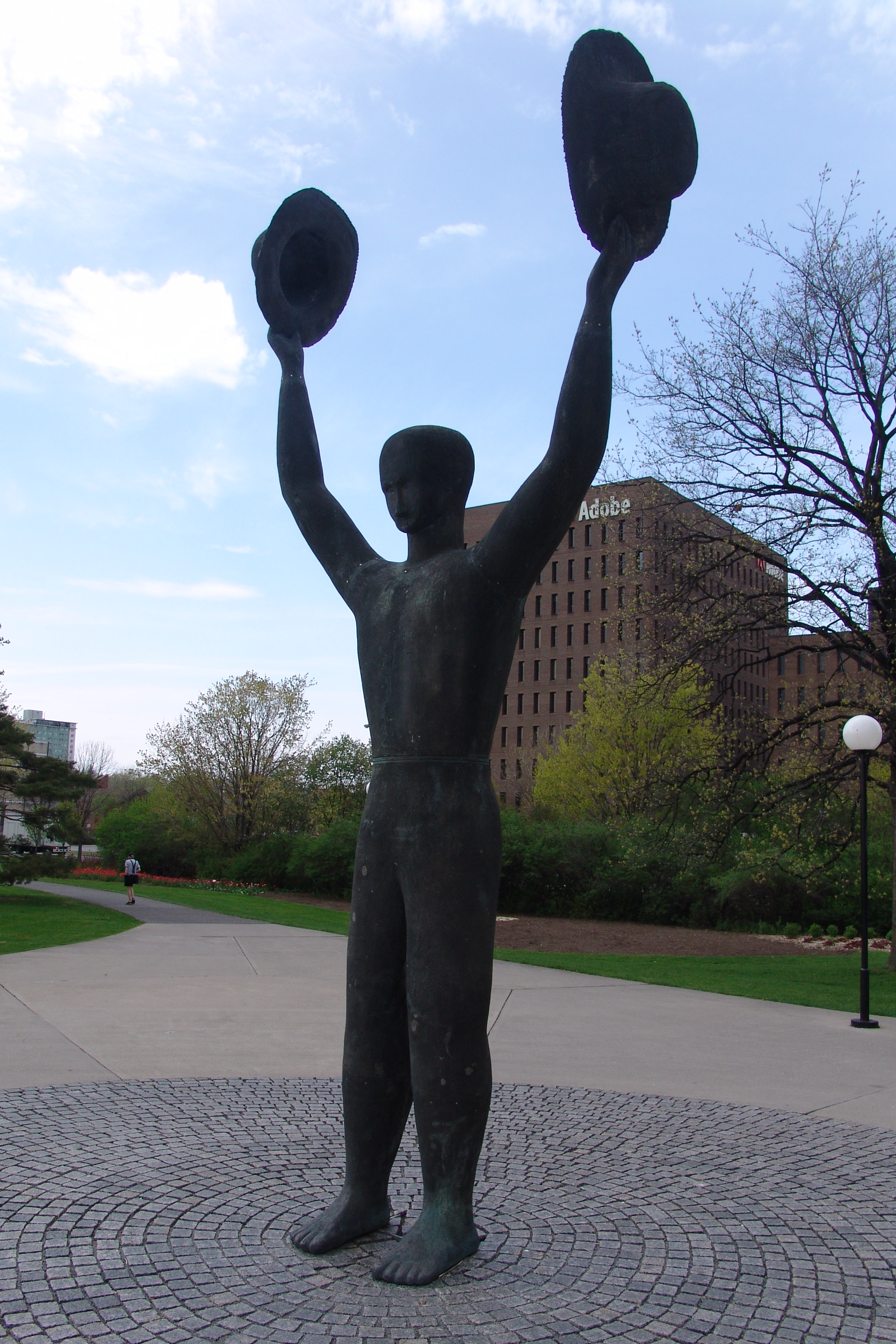
The Man With Two Hats celebrates Canada's assistance to the people of Netherlands and the joy of liberation.

According to the Canada 2006 Census, there are 1,035,965 Canadians of Dutch descent, including those of full or partial ancestry. Over 400,000 people of Dutch origin are permanent residents of Canada and in 1996 (the last census figures available) 124,545 residents of Canada were listed as being born in the Netherlands: 0.4 percent of the Canadian population. The Dutch Language is the 7th most spoken language in Canada. It is also the third most spoken language in Prince Edward Island.

Of all immigrant groups in Canada, those who are Dutch-speaking have shown a preference for farming that exceeds all other major groups. The capital and expertise they bring have made a substantial contribution to agriculture in Canada. Most Dutch immigrants settle in Ontario. Ontario has the lion's share of all Dutch immigrant farmers in Canada, with 58%. Alberta and British Columbia have similar proportions: 18% and 14% respectively. The Dutch represent a significant proportion of immigrants in the Atlantic provinces.

The Dutch are world leaders in greenhouse technologies and many have brought their expertise to Canada. Thirty percent of all immigrant-run green-house operations have Dutch immigrants at the helm in Canada. Just under one-quarter of all immigrant nursery operators are Dutch.

According to the Canadian Embassy in The Hague, between 4500 and 5000 Canadians live in the Netherlands.

In London, Ontario the Dutch Canadian Society runs the Dutch Canadian Club one of the most popular clubs in that city.

== Trade ==
In 2006, the Netherlands were the 8th ranked destination for Canadian exports (0.7%). Canada and the Netherlands enjoy a mature relationship based on political, investment, trade, and historical ties. To foster business and commercial relations between the Netherlands and Canada, the Dutch business community set up the Netherlands-Canadian Chamber of Commerce.

In 2017, free trade between Canada and the Netherlands began for the first time. This led to a sharp increase in trade. After the UK and Italy, the Netherlands saw the most growth in trade relations with Canada. By 2018, the value of Dutch exports to Canada reached €4.4 billion, the value of Dutch imports from Canada reached €3.1 billion.

== Travel and tourism ==
The Netherlands remains a top European destination for Canadian tourists, especially those 45 years old or younger.

In June 2019, it was announced that by early 2020, there could be passport free travel between the two countries. As a result of the COVID-19 pandemic, these efforts were postponed indefinitely, as international travel declined dramatically.

The Known Traveler Digital Identity is a joint venture between the governments of Canada and the Netherlands, and will be tested first on travelers going between those countries. The plan is to have it ready for a wider global rollout by 2020. The program will allow people to cross borders faster if they create a digital profile filled with their personal information on their mobile devices.

Air Canada, Air Transat and KLM operate flights between the two countries.

== Youth exchange ==
Canada and the Netherlands offer special working visas to youth from each country. However, these special visa policies have conditions: Dutch youth must have a job offer before the visa is granted and Canadian youth must agree to limits of how long they can remain in the Netherlands. Citizens of the Netherlands and Canada between the ages of 18 and 25 are eligible and there are no restrictions for applicants status (non-students are equally eligible).

== Resident diplomatic missions ==
- Canada has an embassy in The Hague.
- Netherlands has an embassy in Ottawa and consulates-general in Toronto and Vancouver.

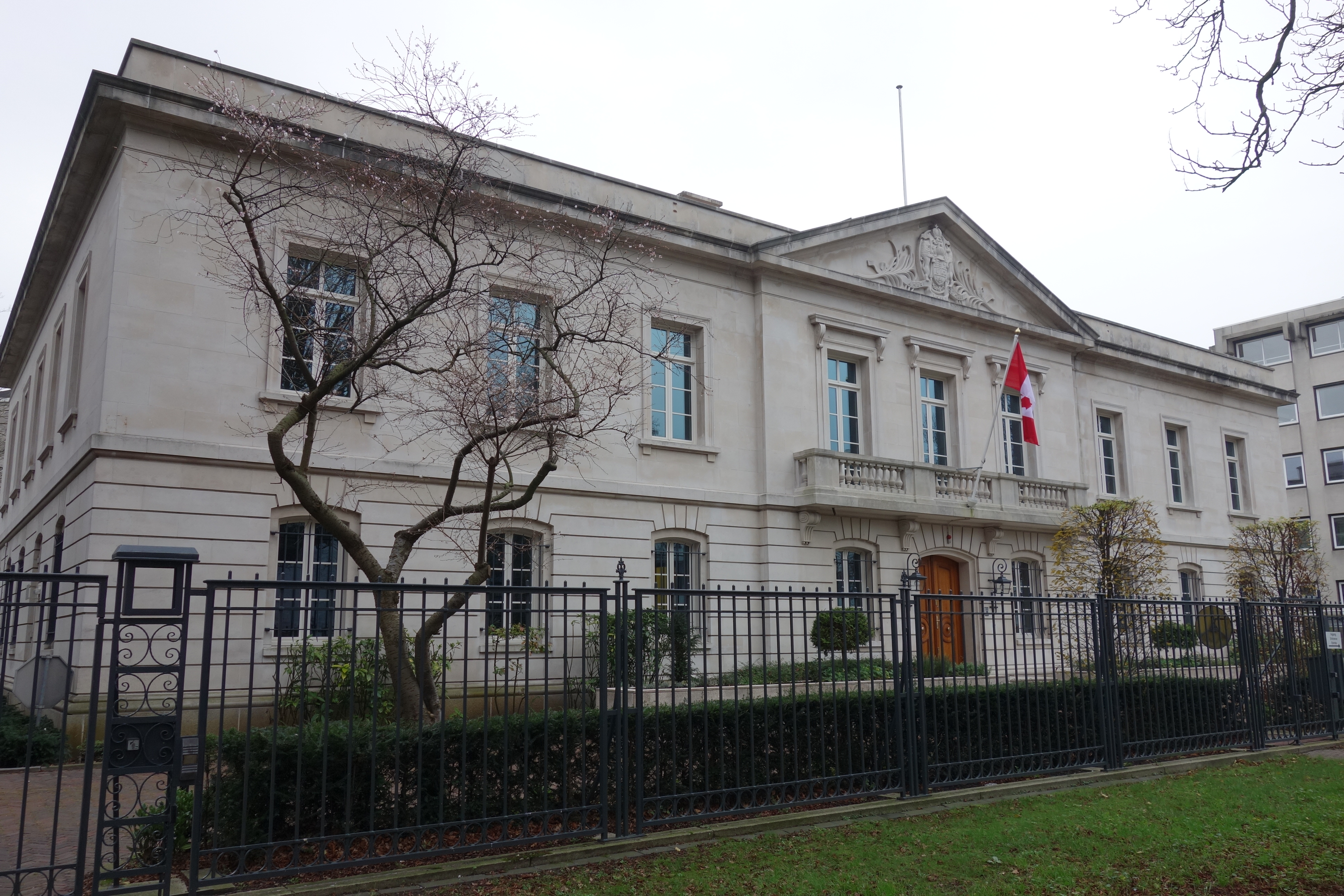
Embassy of Canada in The Hague

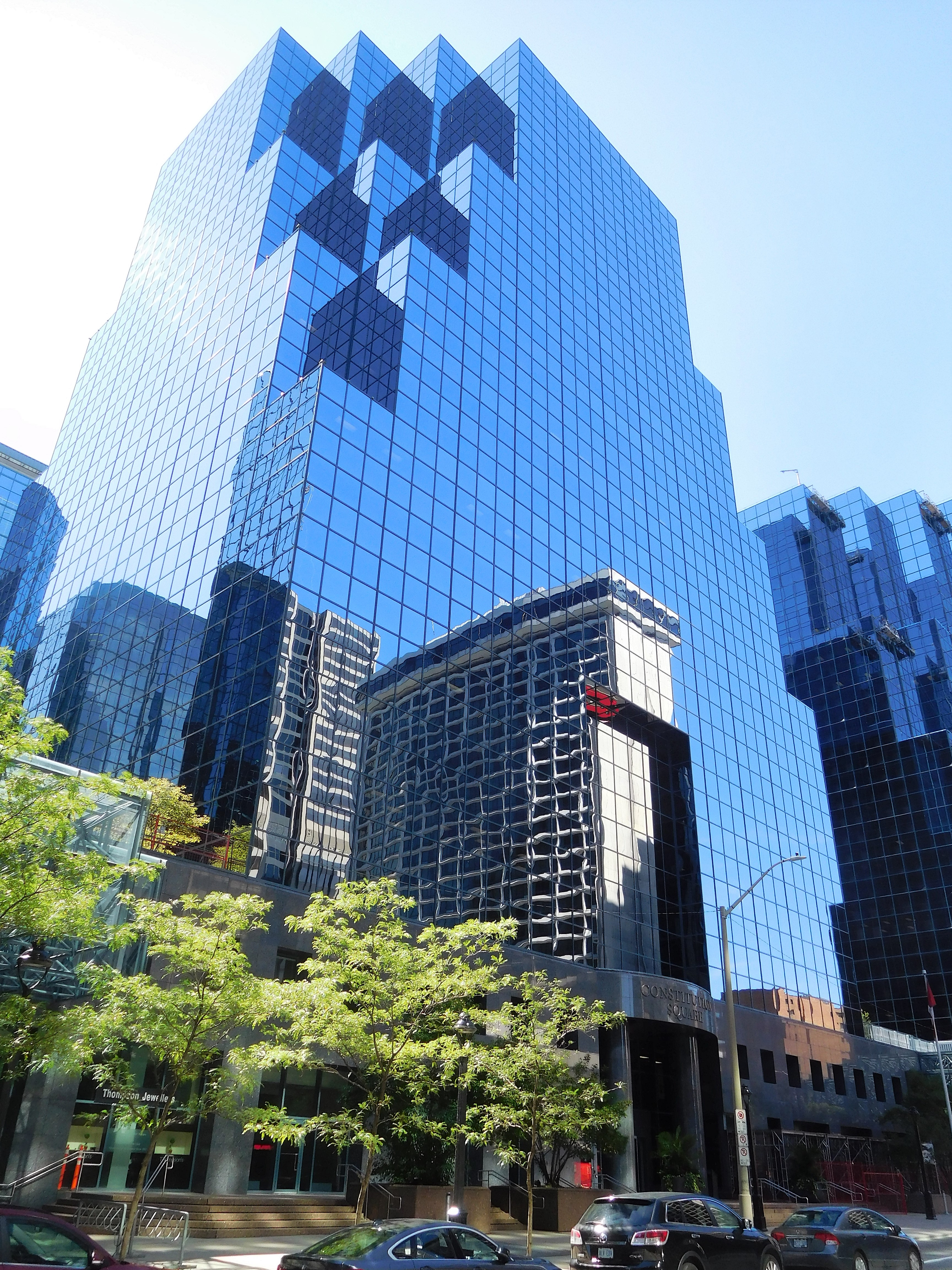
Building hosting the Embassy of the Netherlands in Ottawa

== See also ==
- Foreign relations of Canada
- Foreign relations of Netherlands
- Canada-EU relations
- NATO-EU relations
- Comprehensive Economic and Trade Agreement
- Dutch Canadians
