= Edmonton Dutch Canadian Centre =

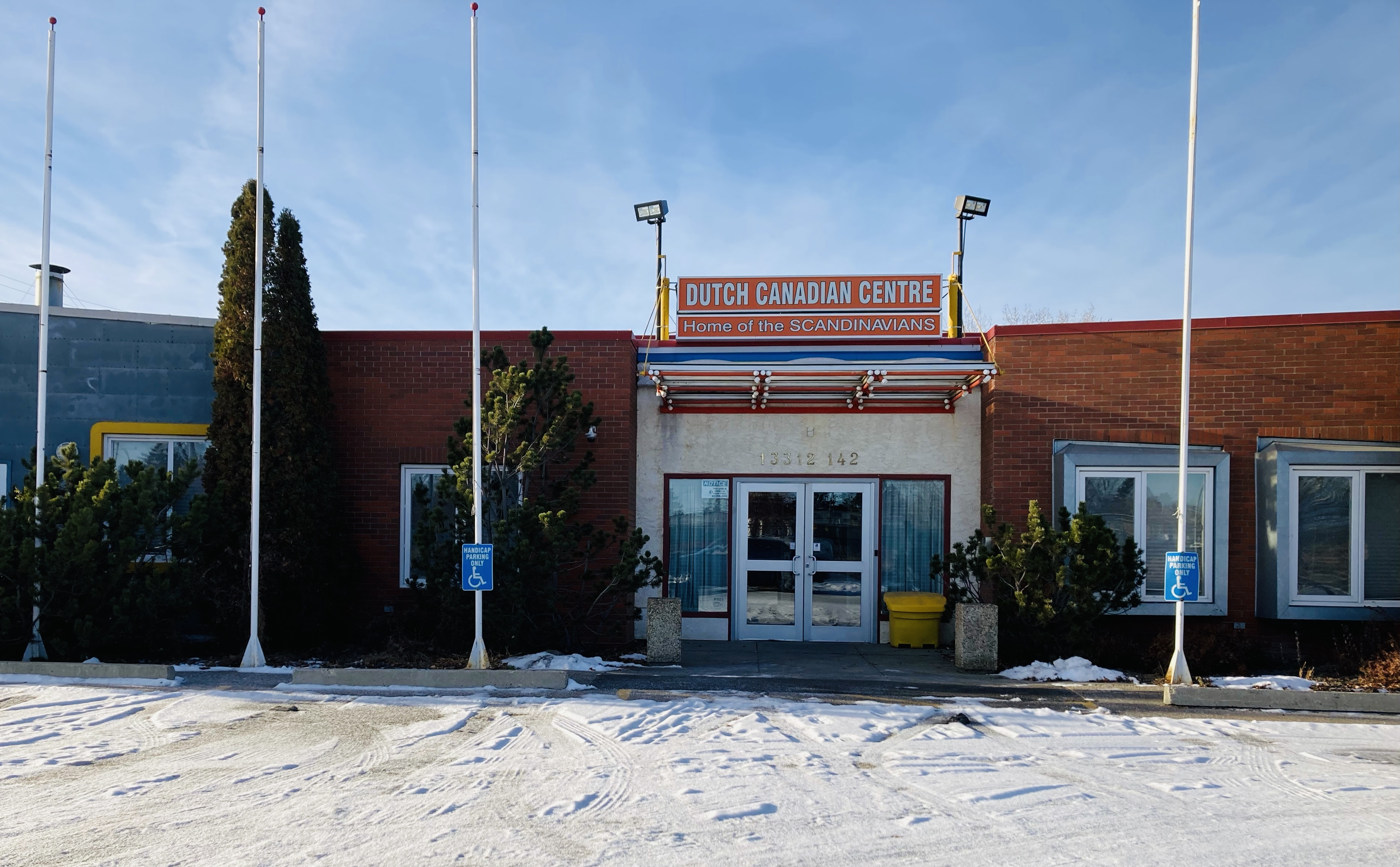
- Dutch Canadian Centre in 2023
- Alternative names: Dutch Canadian Club

General information
- Type: Social club
- Location: 53°35′40.28″N 113°33′59.77″W, 13312 142 St NW; Edmonton, AB T5L 4T3, Canada
- Year built: 1971
- Owner: Dutch Canadian Club of Edmonton

Height
- Roof: Flat roof

Technical details
- Floor area: 1404 m^{2}
- Grounds: 0.81 hectares (2.0 acres)

Other information
- Public transit: Edmonton Transit System

Website
- http://dutchcanadiancentre.com/

The Dutch Canadian Centre of Edmonton is a social and cultural organization that brings together people in the Edmonton, Alberta area who have an interest in Dutch culture, heritage, and community. The Edmonton Dutch Canadian Centre aims to foster connections among individuals of Dutch descent or those who have an affinity for Dutch culture.

== History ==
The Dutch Canadian Club of Edmonton is a social and cultural organization that brings together people in the Edmonton, Alberta area who have an interest in Dutch culture, heritage, and community. The Edmonton Dutch Canadian Centre aims to foster connections among individuals of Dutch descent or those who have an affinity for Dutch culture.

In late August 1995, Edmonton's Dutch Canadian Centre building burned down.

== Organization ==
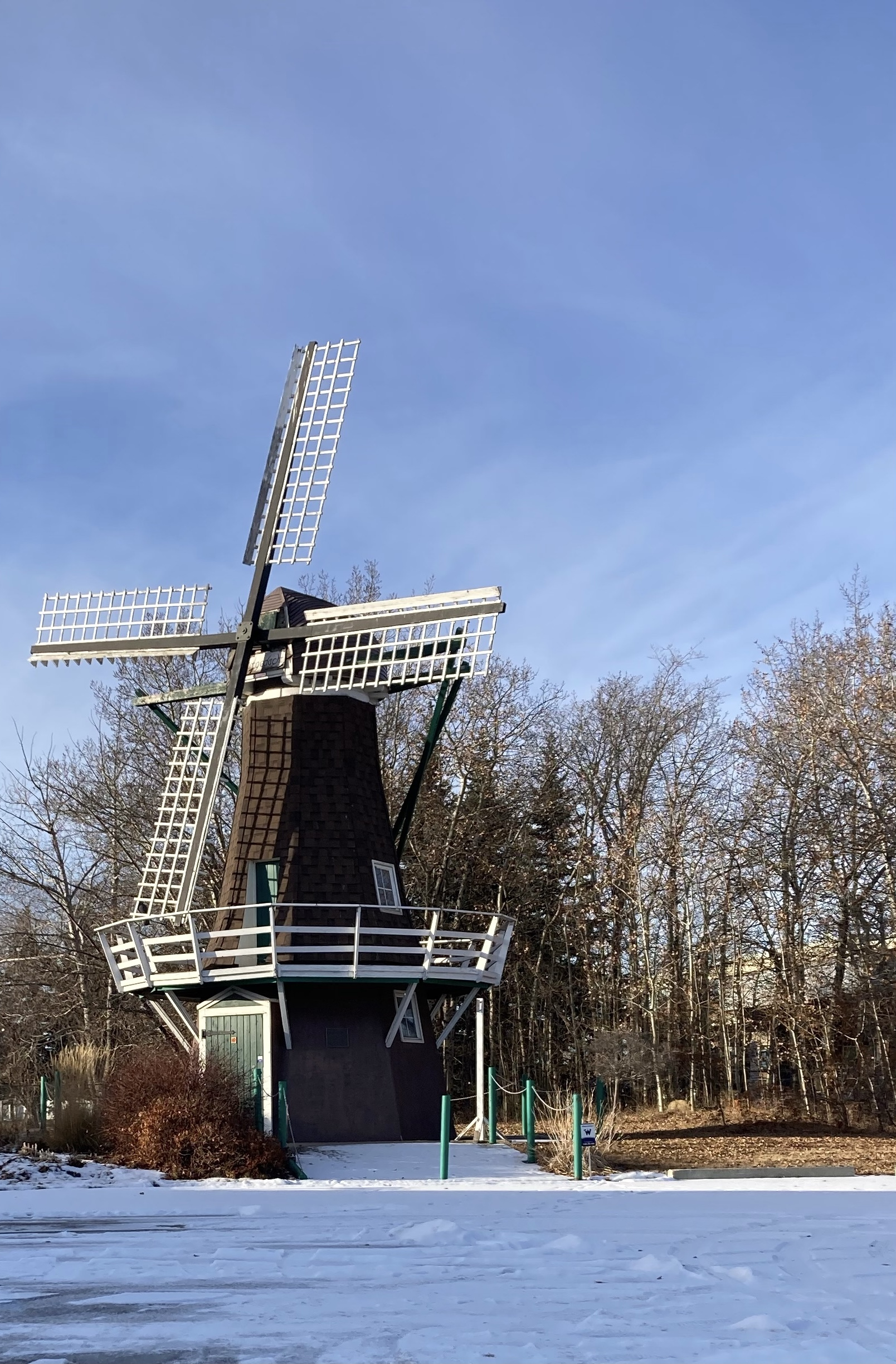
Edmonton's Dutch Canadian Centre features a large model windmill

Key aspects of organizations like the Dutch Canadian Club of Edmonton include:

- Cultural Events: The club organizes and participates in cultural events that celebrate Dutch traditions, holidays, and customs. This includes festivals, gatherings, and themed activities, such as at the Edmonton Heritage Festival.
- Community Building: The club provides a platform for people with a Dutch background or an interest in Dutch culture to connect, share experiences, and build a sense of community.
- Language and Heritage Preservation: The Dutch Canadian Centre has numerous initiatives to preserve and promote the Dutch language and heritage, especially among younger generations.
- Social Activities: In addition to cultural events, the club hosts social activities such as dinners, dances, or outings, providing members with opportunities to socialize and network.
- Supporting Newcomers: Edmonton's Dutch Canadian Centre serves as a support network for newcomers or individuals who are exploring or reconnecting with their Dutch heritage.

== Notable projects ==
In 2020, Edmonton's Dutch Canadian Centre announced that they would be unveiling a statue of Anne Frank in Light Horse Park in the Edmonton neighborhood of Old Strathcona. The statue unveiling was delayed due to the COVID-19 pandemic, and the statue was eventually installed and revealed to the public during a ceremony in 2021.

== See also ==
- Demographics of Edmonton
- Dutch Canadians
