= Christian Courier (Canada) =

Canadian monthly Christian newspaper

- Cover of 6 November 2023 issue
- Type: Monthly newspaper
- Editor-in-chief: Meghan Kort, Maaike VanderMeer
- Founded: August 1945; 81 years ago
- Language: English
- Country: Canada
- ISSN: 1192-3415
- Website: www.christiancourier.ca

The Christian Courier is a Canadian monthly Christian newspaper co-edited by Meghan Kort and Maaike VanderMeer.

The periodical was established in August 1945 as the Canadian Calvinist, an English-language publication targeted at Dutch Canadians. Paul De Koekkoek was the founding editor. In 1951 it merged with Contact (a Dutch-language newspaper which had started in 1949) to become Calvinist Contact. Calvinist Contact was all in Dutch and this gradually developed to be all in English by 1983. It adopted its current name in 1992. At this point the circulation was 5,000, down from a peak of 10,000 in the 1970s. As of 2015, it had 2,100 print subscribers. In 2026, Christian Courier has 1,500 print subscribers in Canada and the U.S.A.

Christian Courier is a non-profit news organization. It was originally bimonthly, changed to weekly in 1954, and monthly in 2020. It has roots in the Christian Reformed Church community, and historically reported on issues such as trade unions, Christian education, and women in office. It is independent of any denomination but keeps its reformed roots.
