= Tiago Codinha =

Canadian soccer player (born 2005)

Personal information
- Date of birth: March 9, 2005 (age 21)
- Place of birth: Hilversum, Netherlands
- Height: 1.84 m (6 ft 1/2 in)
- Position: Midfielder

Team information
- Current team: Volendam
- Number: 19

Youth career
- –2015: SDO Bussum
- 2015–2020: BFC Bussum
- 2020–2023: FC Utrecht
- 2023–2025: FC Twente/Heracles
- 2025–: Volendam

Senior career*
Years	Team	Apps	(Gls)
2026–	Volendam	2	(0)

International career^{‡}
2024	Canada U20	2	(0)
- * Club domestic league appearances and goals as of February 13, 2026 ‡ National team caps and goals as of February 25, 2024

Tiago Codinha (born March 9, 2005) is a professional soccer player who plays for Dutch Eerste Divisie club Volendam. Born in the Netherlands, he represented Canada at youth international level.

== Early life ==
Codinha played youth soccer with SDO Bussum, later joining BFC Bussum in 2015, before joining the youth system of FC Utrecht in 2020. In June 2023, he joined the youth system of FC Twente/Heracles (the two clubs share an academy system). He became captain of the youth side, also making the Heracles first team bench for three times during the 2024–25 season, but failing to make an appearance. In 2025, he joined the Volendam system.

== Club career ==
On January 24, 2026, Codinha made his professional debut with Volendam, in an Eredivisie match, against Ajax.

== International career ==
Codinha was born in the Netherlands, to a Canadian-born father of Portuguese descent. He holds Canadian, Dutch and Portuguese citizenship.

In February 2024, he was called up to the Canada U20 for the 2024 CONCACAF U-20 Championship qualifying tournament.

== Career statistics ==
As of February 13, 2026

Club	Season	League			Domestic Cup		Other		Total	
Club	Season	Division	Apps	Goals	Apps	Goals	Apps	Goals	Apps	Goals
Volendam	2025–26	Eredivisie	2	0	1	0	—		3	0
Career total			2	0	1	0	0	0	3	0
