= Stephen de Boer =

Canadian diplomat and lawyer

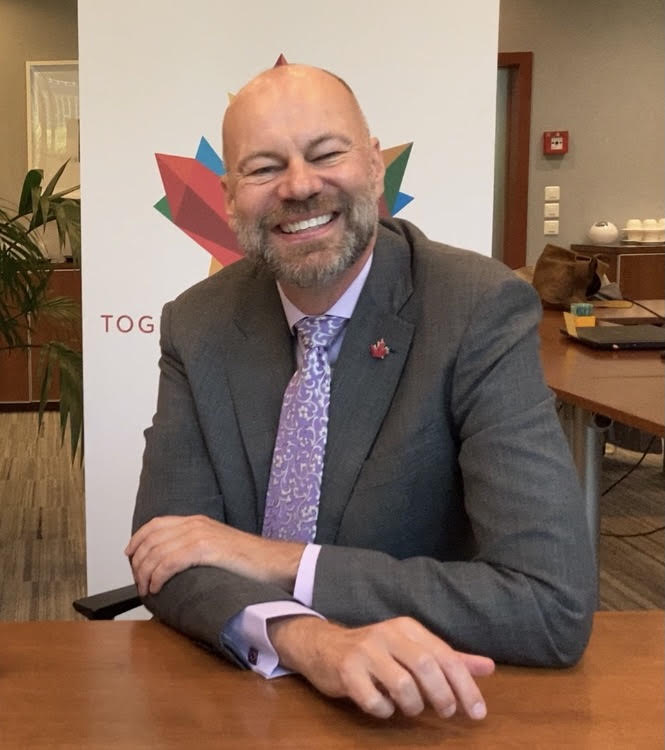
Stephen de Boer

Stephen de Boer is a Canadian is a trade expert, diplomat, environmental negotiator and trained lawyer. He was Canada's Permanent Representative to the World Trade Organization in Geneva, Switzerland.

== Early life ==
He was born in Clinton, Ontario and is the third of four children belonging to Dutch immigrants.

== Education ==
de Boer attended The University of Western Ontario, where he obtained a B.A in Political Science (1986), and Bachelor of Laws (1989). He completed his Master of Laws (LL.M) at Georgetown University in 1991, specializing in international and comparative law.

== Career ==
de Boer began working for Global Affairs Canada (GAC) in 2005, where he has served as Deputy Director of Investment Trade Policy, and Deputy Director of North American Trade Policy. In 2006, he served as Director of Global Affairs Canada's Softwood Lumber Division. In 2008, he was appointed as Director of the Oceans and Environmental Law Division. When Canada entered into the UNFCCC's international climate change negotiations, de Boer became Director General and Deputy Chief Negotiator for Climate Change International (CCI) for Environment Canada. In 2013, he returned to Global Affairs Canada as Director General for the Trade Controls Bureau responsible for administering the Export and Import Permits Act (EIPA). This role involved regulation of trade in military and strategic dual-use goods, implementation of trade restrictions in support of Canada's supply management programs, and protection of vulnerable Canadian industries. de Boer's first ambassadorial posting was to the Republic of Poland and Republic of Belarus in 2015. From August 2017 to August 2022, he served as Canada's Ambassador and Permanent Representative to the World Trade Organization in Geneva, Switzerland. From 2022 to 2023, he was Assistant Deputy Minister for the International Affairs Branch of Environment and Climate Change Canada. In 2023, he became the Foreign and Defence Policy Advisor to the Prime Minister of Canada.

=== Academic career and publications ===
de Boer has taught courses in regional trade arrangements (Case Western Reserve University in Cleveland, Ohio), business and government (York University), and international trade topics and climate change law and policy (Western University). His papers include "Trading Culture: The Canada-US Magazine Dispute" in Dispute Settlement in the WTO: Issues and Practice Magazine(1998); "Commodity or Drug: Legal Aspects of International of International Trade in Tobacco Products. Lessons on the Application of Article XX of the GATT in Environmental Matters" published in "Environmental Policy: From Regulation to Economic Instruments (2002)"; and "Canadian Provinces, US States and North American Integration: Bench Warmers or Key Players?" for the Institute for Research on Public Policy (2002).
