= Canadian Tulip Festival =

Annual tulip festival in Ottawa, Ontario, Canada

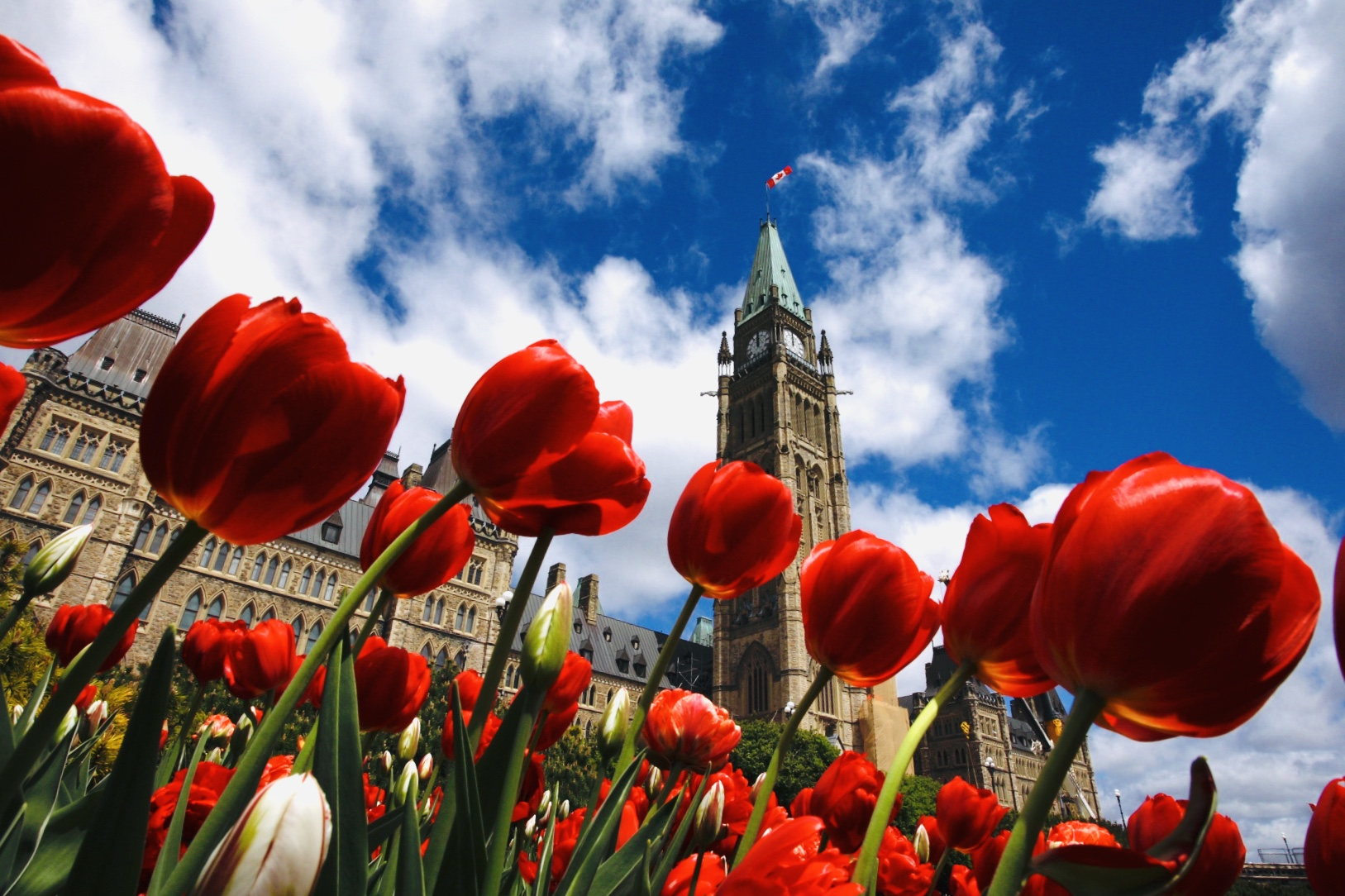
- Tulips at Parliament Hill in 2019
- Genre: Horticultural
- Dates: 2 weeks leading through Victoria Day
- Locations: Ottawa, National Capital Region, Ontario, Canada
- Years active: 1953 – present
- Website: tulipfestival.ca

The Canadian Tulip Festival (French: Festival Canadien des Tulipes; Dutch: Canadees Festival van de Tulp) is a tulip festival held annually each May in Ottawa, Ontario, Canada. The festival claims to be the world's largest tulip festival, displaying over one million tulips, with attendance of over 650,000 visitors annually. Large displays of tulips are planted throughout the city, the largest of which are often in Commissioners Park on the shores of Dow's Lake, and along the Rideau Canal with 300,000 tulips planted there alone.

The festival is a cultural and historical aspect of the special Canada–Netherlands relationship, having originated with commemorative donations of tulips to Canada from the Netherlands for Canadian actions during World War II, when Canadian forces led the liberation of the Netherlands and hosted the Dutch royal family in exile. The Netherlands continues to send 20,000 bulbs to Canada each year (10,000 from the royal family and 10,000 from the Dutch Bulb Growers Association).

== History ==
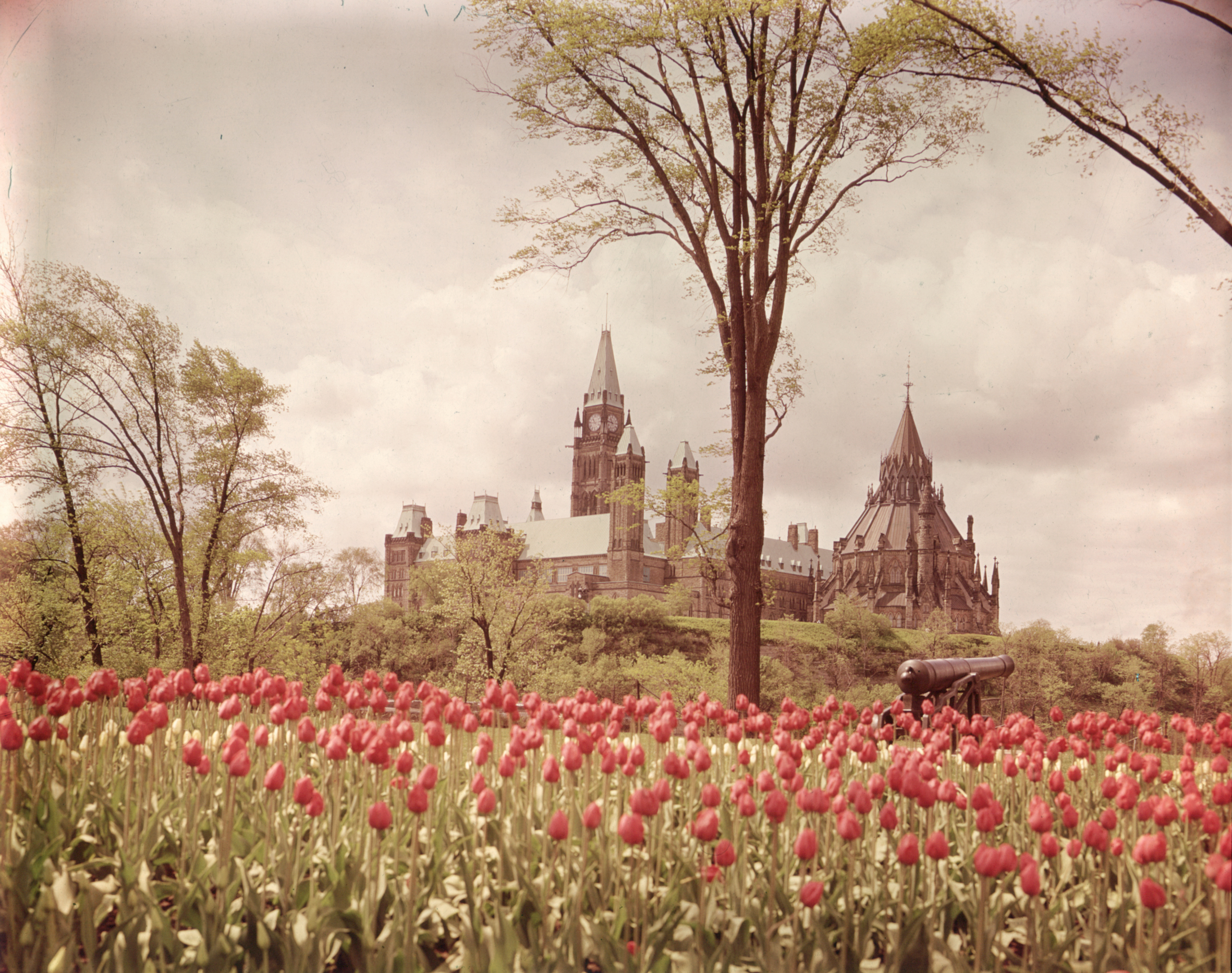
Red tulips blooming (1952)

During World War II, Seymour Cobley of the Royal Horticultural Society donated 83,000 tulips to Canada from 1941 to 1943 to honour Canadian involvement in the war. However, his donation is not known to have resulted in any major events or festivals.

In 1945, the Dutch royal family sent 100,000 tulip bulbs to Ottawa in gratitude for Canadians having sheltered the future Queen Juliana and her family for the preceding three years during the Nazi occupation of the Netherlands. The most noteworthy event during their time in Canada was the birth in 1943 of Princess Margriet at the Ottawa Civic Hospital. The maternity ward was temporarily declared to be extraterritorial by the Canadian government, thereby allowing Princess Margriet's citizenship to be solely influenced by her mother's Dutch citizenship. In 1946, Juliana sent another 20,500 bulbs requesting that a display be created for the hospital, and promised to send 10,000 more bulbs each year. By 1963 the festival featured more than 2 million tulips, rising to nearly 3 million by 1995.

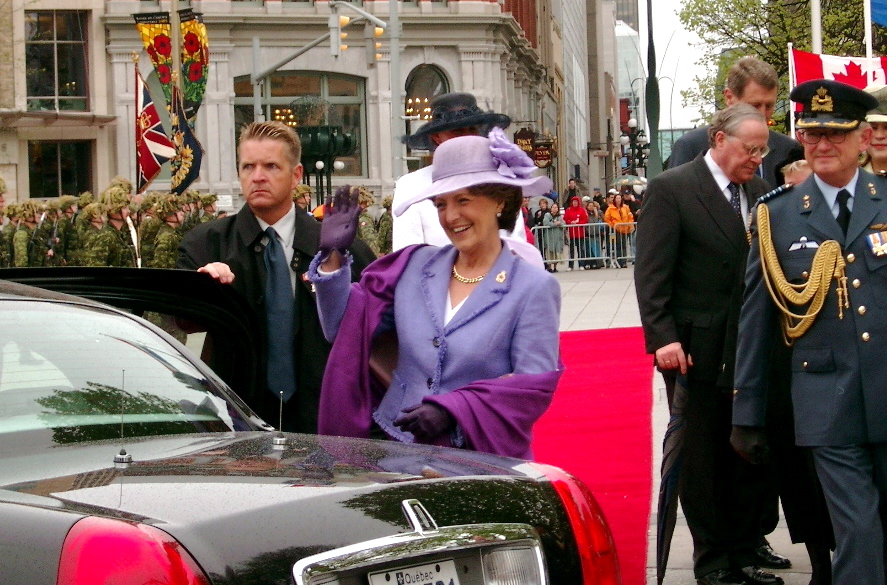
Princess Margriet of the Netherlands attending the Canadian Tulip Festival (May 2002)

In the years following Queen Juliana's original donation, Ottawa became famous for its tulips and in 1953 the Ottawa Board of Trade and photographer Malak Karsh organized the first "Canadian Tulip Festival". Queen Juliana returned to celebrate the festival in 1967, and Princess Margriet returned in 2002 to celebrate the 50th anniversary of the festival.

For many years, the festival featured a series of outdoor music concerts in addition to the tulips. The 1972 festival saw Liberace give an opening concert, and at the 1987 festival, Canadian singer Alanis Morissette made her first appearance at the age of 12. The Trews first became widely known after opening for Big Sugar at the 2003 festival. Montreal's General Rudie also gained exposure early in their career with a performance at the 2000 festival.

For a dozen years between 1994 and 2006, the Canadian Tulip Festival celebrated countries all across the world who have also adopted the tulip as a symbol of international friendship.

In the early 2000s, the festival became less focused on tulips, with more emphasis placed on other attractions such as the concerts and a crafts fair. Additionally, weather over the past years had affected admissions and ticket sales; when poor weather and low ticket sales for a performance by The Guess Who in 2003 made the festival lose an estimated $100,000, later concerts featured less-prominent bands, but these led to even lower ticket sales due to audiences' unfamiliarity with them, only lowered by worsening weather. In October 2006 the festival filed for bankruptcy. Despite a bailout of $75,000 from the city, in 2006 the festival had only $65,000 against debts of $750,000. To rescue the festival, David Luxton, CEO of Ottawa-based explosive detection systems manufacturer Allen-Vanguard, purchased the debt to allow it to reorganize.

In 2007, the festival was reorganised under new leadership. Park admission charges were eliminated and a new feature called Celebridée: a Celebration of Ideas was introduced. Another component of the 2007 festival was a fund-raising effort in support of War Child Canada. Celebridée continued to grow since its inception in 2007. 2008's speakers included Sir Salman Rushdie, Wired's Chris Anderson, author Jared Diamond, and pianist Angela Hewitt.

In 2019, the festival once again changed leadership and management, into the hands of a younger board and management team. The goal of this team was to "Re-Root" the festival in its history and horticulture. The festival was returned to a single site at Commissioners Park, with a Veterans Day ceremony at Beechwood Cemetery.

=== 75th Anniversary of the Liberation of the Netherlands ===
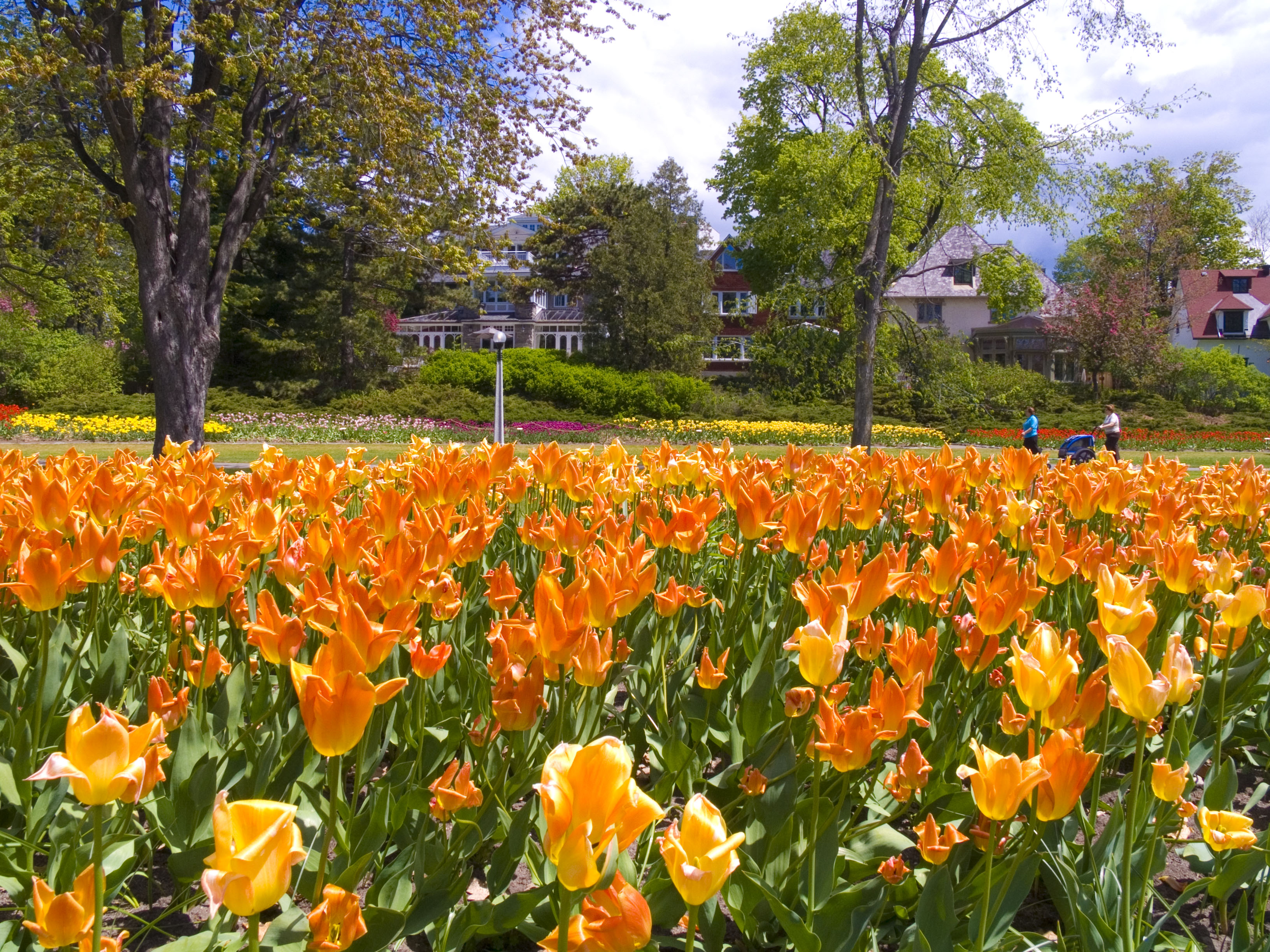
Crown-shaped orange Liberation75-tulips for the 75th Anniversary of the Liberation of the Netherlands, formerly known as the Orange Emperor variety (2005)

In 2020, the planned celebrations for the 75th Anniversary of the Liberation of the Netherlands were conducted virtually due to the COVID-19 pandemic, using aerial photography and 360-degree image captures to display the tulips. As part of the Liberation75 commemoration campaign, 1.1 million orange crown-shaped Liberation75 tulips (formerly known as the Orange Emperor variety), in addition to the deep red Canadian Liberator tulips, were sent from growers in the Netherlands and planted across Canada to honour the 1.1 million Canadians, who served during World War II.

== Sites ==
- Commissioners Park
- Beechwood National Military Cemetery

=== Attraction sites ===
- National Gallery of Canada
- Royal Canadian Mint
- Library and Archives Canada
- Canadian War Museum

== Themes ==
- 1994: A Tribute to the Origin Country of the Tulip - Turkey
- 1995: The Friendship That Flowered - 50th anniversary of the Liberation of the Netherlands
- 1996: Floral Tribute to Nice
- 1997: Floral Artistry of Japan
- 1998: A Celebration of Canada's Provinces and Territories
- 1999: Between Friends
- 2000: Tulips 2000: A Capital Celebration!
- 2001: Tulips Forever! A Salute to Britain
- 2002: Tulipmania! 50th Anniversary
- 2003: G'day Australia – Tulips Down Under
- 2004: Canada's Tulip Experience
- 2005: A Celebration of Peace and Friendship
- 2006: Tulips 2006 – World Flower Rendezvous!
- 2007: "CelebrIDÉE A Celebration of Ideas" inaugural year
- 2008: Where Ideas Bloom
- 2009: The Tulip Route
- 2010: "Liberation" - The 65th anniversary of the liberation of Europe
- 2011: "Kaleidoscope" - A celebration of Spring awakening through colour, culture and community
- 2012: The Festival celebrates its 60th anniversary with “60 years of Tulip Friendship”.
- 2013: “Cirque de Liberation”
- 2014: “Floral Extravaganza”
- 2015: “Tulip Liberation” celebrates the 70th Anniversary of the Liberation of Holland through colour, culture and community!
- 2016: "Urban Tulip" - at Aberdeen Pavilion
- 2017: “One Tulip – One Canada” The Festival's 65th edition takes place during Canada's 150th
- 2018: "A World of Tulips"
- 2019: ReRooted
- 2020: Liberation75 (Held Online during CoVid19)
- 2021: Liberation 75+1 and Rembrandt & Dutch Masters
- 2022: 70th Anniversary
- 2023: The Canadian Tulip Legacy
- 2024: Royal Canadian Air Force Centennial Celebrations
- 2025: Celebrating 80 Years of Liberation with the Canadian Army
- 2026: (no specific theme)

== See also ==
- Liberation Day (The Netherlands)
- Canada–Netherlands relations
- National Tulip Day in The Netherlands
- National Canadian Liberation Monument
