= Edmonton Christian High School =

10-12 school in Edmonton, Alberta (est. 1965)

Coordinates: 53.554°N 113.568°W

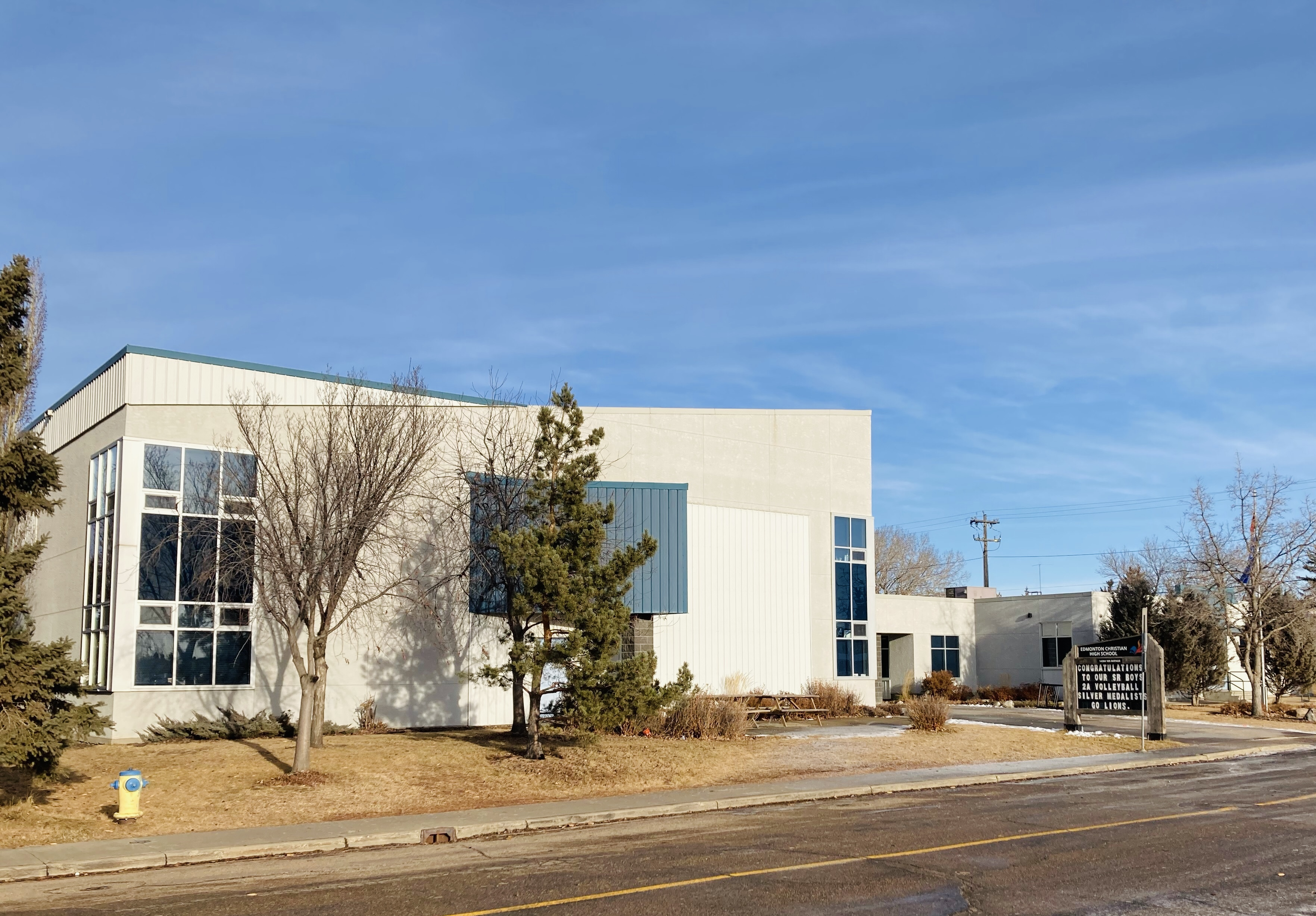
- Edmonton Christian High School in 2023

Location
- 14304 109 Ave NW, Edmonton, AB T5N 1H6

Information
- Established: 1965

Edmonton Christian High School is a Christian high school (grades 10–12) in Edmonton, Alberta, operated by the Edmonton Society for Christian Education, and established in 1965. ECHS provides Christ-centred education from students grade 10–12. Edmonton Christian High School is a sister school to Edmonton Christian Northeast School and Edmonton Christian West School.

== History ==
The school was built in 1965 next to Edmonton Christian West School, and offered education up to Grade 11, which was extended to Grade 12 in 1969.

== Programs Offered ==
Core Subjects include- Religious Studies, Math, Social Studies, English, Science, Biology, Chemistry, Physics and Physical Education (It is required for all students in grade 10 to take Physical Education during grade 10.) Electives include- French, Music, Leadership, Drama, Art, Physical Education (grade 10. 11 and 12), and CTS courses.

== Size ==
Edmonton Christian High School is populated by approximately 300 students.
