= National Canadian Liberation Monument =

Second World War monument in Apeldoorn, Netherlands

Coordinates: 52.2270°N 5.9461°E

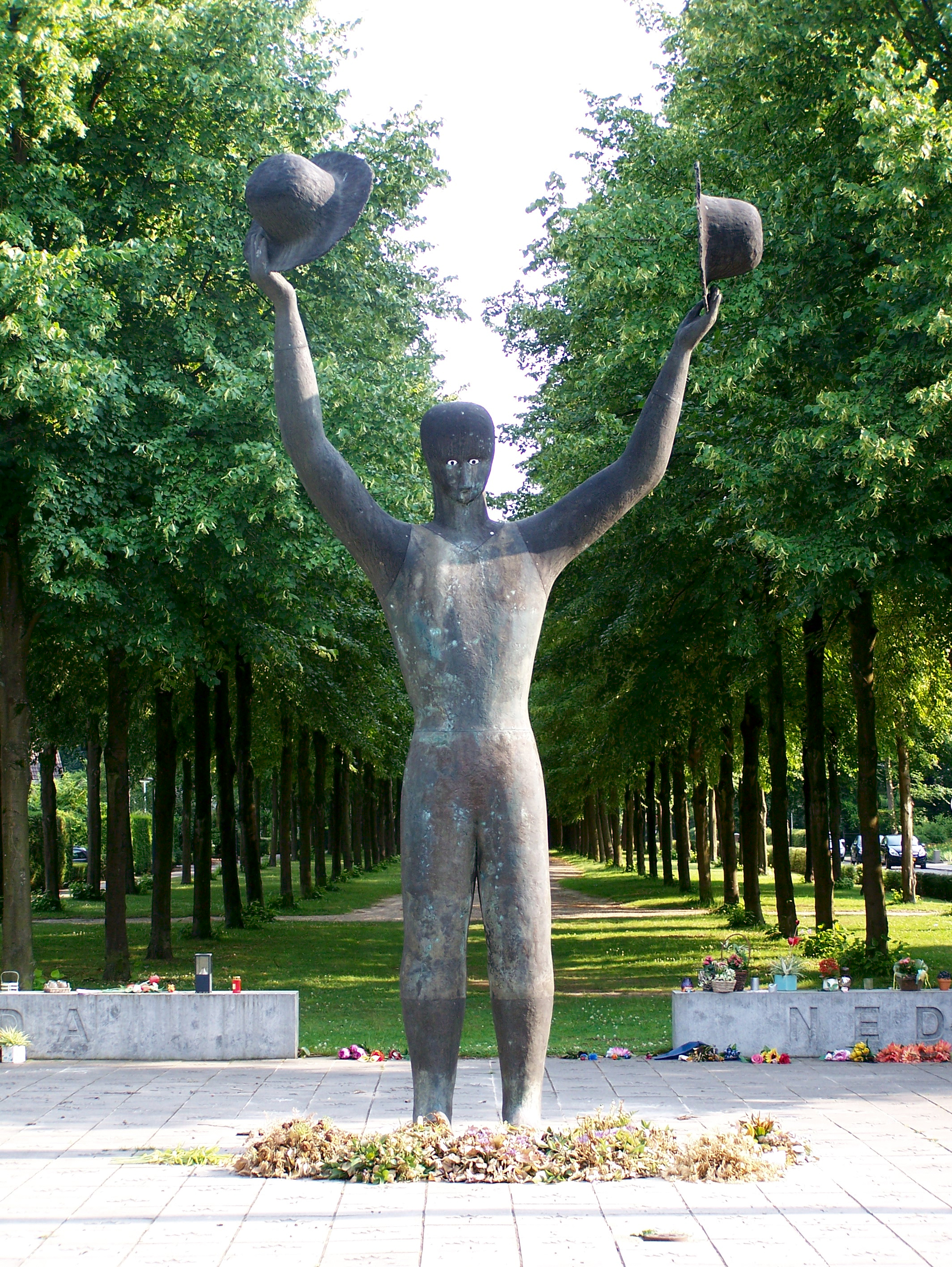

The National Canadian Liberation Monument (Dutch language: Nationaal Canadees Bevrijdingsmonument) is a Second World War monument in Apeldoorn, Netherlands, honouring the liberation of the Netherlands. It was unveiled on 5 May 2000 by Princess Margriet of the Netherlands. It features a sculpture Man with Two Hats by Henk Visch, which is identical to one in Commissioners Park in Ottawa, titled The Man with Two Hats.
