= Commissioners Park (Ottawa) =

Park in Ottawa, Ontario, Canada

Coordinates: 45°23′54″N 75°42′12″W

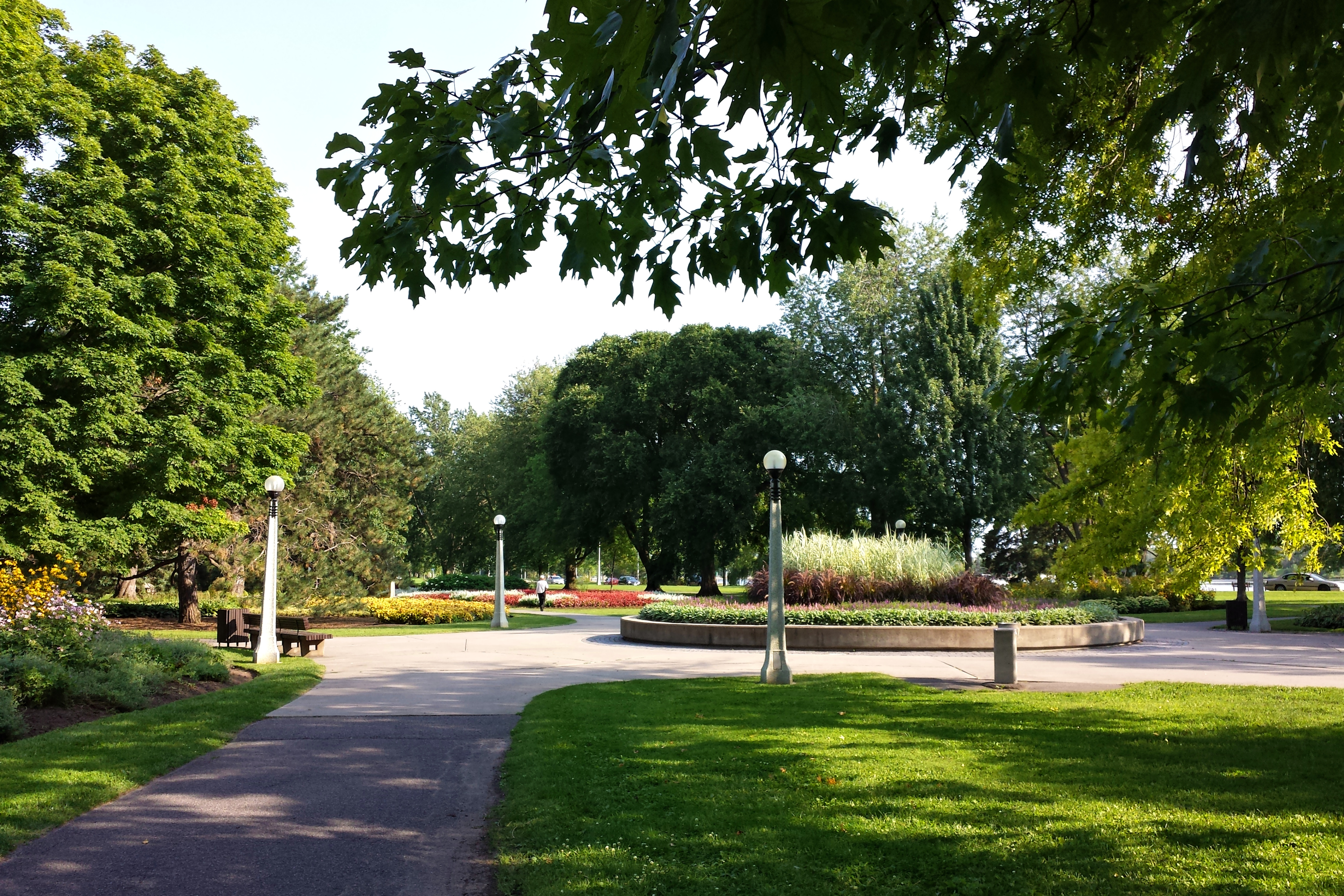
Commissioners Park

Commissioners Park is a park in Ottawa, Ontario, Canada. It lies within the westernmost section of The Glebe, bounded by Dow's Lake, Preston Street, Carling Avenue and Dow's Lake Road.

Throughout the warmer months it is a popular place for family walks. The National Capital Commission maintains the park and manages to keep flowers blooming there throughout the growing season. During the annual Canadian Tulip Festival, it is a major tulip viewing area with the highest concentration of tulips in the region numbering as many as 300,000.

== History ==
=== 1945: Gift from HRH Juliana ===
What is now known as the Canadian Tulip Festival at the park was originally a gift of 100,000 tulips given in 1945 by Crown Princess Juliana of the Netherlands, as she then was known, to mark Canada's contribution to the liberation of the Netherlands from the Nazi occupation and "as thanks to Ottawa for sheltering her family during the war."

=== 2002: Man with Two Hats sculpture ===
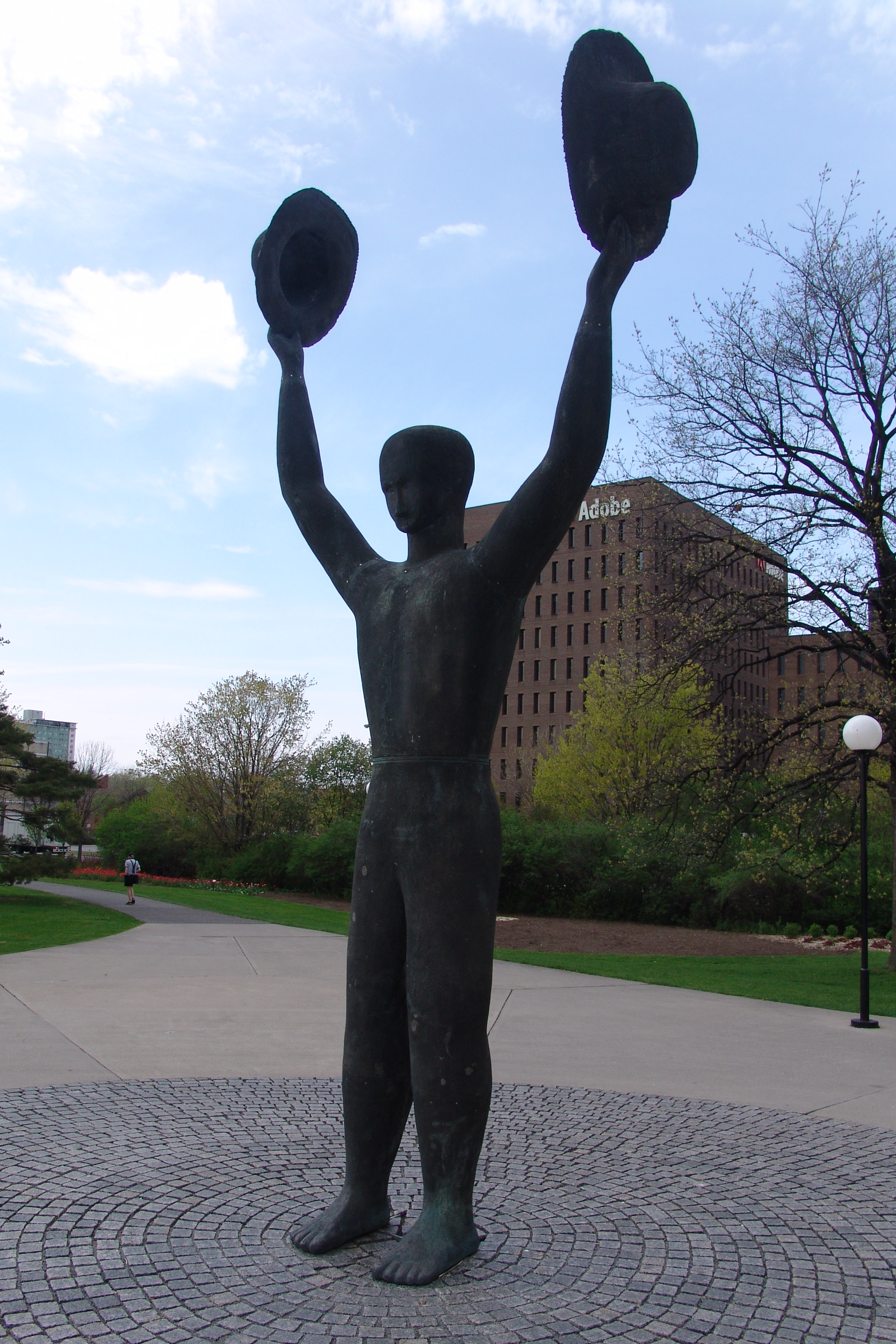
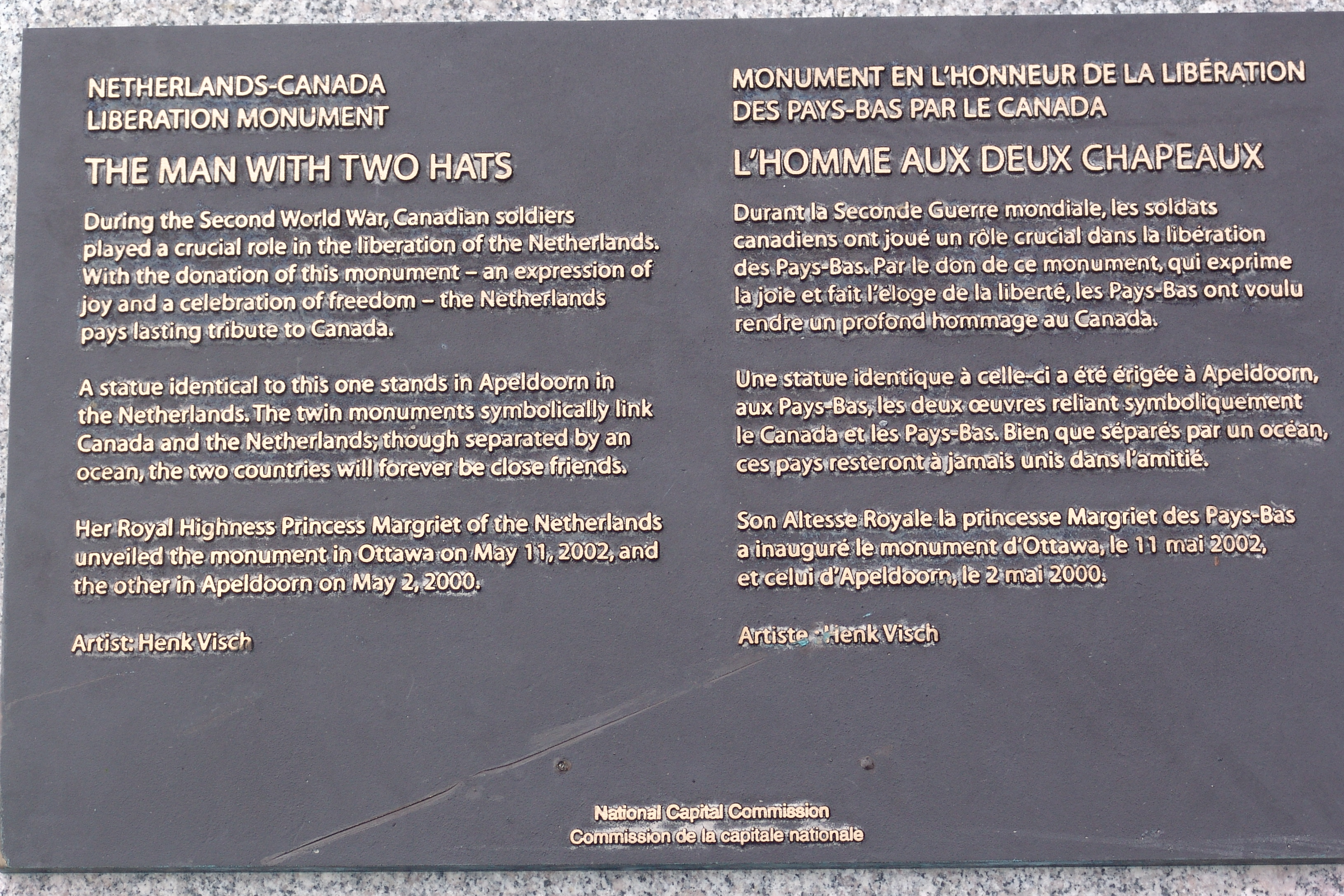
The statue and its plaque.

It features a sculpture Man with Two Hats by Henk Visch, commemorating the liberation of Holland by Canadian troops during World War II, which is identical to the National Canadian Liberation Monument in Apeldoorn, the Netherlands.

An explanatory plaque contains the following text:

During the Second World War, Canadian soldiers played a crucial role in the liberation of the Netherlands. With the donation of this monument - an expression of joy and a celebration of freedom - the Netherlands pays lasting tribute to Canada.
A statue identical to this one stands in Apeldoorn in the Netherlands. The twin monuments symbolically link Canada and the Netherlands; though separated by an ocean, the two countries will forever be close friends.
Her Royal Highness Princess Margriet of the Netherlands unveiled the monument in Ottawa on May 11, 2002, and the other in Apeldoorn on May 2, 2000.
Artist: Henk Visch
