= Paul Fabius =

Dutch academic and politician

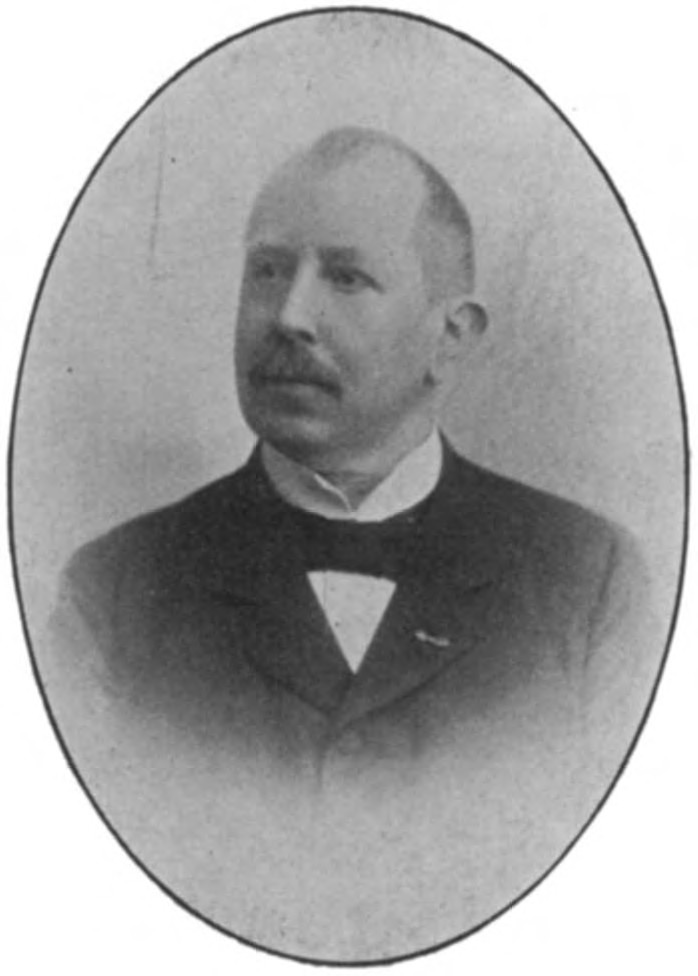
Fabius in 1898

Dammes Paulus Dirk Fabius (6 July 1851 – 21 December 1931) was a Dutch academic and politician.

Fabius was born in Garderen and studied law at Leiden University, completing his doctorate in 1878. During his studies he helped edit De Standaard and was influenced by Groen van Prinsterer. According to Arie van Deursen, Fabius cites van Prinsterer on virtually every page of his writing.

Fabius was professor of constitutional law, legal philosophy and canon law at the Vrije Universiteit Amsterdam from 1880 to 1921 and served as rector magnificus of that institution five times. He supporter Abraham Kuyper in the formation of the Reformed Churches in the Netherlands.

As a member of the Anti-Revolutionary Party, Fabius served on the Amsterdam municipal council from 1891 to 1919 and was a member of the Provincial Council of North Holland from 1897 to 1919. From 1919 to 1931 he was a member the Council of State.

His conservative views on social issues met with resistance within his party, especially his opposition to Johannes Tak van Poortvliet's proposed electoral act in 1894 that would have granted suffrage to all adult males. He also opposed proportional representation and compulsory education as contrary to Reformed principles.

Fabius was appointed Knight of the Order of the Netherlands Lion in 1894 and Commander of the Order of Orange-Nassau in 1910.

Academic offices
Preceded by Philippus Jacobus Hoedemaker	Rector Magnificus of the Vrije Universiteit Amsterdam; 1883-1884; 1889-1890; 1894-1895; 1899-1900; 1906-1907	Succeeded by F. W. J. Dilloo
Preceded by Frederik Lodewijk Rutgers	Rector Magnificus of the Vrije Universiteit Amsterdam; 1883-1884; 1889-1890; 1894-1895; 1899-1900; 1906-1907	Succeeded by Jan Woltjer
Preceded by Frederik Lodewijk Rutgers	Rector Magnificus of the Vrije Universiteit Amsterdam; 1883-1884; 1889-1890; 1894-1895; 1899-1900; 1906-1907	Succeeded by Jan Woltjer
Preceded by Abraham Kuyper	Rector Magnificus of the Vrije Universiteit Amsterdam; 1883-1884; 1889-1890; 1894-1895; 1899-1900; 1906-1907	Succeeded by Jan Woltjer
Preceded by Frederik Lodewijk Rutgers	Rector Magnificus of the Vrije Universiteit Amsterdam; 1883-1884; 1889-1890; 1894-1895; 1899-1900; 1906-1907	Succeeded by Jan Woltjer
