= List of rectores magnifici of the Vrije Universiteit Amsterdam =

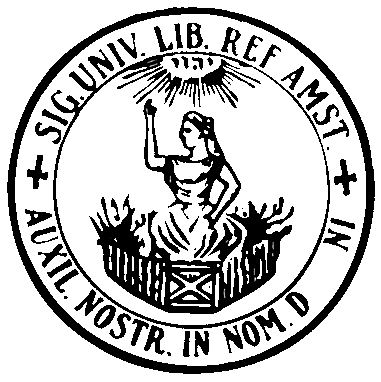
Logo of the Vrije Universiteit Amsterdam

The rector of a Dutch university is called a rector magnificus. The following people have been rector magnificus of the Vrije Universiteit Amsterdam:

Period	Name	Image	Additional info
1880-1881	Abraham Kuyper		
1881-1882	Frederik Lodewijk Rutgers		
1882-1883	Ph.J. Hoedemaker		
1883-1884	Dammes Paulus Dirk Fabius		
1884-1885	F.W.J. Dilloo		
1885-1886	Jan Woltjer		
1886-1887	Alexander de Savornin Lohman		
1887-1888	Abraham Kuyper		
1888-1889	Frederik Lodewijk Rutgers		
1889-1890	Dammes Paulus Dirk Fabius		
1890-1891	Jan Woltjer		
1891-1892	Abraham Kuyper		
1892-1893	Alexander de Savornin Lohman		
1893-1894	Frederik Lodewijk Rutgers		
1894-1895	Dammes Paulus Dirk Fabius		
1895-1896	Jan Woltjer		
1896-1897	G.H.J.W.J. Geesink		
1897-1898	Frederik Lodewijk Rutgers		
1898-1899	Abraham Kuyper		
1899-1900	Dammes Paulus Dirk Fabius		
1900-1901	Jan Woltjer		
1901-1902	G.H.J.W.J. Geesink		
1902-1903	Herman Huber Kuyper		
1903-1904	Herman Bavinck		
1904-1905	Petrus Biesterveld		
1905-1906	Frederik Lodewijk Rutgers		
1906-1907	Dammes Paulus Dirk Fabius		
1907-1908	Jan Woltjer		
1908-1909	G.H.J.W.J. Geesink		
1909-1910	Herman Huber Kuyper		
1910-1911	Herman Bavinck		
1911-1912	Robert Herman Woltjer		
1912-1913	A. Anema		
1913-1914	P.A. Diepenhorst		
1914-1915	Cornelis van Gelderen		
1915-1916	Leendert Bouman		
1916-1917	P.A.E. Sillevis Smitt		
1917-1918	Frederik Willem Grosheide		
1918-1919	G.H.J.W.J. Geesink		
1919-1920	Herman Huber Kuyper		
1920-1921	Robert Herman Woltjer		
1921-1922	A. Anema		
1922-1923	P.A. Diepenhorst		
1923-1924	Cornelis van Gelderen		
1924-1925	Leendert Bouman		
1925-1926	Frederik Willem Grosheide		
1926-1927	Adriaan Goslinga		
1927-1928	A.A. van Schelven		
1928-1929	G.Ch. Aalders		
1929-1930	Henk Pos		
1930-1931	Herman Huber Kuyper		
1931-1932	Herman Dooyeweerd		
1932-1933	Dirk Hendrik Theodoor Vollenhoven		
1933-1934	V.H. Rutgers		
1934-1935	Jacobus Wille		
1935-1936	Lammert van der Horst		
1936-1937	Jan Waterink		
1937-1938	Gerardus J. Sizoo		
1938-1939	Jurjen Koksma		
1939-1940	Alexander Sizoo		
1940-1942	V.H. Rutgers		
1942-1943	Doede Nauta		
1943-1945	Jacobus Oranje		
1945-1946	Jan Coops		
1946-1947	Robert Herman Woltjer		
1947-1948	Pieter Diepenhorst		
1948-1949	Frederik Willem Grosheide		
1949-1950	Gerhard Charles Aalders		
1950-1951	Herman Dooyeweerd		
1951-1952	Dirk Hendrik Theodoor Vollenhoven		
1952-1953	Gerardus J. Sizoo		
1953-1954	Jurjen Koksma		
1954-1955	Jan Waterink		
1955-1956	Doede Nauta		
1956-1957	W.H. Gispen		
1957-1958	G.H.A. Grosheide F. Wzn		
1958-1959	Gerrit Cornelis Berkouwer		
1959-1960	Koos Verdam		
1960-1961	Isaäc Arend Diepenhorst		
1961-1962	Hendrik Smitskamp		
1962-1963	Gaius de Gaay Fortman		
1963-1964	Folkert de Roos		
1964-1965	Reinier Schippers		
1965-1972	Gaius de Gaay Fortman		
1972-1976	Isaäc Arend Diepenhorst		
1976-1977	Job de Ruiter		
1978	Dick Schenkeveld		
1979-1983	Hendrik Verheul		
1983-1987	Piet Drenth		
1987-1993	Cees Datema		
1993-1997	Egbert Boeker		
1997-2006	Taede Sminia		
2006-2013	Lex Bouter		
2013-2015	Frank van der Duyn Schouten		
2015-2021	Vinod Subramaniam		
2022-	Jeroen Geurts		

== Publication ==
- A.Th. van Deursen: The distinctive character of the Free University in Amsterdam, 1880-2005. A commemorative history. Grand Rapids, Michigan, William B. Eerdmans Publishing Company, 2008. ISBN 9780802862518
