= Job de Ruiter =

Dutch politician (1930–2015)

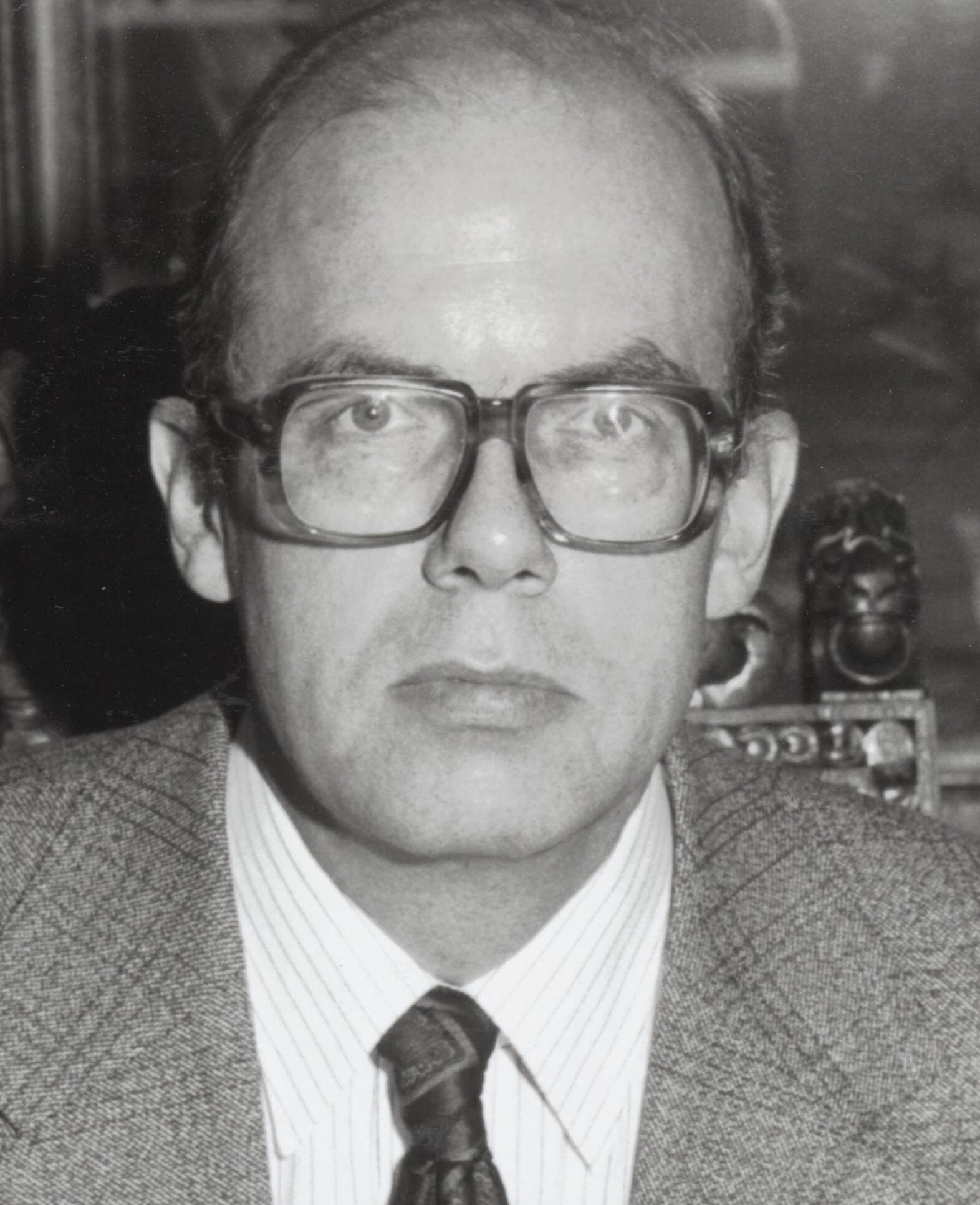
- De Ruiter in 1977

Attorney General of the Courts of Appeal of Amsterdam
- In office 1 September 1986 – 1 January 1991
- Preceded by: Hendrik Lagerwaard
- Succeeded by: Rutger van Randwijck

Minister of Defence
- In office 4 November 1982 – 14 July 1986
- Prime Minister: Ruud Lubbers
- Preceded by: Hans van Mierlo
- Succeeded by: Wim van Eekelen

Member of the House of Representatives
- In office 16 September 1982 – 4 November 1982
- In office 10 June 1981 – 9 September 1981
- Parliamentary group: Christian Democratic Appeal

Minister of Justice
- In office 19 December 1977 – 4 November 1982
- Prime Minister: Dries van Agt
- Preceded by: Gaius de Gaay Fortman
- Succeeded by: Frits Korthals Altes

Personal details
- Born: Jacob de Ruiter; 30 April 1930 Giessendam, Netherlands
- Died: 4 October 2015 (aged 85) Naarden, Netherlands
- Party: Christian Democratic Appeal (from 1980)
- Other political affiliations: Anti-Revolutionary Party (until 1980)
- Spouse: Jannien Been (m. 1956; died 2014)
- Children: 2 sons and 1 daughter
- Education: Utrecht University (Bachelor of Laws, Master of Laws, Doctor of Law, Doctor of Philosophy)
- Occupation: Politician · Civil servant · Jurist · Lawyer · Prosecutor · Judge · Researcher · Academic administrator · Professor

Jacob "Job" de Ruiter (30 April 1930 – 4 October 2015) was a Dutch politician and diplomat of the defunct Anti-Revolutionary Party (ARP) party and later the Christian Democratic Appeal (CDA) party and jurist.

De Ruiter worked as a researcher at the Utrecht University from 1953 until 1955 and as a lawyer and prosecutor in The Hague and Amsterdam from 1955 until 1963 and also served as a judge at the court of Utrecht from 1962 until 1963. De Ruiter worked as a professor of Criminal law and Family law at the Vrije Universiteit Amsterdam, taking office on 1 August 1963. He also served as Rector Magnificus of the Vrije Universiteit Amsterdam, taking office on 1 January 1976. After the election of 1977 De Ruiter was appointed as Minister of Justice in the Cabinet Van Agt–Wiegel, taking office on 19 December 1977. De Ruiter was elected as a Member of the House of Representatives after the election of 1981, taking office on 10 June 1981. Following the cabinet formation of 1981 De Ruiter continued as Minister of Justice in the Cabinet Van Agt II, taking office on 11 September 1981. The Cabinet Van Agt II fell just seven months into its term on 12 May 1982 and was replaced by the caretaker Cabinet Van Agt III with De Ruiter continuing as Minister of Justice, taking office on 29 May 1982. After the election of 1982 De Ruiter returned as a Member of the House of Representatives, taking office on 16 September 1982. Following the cabinet formation of 1982 De Ruiter was appointed as Minister of Defence in the Cabinet Lubbers I, taking office on 4 November 1982. In January 196 De Ruiter announced his retirement from national politics and that he would not stand for the election of 1986. The Cabinet Lubber III was replaced by the Cabinet Lubbers II on 14 July 1986.

De Ruiter retired from active politics and returned to the public sector and was appointed as Attorney General of the Courts of Appeal of Amsterdam, serving from 1 September 1986 until 1 January 1991. He also served as a distinguished professor of Criminal law and Family law at the Utrecht University, serving from 15 February 1989 until 1 May 1995.

== Decorations ==
Honours
Ribbon bar	Honour	Country	Date	Comment
	Grand Cross of the Order of Leopold II	Belgium	15 December 1980	
	Grand Officer of the Order of the Oak Crown	Luxembourg	22 March 1983	
	Knight Commander of the Order of Merit	Germany	30 August 1983	
	Grand Officer of the Legion of Honour	France	6 February 1984	
	Commander of the Order of the Netherlands Lion	Netherlands	26 August 1986	

Political offices
Preceded by Gaius de Gaay Fortman	Minister of Justice; 1977–1982	Succeeded by Frits Korthals Altes
Preceded by Hans van Mierlo	Minister of Defence; 1982–1986	Succeeded by Wim van Eekelen
Legal offices
Preceded by Hendrik Lagerwaard	Attorney General of the Courts of Appeal of Amsterdam; 1986–1991	Succeeded by Rutger van Randwijck
Academic offices
Preceded by Isaäc Arend; Diepenhorst	Rector Magnificus of the Vrije Universiteit Amsterdam; 1976–1977	Succeeded by Dick Schenkeveld
