= Frederik Rutgers =

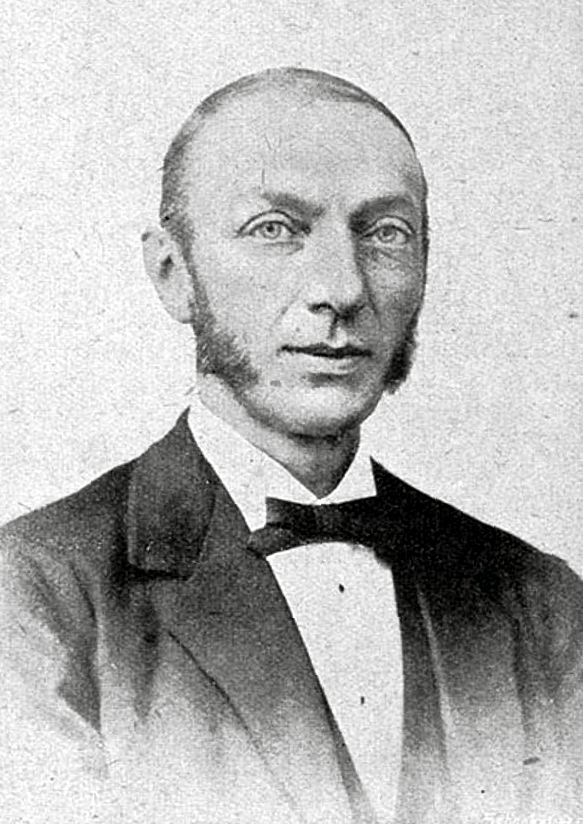
Frederik Rutgers

Frederik Lodewijk Rutgers (26 November 1836 – 19 March 1917) was a Dutch theologian and church historian. He served as rector magnificus of the Vrije Universiteit Amsterdam five times.

Rutgers was born in Breede and received his doctorate from Leiden University in 1860. He served as professor of church history and church law at the VU from 1879 to 1910. According to Arie van Deursen, he was "indispensable and priceless" to Abraham Kuyper:

When Kuyper had laid out the main lines, he could leave the routine work to Rutgers. He dotted all the i's and found the right place for every comma.

Academic offices
| Preceded by Abraham Kuyper | Rector Magnificus of the Vrije Universiteit Amsterdam; 1881-1882; 1888-1889; 1893-1894; 1897-1898; 1905-1906 | Succeeded by Ph. J. Hoedemaker |
| Preceded by Abraham Kuyper | Rector Magnificus of the Vrije Universiteit Amsterdam; 1881-1882; 1888-1889; 1893-1894; 1897-1898; 1905-1906 | Succeeded by Dammes Paulus Dirk Fabius |
| Preceded by Alexander de Savornin Lohman | Rector Magnificus of the Vrije Universiteit Amsterdam; 1881-1882; 1888-1889; 1893-1894; 1897-1898; 1905-1906 | Succeeded by Dammes Paulus Dirk Fabius |
| Preceded by G.H.J.W.J. Geesink | Rector Magnificus of the Vrije Universiteit Amsterdam; 1881-1882; 1888-1889; 1893-1894; 1897-1898; 1905-1906 | Succeeded by Abraham Kuyper |
| Preceded by Petrus Biesterveld | Rector Magnificus of the Vrije Universiteit Amsterdam; 1881-1882; 1888-1889; 1893-1894; 1897-1898; 1905-1906 | Succeeded by Dammes Paulus Dirk Fabius |
