= Philippus Jacobus Hoedemaker =

Dutch minister and professor

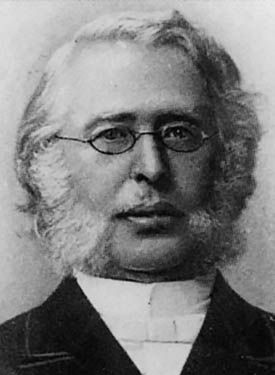
Ph.J. Hoedemaker

Philippus Jacobus Hoedemaker (15 July 1839 – 26 July 1910) was a Dutch minister and professor. He was a leading figure in the tumultuous late-19th to early-20th century Dutch politico-ecclesiastical landscape.

== Early life ==
Born in 1839 into a Separated Reformed ("Afgescheiden Gereformeerde") church family – although his subsequent career would be conducted within the "Hervormd" national church – Hoedemaker spent his teen and early-college-age years in the United States, where his family moved in 1852. He studied theology for three years at the Congregationalist College in Chicago (again noteworthy considering his future ecclesiastical orientation), during which time he supported himself by preaching, for which, it was acknowledged on all sides, he had a gift.

Hoedemaker returned to Europe in 1861 to complete his education, in 1867 graduating magna cum laude from Utrecht University with a doctorate in divinity, by virtue of a dissertation entitled Het Probleem der Vrijheid en het Theïstisch Godsbegrip [The Problem of Freedom and the Theistic Concept of God] (Amsterdam, H. Höveker, 1867).

In the dedication he makes mention of a surprise figure, Ralph Waldo Emerson. First, he quotes him:

Profounder, profounder mans [sic] spirit must dive,
To his aye rolling orbit, no goal will arrive,
The heavens which now draw him, with sweetness untold
Once found, for new heavens he leaveth the old.

after which follows the dedication proper:

RALPH WALDO EMERSON,
POET AND THINKER.
FOR HIS KIND APPRECIATION OF MY BOYISH EFFORTS,
AND THE IMPETUS HE HAS GIVEN TOWARDS MY STUDIES,
AS WELL AS THE INFLUENCE HE HAS HAD ON MY MIND,
THIS WORK IS RESPECTFULLY INSCRIBED BY
THE AUTHOR.

Hoedemaker's orientation towards philosophy thus comes as no surprise. Emerson had sat in on one of his school presentations "and immediately saw something special in him." A broad philosophical and cultural interest accompanied his ecclesiastical and theological endeavors throughout his life. His stay in America also had an enduring effect on his outlook. "In all circumstances his mind retained something of the breadth of the forests and plains of America. Dutch popular piety and American cultural openness remained united in him. Something of the adventurous daring enterprise of the colonists intersected with his loyalty to the piety that he inherited, in particular from his mother."

Indeed, it was his mother who prophesied that one day he would return to the fatherland and labor for the restoration of Neerlands kerk. Hoedemaker eventually made good on this prophecy, although only by more or less stumbling into it. As he related the story, upon arriving in the Netherlands he was invited to preach in two different congregations in Amsterdam, one a national Reformed, one a Separated Reformed. He accepted both invitations. But the separatist church, upon hearing of his acceptance of an invitation to preach in the national church, revoked its invitation. In this he discerned an indication of the direction his career should take.

== From minister of the Word to professor at the Free University ==
Hoedemaker's career as minister of the Word began in 1868 in Veenendaal with a call to the national church congregation there. This was followed by turns in Rotterdam (1873) and Amsterdam (1876). During this time he took part in the ongoing debates in the national (Hervormde) church as to church discipline and the place of orthodoxy versus modernism. While highly skeptical of the church organization, which was set up in bureaucratic fashion and which hampered cross-church assembly, he still promoted the "volkskerk" or people's church, a church that had national standing and dealt with the people as a whole. As he put it in his famous motto, "Heel de kerk voor heel het volk" (All the church for all the people).

During his period in Veenendaal, Hoedemaker befriended Abraham Kuyper, and in 1880 he accepted a position at the new Free University. But his differences with Kuyper and his followers would speedily become apparent. The immediate cause was Kuyper's exodus from the national church to form a separate denomination. Hoedemaker fought this movement with might and main. But his divergence was more than ecclesiastical. Hoedemaker opposed the so-called neocalvinist agenda as it developed under Kuyper's privatized-church emphases, viewing it as a further development of the Revolution, precisely what it was supposed to combat.

Not that he disagreed with Kuyper's basic agenda, to bring the lordship of Christ to bear in every area of life. On the contrary: it was Kuyper's purported betrayal of that goal which instigated the rupture. Hoedemaker shared the original purpose of the Free University, "which takes the Bible as the unconditional basis on which to rear the whole structure of human knowledge in every department of life," thus promoting science formed by Scripture and Confession, with theology restored as the "queen of the sciences." Kuyper's deviation from this program is precisely what turned Hoedemaker against him.

== Return to the ministry, advocate for the National Church ==
After his break with Kuyper, Hoedemaker returned to the pulpit, first in Frisia (Nijland, two years) and then Amsterdam, where he would lead the consolidation of the orthodox Reformed within the national church. He did this through various channels while always striving to remain above party formation, which he considered the curse of the modern age. (He did, however, form the Frisian League in 1898.) In this effort, his publishing career paralleled that of Kuyper's, although without approaching Kuyper's sheer volume. He published a range of books and pamphlets criticizing the Nonconformist movement, and he began editing a weekly church-oriented newspaper, The Reformed Church ("De Gereformeerde Kerk") in 1888, as a counterweight to Kuyper's The Herald ("De Heraut"). Interesting here is his choice of title. Kuyper had appropriated the term "Gereformeerd," the original designation of the Dutch Reformed church before it officially became the "Hervormde" church in 1816, for his splinter church. In response, Hoedemaker was sending the message that "Gereformeerd" was not the private property of the Nonconformists, but was the patrimonial title of the Dutch Reformed generally.

Both Article 36 of the Belgic Confession Vindicated against Dr. Abraham Kuyper and Reformed Ecclesiology in an Age of Denominationalism were written in this light. Beyond his writings on ecclesiology and church-state issues, Hoedemaker penned significant works on biblical theology, including a comprehensive critique of higher criticism.

Perhaps most important of all, Hoedemaker sparked a movement in favor of the national church and the heritage of the Christian state which gained many adherents and exerted profound influence on the development of Dutch theology, the national church, and Christian political action. Two of his most important followers were Dr. Oepke Noordmans (1871–1956) and Prof. A. A. van Ruler (1908–1970).

== Final days ==
Hoedemaker suffered a light stroke in 1907, which restricted but did not put an end to his preaching career (as witness the autobiographical sermon De Nood Ons Opgelegd [Forced by Necessity], delivered on 16 January 1908, and his retirement sermon, De Sabbat om de Mensch [The Sabbath was Made for Man], 30 August 1909). He died on 26 July 1910.

== Sources ==
de Bie and Loosjes, Biographisch woordenboek, pp. 51ff.
Dr. Ph. J. Hoedemaker 1868–1908: Gedenkboek ter Gelegenheid van zijn 40-jarige Ambtsbediening [Commemorative Book on the 40th Anniversary of Dr. Hoedemaker's Service]. Leyden: De Vlieger, 1908.
Scheers, George Philippus. Philippus Jacobus Hoedemaker. Wageningen: Drukkerij H. Veenman & Zonen, 1939.

== Translations available online ==
Dedication at the Founding of the Free University in Amsterdam
The Autonomy of Reason Considered from the Viewpoint of the Roman, the Lutheran, and the Reformed Church
The Darkness Behind the World Stage
The Reformation and the Reformed Church

== Translated works ==
Article 36 of the Belgic Confession Vindicated against Dr. Abraham Kuyper. Aalten: Pantocrator Press, 2019.
The Politics of Antithesis: The Antirevolutionary Government of Abraham Kuyper 1901–1905. Pantocrator Press, 2021.
Reformed Ecclesiology in an Age of Denominationalism. Aalten: Pantocrator Press, 2019.

Academic offices
Preceded by Frederik Lodewijk Rutgers	Rector Magnificus of the Vrije Universiteit Amsterdam; 1882–1883	Succeeded by Dammes P. D. Fabius
