= Jan Woltjer (classical scholar) =

Dutch politician

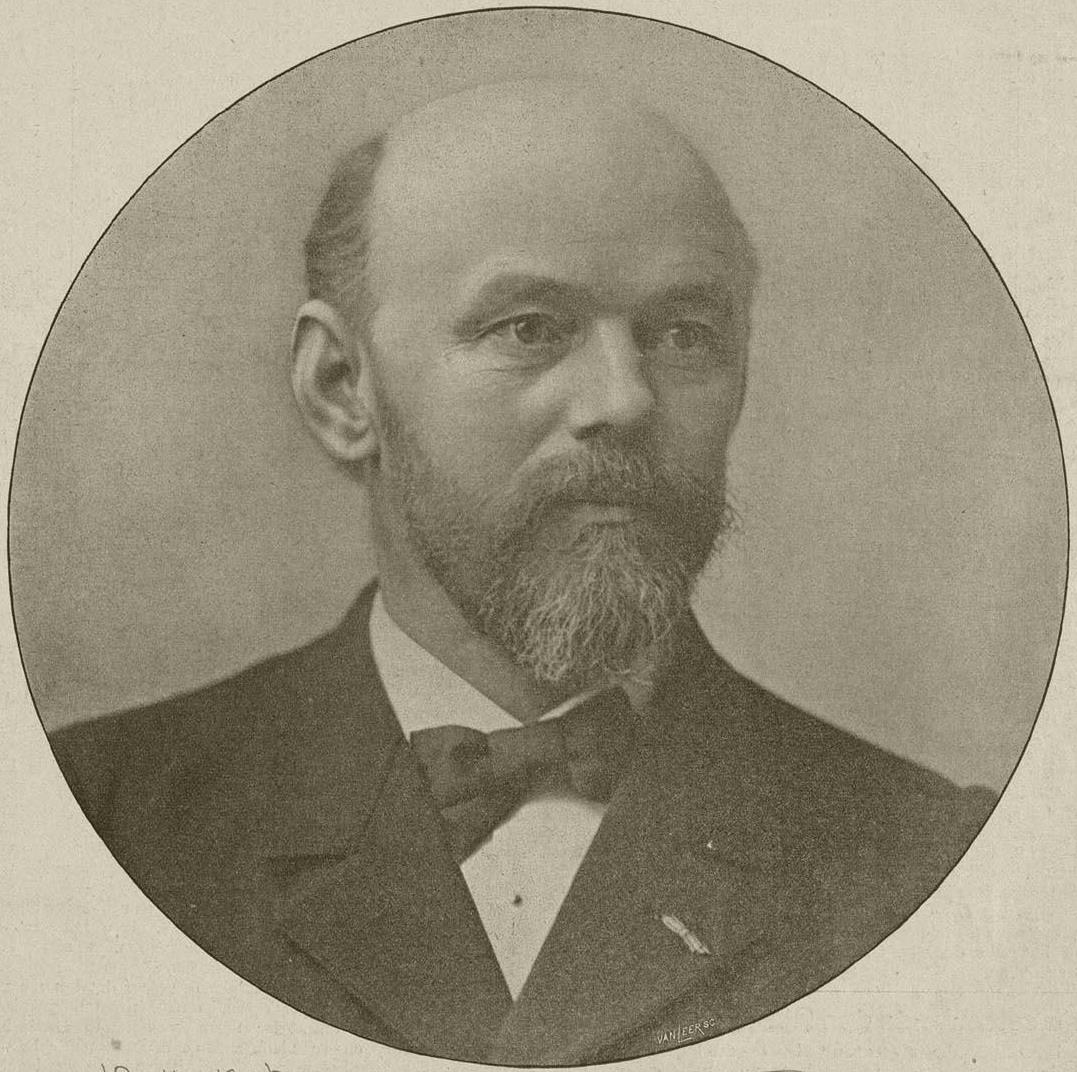
Jan Woltjer (in 1906)

Jan Woltjer (4 February 1849, Groningen – 28 July 1917, Amsterdam) was a professor of Classical languages and literature at the Vrije Universiteit Amsterdam. He served as rector magnificus of that institution five times.

Woltjer, the son of a baker, started his career as an assistant teacher at a high school in his hometown of Groningen in 1867. He taught himself Latin and managed to enter the University of Groningen in 1871. While teaching classical languages at a local gymnasium, he wrote his dissertation on Lucretius and was promoted in 1877. On 28 September that year he married Marchien Janssonius. In 1881 he moved to Amsterdam to become professor at the Free University, which position he would keep until his death in 1917. In 1902 he became member of the Royal Netherlands Academy of Arts and Sciences. He was involved in many educational organizations and was a member of the Senate for the Anti Revolutionaire Partij from 1902 to 1917. His oldest son, Robert H. Woltjer, would follow him teaching classical studies at the Free University. His son Jan Woltjer Jr would become a well-known astronomer.

Along his many other students, including Herman Dooyeweerd, Woltjer had a formidable influence on future professor of philosophy, D. H. Th. Vollenhoven, who used his training in Greek and Latin to make first of all a minutely detailed study of the Fragments of the Presocratics. Woltjers subscribed to the idea that Greek learning was an integral part of what the New Testament refers to when it speaks of "the fulness of times." The Greek learned constituted a preparatory education (paideia, cf Werner Jaeger) for the coming of Christ. To some extent, Woltjer's student Vollenhoven seems to have resisted this latter conception, as V came to view the major problem of developing a Christian philosophy to be the heavy tendency of all subsequent Christian thought in Western culture to fall back on a synthesis with Greek-originated presuppositions.

Academic offices
Preceded by F.W.J. Dilloo	Rector Magnificus of the Vrije Universiteit Amsterdam; 1885-1886; 1890-1891; 1895-1896; 1900-1901; 1907-1908	Succeeded by Alexander de Savornin Lohman
Preceded by Dammes Paulus Dirk Fabius	Rector Magnificus of the Vrije Universiteit Amsterdam; 1885-1886; 1890-1891; 1895-1896; 1900-1901; 1907-1908	Succeeded by Abraham Kuyper
Preceded by Dammes Paulus Dirk Fabius	Rector Magnificus of the Vrije Universiteit Amsterdam; 1885-1886; 1890-1891; 1895-1896; 1900-1901; 1907-1908	Succeeded by G.H.J.W.J. Geesink
Preceded by Dammes Paulus Dirk Fabius	Rector Magnificus of the Vrije Universiteit Amsterdam; 1885-1886; 1890-1891; 1895-1896; 1900-1901; 1907-1908	Succeeded by G.H.J.W.J. Geesink
Preceded by Dammes Paulus Dirk Fabius	Rector Magnificus of the Vrije Universiteit Amsterdam; 1885-1886; 1890-1891; 1895-1896; 1900-1901; 1907-1908	Succeeded by G.H.J.W.J. Geesink
