= Geesink =

Geesink is a Dutch surname. Notable people with the surname include:

- Anton Geesink (1934–2010), Dutch judoka
- Willem Geesink (1854–1929), Dutch theologian
