= Jan Waterink =

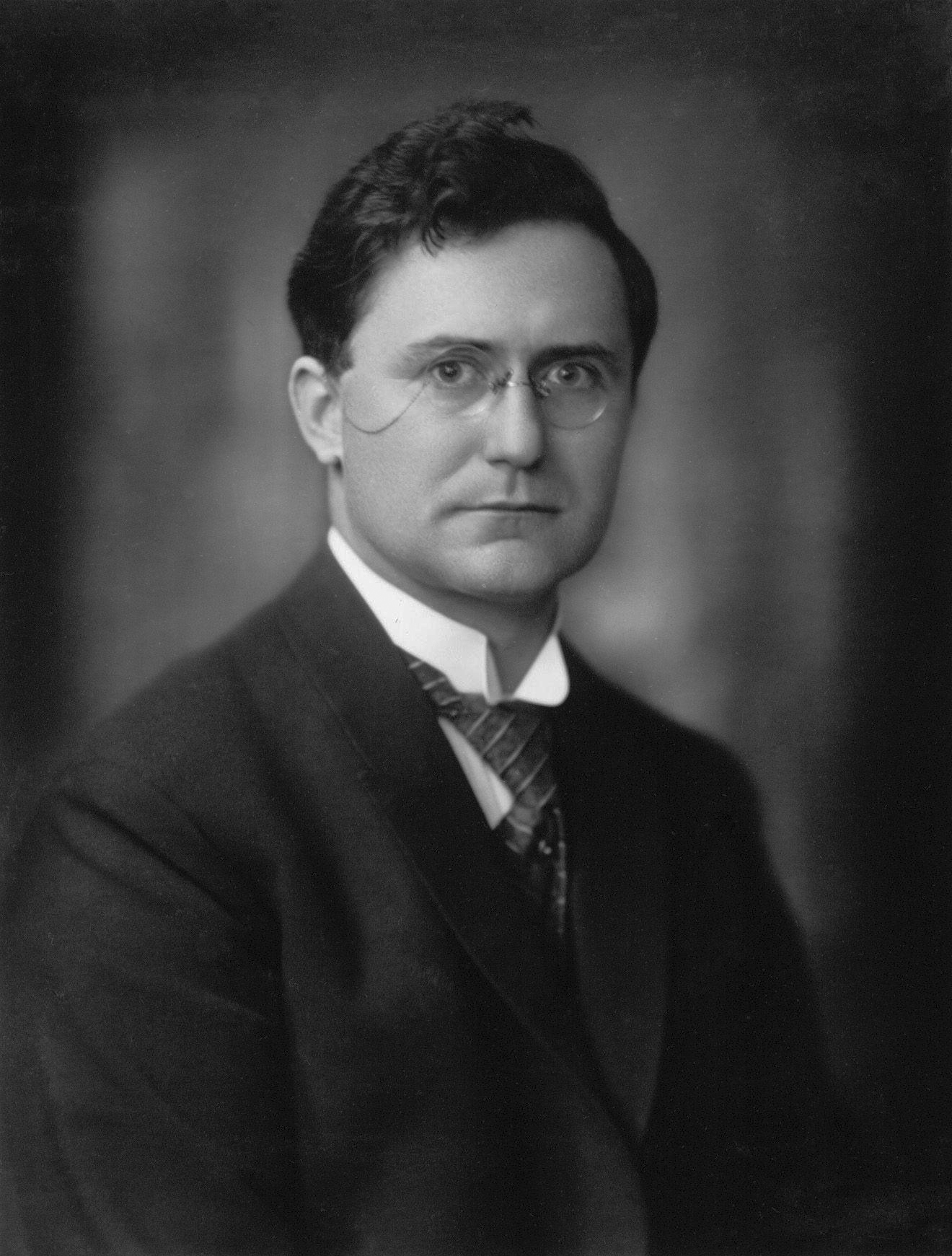
Waterink in 1920

Jan Waterink (20 October 1890 – 29 November 1966) was a Dutch pastor, psychologist and educationist who pioneered approaches to the testing and instruction of children with special needs.

Waterink was born in Den Hulst where his family, originally from Nieuwleusen, lived. His father was a pastor and he went to the Gymnasium at Kampen followed by theological studies. He worked as a pastor in Appelscha and then at Zutphen. He studied social geography at the University of Bonn and received a doctorate in theology from the Free University in Amsterdam in March 1923. He then taught at the Lyceum in Zutphen and served as professor of pedagogy. He also served as rector magnificus of the Free University several times.

Waterink founded a Psychotechnical Laboratory in 1927 where he established psychological tests which included puzzles and memory tests. He then became an advisor to the Reformed School Association. With a growing need for dealing with children and their education, he founded a Paedological Institute in 1931 which later subsumed the Psychotechnical Laboratory. During the Nazi period, Waterink hid Jewish children at institute. The institute became independent of the church in 1941. Waterink did not do much of the research himself but as an administrator he was much sought after around the world for advice.

He married Joukje van der Kam in 1914 and the couple had no children.
