= Gaius de Gaay Fortman =

Dutch politician (1911–1997)

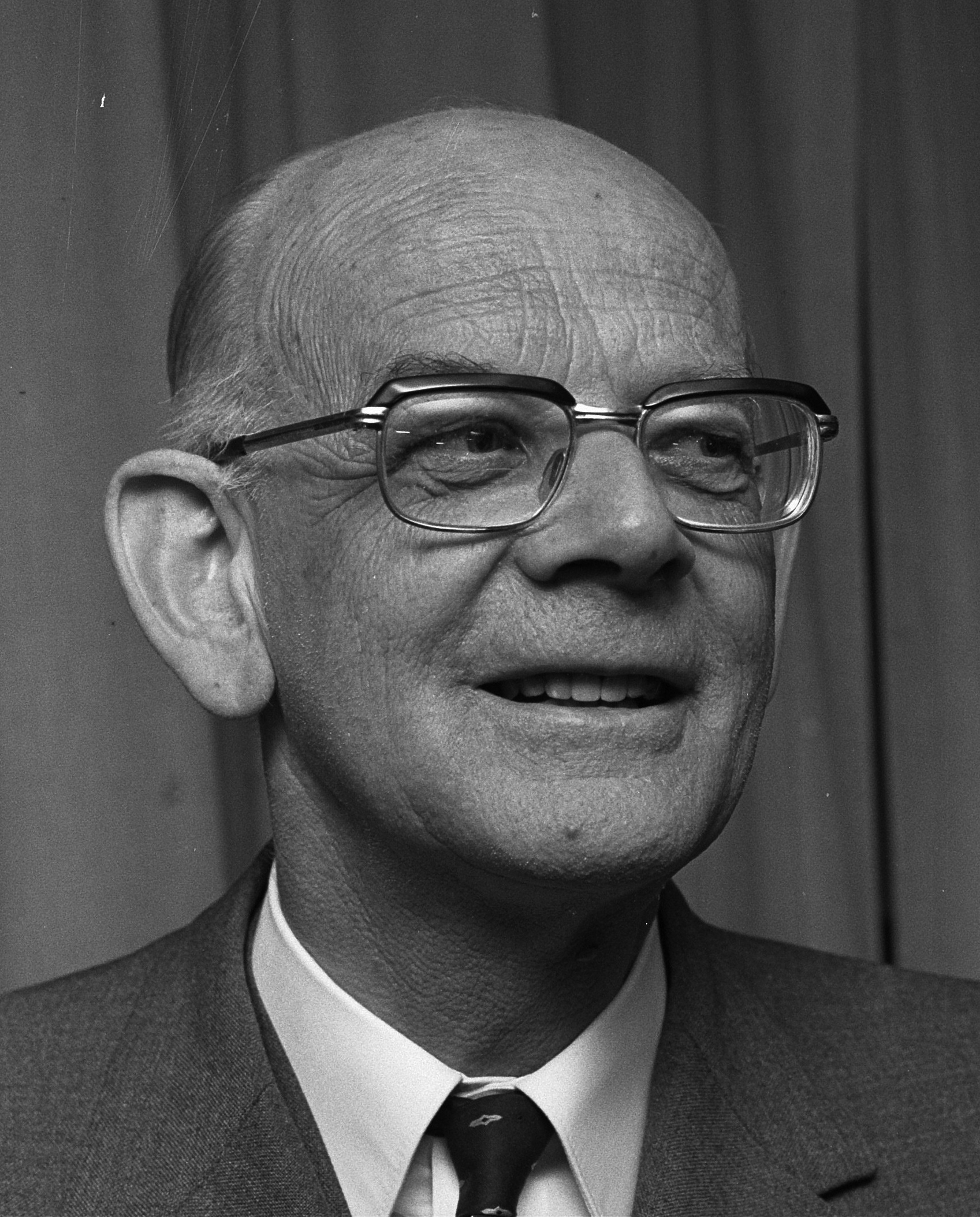
- Gaius de Gaay Fortman in 1973

Member of the European Parliament
- In office 13 March 1978 – 15 July 1979
- Parliamentary group: Christian Democratic Group
- Constituency: Netherlands

Deputy Prime Minister of the Netherlands
- In office 8 September 1977 – 19 December 1977
- Prime Minister: Joop den Uyl
- Preceded by: Dries van Agt
- Succeeded by: Hans Wiegel

Minister of Justice
- In office 8 September 1977 – 19 December 1977
- Prime Minister: Joop den Uyl
- Preceded by: Dries van Agt
- Succeeded by: Job de Ruiter

Minister of the Interior
- In office 11 May 1973 – 19 December 1977
- Prime Minister: Joop den Uyl
- Preceded by: Molly Geertsema
- Succeeded by: Hans Wiegel

Minister for Netherlands Antilles Affairs
- In office 25 November 1975 – 19 December 1977
- Prime Minister: Joop den Uyl
- Preceded by: Himself as Minister for Suriname and Netherlands Antilles Affairs
- Succeeded by: Fons van der Stee

Minister for Suriname and Netherlands Antilles Affairs
- In office 11 May 1973 – 25 November 1975
- Prime Minister: Joop den Uyl
- Preceded by: Molly Geertsema
- Succeeded by: Himself as Minister for Netherlands; Antilles Affairs

Parliamentary leader in the Senate
- In office 11 May 1971 – 11 May 1973
- Preceded by: Wiert Berghuis
- Succeeded by: Wil Albeda
- Parliamentary group: Anti-Revolutionary Party

Member of the Senate
- In office 20 September 1977 – 10 June 1981
- In office 20 September 1960 – 11 May 1973

Personal details
- Born: Wilhelm Friedrich de Gaay Fortman; 8 May 1911 Amsterdam, Netherlands
- Died: 29 March 1997 (aged 85) The Hague, Netherlands
- Party: Christian Democratic Appeal (from 1980)
- Other political affiliations: Anti-Revolutionary Party (1934–1980)
- Spouse: Mary Woltjer (m. 1936)
- Children: Bas de Gaay Fortman (born 1937); 3 daughters and 1 other son
- Education: Vrije Universiteit Amsterdam (Bachelor of Laws, Master of Laws, Doctor of Law)
- Occupation: Politician; civil servant; jurist; researcher; academic administrator; nonprofit director; editor; author; professor

Wilhelm Friedrich "Gaius" de Gaay Fortman (Dutch pronunciation: [ˈɣɛi.ʏz də ɣaːi ˈfɔrtmɑn]; 8 May 1911 – 29 March 1997) was a Dutch jurist and politician of the Anti-Revolutionary Party (ARP).

De Gaay Fortman attended a gymnasium in Dordrecht from June 1923 until September 1925 and the Amsterdams Lyceum from September 1925 until July 1929 and applied at the Vrije Universiteit Amsterdam in July 1929 majoring in Law and obtaining a Bachelor of Laws degree in June 1930 before graduating with a Master of Laws degree in July 1933 and worked as a researcher at the Vrije Universiteit Amsterdam from 5 July 1933 until 12 June 1936 when he got a doctorate as a Doctor of Law on 12 June 1936. De Gaay Fortman worked as a civil servant from April 1934 until January 1947 for the department of Agricultural Emergency Management of the Ministry of Economic Affairs from April 1934 until September 1935 and for the department of Legal Affairs of the Ministry of Agriculture and Fisheries from September 1935 until February 1938 and for the department of Employment Insurances of the Ministry of Social Affairs from February 1938 until January 1947 and as Deputy Director-General of the department for Employment Insurances from April 1939 until August 1943 and as Director-General of the department for Employment Insurances from August 1943 until January 1947. On 10 May 1940 Nazi Germany invaded the Netherlands and the government fled to London to escape the German occupation. During the German occupation De Gaay Fortman continued his work for the Ministry of Social Affairs but was sympathetic with the Dutch resistance and worked as an editor for the underground newspaper Vrij Nederland from January 1943 until May 1945. De Gaay Fortman worked as professor of Labour law, Privacy law and Property law at the Vrije Universiteit Amsterdam from 10 January 1947 until May 1973. He also served as Rector Magnificus of the Vrije Universiteit Amsterdam from 1 January 1961 until 1 January 1962 and from 1 January 1965 until 1 January 1972. De Gaay Fortman was elected to the Senate in the 1960 Senate election, taking office on 20 September 1960. After the 1971 Senate election De Gaay Fortman was selected as parliamentary leader of Anti-Revolutionary Party in the Senate, taking office on 11 May 1971.

After the 1972 general election De Gaay Fortman was appointed as Minister of the Interior and Minister for Suriname and Netherlands Antilles Affairs in the Den Uyl cabinet, taking office on 19 December 1977. In March 1977, he announced that he would not stand in the 1977 general election but wished to return to the Senate. Following the resignation of Deputy Prime Minister and Minister of Justice Dries van Agt, De Gaay Fortman took over both positions on 8 September 1977. The Den Uyl cabinet was replaced by the Van Agt–Wiegel cabinet on 19 December 1977.

De Gaay Fortman remained in active politics: he was elected again to the Senate in the 1977 Senate election, serving from 20 September 1977 until 10 June 1981. De Gaay Fortman was selected as a Member of the European Parliament and dual served in those positions from 13 March 1978 until 15 July 1979. Following the end of his active political career, De Gaay Fortman returned as a professor of privacy law, labor law and administrative law at the Vrije Universiteit Amsterdam, serving from 20 December 1977 until 10 February 1979. After his retirement De Gaay Fortman occupied numerous seats as a nonprofit director for supervisory boards for non-governmental organizations and research institutes (Dutch Research Council, Institute of International Relations Clingendael, Transnational Institute, T.M.C. Asser Instituut and the Carnegie Foundation).

De Gaay Fortman was known for his abilities as a negotiator and consensus builder. De Gaay Fortman continued to comment on political affairs as a statesman until his death. His eldest son Bas de Gaay Fortman was also a politician, professor and author, he like his father had served in the Senate.

== Biography ==
=== Early life ===
Wilhelm Friedrich "Gaius" de Gaay Fortman was born in Amsterdam on 8 May 1911 to an orthodox Reformed Protestant family. The De Gaay Fortman family were descendants of 17th century Walloon immigrant Jacques Le Gay, and became one of the foremost Neo-Calvinist families in the Dutch Patriciate, with prominent ministers, scholars, business people and politicians.

=== Politics ===
The Reformed De Gaay Fortman was a progressive politician of the Anti-Revolutionary Party, the party which later merged with other Christian parties to form the Christian Democratic Appeal politician. He was a Public servant, secretary of the government labour negotiation team and a teacher at the CNV-school (Christian Labour Union). Later he became a professor at the Vrije Universiteit and its Rector Magnificus. In 1956 he was unsuccessful as informateur during the long 1956 cabinet formation. However, he was able in 1960 to quickly resolve a cabinet crisis. In 1973 he, together with Boersma, were persuaded to become a minister in the Cabinet Den Uyl. He had a good relationship with the formerly Reformed social-democrat party leader Joop den Uyl. As Minister of Home Affairs he proposed a plan to divide the Netherlands into 24 mini-provinces and he played a key role in the independence negotiations for Suriname in 1975. In 1981 he again acted in a cabinet formation as informateur and managed to pave the way for a government of CDA, PvdA and D66. De Gaay Fortman was in favor of co-operation of the ARP and later the CDA with the PvdA (left). He refuted offered positions in Christian Democrat – Liberal coalitions. De Gaay Fortman became a member of the CDA, but he became alienated from the party mainstream. In his view the CDA too much emphasised policies that resulted in the dismantling of social security. In the parliamentary elections of 1994 he endorsed Gert Schutte, the leader of the Reformed Political League. He is buried at Zorgvlied cemetery.

His son Bas de Gaay Fortman followed in the political footsteps of his father and became leader of the Political Party of Radicals in the Second Chamber and later a Senator for its successor, the GreenLeft party.

== Decorations ==
Honours
| Ribbon bar | Honour | Country | Date | Comment |
|---|---|---|---|---|
| | Honorary Medal for Initiative and Ingenuity of the Order of the House of Orange | Netherlands | 19 September 1974 | |
| | Grand Officer of the Order of Leopold II | Belgium | 1 August 1975 | |
| | Grand Cross of the Honorary Order of the Yellow Star | Suriname | 25 November 1975 | |
| | Grand Officer of the Legion of Honour | France | 28 February 1976 | |
| | Grand Officer of the Honorary Order of the Palm | Suriname | 4 September 1977 | |
| | Grand Officer of the Order of Orange-Nassau | Netherlands | 11 April 1978 | |
| | Commander of the Order of the Netherlands Lion | Netherlands | 10 June 1981 | Elevated from Knight (30 April 1959) |

Party political offices
| Preceded by Wiert Berghuis | Parliamentary leader of the Anti-Revolutionary Party in the Senate; 1971–1973 | Succeeded by Wil Albeda |
Political offices
| Preceded by Molly Geertsema | Minister for Suriname and Netherlands Antilles Affairs; 1973–1977 | Succeeded by Fons van der Stee |
| Preceded by Molly Geertsema | Minister of the Interior; 1973–1977 | Succeeded by Hans Wiegel |
| Preceded by Dries van Agt | Deputy Prime Minister; 1977 | Succeeded by Hans Wiegel |
| Preceded by Dries van Agt | Minister of Justice; 1977 | Succeeded by Job de Ruiter |
Academic offices
| Preceded by Hendrik Smitskamp | Rector Magnificus of the Vrije Universiteit Amsterdam; 1962–1963; 1965–1972 | Succeeded by Folkert de Roos |
| Preceded by Reinier Schippers | Rector Magnificus of the Vrije Universiteit Amsterdam; 1962–1963; 1965–1972 | Succeeded by Isaäc Arend Diepenhorst |
