= Theo Bot =

Dutch politician and diplomat

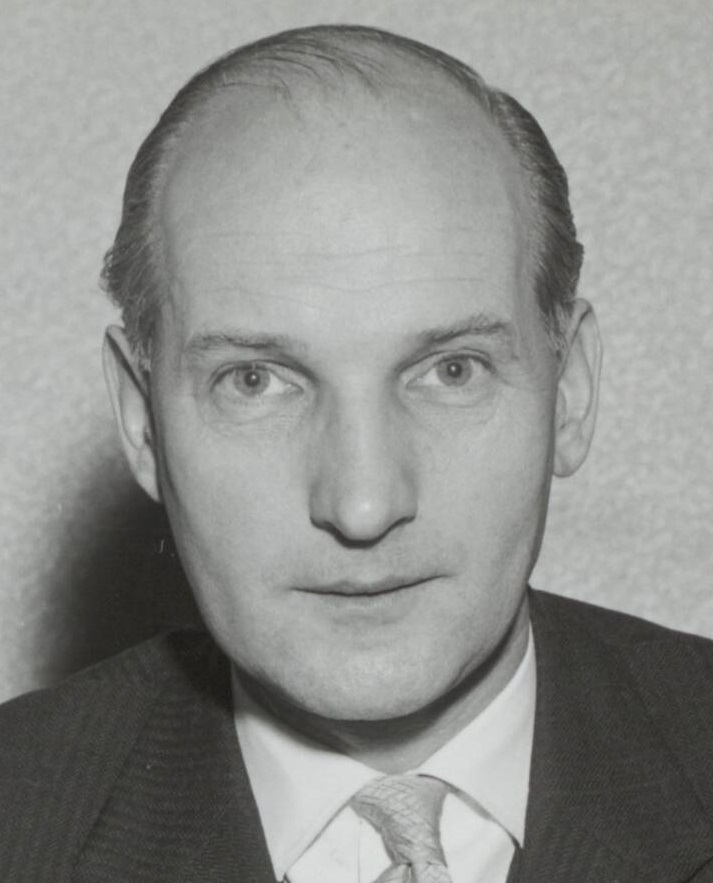
- Bot in 1959

Permanent Representative of the Netherlands to the IAEA
- In office 1 July 1973 – 1 August 1976
- Preceded by: Unknown
- Succeeded by: Unknown

Ambassador of the Netherlands to Austria
- In office 1 July 1973 – 1 August 1976
- Preceded by: Unknown
- Succeeded by: Unknown

Ambassador of the Netherlands to Canada
- In office 17 January 1968 – 1 July 1973
- Preceded by: Unknown
- Succeeded by: Unknown

Minister for Aid to Developing Countries
- In office 14 April 1965 – 5 April 1967
- Prime Minister: Jo Cals (1965–1966); Jelle Zijlstra (1966–1967)
- Preceded by: Office established
- Succeeded by: Bé Udink

Minister of Education, Arts and Sciences
- In office 24 July 1963 – 14 April 1965
- Prime Minister: Victor Marijnen
- Preceded by: Marga Klompé (Ad interim)
- Succeeded by: Isaäc Arend Diepenhorst

Member of the House of Representatives
- In office 2 July 1963 – 24 July 1963
- Parliamentary group: Catholic People's Party

State Secretary for the Interior
- In office 23 November 1959 – 24 July 1963
- Prime Minister: Jan de Quay
- Preceded by: Norbert Schmelzer as State Secretary for the Interior, Property and Public Sector; Organisations
- Succeeded by: Theo Westerhout

Personal details
- Born: Theodorus Hendrikus Bot; 20 July 1911 Dordrecht, Netherlands
- Died: 24 September 1984 (aged 73) The Hague, Netherlands
- Party: Christian Democratic Appeal (from 1980)
- Other political affiliations: Catholic People's Party (until 1980)
- Spouse: Elisabeth van Hal (m. 1936)
- Children: Ben Bot (born 1937); 6 other children
- Education: Utrecht University (Bachelor of Laws, Master of Laws); Royal Military Academy
- Occupation: Politician · Diplomat · Civil servant · Jurist · Political consultant · Nonprofit director · Lobbyist · Army officer

Military service
- Allegiance: Netherlands
- Branch/service: Royal Netherlands; East Indies Army
- Years of service: 1936–1940 (Reserve); 1940–1942 (Active duty)
- Rank: Lieutenant
- Battles/wars: World War II; Pacific War; Dutch East Indies campaign; Battle of Borneo

Theodorus Hendrikus "Theo" Bot (20 July 1911 – 24 September 1984) was a Dutch politician and diplomat of the defunct Catholic People's Party (KVP) now merged into the Christian Democratic Appeal (CDA) party and jurist.

Bot attended a Gymnasium in Utrecht from May 1924 until June 1930 and applied at the Utrecht University in June 1930 majoring in Law and obtaining a Bachelor of Laws degree in July 1932 before graduating with a Master of Laws degree in July 1936. Bot also applied at the Royal Military Academy in Breda in January 1933 to be trained as a reserve Artillery Officer in the Royal Netherlands East Indies Army graduating as a Lieutenant in September 1936. Bot worked as a civil servant for the Dutch East Indies Government in West Java from November 1936 until March 1942 in Purwakarta from November 1936 until August 1939 and in Sukabumi from August 1939 until March 1942. On 10 May 1940 Nazi Germany invaded the Netherlands and the government fled to London to escape the German occupation. Bot was called to active duty and served in an air defense artillery platoon during the Dutch East Indies campaign. On 8 March 1942 Bot was captured following the Battle of Borneo and detained in the Japanese internment camp Kampong Makassar. Bot was later transferred to the internment camp Thanbyuzayat in Burma to work on the Burma Railway and was detained until 30 September 1945 and following the end of World War II moved back to the Netherlands. Bot worked as a civil servant for the Ministry of Colonial Affairs from March 1946 until March 1949 as Deputy Director-General of the department for Constitutional Reform from March 1946 until June 1948 and as Deputy Director-General of the department for Political Affairs from June 1948 until March 1949. Bot worked as political advisor for the High Commissioner of the Dutch East Indies Tony Lovink from March 1949 until December 1949. Bot served as Deputy Secretary-General of the Netherlands-Indonesian Union and as a political consultant for the Ministry of Colonial Affairs from December 1949 tot March 1954. Bot worked as a civil servant for the Ministry of Foreign Affairs as Director-General of the department for NATO and Western European Union affairs from March 1954 until November 1959.

After the election of 1959 Bot was appointed as State Secretary for the Interior in the Cabinet De Quay, taking office on 23 November 1959. Bot was elected as a Member of the House of Representatives after the election of 1963, taking office on 2 July 1963. Following the cabinet formation of 1963 Bot was appointed Minister of Education, Arts and Sciences in the Cabinet Marijnen, taking office on 24 July 1963. The Cabinet Marijnen fell on 27 February 1965 after a disagreement in the coalition about reforms to the public broadcasting system and continued to serve in a demissionary capacity until the cabinet formation of 1965 when it was replaced by the Cabinet Cals with Bot appointed as Minister for Aid to Developing Countries, taking office on 14 April 1965. The Cabinet Cals fell on 14 October 1966 after the Leader of the Catholic People's Party Norbert Schmelzer had proposed a motion that called for a stronger austerity policy to further reduce the deficit was seen an indirect motion of no confidence and continued to serve in a demissionary capacity until the cabinet formation of 1966 when it was replaced by the caretaker Cabinet Zijlstra with Bot continuing as Minister for Aid to Developing Countries, taking office on 22 November 1966. In December 1966 Bot announced that he wouldn't stand for the election of 1967. Following the cabinet formation of 1967 Bot was not giving a cabinet post in the new cabinet, the Cabinet Zijlstra was replaced by the Cabinet De Jong on 5 April 1967.

Bot remained in active in national politics, in September 1967 he was nominated as Ambassador to Canada, taking office on 17 January 1968. In June 1973 Bot was nominated as Permanent Representative to the International Atomic Energy Agency (IAEA) and Ambassador to Austria, he resigned as Ambassador to Canada the same day he was installed as Permanent Representative to the IAEA and Ambassador to Austria, serving from 1 July 1973 until 1 August 1976.

Bot retired after spending 16 years in national politics and became active in the public sector and occupied numerous seats as a nonprofit director on several boards of directors and supervisory boards (UNICEF, United Nations Commission on Science and Technology for Development (CSTD), Oxfam Novib and the Transnational Institute) and served on several state commissions and councils on behalf of the government (Kadaster, Public Pension Funds PFZW, Sociale Verzekeringsbank and KPN) and served as a diplomat and lobbyist for several economic delegations on behalf of the government.

Bot was known for his abilities as a negotiator and consensus builder. Bot continued to comment on political affairs until his is death at the age of 73 and holds the distinction as the first serving Minister for Development Cooperation. His eldest son Ben is also a politician and diplomat and who served as Minister of Foreign Affairs from 3 December 2003 until 22 February 2007.

== Biography ==
=== Early life ===
Theodorus Hendrikus Bot was born on 20 July 1911 in Dordrecht in the Province of South Holland in a Roman Catholic family as one of three sons of Maria Theresia Frederica Creemers and Lourens Bot, a German language teacher. From 1923 to 1930 he went to the "Gemeentelijk Gymnasium" high school in Apeldoorn, and studied Indonesian law at Utrecht University from 1930 to September 1936. He also followed an education at the "School voor Reserve-Officieren der Bereden-Artillerie" (English: School for Reserve-Officers of the Horse-Artillery) in Ede.

=== Civil service ===
From 1936 to 1942 Bot was sent out for the civil service to the Dutch East Indies and would serve with the east-Asian service in Batavia, Purwakarta and Soekaboemi. During World War II he was in active service from 1940 to 8 March 1942 in the rank of reserve-first lieutenant of the horse-artillery. Afterwards he was a Japanese warprisoner at camps in Java, Birma and Thailand, until 30 September 1945, and worked on the Burma Railway. After the war he returned to the Netherlands in 1946, where he functioned in several functions related to the Dutch East Indies.

== Politics ==
Bot served as State Secretary of the Interior, in charge of matters concerning Netherlands New Guinea, from 23 November 1959 until 24 July 1963 in the De Quay cabinet. He was shortly a member of the House of Representatives from 2 July until 24 July 1963 when he became Minister of Education, Culture and Science in the Marijnen cabinet. He finally served as Minister without portfolio in charge of matters concerning development aid, from 14 April 1965 until 5 April 1967, in the Cals and Zijlstra cabinets.

After his membership of the cabinet he was appointed Dutch ambassador in Ottawa, Ontario, Canada in September 1967, serving from 17 January 1968 until July 1973. Consequently, he became ambassador in Vienna, Austria, and permanent representative to the International Atomic Energy Agency from July 1973 until 1 August 1976.

=== Other functions ===
- Chairman "Academie Leken Missie Actie" (English: Academy Non-religious Mission Action), 1959
- Honorary national advisor for development aid, since 1976
- Chairman National Committee in preparation of the UN-conference on Science and Technology for Development
- Chairman Dutch delegation at the board of UNICEF
- Chairman Foundation National Committee international year of the child 1979

== Personal ==
In 1936 he married Elisabeth W. van Hal. They had seven children. He is the father of Ben Bot, who would become minister of foreign affairs.

== Decorations ==
Military decorations
Ribbon bar	Decoration	Country	Date	Comment
	War Memorial Cross	Netherlands	5 May 1946	
	Mobilisation War Cross	Netherlands	31 August 1948	
Honours
Ribbon bar	Honour	Country	Date	Comment
	Knight of the Order of the Netherlands Lion	Netherlands	29 April 1957	
	Knight of the Order of the Holy Sepulchre	Holy See	5 June 1960	
	Grand Officer of the Order of the Crown	Belgium	10 December 1966	
	Commander of the Order of Orange-Nassau	Netherlands	17 April 1967	
	Grand Officer of the Order of the Oak Crown	Luxembourg	30 November 1974	
	Commander of the Legion of Honour	France	25 October 1975	
	Grand Decoration of Honour in Gold of the Decoration of Honour for Services	Austria	1 August 1976	
	Grand Cordon of the Honorary Order of the Palm	Suriname	17 May 1979	

Political offices
Preceded by Norbert Schmelzer	State Secretary for the Interior; 1959–1963	Succeeded by Theo Westerhout
Preceded by Marga Klompé; Ad interim	Minister of Education, Arts and Sciences; 1963–1965	Succeeded by Isaäc Arend; Diepenhorst
Preceded by Office established	Minister for Aid to Developing Countries; 1965–1967	Succeeded by Bé Udink
Diplomatic posts
Unknown	Ambassador of the Netherlands to Canada; 1968–1973	Unknown
Unknown	Ambassador of the Netherlands to Austria; 1973–1976	Unknown
Unknown	Permanent Representative of the Netherlands to the International Atomic Energy Agency; 1973–1976	Unknown
