= Isaäc Arend Diepenhorst =

Dutch politician (1916–2004)

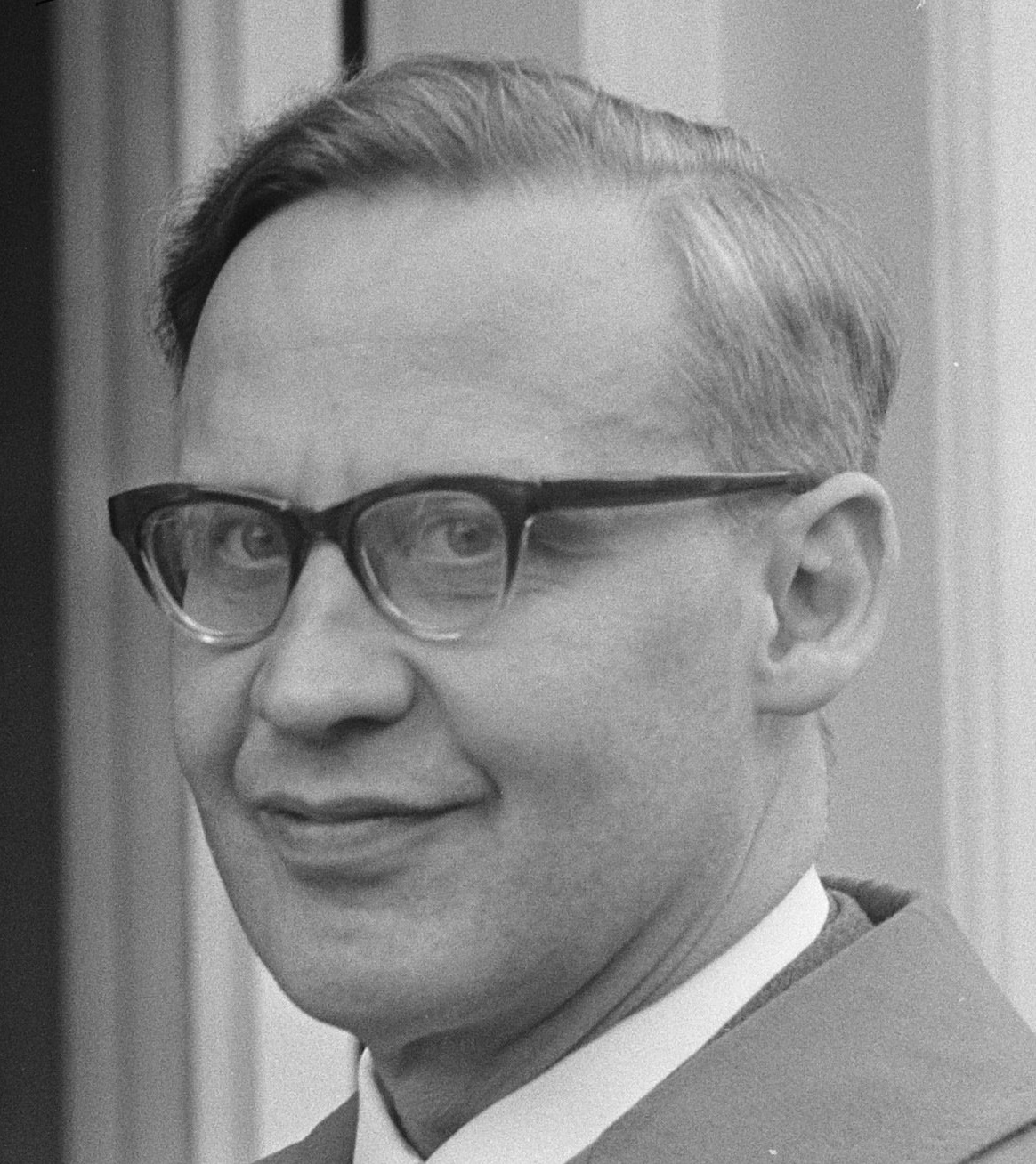
- Isaäc Arend Diepenhorst in 1966

Member of the House of Representatives
- In office 23 February 1967 – 11 May 1971
- Parliamentary group: Anti-Revolutionary Party

Minister of Education and Sciences
- In office 14 April 1965 – 5 April 1967
- Prime Minister: Jo Cals (1965–1966); Jelle Zijlstra (1966–1967)
- Preceded by: Theo Bot as Minister of Education, Arts and Sciences
- Succeeded by: Gerard Veringa

Member of the Senate
- In office 29 October 1974 – 10 June 1981
- In office 11 May 1971 – 17 September 1974
- In office 15 July 1952 – 14 April 1965
- Parliamentary group: Christian Democratic Appeal (1980–1981); Anti-Revolutionary Party (1952–1980)

Personal details
- Born: Isaäc Arend Diepenhorst; 18 July 1916 Rotterdam, Netherlands
- Died: 21 August 2004 (aged 88) Zeist, Netherlands
- Party: Christian Democratic Appeal (from 1980)
- Other political affiliations: Anti-Revolutionary Party (until 1980)
- Relations: Isaäc Nicolaas Diepenhorst (cousin)
- Education: Free University Amsterdam (Bachelor of Laws, Bachelor of Theology, Master of Laws, Master of Theology, Doctor of Law)
- Occupation: Politician · civil servant · Jurist · Historian · Researcher · Nonprofit director · Academic administrator · Education administrator · Radio presenter · Political pundit · Editor · Author · professor

Isaäc Arend "Iek" Diepenhorst (18 July 1916 – 21 August 2004) was a Dutch politician of the defunct Anti-Revolutionary Party (ARP) and later the Christian Democratic Appeal (CDA) party and jurist.

Diepenhorst applied at the Free University Amsterdam in June 1934 majoring in Law and Theology and obtaining Bachelor of Laws and Bachelor of Theology degrees in July 1936 and worked as a student researcher before graduating with a Master of Laws degree in September 1937 and a Master of Theology degree in March 1940 and later got a doctorate as a Doctor of Law on 10 June 1943. Diepenhorst worked as a professor of Criminal law and Criminal procedure at the Free University Amsterdam serving from October 1945 until April 1965. Diepenhorst also worked as a radio presenter and political pundit for the Dutch Christian Radio Association (NCRV) from April 1951 until September 1963. Diepenhorst was elected as a Member of the Senate after the Senate election of 1952, taking office on 15 July 1952. He also served as Rector Magnificus of the Free University Amsterdam from 1 January 1960 until 1 January 1961. On 27 February 1965 the Cabinet Marijnen fell and continued to serve in a demissionary capacity until the cabinet formation of 1965 when it was replaced by Cabinet Cals with Diepenhorst appointed as Minister of Education and Sciences, taking office on 14 April 1965. The Cabinet Cals fell just one year later on 14 October 1966 and continued to serve in a demissionary capacity until it was replaced by the caretaker Cabinet Zijlstra with Diepenhorst continuing as Minister of Education and Sciences, taking office on 22 November 1966. Diepenhorst was elected as a Member of the House of Representatives after the election of 1967, taking office on 23 February 1967. After the cabinet formation of 1967 Diepenhorst was not giving a cabinet post in the new cabinet, the Cabinet Zijlstra was replaced by the Cabinet De Jong on 5 April 1967 and he continued to serve in the House of Representatives as a frontbencher.

Diepenhorst returned as a distinguished professor of Constitutional law, Administrative law and Governmental studies at the Free University Amsterdam serving from 23 February 1967 until 28 September 1984 and also as a distinguished professor of Parliamentary History from 1 September 1976 until 28 September 1984. He also served again as Rector Magnificus of the Free University Amsterdam from 1 September 1972 until 1 September 1976. In January 1971 Diepenhorst announced that he wouldn't stand for the election of 1971 but wanted tot return to the Senate. After the Senate election of 1971 Diepenhorst returned to the Senate, he resigned as a Member of the House of Representatives the day he was installed as a Member of the Senate, serving from 11 May 1971 until 17 September 1974 and again from 29 October 1974 until 10 June 1981 serving as a frontbencher chairing several parliamentary committees. Diepenhorst also became active in the public sector occupying numerous seats as a nonprofit director on several boards of directors and supervisory boards (Royal Academy of Arts and Sciences, Netherlands Bible Society, Bartiméus Foundation and the Utrecht University) and served on several state commissions]] and councils on behalf of the government (Education Council, Probation Agency and the Council for Culture).

== Decorations ==
Honours
Ribbon bar	Honour	Country	Date	Comment
	Commander of the Order of Orange-Nassau	Netherlands	17 April 1967	
	Commander of the Order of the Netherlands Lion	Netherlands	3 June 1986	Elevated from Knight (27 April 1962)

Political offices
Preceded by Theo Bot as Minister of Education, Arts and Sciences	Minister of Education and Sciences; 1965–1967	Succeeded by Gerard Veringa
Civic offices
Unknown	Chairman of the Education Council; 1969–1986	Unknown
Academic offices
Preceded by Koos Verdam	Rector Magnificus of the Free University Amsterdam; 1960–1961; 1972–1976	Succeeded by Hendrik Smitskamp
Preceded by Gaius de Gaay Fortman	Rector Magnificus of the Free University Amsterdam; 1960–1961; 1972–1976	Succeeded by Job de Ruiter
