= H. H. Kuyper =

Dutch theologian (1864-1945)

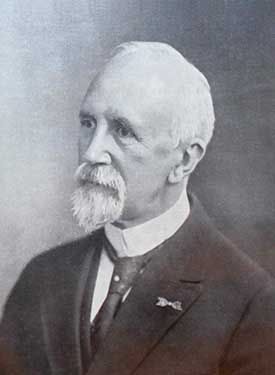
H. H. Kuyper

Herman Huber Kuyper (22 July 1864 – 29 January 1945) was a Dutch theologian.

He was the son of Abraham Kuyper, and was born in Beesd, while his father was pastor there. He studied at the Vrije Universiteit Amsterdam, obtaining his doctorate in theology in 1891. He was appointed professor of this institution in 1899, and served as rector magnificus four times.

In the 1930s, Kuyper wrote a number of articles perceived to be Nazi-friendly. He had no problem accepting members of the NSB as being sincere Christians. During World War II, he regarded the Nazi occupation as a "legal regime".

Academic offices
Preceded by G.H.J.W.J. Geesink	Rector Magnificus of the Vrije Universiteit Amsterdam; 1902-1903; 1909-1910; 1919-1920; 1930-1931	Succeeded by Herman Bavinck
Preceded by G.H.J.W.J. Geesink	Rector Magnificus of the Vrije Universiteit Amsterdam; 1902-1903; 1909-1910; 1919-1920; 1930-1931	Succeeded by Herman Bavinck
Preceded by G.H.J.W.J. Geesink	Rector Magnificus of the Vrije Universiteit Amsterdam; 1902-1903; 1909-1910; 1919-1920; 1930-1931	Succeeded by Robert Herman Woltjer
Preceded by Henk Pos	Rector Magnificus of the Vrije Universiteit Amsterdam; 1902-1903; 1909-1910; 1919-1920; 1930-1931	Succeeded by Herman Dooyeweerd
