= Willem Geesink =

Dutch theologian

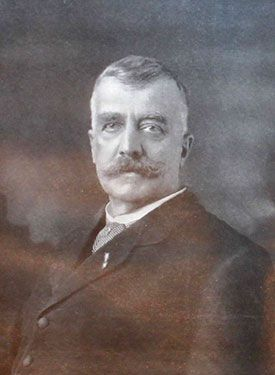
Willem Geesink

Gerhard Herman Johannes Wilhelm Jacobus Geesink (27 May 1854 – 23 January 1929), known as G. H. J. W. J. Geesink, or Willem Geesink, was a Dutch theologian. He served as professor at the Vrije Universiteit Amsterdam from 1890 to 1926, and was rector magnificus four times.

Geesink was by training a church historian, but taught philosophy, ethics, elenctics, and New Testament exegesis as well. Arie van Deursen notes that "as a philosopher he was simply in over his head," and wrote mainly in the field of theological ethics. Hans Schaeffer summarises his thought as follows:

The sovereign God created a moral world-order, which He imposes on the spiritual as well as on the natural world. For the spiritual world – which is the moral one – God's ordinances are his commandments.

Academic offices
Preceded by Jan Woltjer	Rector Magnificus of the Vrije Universiteit Amsterdam; 1896-1897; 1901-1902; 1908-1909; 1918-1919	Succeeded by Frederik Lodewijk Rutgers
Preceded by Jan Woltjer	Rector Magnificus of the Vrije Universiteit Amsterdam; 1896-1897; 1901-1902; 1908-1909; 1918-1919	Succeeded by Herman Huber Kuyper
Preceded by Jan Woltjer	Rector Magnificus of the Vrije Universiteit Amsterdam; 1896-1897; 1901-1902; 1908-1909; 1918-1919	Succeeded by Herman Huber Kuyper
Preceded by Frederik Willem Grosheide	Rector Magnificus of the Vrije Universiteit Amsterdam; 1896-1897; 1901-1902; 1908-1909; 1918-1919	Succeeded by Herman Huber Kuyper
