= Alexander de Savornin Lohman =

Dutch politician (1837–1924)

His Excellency Jonkheer Alexander de Savornin Lohman
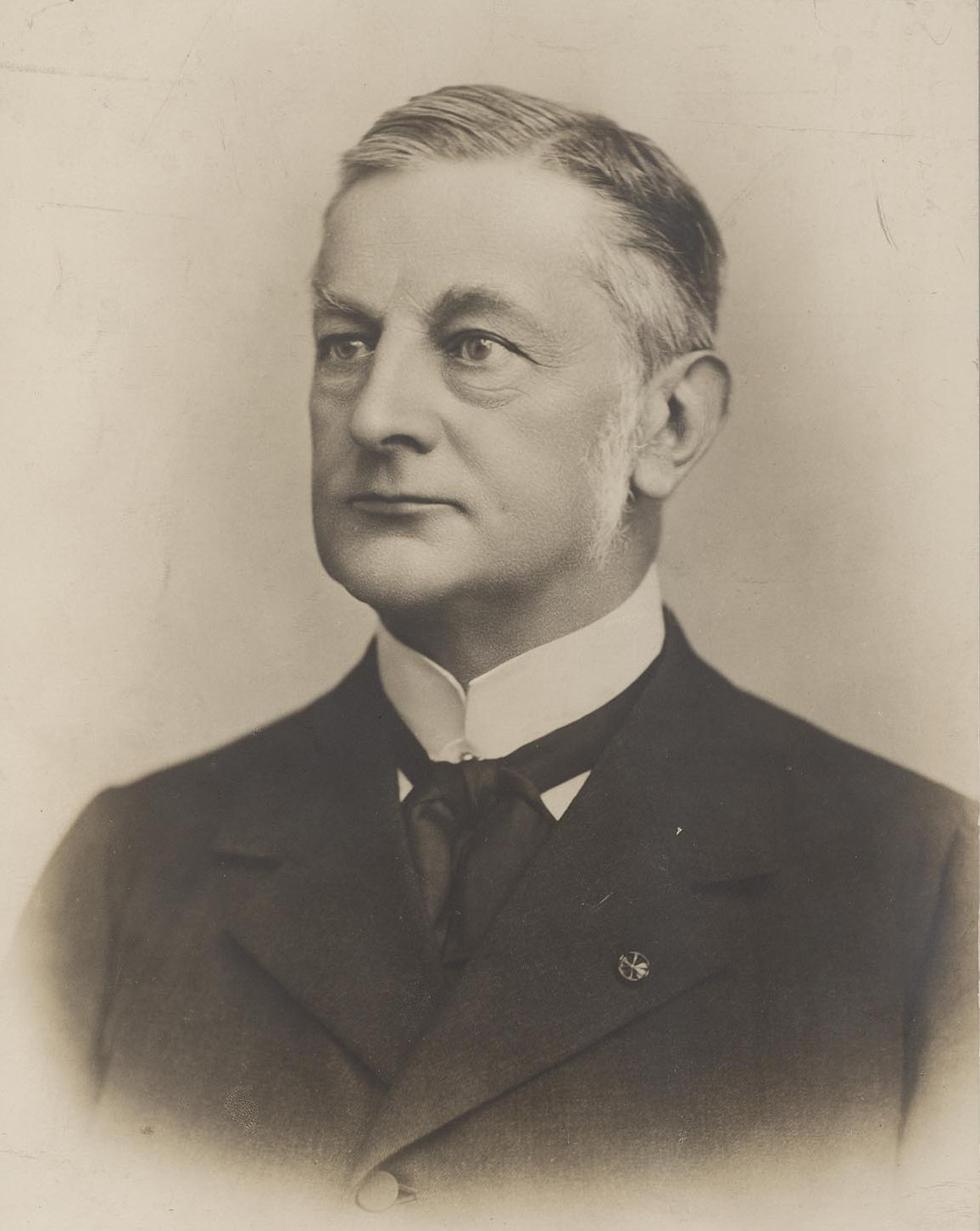
- Savornin Lohman in 1918

Minister of the Interior
- In office 24 February 1890 – 20 August 1891
- Preceded by: Baron Mackay
- Succeeded by: Johannes Tak van Poortvliet

Personal details
- Born: 29 May 1837 Groningen, Netherlands
- Died: 11 June 1924 (aged 87) The Hague, Netherlands
- Party: Christian Historical
- Education: University of Groningen
- Occupation: Lawyer

Jhr. Alexander Frederik de Savornin Lohman (29 May 1837 – 11 June 1924) was a Dutch politician and leader of the Christian Historical Union during the first quarter of the 20th century.

He was a member of the lower Dutch nobility and held the predicate of jonkheer. He was born into a family of Walloon Reformed extraction. During his studies he became a supporter of the anti-revolutionary cause of Guillaume Groen van Prinsterer and he was elected to the Dutch House of Representatives for the Anti-Revolutionary Party (ARP) in 1879. He remained a member of parliament until 1921. Throughout his career he would serve as member of the House of Representatives, member of the Senate and, for a short while, minister. He was noted for his vehement attacks against his opponents, but was generally considered to be receptive of the arguments of his peers.

De Savornin Lohman got involved in politics whilst serving as a judge at the court of 's-Hertogenbosch. There he became party to a conflict over Christian schools. He soon met Abraham Kuyper, another anti-revolutionary politician who would dominate Dutch politics in the years to come. When Kuyper was suffering from burnout in 1876 and 1877 De Savornin Lohman replaced him as chief editor of De Standaard, the anti-revolutionary newspaper. De Savornin Lohman went on, at times reluctantly, to become Kuyper's most important collaborator in his many projects (the school struggle, the foundation of the Anti-Revolutionary Party in 1879, the 1886 Dutch Reformed Church split and the creation of the Vrije Universiteit Amsterdam in 1879).

De Savornin Lohman's entry in politics coincided with the introduction of party discipline into Dutch politics. As an aristocrat De Savornin Lohman was torn between the opinion of his fellow aristocrats, who considered politics to be a personal thing, and the opinion of his leader and friend Kuyper, who found party discipline and the democratic process of the utmost importance. Further conflict ensued when De Savornin Lohman became Minister of the Interior, replacing Aeneas Mackay Jr., who in turn replaced Keuchenius as Minister of Colonial Affairs. The Dutch parliament had refused supply to Keuchenius's budget and Mackay wanted to save the government. Kuyper wanted to have a general election and sought the fall of the government. De Savornin Lohman and most of the Anti Revolutionary Party supported the government. Two factions in the ARP now emerged, one led by Kuyper the other by De Savornin Lohman. When the Liberal minister Johannes Tak van Poortvliet presented a proposal to introduce universal suffrage in 1893, this proved to be an especially divisive issue. The aristocrat De Savornin Lohman was against extension, while Kuyper saw an electoral advantage for the ARP. Universal suffrage would give the vote to orthodox Protestant farmers and small entrepreneurs (collectively referred to in Dutch political science as kleine luyden), who had hitherto been ineligible because of the minimum taxes requirement. When Kuyper managed to persuade ARP members to support his position, De Savornin Lohman's faction, the Free Anti Revolutionaries (VAR), became directly opposed to Kuyper's Anti-Revolutionaries. The conflict led to a split in the ARP with De Savornin Lohman and his largely aristocratic colleagues forming the smaller splinter group. In 1908, after a series of mergers with like-minded political groups, De Savornin Lohman and his VAR founded the Christian Historical Union (CHU).

Religiously, De Savornin Lohman, who was Reformed, was personally involved in the 1886 Dutch Reformed Church split, which was led by Kuyper. The schism was a reaction against the progressive practices of the Dutch Reformed Church and De Savornin Lohman went on to become a member of the newly founded Reformed Churches in the Netherlands. While Kuyper favoured cooperation with Roman Catholics in parliament, De Savornin Lohman and his fellow Anti-Revolutionaries were sceptical towards Roman Catholicism.

Professionally, De Savornin Lohman was employed by the Vrije Universiteit Amsterdam to teach law and a Reformed outlook on science. He twice served as rector magnificus of that institution. In 1895 the conflict with Kuyper forced him to resign his post. It was twenty years before the two gentlemen were on speaking terms again. In 1896 he became member of the Royal Netherlands Academy of Arts and Sciences, he resigned from the Academy in 1914.

In 1902 he acted as one of five arbitrators at The Hague in the Pious Fund of the Californias dispute between the United States and Mexico, the first dispute between states arbitrated by the Permanent Court of Arbitration. He also sat on the panel for the Sarvarkar Case in 1911.

Alexander de Savornin Lohman died in The Hague aged 87. He was an important adviser to Queen Wilhelmina.

House of Representatives of the Netherlands
| Preceded by Pieter Saaymans Vader | Member for Goes; 1879–1890; With: Jan Pieter Bredius 1879–1881; Jozef Pompe van Meerdervoort 1881–1886; Alexander Schimmelpenninck van der Oye 1886–1888 | Succeeded by Levinus Keuchenius |
| Preceded by Levinus Keuchenius | Member for Goes; 1894–1918 | District abolished |
Political offices
| Preceded by Æneas Mackay | Minister of the Interior; 1890–1891 | Succeeded by Johannes Tak van Poortvliet |
Academic offices
| Preceded by Jan Woltjer | Rector Magnificus of the Vrije Universiteit Amsterdam; 1886–1887; 1892-1893 | Succeeded by Abraham Kuyper |
| Preceded by Abraham Kuyper | Rector Magnificus of the Vrije Universiteit Amsterdam; 1886–1887; 1892-1893 | Succeeded by Frederik Lodewijk Rutgers |
