= Ben Bot =

Dutch politician and diplomat (born 1937)

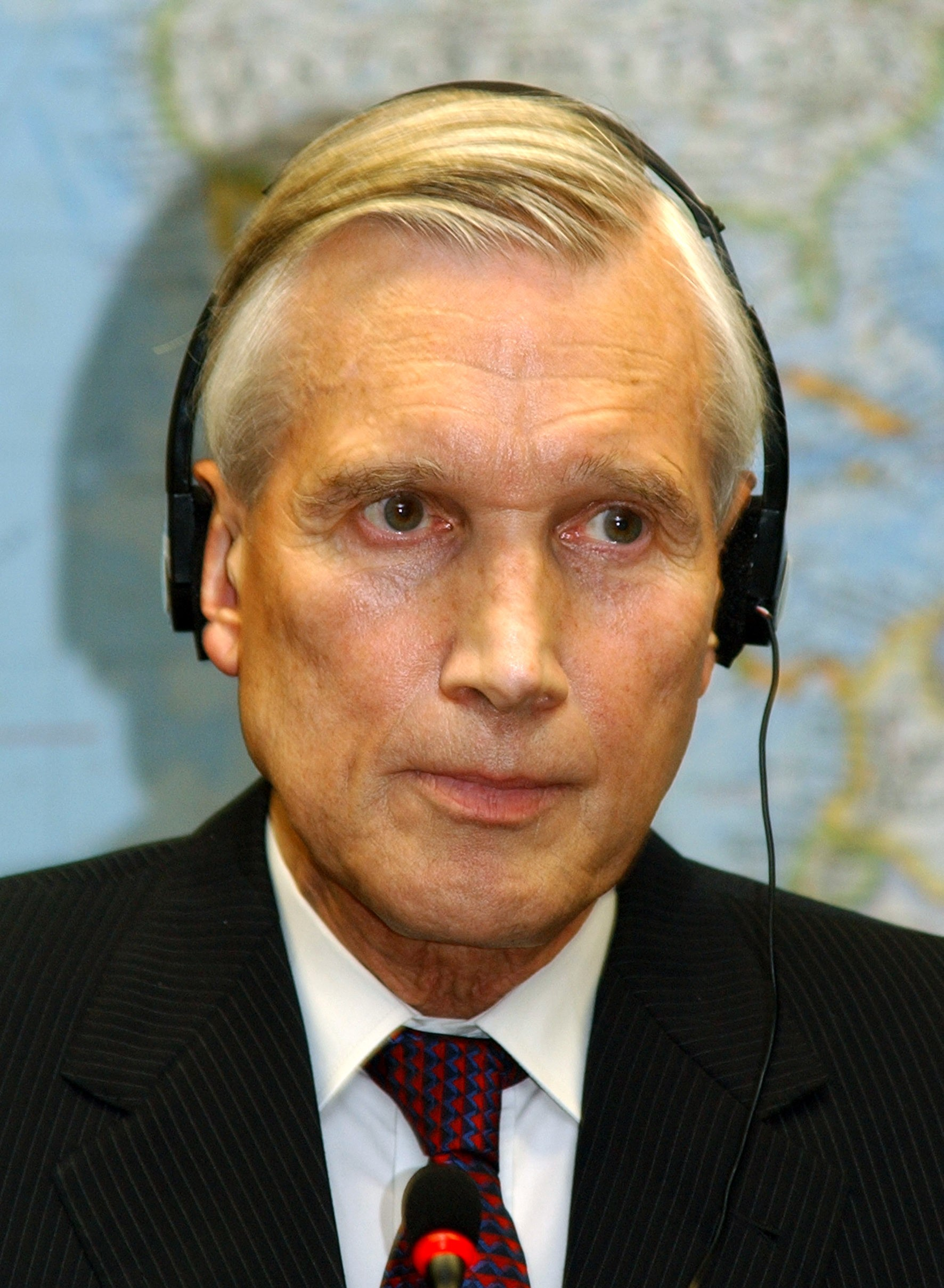
- Bot in 2007

Minister of Foreign Affairs
- In office 3 December 2003 – 22 February 2007
- Prime Minister: Jan Peter Balkenende
- Preceded by: Jaap de Hoop Scheffer
- Succeeded by: Maxime Verhagen

Permanent Representative of the Netherlands to the European Union
- In office 1 October 1992 – 1 January 2003
- Preceded by: Unknown
- Succeeded by: Tom de Bruijn

Ambassador of the Netherlands to Turkey
- In office 1 January 1986 – 1 January 1989
- Preceded by: Unknown
- Succeeded by: Unknown

Deputy Permanent Representative of the Netherlands to NATO
- In office 1 January 1982 – 1 January 1986
- Preceded by: Unknown
- Succeeded by: Unknown

Ambassador of the Netherlands to East Germany
- In office 30 January 1973 – 15 December 1976
- Preceded by: New title
- Succeeded by: Unknown

Personal details
- Born: Bernard Rudolf Bot; 21 November 1937 (age 88) Batavia, Dutch East Indies
- Party: Christian Democratic Appeal (from 1980)
- Other political affiliations: Catholic People's Party (until 1980)
- Domestic partner(s): Sybilla Dekker (since 2008)
- Children: 3 children
- Parent: Theo Bot (father)
- Education: Leiden University (Bachelor of Laws, Master of Laws, Doctor of Philosophy); Harvard University (Juris Doctor, Master of Laws)
- Occupation: Politician; diplomat; civil servant; nonprofit director; lobbyist

Bernard Rudolf "Ben" Bot (Dutch pronunciation: [ˈbɛrnɑrt ˈrydɔl(ə)v bɛm ˈbɔt]; born 21 November 1937) is a Dutch retired politician and diplomat. A member of the Christian Democratic Appeal (CDA), he served as Minister of Foreign Affairs from 2003 to 2007 in the second and third cabinet of Jan Peter Balkenende. A career ambassador, he succeeded then-Minister of Foreign Affairs Jaap de Hoop Scheffer who resigned to become Secretary General of NATO.

== Early life and education ==
Bot was born in Batavia, Dutch East Indies (now Jakarta, Indonesia). The son of Theo Bot who served as Minister of Education, Culture and Science and Minister for Development Cooperation. He studied at the Leiden University where he earned an L.L.M. and a Ph.D. degree in law, and attended subsequently The Hague Academy of International Law and Harvard Law School (Cambridge, Massachusetts, United States) where he received a second L.L.M. degree from the latter.

== Politics ==
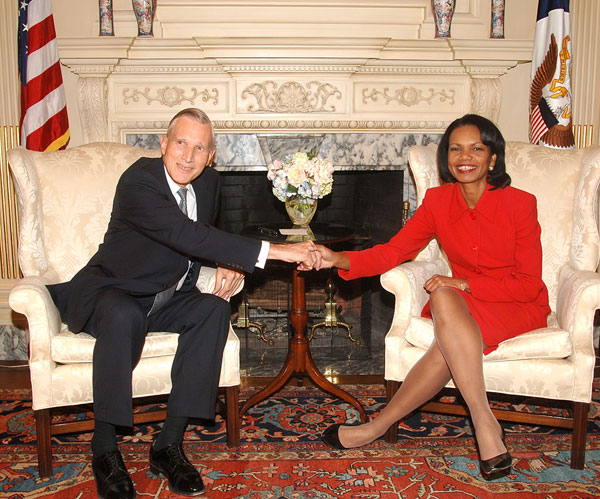
Ben Bot with then United States Secretary of State Condoleezza Rice in 2006.

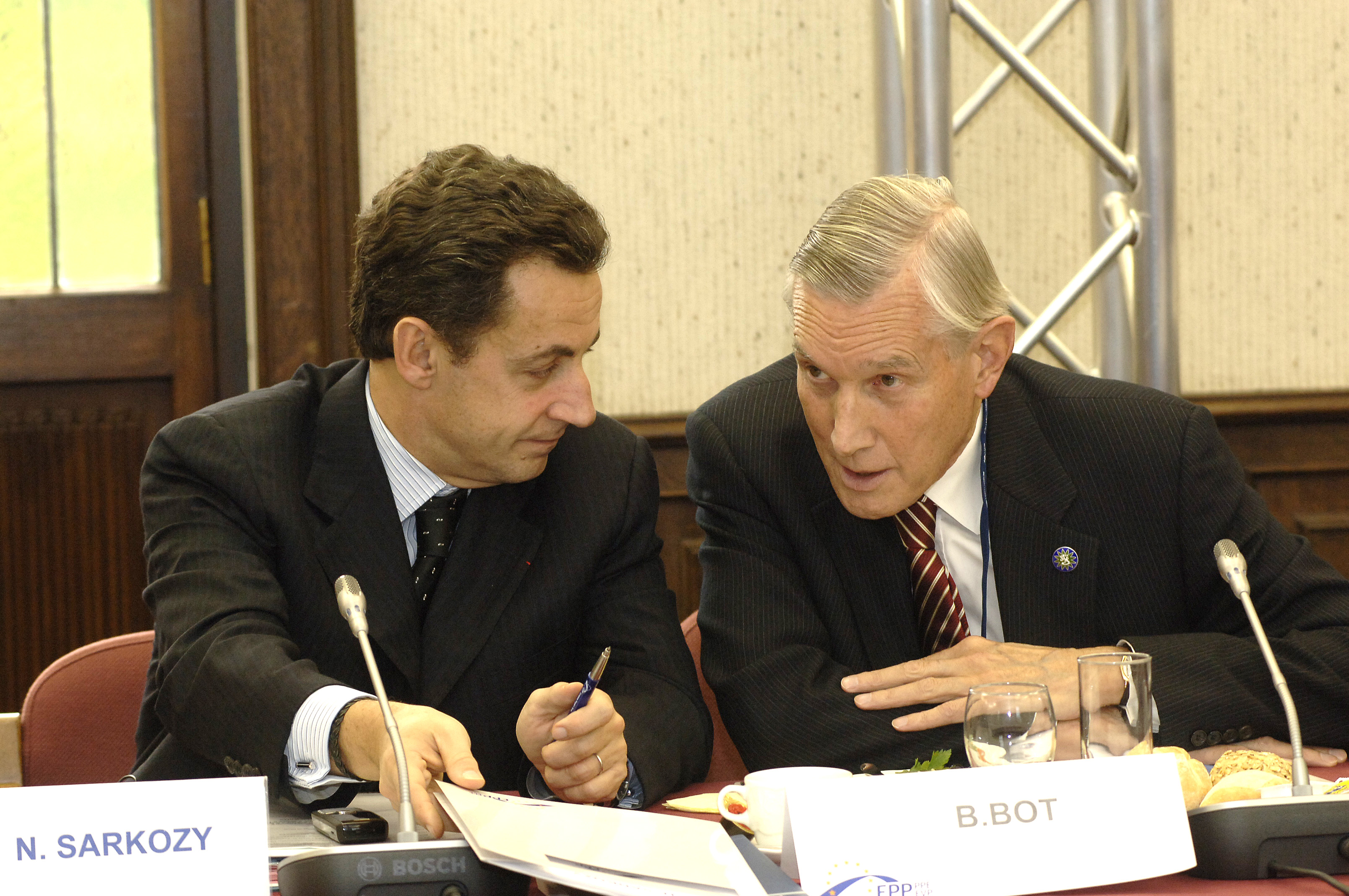
Ben Bot with then French Minister of the Interior Nicolas Sarkozy in 2006.

He served in the Ministry of Foreign Affairs from 1963 to 2002, including postings at the Permanent Representation of the Netherlands to the European Community from 1964 to 1970, the Netherlands embassy in Buenos Aires to 1973, and at the embassy in former East-Berlin in the DDR. In the period 1976–1982 he worked in the Netherlands for the Ministry of Foreign Affairs in The Hague, after which he was Deputy Permanent Representative of the Netherlands to the North Atlantic Treaty Organization (NATO) in Brussels.

From 1986 to 1989, Bot was Ambassador of the Netherlands to Turkey. He served as Secretary-General of the Ministry of Foreign Affairs in The Hague until 1992, when he was appointed as Permanent Representative of the Netherlands to the European Union in Brussels. He held that post for an unusually long period of 10 years.

On 3 December 2003, Bot succeeded former NATO Secretary-General Jaap de Hoop Scheffer as Minister of Foreign Affairs in the second Balkenende cabinet. Bot is a member of the Christen Democratisch Appèl (CDA) party. In February 2007 he was succeeded as foreign minister by Maxime Verhagen in the fourth Balkenende cabinet. Currently, Bot is a partner of the Praaning Meines Consultancy Group and holds various public posts including President of the Netherlands Institute for Multiparty Democracy and Chairman of the Board of the Clingendael Institute in The Hague.

== Political positions ==
Bot voiced concern over the 2006 Lebanon War. Bot has expressed "understanding for Israel's reaction" but said "it would be hard to support Israel in case there will be many civilian casualties".

Bot was interviewed by the NRC Handelsblad newspaper in December 2007, where he reiterated his 2005 position that the 2003 invasion of Iraq was a mistake, and that he had to "redress" his comment in 2005 after heavy pressure from prime minister Jan Peter Balkenende. In response, Balkenende said that he would have asked Bot to step down if he did not revise his position at the time.

== Other activities ==
- European Bank for Reconstruction and Development (EBRD), Ex-Officio Alternate Member of the Board of Governors (2003-2007)

== Decorations ==
Honours
Ribbon bar	Honour	Country	Date	Comment
	Officer of the Order of Orange-Nassau	Netherlands	10 December 1985	
	Knight of the Order of the Netherlands Lion	Netherlands	30 April 1993	
	Silver Medal of Honor of the Order of the Three Stars	Latvia	2008	
	Commander's Cross of the Order of Merit	Poland	29 June 2012	

Political offices
Preceded by Jaap de Hoop Scheffer	Minister of Foreign Affairs; 2003–2007	Succeeded by Maxime Verhagen
Civic offices
Preceded by Eduard Jacobs	Secretary-General of the Ministry of Foreign Affairs; 1988–1991	Succeeded by Dirk van den Berg
Non-profit organization positions
Preceded by Jos van Kemenade	Chairman of the Institute for Multiparty Democracy; 2007–2018	Succeeded by Eimert van Middelkoop
Preceded by Hans van den Broek	Chairman of the Netherlands Institute of International; Relations Clingendael; 2007–2015	Succeeded by Paul van der Heijden
Preceded by Hans van den Broek	Chairman of the Netherlands Carnegie Foundation; 2007–present	Incumbent
Preceded by Hans van den Broek	Chairman of Radio Netherlands Worldwide; 2008–2016	Succeeded by Theo Huibers
