= Cees Datema =

Dutch academic (1944–2004)

Cees "Cornelis" Datema (1944–2004) was a Dutch academic with special focus on Latin and Greek and the preaching of the early church fathers. He obtained his PhD from Vrije Universiteit of Amsterdam in 1970 and his original thesis on Asterius of Amasea is still used in teaching the subject today. From 1987 to 1993 he was the Rector Magnificus of Vrije Universiteit Amsterdam following which he joined the board of the Open University of Amsterdam as its chairman.

Next to his academic work and publications, he was also very involved with the implementation of reforming legislation for higher education MUB-Act adopted in 1997 through leading the Datema commission in 1998.

Cees Datema was born in 1944 in Oudehorne in the Netherlands, lived for many years in Woerden before he retired to Amsterdam, where he died in 2004.

== Publications ==
1974: UNE HOMÉLIE INÉDITE SUR L'ASCENSION

1978: Amphilochii Iconiensis Opera : orationes, pluraque alia quae supersunt, nonnulla etiam spuria

1982: AN UNEDITED HOMILY OF PS. CHRYSOSTOM ON THE BIRTH OF JOHN THE BAPTIST

1983: ANOTHER UNEDITED HOMILY OF PS. CHRYSOSTOM ON THE BIRTH OF JOHN THE BAPTIST

1984: Kerkvaders : teksten met toelichting uit de vroege kerk

1985: A Supposed Narratio on Job

1986: A Homily on John the Baptist attributed to Aetius, presbyter of Constantinople AN UNEDITED HOMILY OF PS. CHRYSOSTOM ON THOMAS

1987: De stamelende orator

1988: Towards a Critical Edition of the Greek Homilies of Severian of Gabala AN ENCOMIUM OF LEONTIUS MONACHUS ON THE BIRTHDAY OF JOHN THE BAPTIST Leontius, Presbyter of Constantinople –: An Edifying Entertainer

1989: Paasfeest : vroegchristelijke preken uit de paastijd

1990: Vroeg-christelijke prediking
