= Judiciary of the Netherlands =

Court system of the Netherlands

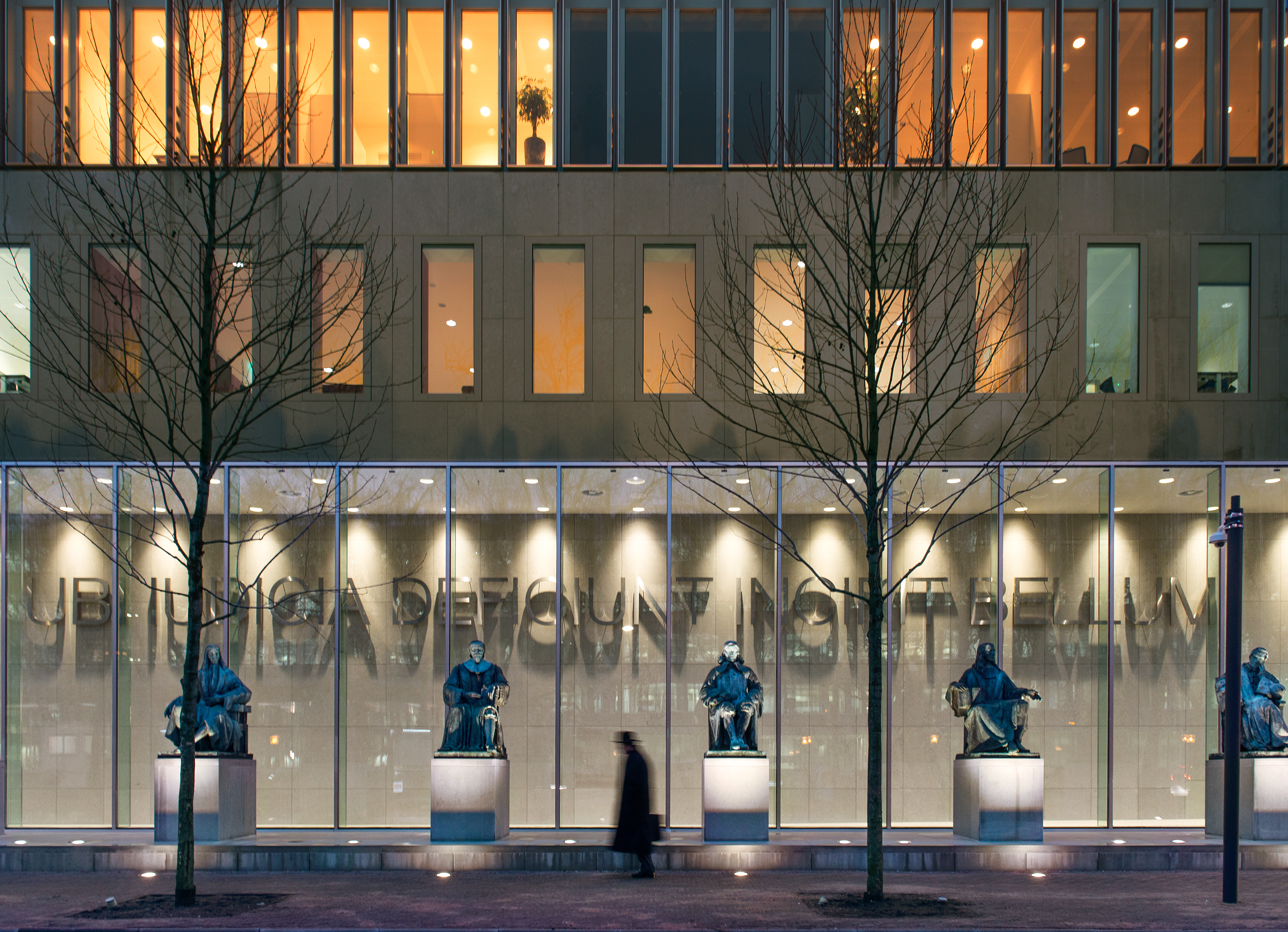
New Supreme Court building, The Hague

The Judiciary of the Netherlands is the system of courts which interprets and applies the law in the Netherlands.

The court system follows the traditional hierarchical pattern. It is largely based on that of France: the state rather than the individual initiates legal proceedings and Administrative justice is dealt with separately from civil or criminal justice. In the Netherlands, there is also no jury system. The judiciary is independent and judges can only be removed from office for malfeasance or incapacity.

== District Courts ==
There are 11 District Courts in the country, each divided into a maximum of five sections. The sections always include the administrative section, civil section, criminal section and sub-district section, but family and juvenile cases are often put into a separate fifth section. Cases are heard by a single judge.

In cases of civil law, matters of rents, hire purchase and employment are dealt with by a sub-district judge. In criminal cases, minor offences are also dealt with by a sub-district judge, who usually delivers an oral judgment immediately after the hearing.

More intricate cases can be heard by a single judge or by a bench of three judges, depending on the complexity or seriousness of the case.

=== Netherlands Commercial Court ===
The Netherlands Commercial Court (NCC) was created on 1 January 2019. The NCC District Court is a chamber in the Amsterdam District Court. A matter may generally be submitted to the NCC where all of the following requirements are met: (i) the action is a civil or commercial matter within the autonomy of the parties and is not subject to the jurisdiction of the Sub-district Court or the exclusive jurisdiction of any other Dutch chamber or court; (ii) the matter concerns an international dispute; (iii) the parties to the proceedings have designated the Amsterdam District Court as the forum to hear their case or the Amsterdam District Court has jurisdiction to hear the action on other grounds; and (iv) the parties to the proceedings have expressly agreed in writing that court proceedings will be before the NCC in English.

== Courts of Appeal ==
There are four Courts of Appeal: The Hague, Amsterdam, Arnhem-Leeuwarden and 's-Hertogenbosch.

They deal with appeals from the District Courts, re-examining the case and giving their own verdict. In addition to criminal and civil cases, the Courts of Appeal also deal with appeals against tax assessments in their capacity as Administrative Courts. Their decision may be contested by appealing in cassation (i.e. for the verdict to be overturned) to the Supreme Court of the Netherlands.

== Supreme Court ==
Located in the Hague, the Supreme Court of the Netherlands (Dutch: Hoge Raad der Nederlanden) is the highest court in the Netherlands for civil, criminal and tax law cases. It also deals with appeals from the Joint Court of Justice of the Netherlands Antilles and Aruba. It has some 35 judges.

== Special Administrative Tribunals and Administrative Supreme Court ==
There are three special tribunals in the Netherlands that deal in specific areas of administrative law:

- The Central Appeals Tribunal is based in Utrecht and deals with matters of social security and the civil service.
- The Trade and Industry Appeals Tribunal is based in the Hague and deals with the area of social-economic administrative law and with appeals regarding specific laws, such as the Competition Act or the Telecommunications Act.
- The Administrative Jurisdiction Division of the Council of State is based in the Hague and hears appeals by members of the public, associations or commercial companies against decisions by municipal, provincial or central governmental bodies.

== See also ==
- Law of the Netherlands
- Law firms of the Netherlands
