= Arie van Deursen =

Dutch historian

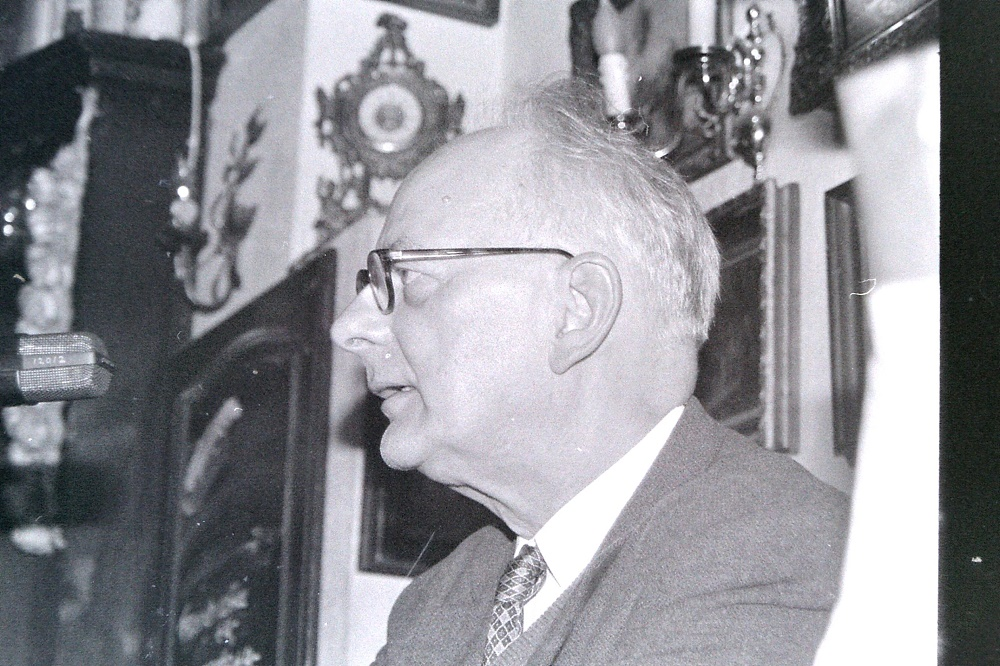
Arie van Deursen (2002)

Arie Theodorus van Deursen (23 June 1931 – 21 November 2011) was a Dutch historian whose focus was the early modern period. He was professor emeritus of History at the Vrije Universiteit in Amsterdam. He was a specialist in Dutch history of the 16th and 17th century.

== Career ==
Arie van Deursen was born at Groningen. He was a prolific author with a refined style. He has written several books about daily life in the Dutch Golden Age, religious controversies in the 16th and 17th century (Jacobus Arminius versus Franciscus Gomarus) and the political situation of that period; he wrote biographies of William the Silent and Maurice of Nassau, Prince of Orange, a history of the Vrije Universiteit, a history of the Netherlands (1555–1702), a biography of Michiel de Ruyter and several volumes of collected essays.

As an orthodox Protestant Christian, Van Deursen was heavily involved in polemics about the history of secularization and its consequences. In his Huizinga Lecture, Huizinga en de geest der eeuw (Huizinga and the spirit of the age) Van Deursen compared the critical evaluation of the secularization by Isaäc da Costa and Johan Huizinga. Van Deursen died in Oegstgeest on 21 November 2011, aged 80.

He was member of the Royal Netherlands Academy of Arts and Sciences.

== Books (Dutch) ==
- Professions et métiers interdits: Un aspect de l'histoire de la révocation de l'Édit de Nantes, Groningen: Wolters, 1960 (doctoral thesis)
- Honni soit qui mal y pense? De Republiek tussen de mogendheden (1610–1612), Amsterdam: Noord-Hollandsche Uitgevers Maatschappij, 1965
- Bavianen en slijkgeuzen: Kerk en kerkvolk ten tijde van Maurits en Oldenbarnevelt, Assen: Van Gorcum, 1974 (ISBN 9051941854)
- Mensen van klein vermogen: Het kopergeld van de Gouden Eeuw, Amsterdam: Bert Bakker, 1991 (ISBN 9035110110). Translated into English: Plain lives in the Golden Age. Popular culture, religion and society in seventeenth-century Holland. Cambridge: Cambridge University Press, 1991.
  - Volume 1, Het dagelijks brood
  - Volume 2, Volkscultuur
  - Volume 3, Volk en overheid
  - Volume 4, Hel en hemel
- Een dorp in de polder: Graft in de zeventiende eeuw, Amsterdam: Bert Bakker, 1994
- Willem van Oranje: een biografisch portret, Amsterdam: Bert Bakker, 1995
- De Bataafse revolutie (1795–1995), Apeldoorn: Willem de Zwijgerstichting, 1995
- Geleefd geloven: geschiedenis van de protestantse vroomheid in Nederland (coauthor: G.J. Schutte), Assen: Van Gorcum, 1996
- Maurits van Nassau, 1567-1625: de winnaar die faalde, Amsterdam: Bert Bakker, 2000
- Rust niet voordat gy ze van buiten kunt: de Tien Geboden in de 17e eeuw, Kampen: De Groot Goudriaan, 2004
- De last van veel geluk: De geschiedenis van Nederland 1555-1702, Amsterdam: Bert Bakker, 2004 (ISBN 9035126270)
- Een hoeksteen in het verzuilde bestel: De Vrije Universiteit 1880-2005, Amsterdam: Bert Bakker, 2005 (ISBN 9035128672)
- De admiraal: De wereld van Michiel Adriaenszoon de Ruyter, Franeker: Van Wijnen, 2007 (ISBN 9789051942828)
- In Katwijk is alles anders. Een christelijk dorp ontmoet de wereld, 1940-2005. Amsterdam: Uitgeverij Bert Bakker, 2011.
