= Hortus Botanicus =

Hortus botanicus is a Latin term for botanical garden. It may refer to:

- Hortus Botanicus Leiden
- Hortus Botanicus Amsterdam
- Hortus Botanicus Vrije Universiteit Amsterdam
