= Stupid sort =

Stupid sort may refer to:

- Bogosort, based on the generate and test paradigm
- Gnome sort, similar to insertion sort
