= Vrije Universiteit Amsterdam =

University in Amsterdam, Netherlands

Coordinates: 52°20′02″N 4°51′54″E

- Vrije Universiteit Amsterdam
- Seal: Maiden in the Garden
- Latin: Universitas Libera (Reformata Amstelodamensis)
- Motto: Auxilium nostrum in nomine Domini (Latin)
- Motto in English: Our help is in the name of the Lord
- Type: Public
- Established: 1880; 146 years ago
- Affiliations: Aurora; EUA; Santander; AACSB
- Endowment: € 798.1 million
- President: Margrethe Jonkman
- Rector: Jeroen Geurts
- Faculty: 2,976 (2.263 fte)
- Administrative staff: 1,662 (1,410 fte)
- Students: 31,548
- Location: Amsterdam, North Holland, Netherlands
- Campus: Urban
- Newspaper: Advalvas (Independent)
- Colors: VU Blue
- Website: vu.nl
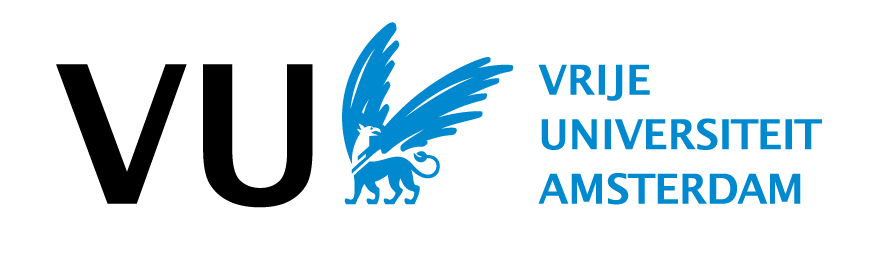

The Vrije Universiteit Amsterdam (Note: From September 2015 onwards, the correct name being used in both national and international context is "Vrije Universiteit Amsterdam". Previous names as "VU University", "VU University Amsterdam", or "VUA" are no longer in use since 2015.) (abbreviated as VU Amsterdam or simply VU when in context) is a public research university in Amsterdam, Netherlands, founded in 1880. The VU Amsterdam is one of two large, publicly funded research universities in the city, the other being the University of Amsterdam (UvA). The literal translation of the Dutch name Vrije Universiteit is "Free University". "Free" refers to independence of the university from both the State and the Dutch Reformed Church. Both within and outside the university, the institution is commonly referred to as "the VU". Although founded as a private institution, the VU has received government funding on a parity basis with public universities since 1970. The university is located on a compact urban campus in the southern Buitenveldert neighbourhood of Amsterdam and adjacent to the modern Zuidas business district.

As of June 2026, the VU has 31,548 registered students, most of whom were full-time students. As of October 2021, the university had 2,263 faculty members and researchers, and 1,410 administrative, clerical and technical employees, based on FTE units. The university's annual endowment for 2024 was circa €798 million. About two thirds of this endowment is government funding; the remainder is made up of tuition fees, research grants, and private funding.

The official university seal is entitled The Virgin in the Garden. Personally chosen by Abraham Kuyper, the Reformed-Protestant leader and founder of the university, it depicts a virgin living in freedom in a garden while pointing towards God, referring to the Protestant Reformation in the Netherlands in the 16th and 17th century. In 1990, the university adopted the mythical griffin as its common emblem.

== History ==
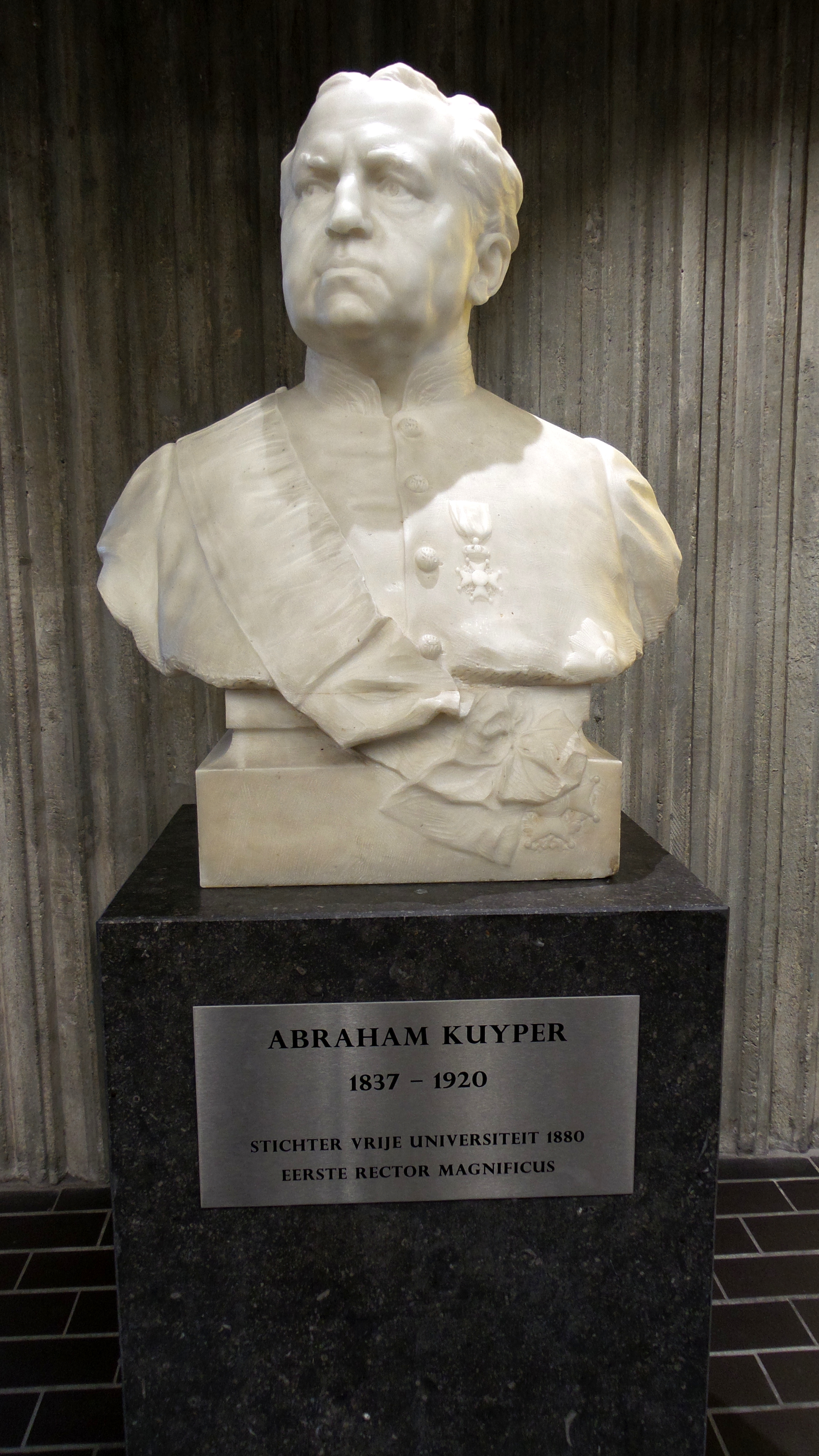
Bust of Abraham Kuyper, founder of the VU, in the Main Building

=== Origins (1880) ===
The VU was founded in 1880 by a group of Calvinists led by Abraham Kuyper as the first Protestant university in the Netherlands. Kuyper was a theologian, journalist, politician, and prime minister of the Netherlands from 1901 to 1905. He was a professor of theology at VU as well as the university's first rector magnificus (academic president). Kuyper's worldview and philosophy is referred to as Neo-Calvinism. As a reflection of his beliefs, Vrije Universiteit literally means 'Free University' (or 'Liberated University') to signify independence from both government and church. Teaching at the Vrije Universiteit started in 1880 in a few rooms rented at the Scottish Missionary Church (now the Kleine Komedie theatre), along the Amstel river in Amsterdam's city centre. Here, Kuyper and four fellow professors began lecturing in three faculties: theology, law, and the arts.

=== Expansion (1900s–1960s) ===
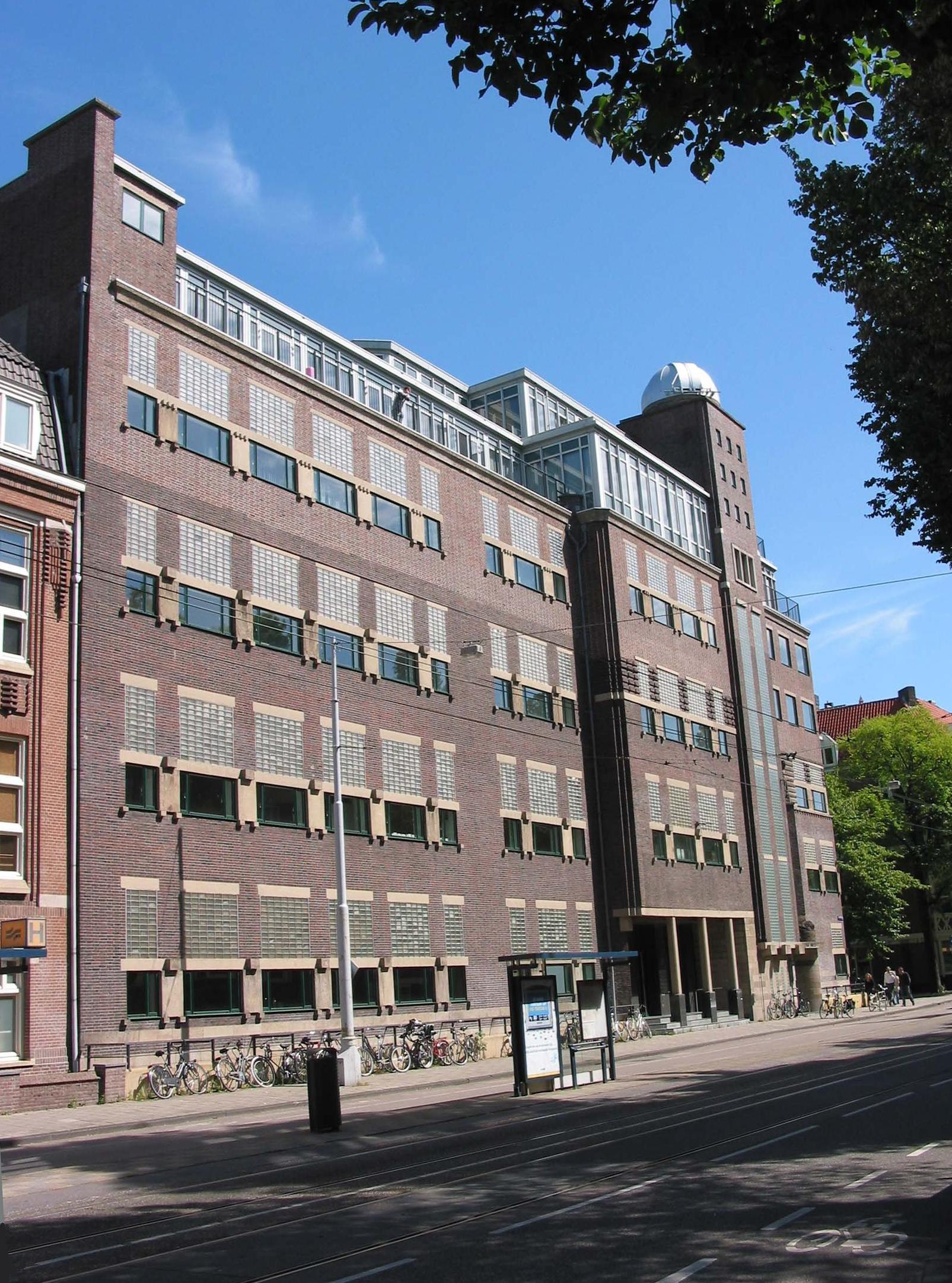
Former Chemistry Laboratory (1932) at De Lairessestraat

In 1884, the Scottish Missionary Church became too small for the growing number of students and the university bought its first building, located at Keizersgracht 162. In the following years, the university acquired more buildings throughout the city. In 1905, VU was formally accredited and granted the legal right to award academic degrees. New faculties were subsequently added to the original three, including a science faculty (1930) and a medical faculty (1950).

Funding for the university was provided through the VU Association, an organization founded by Abraham Kuyper which was firmly rooted within the Calvinist community in the Netherlands. By the end of the 1960s, the university received financial support from more than 200,000 private contributors. Many were making small coin donations collected by some 10,000 (mostly female) fundraisers, who were going door to door with the quintessential green VU collecting box.

=== Change (1970s-2000s) ===
It was in the end of the 1960s and into the 1970s, that the university's profile changed significantly in many respects. From 1968 onwards, the university relocated from Amsterdam's city centre to a new, functional campus in the southern Buitenveldert neighbourhood. In order to strengthen academic research, university administrators decided to apply for public funding on parity with public universities, which is guaranteed under the Dutch constitution, and no longer opposed admitting non-Protestant professors and students. As a result, the number of students grew substantially. Against the background of increasing student activism at universities around the world, new student organizations were formed demanding a more democratic academic culture at VU. By the end of the 1970s, the small, elitist Christian institution had all but disappeared and had become a broad, research-oriented university, open to students of diverse backgrounds.

=== Expansion and reform (2000s–present) ===
Student numbers continued to grow rapidly in the 21st century: from 15,700 students in 2002 to about 25,000 in 2011, causing growing pains which have resulted in lower student satisfaction and budgetary constraints. The university has embarked on a reform agenda, including a large-scale renewal of campus facilities, austerity programmes and staff reorganizations, which in turn were met with opposition and legal action from trade unions as well as a newly formed grassroots movement of staff and students.

== Campus and academic life ==
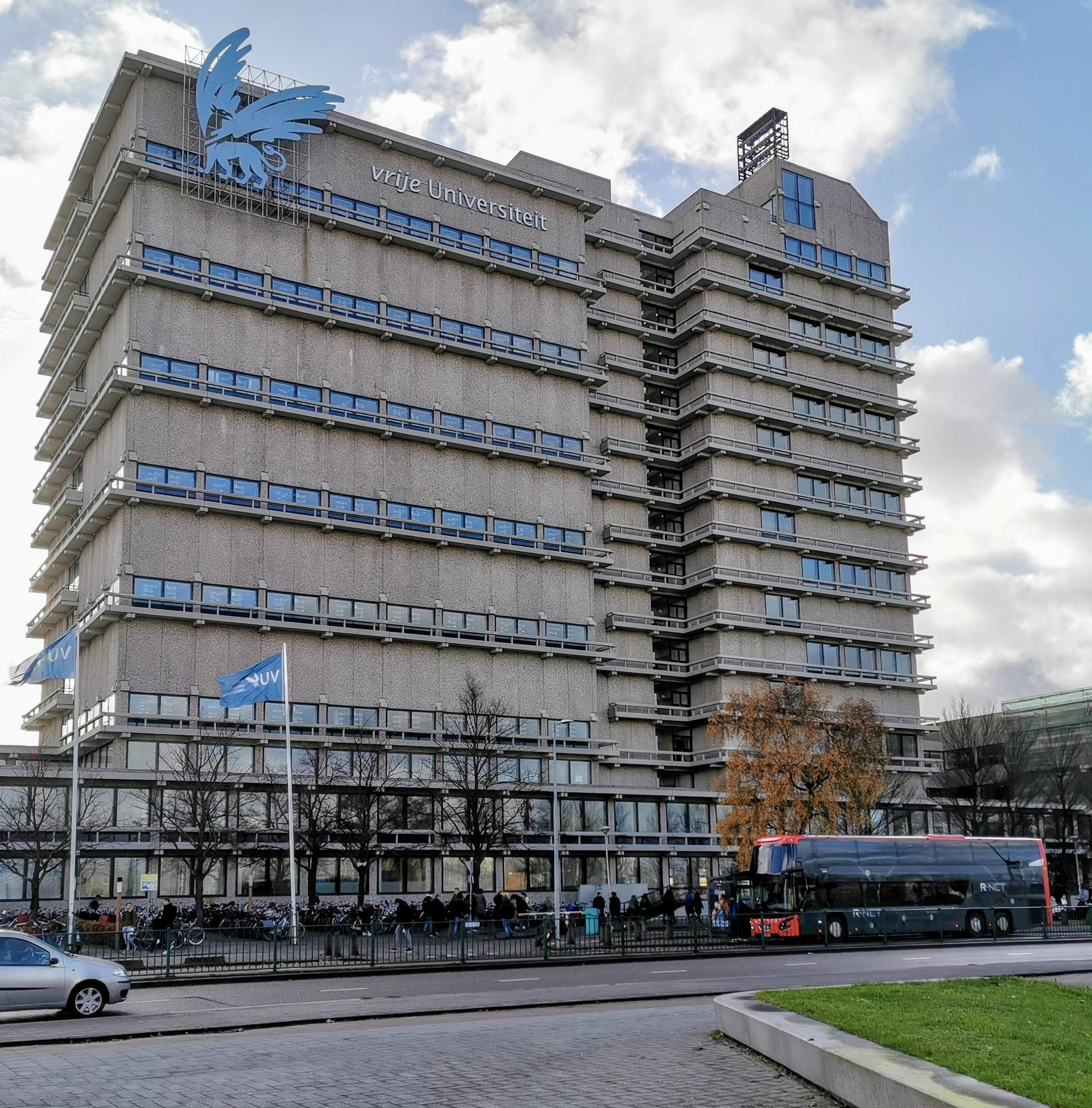
The upper floors of the Main Building's eastern wing, housing library stacks and showing the university emblem

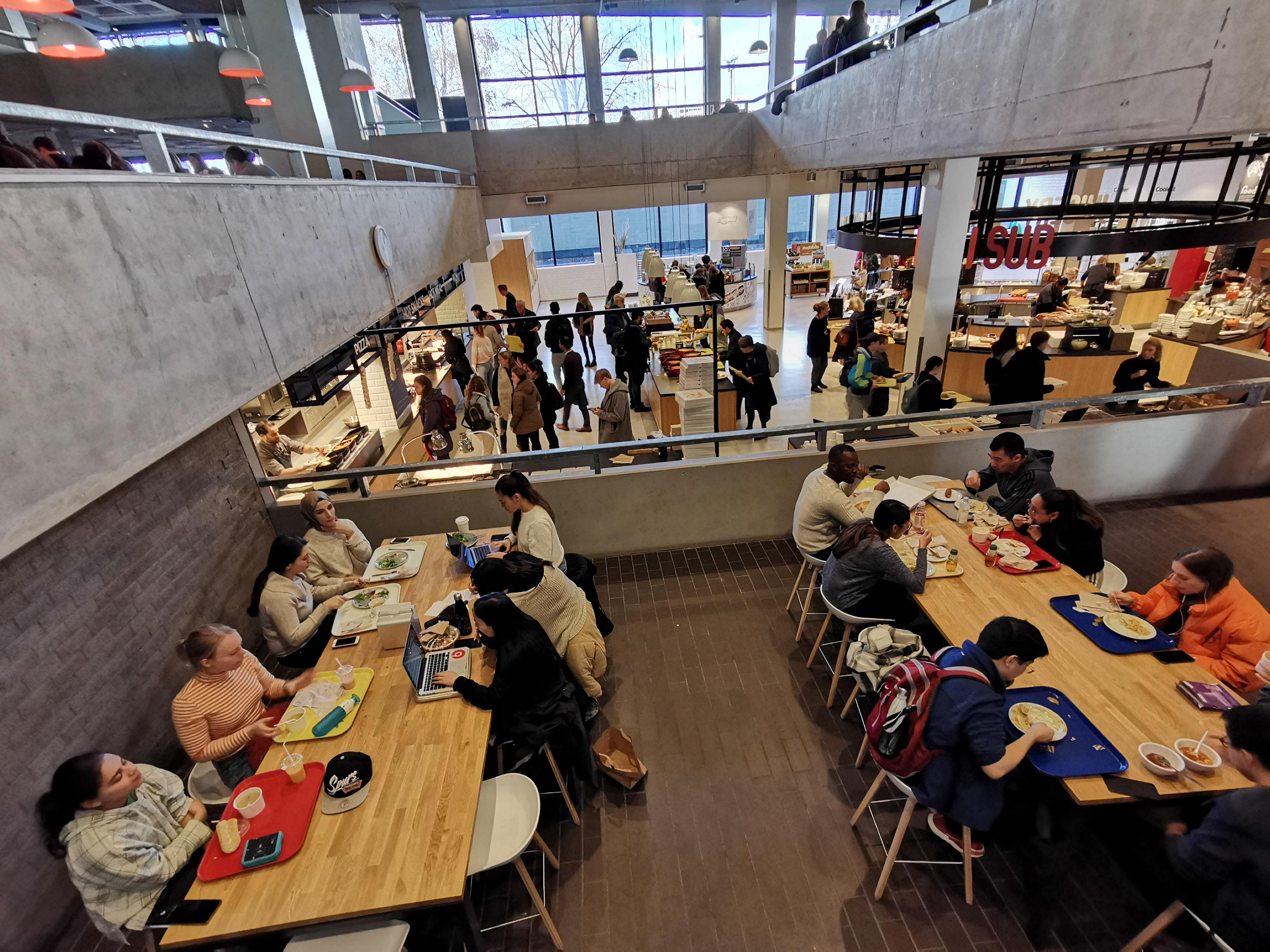
The main building has an inhouse restaurant serving pizzas, pasta, sandwiches and soup.

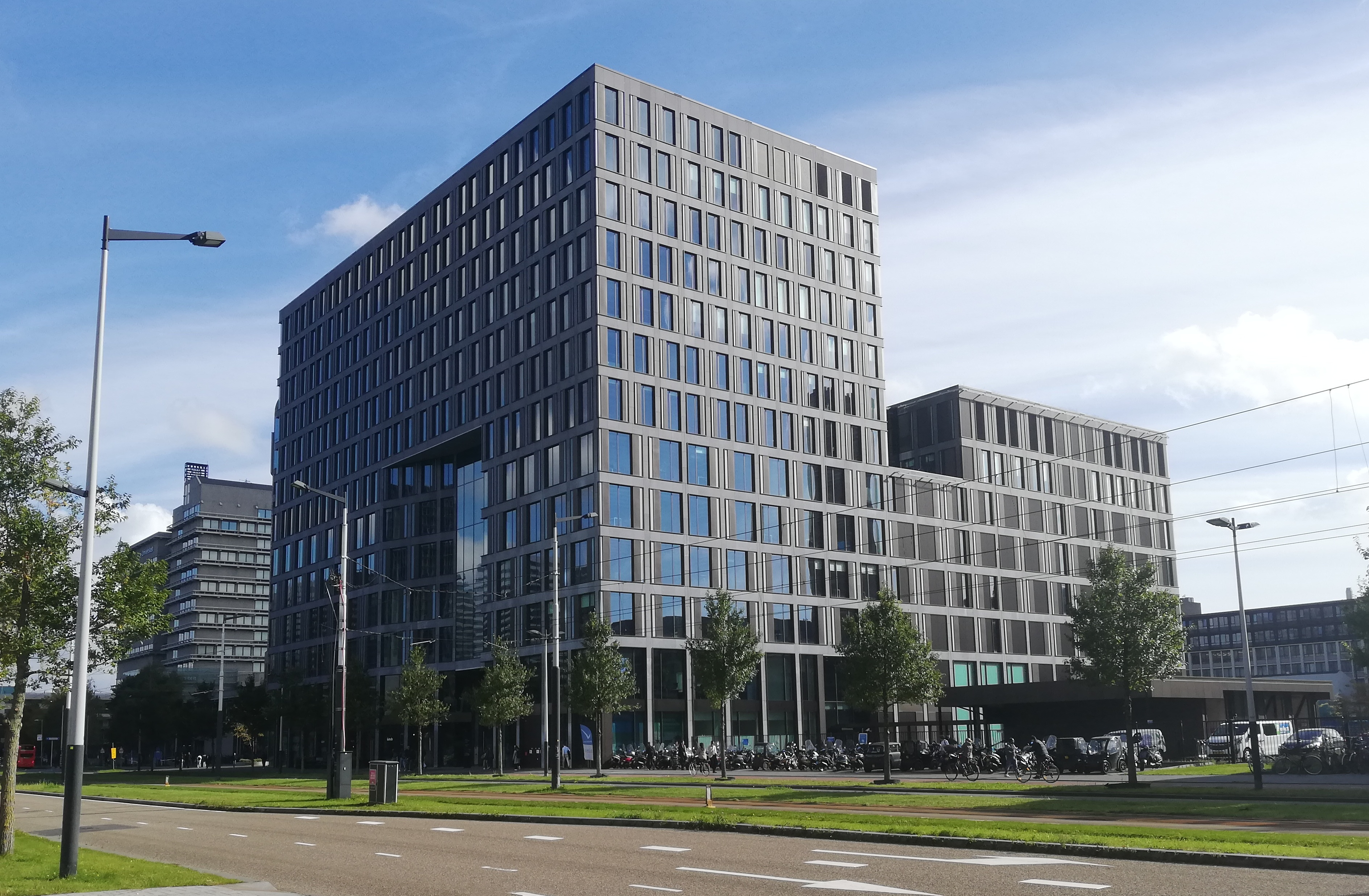
New University Building

=== Buitenveldert ===
The university's main campus and medical centre are situated in the Buitenveldert neighbourhood, part of the southern district of Amsterdam. The campus occupies about 0.4 km^{2} (0.15 sq mi) and is built along the 'De Boelelaan', a large east–west thoroughfare. Initially a fairly isolated location surrounded mostly by fields, the campus is now adjacent to the modern Zuidas business district housing some of the largest banks, accounting and law firms in the Netherlands. The VU campus is served by the 51 metro line as well as a number of tram lines and bus routes. It is also within walking distance of the Amsterdam Zuid railway station.

The university's Main Building ('Hoofdgebouw' or HG), established in 1973, is located at the intersection of the Boelelaan and the Buitenveldertselaan. In the early 2010s, the sixteen-story building underwent major renovation works. The Main Building is home to the faculties of Arts, Social Science, Philosophy, Economics and Business, and Theology. The University Library occupies five floors as well as several floors with closed stacks. In addition, the Main Building houses the Aula (main auditorium), the university restaurant, several kiosks, a fair trade store, and the VU bookstore.

On the south side, the Main Building provides access to the campus square ('Campusplein'). Many student organizations have their offices along the campus square entrance. South of the square is the Sciences Building ('Wis- en Natuurkundegebouw' or W&N), another 1970s building. The W&N is housing the faculties of Sciences and Earth and Life Sciences. In the middle of campus square is The Basket, the university bar, as well as a number of volleyball fields. Recent additions to the campus square area include a campus supermarket and an Italian coffeehouse. Also adjacent to the campus square is the modern building of the Institute for Health and Welness, which has been nicknamed the Red Potato after its distinct shape and color.

Along the Buitenveldertselaan is the Initium Building, housing the Faculty of Law. The arch-shaped building, opened in 2010, now forms the eastern entrance of the VU campus. The Faculty of Social Sciences is located in the Metropolitan Building, technically just off-campus, on the other side of the Buitenveldertselaan. The medical faculty is located on west end of campus, adjacent to the sprawling Amsterdam UMC, location VUmc.

In 2018, the New University Building was opened hosting teaching and research spaces as well as two caffès, an exhibition space, and a film screening space.

=== Uilenstede ===
The satellite campus 'Uilenstede' is located further south, in the municipality of Amstelveen. Uilenstede, built mainly between 1966 and 1970, is home to several large student housing complexes and apartment buildings and the VU Sports Centre. and a campus café. Several of the university's administrative departments are also located at the Uilenstede campus. Uilenstede is served by tram 25 and tram 5. Many of the residential halls at Uilenstede are currently undergoing major renovation works. A new apartment complex for visiting staff and international PhD students on the eastern side of the campus was opened in 2012. The new building was awarded the municipality's architecture prize. A large renovation of the public space, made possible with a grant from the Schiphol Foundation, started in September 2013 and includes the construction of three new squares at the campus.

== Organizational structure ==
The Vrije Universiteit is made up of several faculties, responsible for teaching and research, as well as a number of interdisciplinary research institutes. As of 2015, after a number of mergers, these faculties are: Behavioural and Movement Sciences; ACTA Dentistry; Earth and Life Sciences; School of Business and Economics; Humanities; Law; Sciences; Social Sciences; Theology; and the VUmc School of Medical Sciences.

The Vrije Universiteit is formally a private institution, part of the VU-VUmc Foundation. The other main institution within this foundation is the VU University Medical Center, which has a separate management structure.

The university is governed by the Executive Board, consisting of a president, a vice-president and a rector. The Executive Board has general management responsibilities and appoints the deans and professors of the faculties. The Executive Board is accountable to a Supervisory Board, appointed by the members' assembly of the VU Association, a private organization which founded the university in 1880.

The university's Works Council, a body of elected representatives of faculty and staff, as well as the Student Council, have consultation and co-decision rights in some areas of university policy and management. The College of Deans, consisting of all faculty deans and chaired by the rector, acts as a coordinating and consulting body at the central level and is responsible for awarding doctoral degrees and honorary doctorates.

== Academic profile ==
Teaching is organized within the several faculties. Together, the faculties offer 50 bachelor's, almost 160 master's, and a number of PhD programmes.

The language of instruction for most bachelor's courses is Dutch. As of fall 2015, the university offers five bachelor's programmes fully in English: Business Analytics (Faculty of Science); Computer Science (Faculty of Science); International Business Administration (School of Business and Economics); Liberal Arts and Sciences (Amsterdam University College), Literature and Society (Faculty of Humanities); and Philosophy, Politics and Economics (Faculty of Humanities). Fall 2018 the English-taught Bachelor programme History and International Studies (Faculty of Humanities) was launched. Additionally, the university-wide VU Honours Programme is taught in English.

Over 130 master's programmes at VU are offered entirely in English. In some master's programmes, international students outnumber the Dutch students by a large margin. The university also maintains a number of bilateral exchange agreements with foreign universities, allowing foreign students to spend one or two semesters at the Vrije Universiteit.

As with all publicly funded universities in the Netherlands, bachelor's and master's students pay tuition fees determined by law. For the academic year 2015/2016, regular tuition fees for bachelor's and master's programmes amount to €1,951 per year for students from the European Union or European Economic Area and €9,000 to €12,000 per year for students from non-EU/EEA countries. Most Dutch students and long-term Dutch resident EU citizens are eligible for government loans or grants to cover tuition and living expenses.

PhD programmes are organized differently. Rather than applying to the university for admission, prospective students must find a (full) professor who has a position for a PhD candidate, called a 'promovendus', and contact him or her directly. Most faculties advertise open positions on their websites. As is common in Dutch universities, 'promovendi' are paid a salary and are considered university employees, therefore they do not pay tuition.

=== University rankings ===
University rankings

Global – Overall
- ARWU World: 151–200 (2024)
- CWUR World: 149 (2022–23)
- CWTS World: 68 (2022)
- QS World: =194 (2026)
- THE World: =136 (2025)
- USNWR Global: 78 (2025)

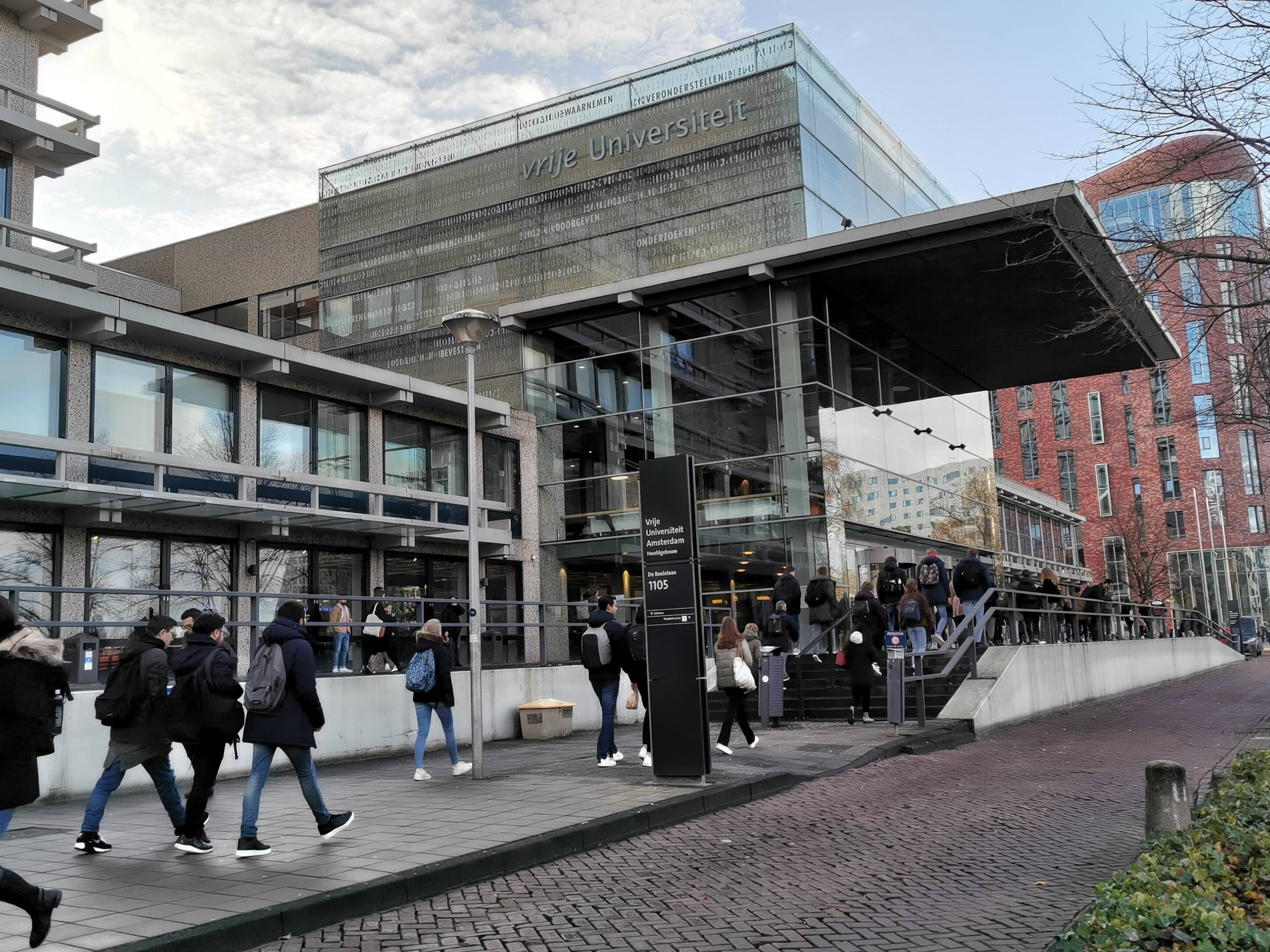
VU Main Building Entrance

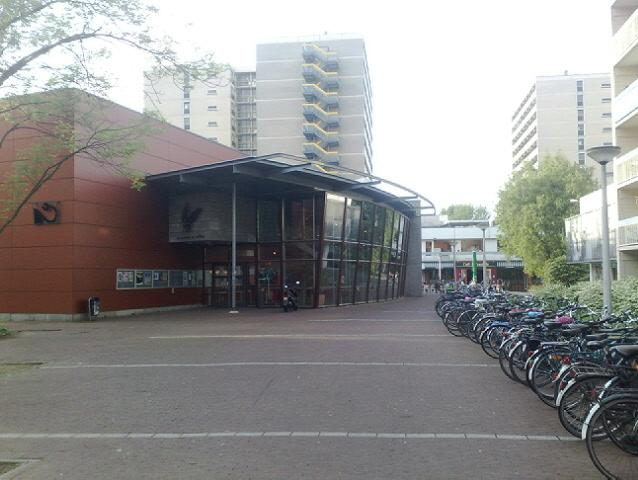
VU Cultural Centre 'Griffioen', located at Uilenstede campus

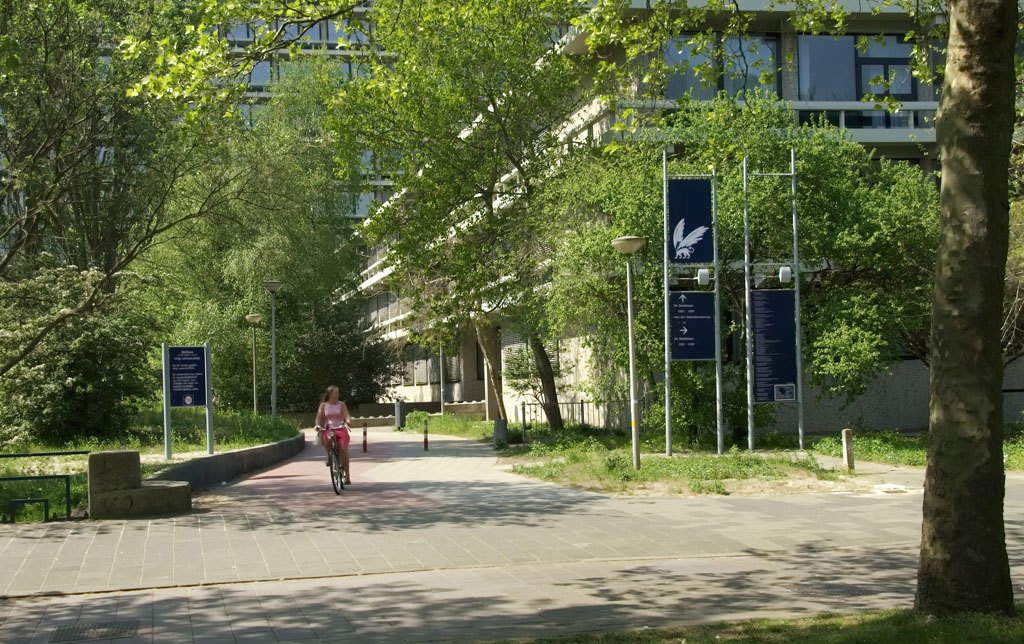
Former eastern entrance to the campus, since 2010 the location of a new building for the Faculty of Law

The Main Building, viewed from campus square

The Sciences Building

In the CWUR - World University Rankings 2019–2020, the Vrije Universiteit is placed 146th overall in the world.

In the 2023 Times Higher Education World University Rankings, VU was ranked 121st. In the subject area of Arts and Humanities, the VU ranks 87th in the world, while in the field of Social Sciences it ranks 81st. In the same fashion, the VU makes it in the top 100 universities worldwide in the following subject areas: Business and Economics (91st), Computer Science (96th), Law (91st), and Psychology (49th).

In the 2023 QS World University Rankings, which attaches 50% to review surveys by academics and employers, the Vrije Universiteit was placed 214 overall in the world. Moreover, the VU has been ranked in the top 50 universities in the field of Sport-Related subjects (23rd), Theology (32nd), Philosophy (34th), and Psychology (43rd). On the other hand, it ranked in the top 100 universities worldwide in Pharmacy and Pharmacology (80th), Medicine (81st), Economics and Business (86th), Communication Sciences (51-100), Geography (51-100), Anatomy (51-100), and other.

On the other hand, the USNWR ranking of global universities ranks the VU 84th in the world, with strong performances in fields such as Economics and Business (44th), Clinical Medicine (58th), Social Sciences and Health (35th) and Arts & Humanities (102nd).

Furthermore, the CWTS, focusing on citation output, ranks the VU 79th in the world.

The 2021 Shanghai Ranking placed the Vrije Universiteit overall in the 101–150 range, with higher rankings in the subject areas Communication (12th), Psychology (22nd), Geography (26th), Law (29th), Nursing and Dentistry (respectively, 36th and 38th), Public Administration (42nd) and Economics (45th). Additionally, other fields make it to the top 100 worldwide according to the Shanghai Ranking, i.e., Political Science (76-100), Medicine (76-100), Sociology (76-100), Business Administration (76-100).

The Tilburg University Top 100 Worldwide Economics Schools Research Ranking based on research contribution 2016-2020 placed the Vrije Universiteit (39th) in the world.

== Research ==
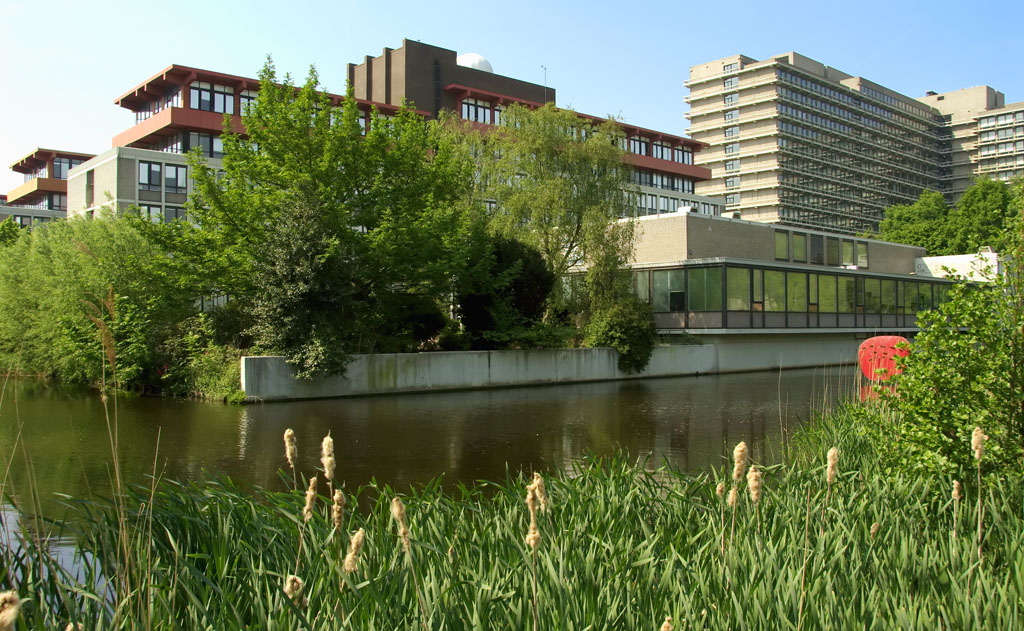
Left: Sciences Building; Right: Main Building.

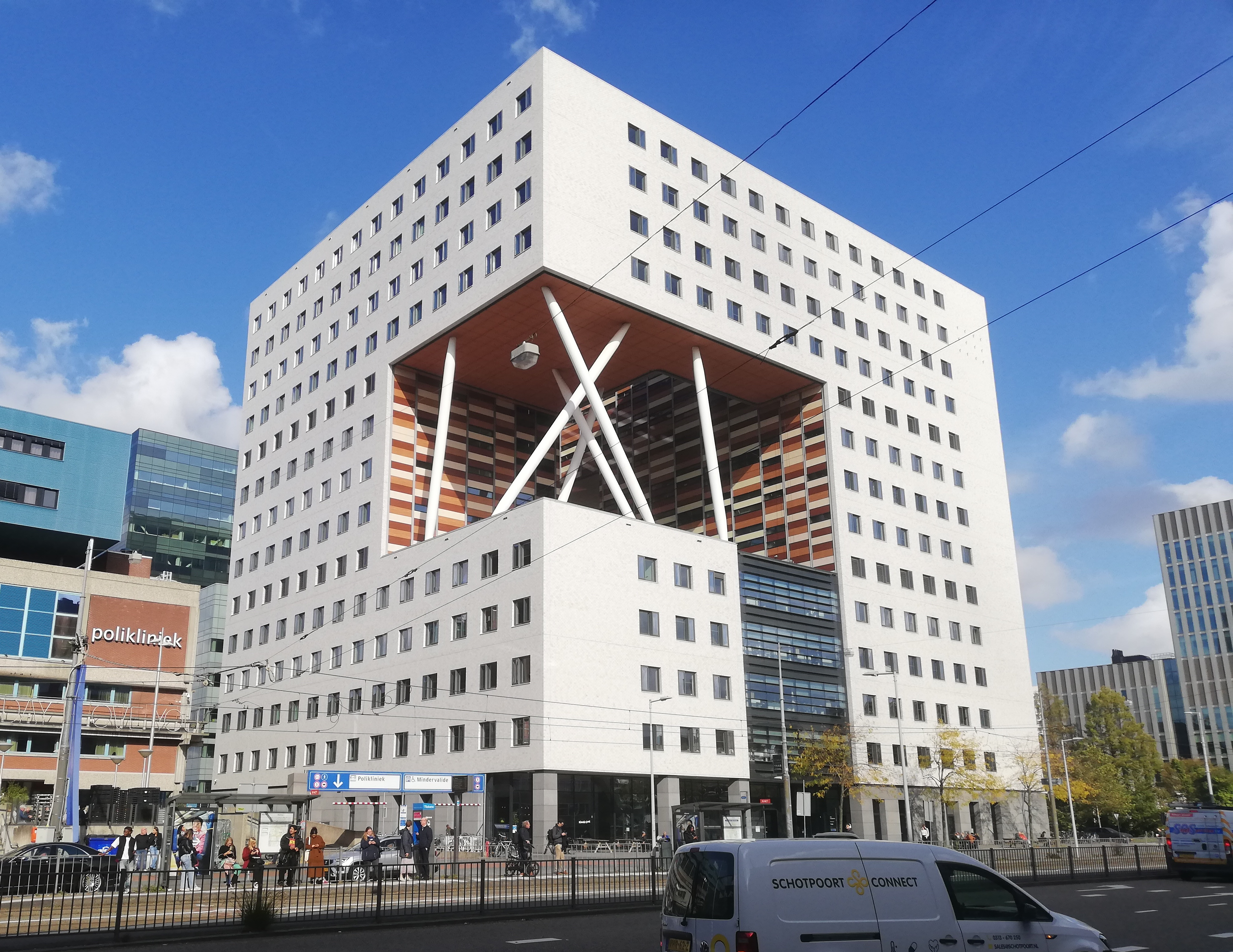
O|2 Lab Building

Like teaching, research at VU is organized mostly along the lines of the ten faculties and their departments. University-wide, four interdisciplinary themes have been determined as the principal focus areas of research:

- Human Health and Life Sciences;
- Science for Sustainability, linking research on national resources with studies on the effects of human intervention, such as climate change;
- Connected World, focusing on the impact of information technology on society; and
- Professional Services, focusing on the business and finance sector and issues such as corporate social responsibility.

In addition to faculty research centres and programmes, the university houses several interdisciplinary research institutes. The Amsterdam Institute of Molecules, Medicines and Systems, founded in 2010, consists of 17 research groups in pharmaceutical sciences, life sciences, computational life sciences and molecular sciences at VU. AIMMS focusses on three programs: molecular mechanisms of biological processes, design and characterization of molecules and medicines, and Biomarkers and diagnostics. Vrije Universiteit Amsterdam School of Business and Economics is also part of the Tinbergen Institute (together with Erasmus University and University of Amsterdam) for economics and finance subject research and training.

Of the nearly 3,000 academic staff (2,257 in fte) employed at VU in 2012, 42% were female. Almost 80% were of Dutch origin, while about 15% had other European nationalities. The remaining 5% came from Asia, North America, Africa, South America and Oceania. Within the body of academic staff, 29% were PhD candidates employed as junior researchers. In 2012, about 300 PhD dissertations were defended at VU.

In 2012, the European Research Council awarded two starting grants and six advanced grants to VU researchers. In addition, 11 VENI and two VICI grants were awarded within the prestigious Innovational Research Incentives Scheme by the Netherlands Organisation for Scientific Research.

In 2013, Professor Piek Vossen (Computational Lexicology) was one of three scholars awarded with the Spinoza Prize, the highest scientific award in the Netherlands.

The University Library holds a relatively large collection of more than 1,000,000 printed items. The library occupies five floors in the university's Main Building, not including closed stacks, while the medical collection is housed at the VU University Medical Center. The library's special collections department holds 70,000 manuscripts and printed items in 26 collections. Important collections include reformation works, original English prints, pamphlets and portraits.

== University newspaper ==
The university's independent newspaper, Ad Valvas, has been in print since 1952. The newspaper formally acquired editorial independence in 1979. Ad Valvas appeared on a weekly basis until fall 2012, when it became as a biweekly magazine. The Ad Valvas magazine focuses primarily on background stories, interviews and op-ed articles, while daily campus news is mostly provided through the newspaper's website.

Ad Valvas is published every Thursday during the academic year, 36 times a year. In 1979, the paper acquired editorial independence and no longer had to answer to the University's Board of Directors. From 1994 to 1999 Frank van Kolfschooten served as the editor-in-chief of the paper.

Ad Valvas had a circulation of 12,226 copies in the period of 2008-2009.

== Notable faculty ==
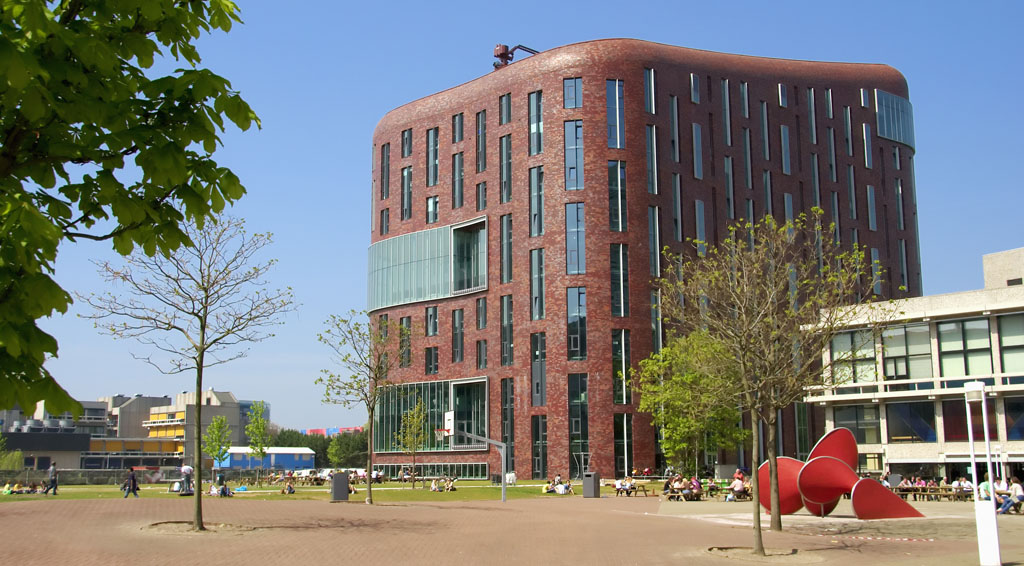
De Rode Pieper ('red potato'), housing the Institute for Health and Wellness

- Fons Trompenaars, organizational theorist, management consultant and author in the field of cross-cultural communication, known for the development of Trompenaars' model of national culture differences, and ranked no. 33 in Thinkers50 global ranking of management thinkers.
- Henri Bal, professor of Computer Science and author of several books, who together with his student John Romein wrote a program that broke the ancient game of Oware (Awari) and gives the best move in any situation, usually leading to a forced win.
- Dorret Boomsma, professor of biological psychology and winner of the Spinozapremie.
- Mark van Vugt, professor of evolutionary psychology and holds affiliate positions at the University of Oxford, Institute for Cognitive and Evolutionary Anthropology (ICEA), and the University of Kent Centre for the Study of Group Processes.
- Brad Bushman, since 2005 a visiting professor from Ohio State University in United States who is a foremost expert on the causes and consequences of human aggression.
- Jaap Doek, professor of law and chairman of the U.N. Committee of the Rights of the Child (2001–2007)
- Carolyn Fischer, professor of economics, climate policy and carbon pricing specialist
- Frank van Harmelen, professor of Artificial Intelligence who co-designed Web Ontology Language (OWL) and authored many books on semantic web.
- Peter Koslowski the ethicist and philosopher, author of nearly 20 books.
- Peter Nijkamp, professor of spatial economics, former president of the governing board of the Netherlands Research Council (NWO), winner of the Spinozapremie
- Piet Rietveld, professor of economics, and leading researcher in transport economics.
- Andrew S. Tanenbaum, professor of Computer Science who wrote the MINIX operating system, the inspiration and precursor to Linux. Tanenbaum is the author of five textbooks, which have been translated into over 20 languages and are used at universities all over the world. He is also the founder and webmaster of electoral-vote.com.
- Richard Tol, professor of economics, and leading researcher in the economics of climate change.
- Pier Vellinga, director of the Climate Centre.

== Notable past faculty ==
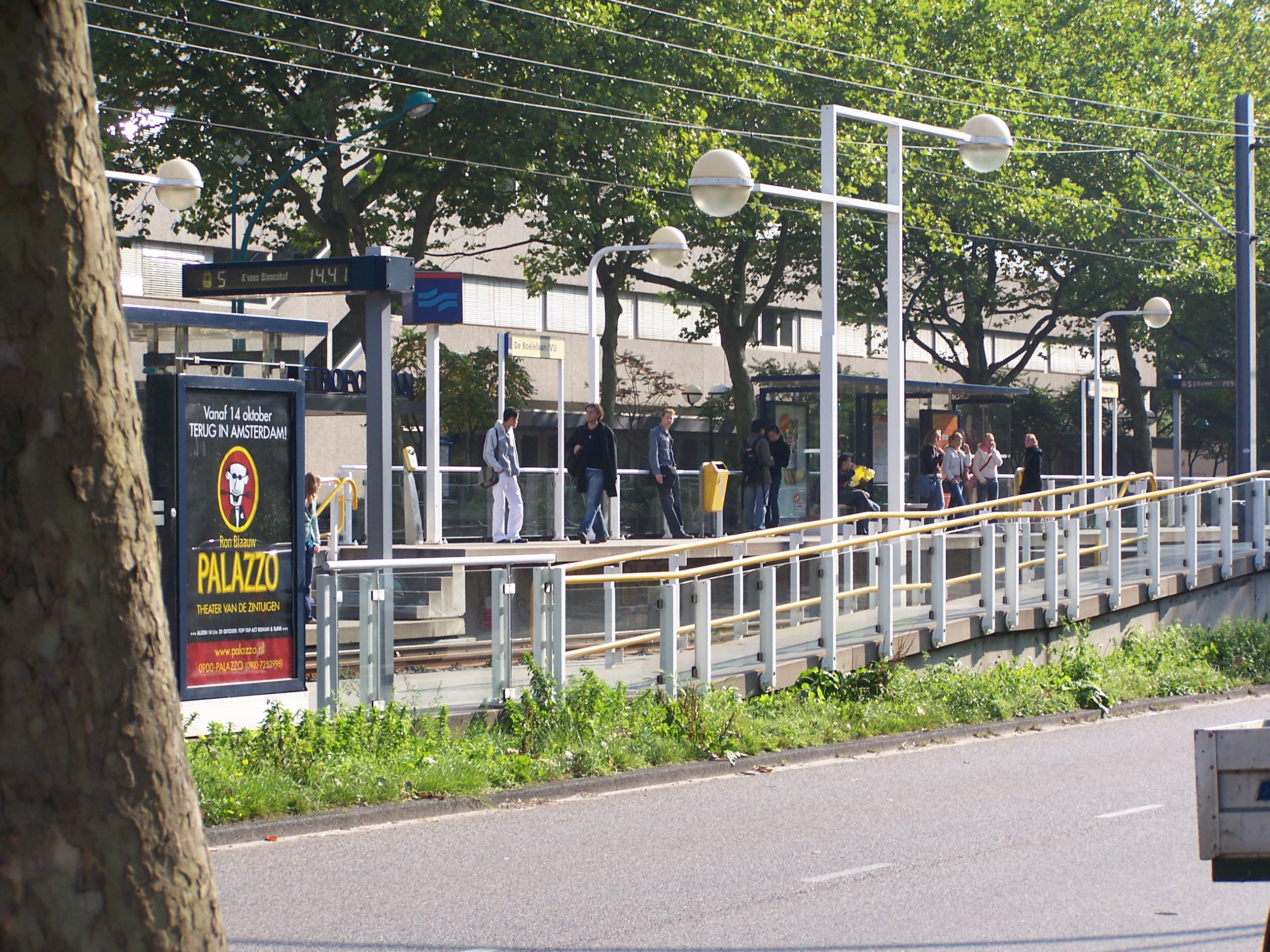
De Boelelaan/VU metro and tram station

- G.Ch. Aalders, theologian
- Jan Peter Balkenende – Extraordinary Professor of Christian Social Thinking (since 2010) – Prime Minister of the Netherlands (2002–2010)
- Herman Bavinck, theologian
- Gerrit Cornelis Berkouwer, theologian
- Jet Bussemaker – Associate Professor of Political Science (1991–2001) – Minister of Education, Culture and Science (2012–2017)
- Arie van Deursen, historian
- Herman Dooyeweerd, philosopher of law
- Caroline van Eck, art historian
- Pieter Sjoerds Gerbrandy – Professor of law and Prime Minister of the Dutch government-in-exile (1940–45)
- Reijer Hooykaas, historian of science
- James Kennedy, professor of modern history (2003–2007)
- Martin L. Kersten, professor of computer science, architect of one of the first column-oriented databases MonetDB
- Jacob Klapwijk, philosopher
- Pieter Kooijmans, professor of international and European law (1965–1973) and Judge on the International Court of Justice
- Abraham Kuyper, professor of theology and Prime Minister of the Netherlands (1901–05)
- Jan Lever, biologist (1922–2010)
- Henk Overbeek, international relations scholar and politician
- Ronald Plasterk, professor of molecular biology (1993–1997), Spinoza Prize laureate, member of the House of Representatives, Minister of Education, and minister of the Interior
- Gerardus J. Sizoo, professor of physics
- Anthony Tol, documentalist
- D. H. Th. Vollenhoven, theologian
- Jan Woltjer, linguist
- Ruud van Nistelrooy, Sports Management
- Jelle Zijlstra – Professor of Economics (1948–1952) – Prime Minister of the Netherlands (1966–1967)

== Notable alumni ==
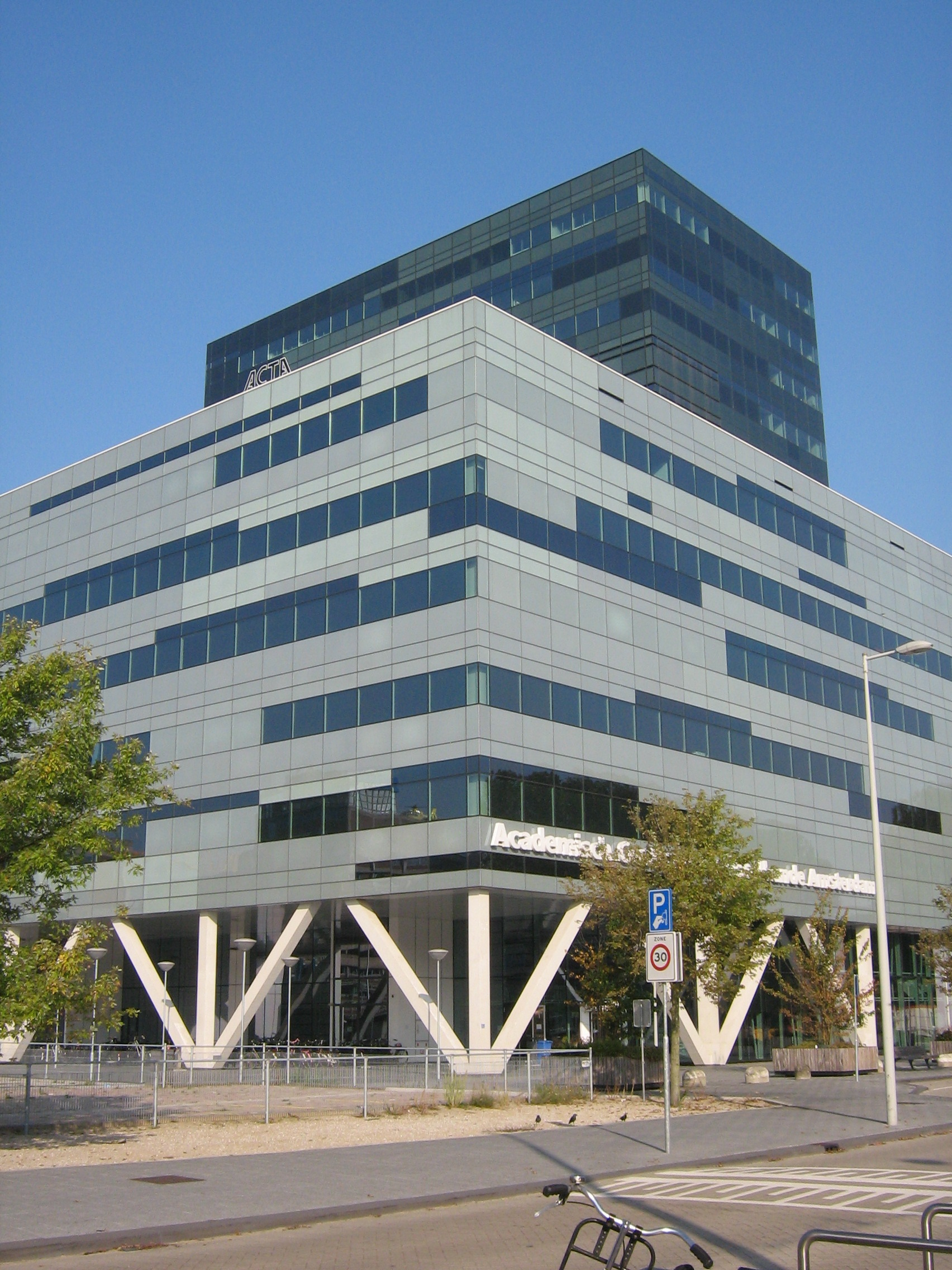
ACTA Building (2010) at Gustav Mahlerlaan, housing the joint VU/UvA school of dentistry

- Christine Aaftink, multiple National Champion Sprint (skating) and winner of medals at the WC; studied at the faculty of Human Movement Sciences
- Rena Bakhshi, programme manager for the Netherlands eScience Center's natural sciences and engineering domain
- Jan Peter Balkenende, former Prime Minister of the Netherlands, studied history and law at the VU
- Jacobus Boomsma, evolutionary biologist who studies social evolution and the evolution of mating systems.
- Gerrit Cornelis Berkouwer, influential theologian and professor at the Vrije Universiteit
- Wouter Bos, former party leader of the Dutch Labour Party and former Minister of Finance of the Netherlands, studied political science and economics at VU
- Elco Brinkman, previous leader of the CDA party, studied political science and law at the VU
- Wim Deetman, Mayor of The Hague, studied political science at the VU
- Ellen van Dijk, multiple cycling World Champion; studied at the faculty of Human Movement Sciences
- Piet Hein Donner, Minister of Justice in several cabinets (Balkenende I, II, III) and Minister of Social Affairs (Balkenende IV), studied law at the VU
- Herman Dooyeweerd, founder of Reformational Philosophy, got his PhD at the VU and became a full professor there
- Bas de Gaay Fortman, the world's only Chair in Political Economy of Human Rights
- Andries de Grip, economist, researcher and author
- Pim Fortuyn, the assassinated party leader of the LPF studied sociology at the VU
- Benny Giay, Chairman of Papua Christian Church (Sinode KINGMI di Tanah Papua), Director of Post-Graduate Program at STT Walter Post (Walter Post Theological College), and peace and human rights activist in Papua
- Frits Goldschmeding, founder of Randstad NV, the second largest staffing company worldwide.
- Hans van Goor, long-distance swimmer
- Laetitia Griffith, former alderman in the Amsterdam city council, now member of the Dutch parliament, studied law at the VU
- Nico Habermann, well-known computer scientist and professor at Carnegie Mellon University
- Hendrik Hart, philosopher and Senior Member Emeritus at the Institute for Christian Studies, Toronto
- Dolf Jansen and Hans Sibbel, together form the comedy team "Lebbis en Jansen," both studied at the VU
- Frans Kaashoek, computer scientist, entrepreneur, and Charles Piper Professor at the Massachusetts Institute of Technology, received his PhD degree in Computer Science in 1992 from VU under supervision of Andy Tanenbaum.
- Bert Koenders, Minister of Developmental Cooperation in the cabinet Balkenende IV, studied social science at the VU
- Pauline Krikke, former alderman in the Amsterdam city council, now mayor of Arnhem
- Ronald A. Kuipers, philosopher and President of the Institute for Christian Studies as of 2018
- Karin Lasthuizen, Dutch-New Zealand academic
- Jona Lendering, Historian and author of seven books, mostly about antiquity
- Linda de Mol, Dutch and German celebrity, who gained her celebrity status from hosting TV shows and acting in movies
- Atzo Nicolaï, Minister of Government Reform and Kingdom Relations in the cabinet Balkenende III, studied law and political science at the VU
- J.W. Niemantsverdriet, Dutch experimental physical chemist, surface scientist, author, and academic.
- James Olthuis, philosopher, theologian, psychotherapist, and Senior Member Emeritus at the Institute for Christian Studies, Toronto.
- Ferdinand Postma first rector of the Potchefstroom University for Christian Higher Education in Potchefstroom, South Africa in 1919
- Cristina Pumplun, missionary vicar of the Westerkerk, Amsterdam
- Calvin Seerveld, philosopher and Senior Member Emeritus in Philosophical Aesthetics at the Institute for Christian Studies, Toronto.
- Lewis B. Smedes, American Reformed ethicist and author; also visiting professor at VU
- Nico Rienks, double Olympic Champion rowing (1988, 1996); studied at the faculty of Human Movement Sciences
- André Rouvoet, Minister of Youth and Family Affairs and Vice-Prime Minister in the cabinet Balkenende IV, studied law at the VU
- Robert Charles Sproul, a popular American Reformed theologian and classical Thomistic apologist
- Paul-Peter Tak, immunologist, academic and Chief Immunology Officer of GSK.
- Jacob Daniel du Toit, South African Poet and bible translator.
- Eberhard van der Laan, former mayor of the City of Amsterdam
- Peter van der Voort, physician, professor, and politician, studied medicine at the VU
- Johannes Cornelis van Rooy, Rector of the Potchefstroom University for Christian Higher Education, in Potchefstroom South Africa
- Karel Marinus Van Vliet, physicist
- Geert M.N. Verschuuren, Philosophy of Science, in particular Philosophy of Biology
- Hans Vijlbrief, civil servant, economist, and State Secretary for Finance in the cabinet Rutte III, studied economics at the VU
- Werner Vogels, Chief Technology Officer and Vice President of Amazon.com, got his PhD in Computer Science at the VU
- Conrad Johannes Wethmar, Professor of Theology in University of Pretoria
- Dilan Yeşilgöz-Zegerius, Minister of Justice and Security in the Fourth Rutte cabinet
- Gerrit Zalm, Minister of Finance in the cabinets Kok I, Kok II, Balkenende II and Balkenende III, and current CEO of ABN AMRO, studied and taught economics at VU.

== Associations and Alliances ==
Together with the University of Twente (UT), VU Amsterdam forms the Alliance VU-UT, a strategic collaboration in education, research and innovation. The alliance brings together engineering sciences with the humanities, natural sciences and social sciences, and offers joint degree programmes, including Creative Technology and Mechanical Engineering, in which students study in both Amsterdam and Twente and earn a technical university degree. The collaboration also focuses on multidisciplinary research and on strengthening the knowledge and innovation ecosystems of East Netherlands and the Randstad.

== See also ==
- Hortus Botanicus Vrije Universiteit Amsterdam
- List of modern universities in Europe (1801–1945)
- List of rectores magnifici of the Vrije Universiteit Amsterdam
- VU University Medical Center (VUmc)
