= J.W. Niemantsverdriet =

Dutch physical chemist

J.W. "Hans" Niemantsverdriet
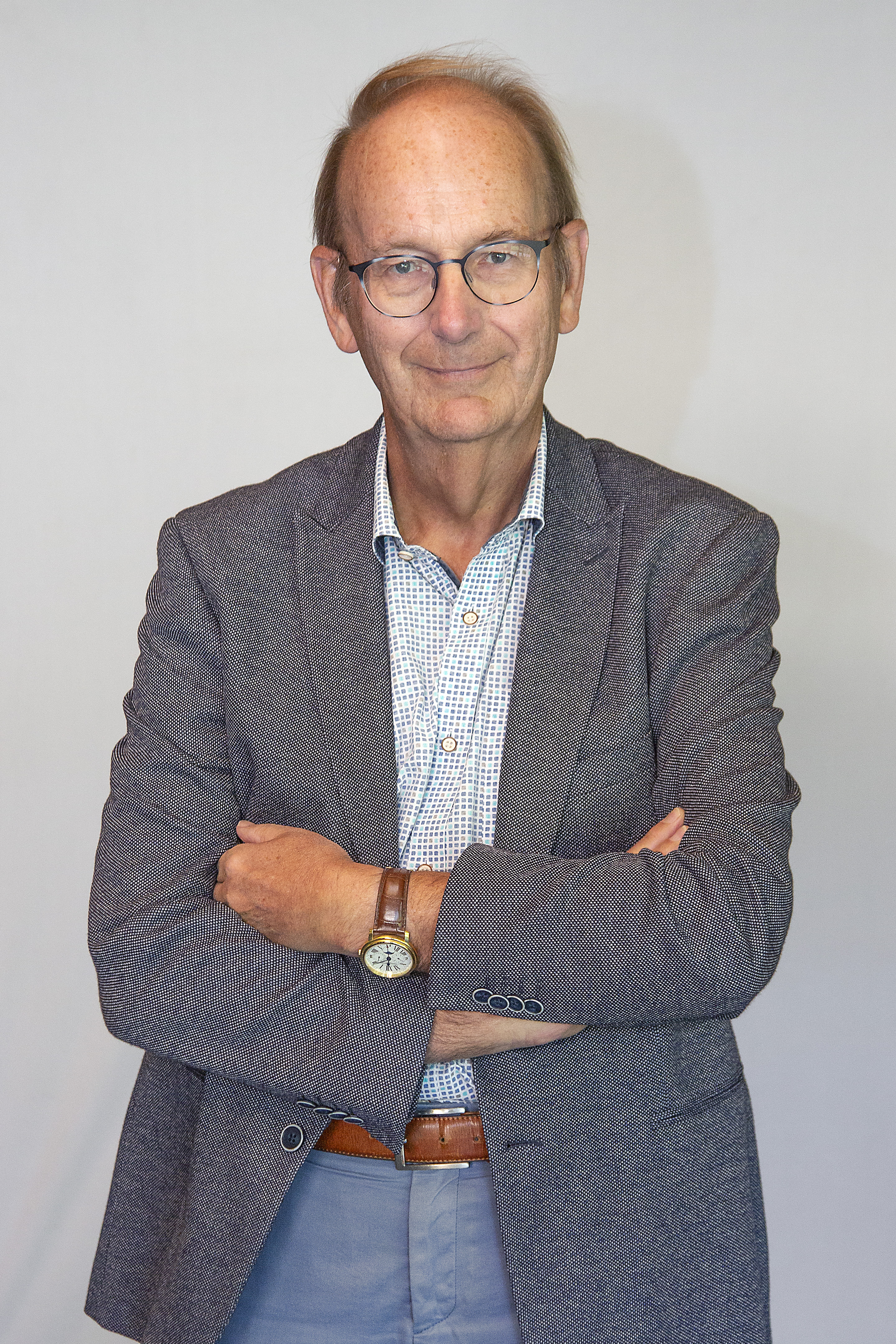
- Occupations: Physical chemist, surface scientist, academic, author, editor, and research director

Academic background
- Education: Free University Amsterdam; Delft University of Technology
- Thesis: A Mossbauer Investigation of Iron and Iron Alloy Fischer-Tropsch Catalysts (1983)
- Academic advisors: A.M. van de Kraan; J.J. van Loef; V. Ponec

J.W. "Hans" Niemantsverdriet is a Dutch experimental physical chemist, surface scientist, author, and academic. He is a Professor Emeritus of Physical Chemistry of Surfaces at the Eindhoven University of Technology in the Netherlands and an Honorary Distinguished Professor at the Cardiff Catalysis Institute of Cardiff University.

Niemantsverdriet's research spans the field of surface science and catalysis. He has authored two textbooks, Spectroscopy in Catalysis, and Concepts of Modern Catalysis and Kinetics and has published more than 300 peer-reviewed articles. Niemantsverdriet served as editor of the Journal of Catalysis and is the founder of the research enterprises Syngaschem BV, Catsurfchem BV, and SynCat Academy.

== Education ==
Hans Niemantsverdriet earned his baccalaureate degree in physics and mathematics in 1973 and a master's degree in experimental physics in 1978 from the Free University Amsterdam. He then completed his PhD in technical sciences in 1983 from the Interuniversity Reactor Institute at Delft University under the supervision of A.M. van de Kraan, J.J. van Loef, and V. Ponec (Leiden University) followed by a postdoc from the same institute from 1983 to 1984. His thesis was titled, "A Mossbauer Investigation of Iron and Iron Alloy Fischer-Tropsch Catalysts".

In 1984, Niemantsverdriet was awarded the ZWO Huygens fellowship, enabling him to conduct research for five years. During this time, he worked at Eindhoven University of Technology (TU/e) in the Laboratory of Roel Prins within the Department of Chemical Engineering and Chemistry. Additionally, from September 1985 to August 1987, he worked and studied with Klaus Wandelt and Gerhard Ertl at LMU Munich and the Fritz-Haber-Institute, Berlin.

== Career ==
Niemantsverdriet began his academic career as an associate professor at the Eindhoven University of Technology (TU/e) in 1989 and was appointed as a professor in 1999. He retired from TU/e in 2015. In October 2014, Aalto University, formerly known as Helsinki University of Technology, appointed him as Doctor Honoris Causa and he served as an Honorary Professor at the University of Cape Town from 2018 to 2022. In 2016, Jiangsu University appointed him Adjunct Professor for life. Since 2013, he has been serving as an Honorary Professor at Cardiff Catalysis Institute of Cardiff University.

Niemantsverdriet was the Dean of the Department of Chemical Engineering and Chemistry, and later of the Graduate School at the Eindhoven University of Technology, Chair of the Scientific Advisory Board of the School of Chemical Technology at Aalto University, Chair of the Scientific Advisory Board of the Institute of Chemical Engineering Sciences in Singapore, President of the European Federation of Catalysis Societies, and International Advisor and board member of the South African National Centre of Excellence at the University of Cape Town.

Since 2013, Niemantsverdriet has spent a substantial part of his time in Beijing – Huairou, as co-founder (together with Yong-Wang Li) and Director of SynCat, the new laboratory for fundamental research in catalysis and materials science of Synfuels China Technology. Associated with SynCat at Beijing and Syngaschem BV is the branch SynCat@DIFFER in Eindhoven (2016–2023), housed at the Dutch Institute for Fundamental Energy Research at Eindhoven.

Niemantsverdriet has developed and presented courses on how to prepare and give effective presentations at scientific meetings, make efficient posters, and write scientific articles. In collaboration with Ir. Jan Karel Felderhof, he founded Academy, an organization for courses in catalysis, surface science, and scientific leadership development. Together they wrote a book on the subject, entitled Scientific Leadership.

== Research ==
Niemantsverdriet's research has been focused on investigating fundamental principles and mechanisms governing surface reactions and catalytic processes. His work encompasses aspects including surface chemistry, catalytic materials, reaction kinetics, and the development of efficient catalysts. He elucidated the mechanisms and kinetics of elementary reaction steps on surfaces, creating surface science models for sulfide catalysts, and exploring catalysis in syngas conversion. Fischer-Tropsch synthesis has been a notable research theme throughout his research career.

=== Surface science and catalysis ===
Niemantsverdriet's research primarily revolves around exploring the surface chemistry, which involves studying the reactions and transformations that occur when molecules interact with a solid surface and their importance in understanding atomic-level information on the structure, composition, and reactivity of supported catalysts. He disposed over modern surface science spectroscopies, and made use of synchrotrons and used Molecular Modeling (Density functional theory) for the interpretation of results. He specialised in modeling systems with nano particles or layered phases on planar supports and broadening the scope to organometallics, electrocatalysis and photocatalysis.

=== Collaborative research efforts ===
Niemantsverdriet's collaborative research has encompassed a range of fields, involving Fischer-Tropsch synthesis with Jan van de Loosdrecht and Philip Gibson; Hans Fredriksson, and Kees-Jan Weststrate, coordination chemistry with Jannie Swarts, and theoretical modeling in collaboration with Dani Curulla-Ferre, Jose Gracia, and Olusz Ozbek. Working together with Peter Thüne, they explored polymerization catalysis, using that polymerization and crystallization of polyolefins on flat model catalysts serves as an effective method for investigating polymer physics and crystal formation. Through collaborative research with Rob van Veen, Thomas Weber, Gurram Kishan, and Armando Borgna, they investigated several methods of preparing hydrodesulfurization catalysts and the studying reaction kinetics. Later, with Foteini Sapountzi, the interests broadened to include the field of electrocatalysis and they contributed among others a review on the electrochemical splitting of water to the literature.

In conjunction with Ben Nieuwenhuys, Niemantsverdriet contributed to the field of surface science. They studied the adsorption of CO and NO on various gold and rhodium surfaces, including low index and stepped surfaces. His collaboration with Yong-Wang Li and Kees-Jan Weststrate has also yielded numerous publications on fundamental surface science in the context of Fischer-Tropsch Synthesis.

== Publications ==
=== Books ===
- Spectroscopy in Catalysis (1993) ISBN 978-3527302000
- Chemical Kinetics & Catalysis, with R.A. van Santen (1995) ISBN 978-0306450273
- Concepts of Modern Catalysis and Kinetics, with I. Chorkendorff (2003) ISBN 978-3527332687
- Scientific Leadership, with J.K. Felderhof (2017) ISBN 978-3110468885

=== Selected articles ===
- Niemantsverdriet, J. W.; Van der Kraan, A. M.; Van Dijk, W. L.; Van der Baan, H. S. (December 1980). "Behavior of metallic iron catalysts during Fischer-Tropsch synthesis studied with Mössbauer spectroscopy, x-ray diffraction, carbon content determination, and reaction kinetic measurements". The Journal of Physical Chemistry. 84 (25): 3363–3370. Bibcode:1980JPhCh..84.3363N. doi:10.1021/j100462a011.
- De Jong, A. M., & Niemantsverdriet, J. W. (1990). Thermal desorption analysis: Comparative test of ten commonly applied procedures. Surface Science, 233(3), 355–365.
- van der Vlies, A. J.; Kishan, G.; Niemantsverdriet, J. W.; Prins, R.; Weber, Th. (April 2002). "Basic Reaction Steps in the Sulfidation of Crystalline Tungsten Oxides". The Journal of Physical Chemistry B. 106 (13): 3449–3457. Bibcode:2002JPCB..106.3449V. doi:10.1021/jp0138734.
- Gunter, Pieter L. J.; Niemantsverdriet, J. W.; Ribeiro, Fabio H.; Somorjai, Gabor A. (February 1997). "Surface Science Approach to Modeling Supported Catalysts". Catalysis Reviews. 39 (1–2): 77–168. doi:10.1080/01614949708006469.
- Saib, A.M., Moodley, D.J., Ciobîcă, I.M., Hauman, M.M., Sigwebela, B.H., Weststrate, C.J., Niemantsverdriet, J.W. and Van de Loosdrecht, J. (2010). Fundamental understanding of deactivation and regeneration of cobalt Fischer–Tropsch synthesis catalysts. Catalysis Today, 154(3–4), 271–282.
- Sapountzi, F. M., Gracia, J. M., Fredriksson, H. O., Weststrate C.J., & Niemantsverdriet, J. H. (2017). Electrocatalysts for the generation of hydrogen, oxygen and synthesis gas. Progress in Energy and Combustion Science, 58, 1–35.
- Dai, Y., Li, C., Shen, Y., Lim, T., Xu, J., Li, Y., Niemantsverdriet, H., Besenbacher, F., Lock, N. and Su, R. (2017). Light-tuned selective photosynthesis of azo-and azoxy-aromatics using graphitic C3N4. Nature communications, 9(1), 60.
- Weststrate, C. J., Sharma, D., Garcia Rodriguez, D., Gleeson, M. A., Fredriksson, H. O., & Niemantsverdriet, J. W. (2019). Mechanistic insight into carbon-carbon bond formation on cobalt under simulated Fischer-Tropsch synthesis conditions. Nature communications, 11(1), 750.
- Guo, W., Yin, J., Xu, Z., Li, W., Peng, Z., Weststrate, C. J., Yu, X., He, Y., Cao, Z., Wen, X., Yang, Y., Wu. K., Li. Y., Niemantsverdriet, J. W., & Zhou. X. (2022). Visualization of on-surface ethylene polymerization through ethylene insertion. Science, 375(6585), 1188–1191.
