= Jan Lever =

Dutch biologist and university professor

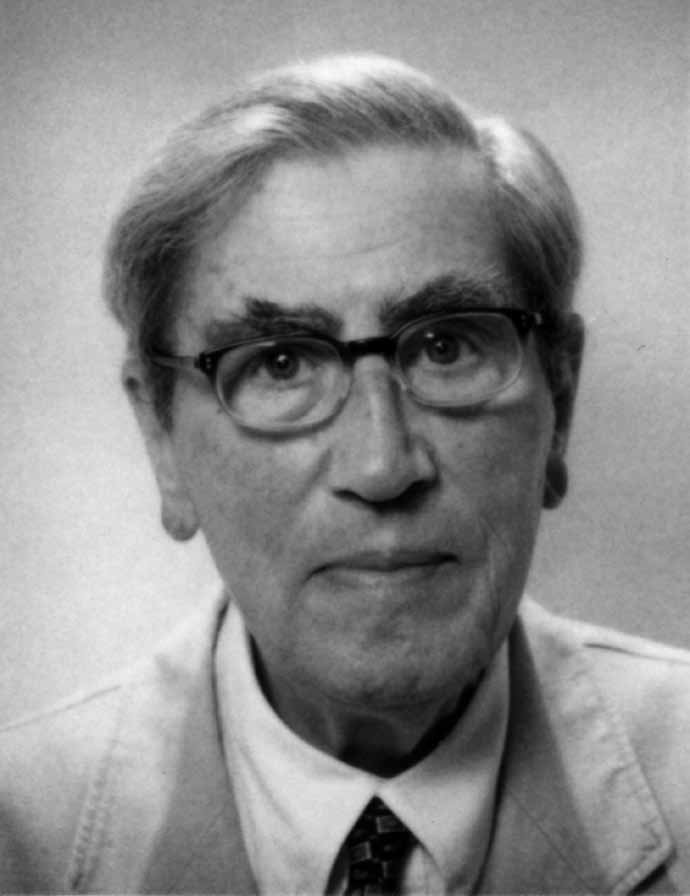

Jan Lever (Groningen, 20 July 1922 – Amsterdam, 23 November 2010) was a Dutch biologist specialized in zoology, endocrinology and evolutionary biology. His ideas on evolution may be characterized as a form of theistic evolution. Lever was an important voice in shaping Dutch public debate on evolution and biology, particularly in protestant circles.

== Life and career ==
The Reformed Lever studied biology at Utrecht University from 1939 onwards. Lever obtained his doctorate in 1950. He served as a professor of zoology at the Vrije Universiteit Amsterdam from 1952 until 1986. In his inaugural lecture, he presented his belief that evolution was the way in which God had created the world. He further developed this argument in his book Creatie en evolutie (1956; English translation 1958 under the title Creation and Evolution).

In 1970, Lever was elected member of the Royal Netherlands Academy of Arts and Sciences.

== Research and writings ==
In the early 1950s, Lever started research on the neuroendocrine system of the basommatophoran snail, Lymnaea stagnalis. Lever himself found a particular kind of neurons in the ancylid snail Ferrissia, and his student Joos Joosse demonstrated those neurons in other snail species. Lymnaea became the animal of choice for physiological research at the VU Amsterdam laboratory for decades.

At the beginning of his career, Lever’s ideas about evolution and the species concept were inspired by the Reformational philosophy of philosopher Herman Dooyeweerd. During his student days, Lever became acquainted with the biologist Johann Heinrich Diemer, who had published about Dooyeweerd's approach in the domain of biology in the 1930s. Diemer was a great influence on Lever's thought. Together with Dooyeweerd, Lever wrote four articles about the species concept in the journal Philosophia Reformata (1948–1950) in which species were defined as constant types. In his book, Creatie en Evolutie (1956), Lever still subscribed to Dooyeweerd’s philosophy but also suggested that it is possible that biological evolution occurred. Later he moved away from these earlier ideas about species constancy, and adhered to a kind of theistic evolution.

== Publications ==
- Creatie en Evolutie (1956); translated in English (1958) as Creation and Evolution
- Quantitative beach research I, The "left-right-phenomenon": Sorting of lamellibranch valves on sandy beaches (1958)
- Waar blijven we? (1969); translated in English (1970) as Where are we headed? A biologist talks about origins, evolution, and the future
- Geïntegreerde biologie (1973)
- Schepping en evolutie (1985)
- Bomengids van Amsterdam-Zuid (2002)
- Feniks en broedmachine. Reisverhalen over deze wondere wereld (2003)
- Langs de mysterieuze grenzen van het leven (2006)
- Een bioloog leest de Bijbel (2010)

== Literature ==
- Ab Flipse (2010), "In memoriam prof. dr. Jan Lever, 20 juli 1922 – 23 november 2010". HDC.VU.NL, 9 December 2010. Accessed 5 November 2018.
- Ab Flipse (2016), "Jan Lever: bioloog, bruggenbouwer en boegbeeld van de VU", in: Verder kijken. Honderdvijfendertig jaar Vrije Universiteit Amsterdam in de samenleving. Amsterdam: Vrije Universiteit, 196-202.
- Willem Bouwman (2006), "De evolutie van professor Lever", Nederlands Dagblad, 17 maart 2006.
- Ab Flipse (red.)(2022), Jan Lever - Honderd. Terugblikken op leven en werk van VU-bioloog Jan Lever (1922-2010) (Amsterdam: HDC, 2022); 158 pp.; ISBN 978-90-72319-41-8; Donum-reeks dl. 21
