= Dick Grune =

Dutch computer scientist

- Born: Enschede, Netherlands
- Known for: CVS; Amsterdam Compiler Kit
- Scientific career
- Fields: Computer science

Dick Grune is a Dutch computer scientist and university lecturer best known for inventing and developing the first version of the Concurrent Versions System (CVS). Grune was involved in the construction of Algol 68 compilers in the 1970s and the Amsterdam Compiler Kit in the 1980s.

He also named gnome sort, a sorting algorithm invented by Hamid Sarbazi-Azad, who originally published it under the name stupid sort.

== Selected publications ==
- Henri E. Bal and Dick Grune. Programming Language Essentials. Addison-Wesley, 1994. ISBN 0-201-63179-2.
- Dick Grune and Ceriel J. H. Jacobs. Parsing Techniques: A Practical Guide (Second Edition). Springer, 2008. ISBN 978-0-387-20248-8.
- Dick Grune, Kees van Reeuwijk, Henri E. Bal, Ceriel J. H. Jacobs, and Koen G. Langendoen. Modern Compiler Design (Second Edition). John Wiley & Sons, 2010.
