= Karin Lasthuizen =

Dutch-New Zealand academic

Karin Marjolein Lasthuizen
- Born: 1970 (age 55–56)
- Education: VU University Amsterdam
- Scientific career
- Workplaces: VU University Amsterdam, Victoria University of Wellington
- Thesis: Leading to integrity : empirical research into the effects of leadership on ethics and integrity (2008)

Karin Marjolein Lasthuizen (born 1970) is a Dutch-New Zealand academic. As of 2016, she holds the Brian Picot Chair in Ethical Leadership at the Victoria University of Wellington.

== Academic career ==
After an undergraduate at Radboud University Nijmegen, Lasthuizen did a 2008 PhD at VU University Amsterdam titled 'Leading to integrity : empirical research into the effects of leadership on ethics and integrity.' She then lectured at VU University Amsterdam and was a city councilor for the Labour Party before moving to Wellington, New Zealand in 2016 to take up the Brian Picot Chair in Ethical Leadership at the Victoria University of Wellington.

Lasthuizen's research focus on public-sector ethics and leadership.

== Selected works ==
- Van der Wal, Zeger, Gjalt De Graaf, and Karin Lasthuizen. "What’s valued most? Similarities and differences between the organizational values of the public and private sector." Public administration 86, no. 2 (2008): 465–482.
- Huberts, Leo WJC, Muel Kaptein, and Karin Lasthuizen. "A study of the impact of three leadership styles on integrity violations committed by police officers." Policing: An International Journal of Police Strategies & Management 30, no. 4 (2007): 587–607.
- Lasthuizen, Karin M. "Leading to integrity: Empirical research into the effects of leadership on ethics and integrity." (2008).
- Akker, L. V., Leonie Heres, Karin Lasthuizen, and F. E. Six. "Ethical leadership and trust: It's all about meeting expectations." (2009).
- Kaptein, Muel, Leo Huberts, Scott Avelino, and Karin Lasthuizen. "Demonstrating ethical leadership by measuring ethics: A survey of US public servants." Public Integrity 7, no. 4 (2005): 299–311.
