= Andries de Grip =

Economist (Maastricht University)

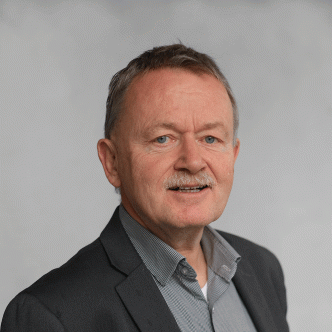
- de Grip in 2015
- Occupations: Economist, professor, and author

Academic background
- Education: Free University, Amsterdam

Academic work
- Discipline: Labour economics
- Institutions: Research Centre for Education and the Labour Market (ROA), Maastricht University

Andries de Grip is a Dutch economist, academic, and author. He is a Professor of Economics at the Research Centre for Education and the Labour Market (ROA), School of Business and Economics (SBE), Maastricht University and has been Director of ROA from 2013 to 2020.

De Grip has published over 100 articles and has been cited over 8,800 times. His research interests center around the field of labour economics with particular attention on human capital development and skills obsolescence, informal learning, the effects of training on firm performance, HRM, labour market forecasts, flexible contracts, new ways of working, innovation, and the effects of the postponement of the retirement age. He is also the co-author of three books, titled The Overeducated Worker? The Economics of Skill Use, Overeducation in Europe: Current Issues in Theory and Policy and The Economics of Skills Obsolescence.

De Grip is a Research Fellow of the Graduate School of Business and Economics at Maastricht University, IZA Institute of Labor Economics and Netspar (University Tilburg). He is also Chair of the editorial board of Netspar and on the advisory board of various organizations, including the Dutch Nationaal Coördinatiepunt Nederlands Kwalificatieraamwerk (NCP NLQF), the Labour Market and Education Committee of Dutch Social Economic Council (SER), and the Federal Institute for Vocational Education and Training (BIBB). He has served as Secretary of the Board of the European Association of Labour Economists (EALE) for 7 years.

== Education ==
De Grip attended the Free University of Amsterdam (Vrije Universiteit Amsterdam) and graduated cum laude with an MSc degree in economics in 1981, and earned a PhD degree in economics in 1987. His Doctoral dissertation is titled "Onderwijs en arbeidsmarkt: Scholingsdiscrepanties (Education and the labour market: Skill mismatches)."

== Career ==
From 1981 till 1983, De Grip was Teacher in Economics and Business Administration at Broklede (high school) in Breukelen, and subsequently rejoined the Faculty of Economics of Free University of Amsterdam as a Ph.D. researcher in 1983. He held his next appointment at Research Centre for Education and the Labour Market (ROA) at Maastricht University as an External consultant from 1986 till 1987, Researcher from 1987 till 1988 and Chief researcher from 1988 till 1999. Since 1999, he is Professor of Economics at the School of Business and Economics (SBE), Maastricht University, and from 2013 to 2020, he was Director of ROA. He also served as Associate Dean for Strategy and Collaboration of SBE, as Chair of the Board of Network Social Innovation (NSI) at Maastricht University and Secretary of the Board of the European Association of Labour Economists (EALE) till 2020.

== Research ==
De Grip's research focuses on various topics in the field of labour economics and related disciplines, such as overeducation and skills mismatches, acquisition of skills and skill obsolescence, human capital development, human resource management, employability, training and retirement, informal learning, industrial labour market and HR studies, skill biased technological and organisational change, labour force participation and unemployment.

=== Employability ===
De Grip has published various studies on employability focusing on the industry employability index, the concept of employability, the drivers of employability at the individual and company level and its relevance for HRM policies. While examining the significance of atypical employability in the various member states of the European Union (EU), he explored two major forms of atypical employment, such as part-time and temporary employment, and also determined the extent to which supply-side personal characteristics and demand-side occupational characteristics affect atypical employment relations. The comparison of the incidence of atypical employment in 11 European countries shows that high rates of part-time employment mitigate unemployment, but high proportions of temporary employment seem to coincide with high unemployment.

De Grip has also shown that the employability of workers is becoming even more important because in many countries the eligibility for a retirement pension is shifting to a higher age, which leads to lower work engagement and even depression.

=== Skills obsolescence ===
De Grip published a review study on the economic literature on the various causes of skills obsolescence and the ways in which skills obsolescence has been modelled or estimated. He also described the risk factors and remedies regarding skills obsolescence, and argued that there is considerable variation in the effectiveness of the remedies across different types of skills obsolescence. In this study, he discussed a widely observed pessimistic view according to which the value of diploma's decreases over time. He compared this insight to the view that knowledge becomes the crucial production factor, which is required in more and more occupations. While focusing on skill obsolescence, lifelong learning and labor market participation, he examined whether technological change induces skill obsolescence and early labor market exit, and to what extent lifelong learning reduces these risks. In another study, he discussed human capital depreciation rates during career interruptions due to family reasons, and found out that short-run depreciation rates in high-skilled occupations are significantly lower in female than in male occupations. It was evident from the study that high-skilled women deliberately choose female occupations because of the lower short-term wage penalties for family-related career interruptions.

=== Human capital development ===
De Grip published various studies on human capital development in the field of lifelong learning, he compared the participation rates of flexworkers and the workers with permanent contracts in firm-specific training that is meant to keep up with new skill demands. Results of his study indicate that for workers with a temporary contract, participation in employer-funded firm-specific training facilitates the transition to a permanent contract with the same employer. Using the Dutch Life-Long-Learning Survey 2007, he demonstrated that full-time workers take benefits from firms' human resource practices, while part-time workers can only partly compensate the lack of firm support when they are highly motivated their future development. In a field-experiment, De Grip has shown that participation in a training programme leads to a 10% increase in worker performance. In his research, De Grip has also highlighted the importance of informal learning (learning by doing and learning from peers as a major mode of human capital development.

== Awards/honors ==
- Excellent Fellow Award, SBE, Maastricht University
- Business Development and Knowledge Transfer Award
- Best Careers Applied Paper Award, Academy of Management

https://www.maastrichtuniversity.nl/sites/default/files/ppp/70000905/fullcv_degrip.pdf

== Bibliography ==
=== Books ===
- The Overeducated Worker? The Economics of Skill Use (2000) ISBN 9781840641554 https://www.amazon.com/Overeducated-Worker-Economics-Utilization-Monographs/dp/184064155X
- The Economics of Skills Obsolescence, Research in Labor Economics (2002) ISBN 9780762309603 DOI: 10.1016/S0147-9121(2002)21
- Overeducation in Europe: Current Issues in Theory and Policy (2003) ISBN 9781781957523

https://www.e-elgar.com/shop/gbp/overeducation-in-europe-9781843763611.html

=== Selected articles ===
- De Grip, A., Hoevenberg, J., & Willems, E. (1997). Atypical employment in the European Union. Int'l Lab. Rev., 136, 49. https://heinonline.org/HOL/LandingPage?handle=hein.journals/intlr136&div=11&id=&page=
- De Grip, A., Van Loo, J., & Sanders, J. (2004). The industry employability index: Taking account of supply and demand characteristics. Int'l Lab. Rev., 143, 211. https://doi.org/10.1111/j.1564-913X.2004.tb00269.x
- De Grip, A., & Sauermann, J. (2012). The effects of training on own and co-worker productivity: Evidence from a field experiment. The Economic Journal, 122(560), 376–399. https://doi.org/10.1111/j.1468-0297.2012.02500.x
- Grip, A. D., Lindeboom, M., & Montizaan, R. (2012). Shattered dreams: the effects of changing the pension system late in the game. The Economic Journal, 122(559), 1–25. https://doi.org/10.1111/j.1468-0297.2011.02486.x
- De Grip, A., Sauermann, J., & Sieben, I. (2016). The role of peers in estimating tenure-performance profiles: Evidence from personnel data. Journal of Economic Behavior & Organization, 126, 39–54. DOI:10.1016/j.jebo.2016.03.002
- Montizaan, R., De Grip, A., Cörvers, F., & Dohmen, T. (2016). The impact of negatively reciprocal inclinations on worker behavior: Evidence from a retrenchment of pension rights. Management Science, 62(3), 668–681. https://doi.org/10.1287/mnsc.2015.2157
- De Bruin, A. B., Kok, E. M., Lobbestael, J., & De Grip, A. (2017). The impact of an online tool for monitoring and regulating learning at university: overconfidence, learning strategy, and personality. Metacognition and Learning, 12(1), 21–43. https://doi.org/10.1007/s11409-016-9159-5
- Van Landeghem, B., Cörvers, F., & De Grip, A. (2017). Is there a rationale to contact the unemployed right from the start? Evidence from a natural field experiment. Labour Economics, 45, 158–168. https://doi.org/10.1016/j.labeco.2016.11.009
- Ferreira, M., De Grip, A., & Van der Velden, R. (2018). Does informal learning at work differ between temporary and permanent workers? Evidence from 20 OECD countries. Labour Economics, 55, 18–40. https://doi.org/10.1016/j.labeco.2018.08.009
- Fleuren, B. P., van Amelsvoort, L. G., Zijlstra, F. R., De Grip, A., & Kant, I. (2018). Handling the reflective-formative measurement conundrum: a practical illustration based on sustainable employability. Journal of clinical epidemiology, 103, 71–81. https://doi.org/10.1016/j.jclinepi.2018.07.007
- Gerards, R., De Grip, A. & Baudewijns, C. (2018). Do new ways of working increase work engagement, Personnel Review, 47, 2018, 517-534. https://doi.org/10.1108/PR-02-2017-0050
- van Wetten, S. J., Gerards, R., & De Grip, A. (2020). Are graduates’ intrapreneurial skills optimally used for innovation?. Technovation, 96, 102131. https://doi.org/10.1016/j.technovation.2020.102131
- Fleuren, B. P., De Grip, A., Kant, I., & Zijlstra, F. R. (2020). Time equals money?: A randomized controlled field experiment on the effects of four types of training vouchers on training participation. Journal of Vocational Behavior, 118, 103403 https://doi.org/10.1016/j.jvb.2020.103403
- Non, A., Rohde, I., De Grip, A., Dohmen, T.(2022). Mission of the company, prosocial attitudes and job preferences: A discrete choice experiment, Labour Economics, 74 (2022) 102087 https://doi.org/10.1016/j.labeco.2021.102087
