= Botanic Garden Zuidas =

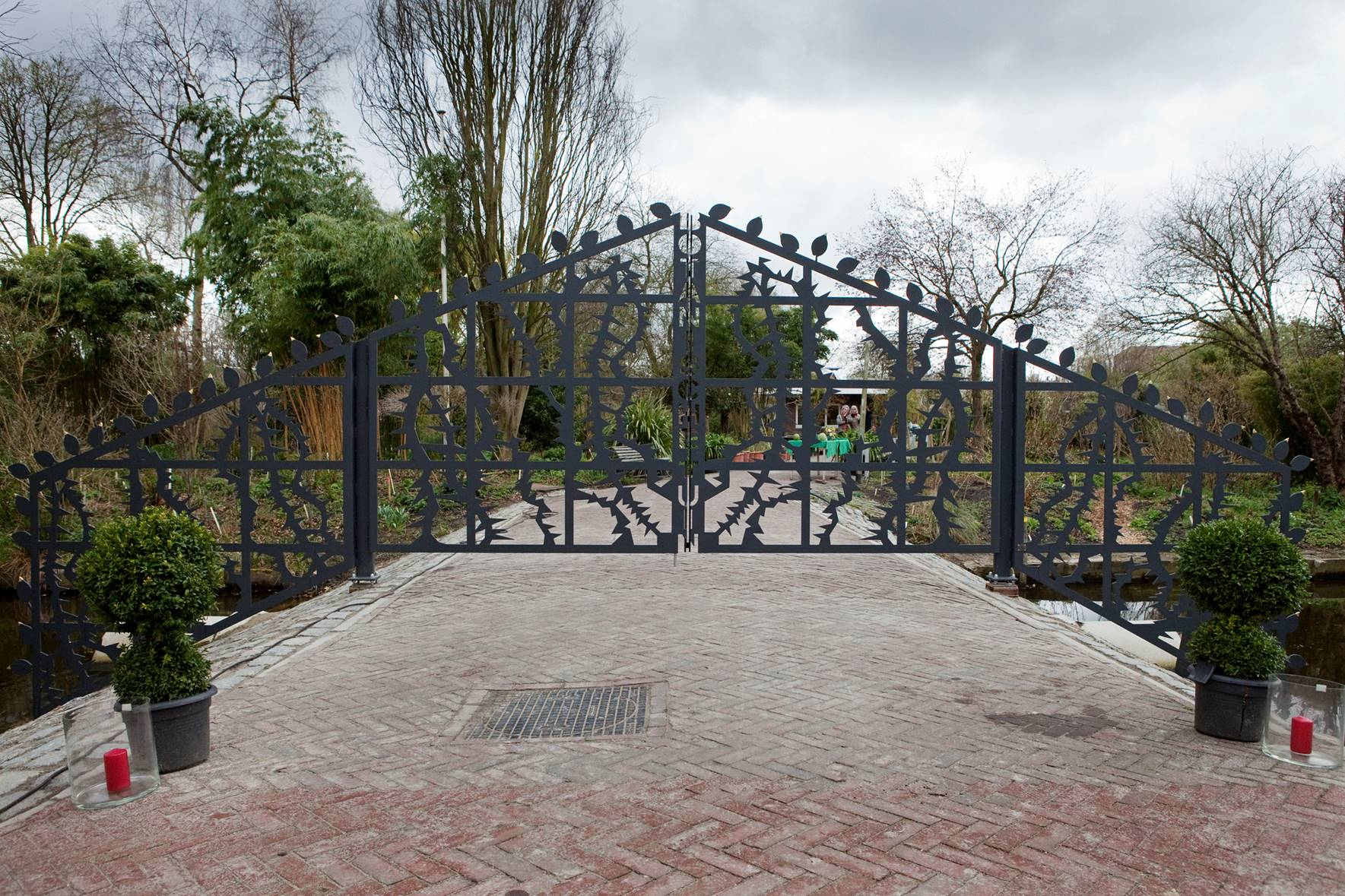
- Entrance gate
- Interactive map of Botanic Garden Zuidas
- Type: Botanical
- Location: Amsterdam, Netherlands
- Coordinates: 52.3326°N 4.8606°E
- Area: 1 hectare (10,000 m^{2})
- Opened: 1967
- Owner: Vrije Universiteit
- Collections: Ferns; Succulents; Chinese garden
- Public transit: VU medisch centrum
- Website: Botanic Garden Zuidas

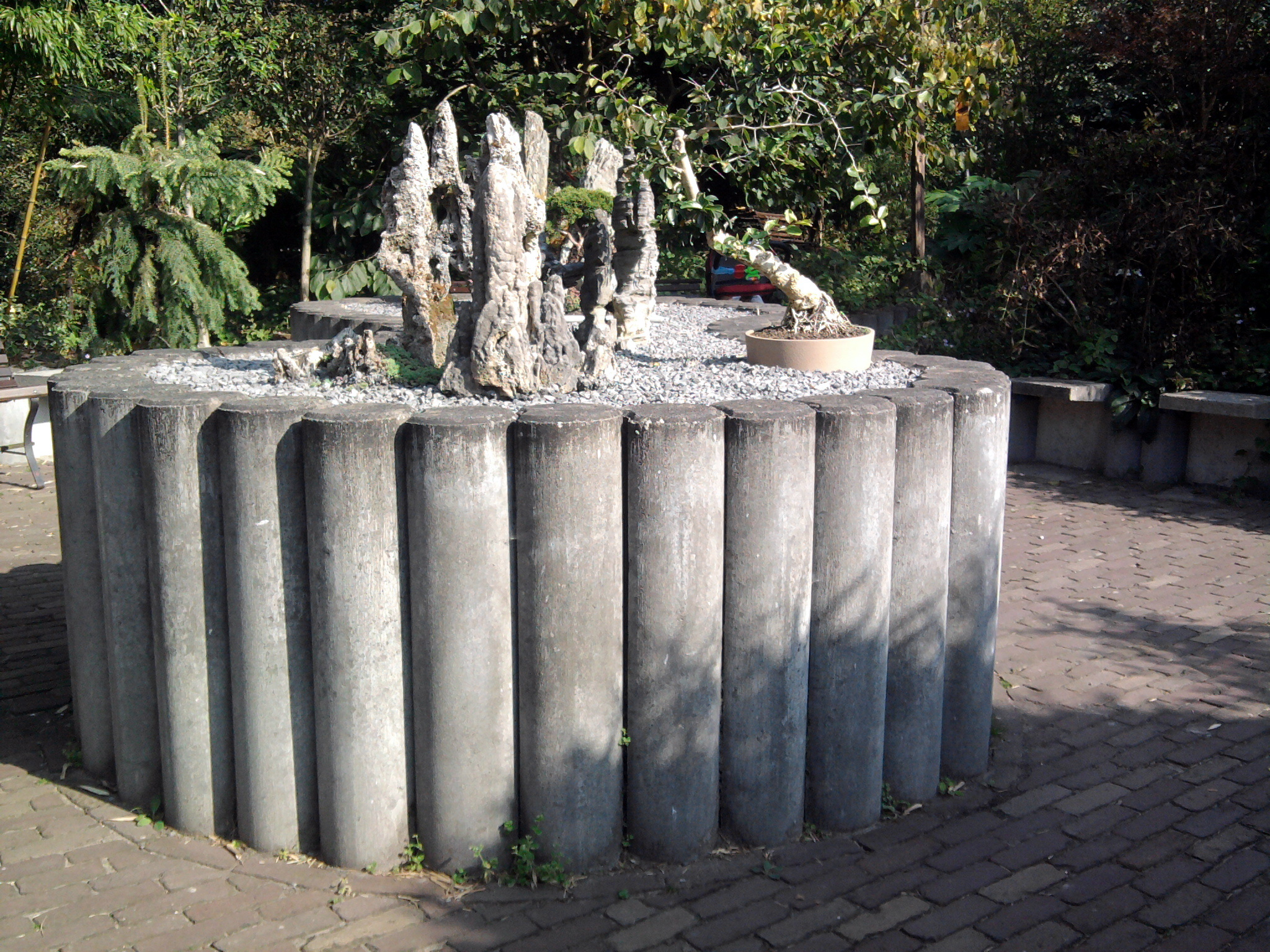
Part of the Chinese garden

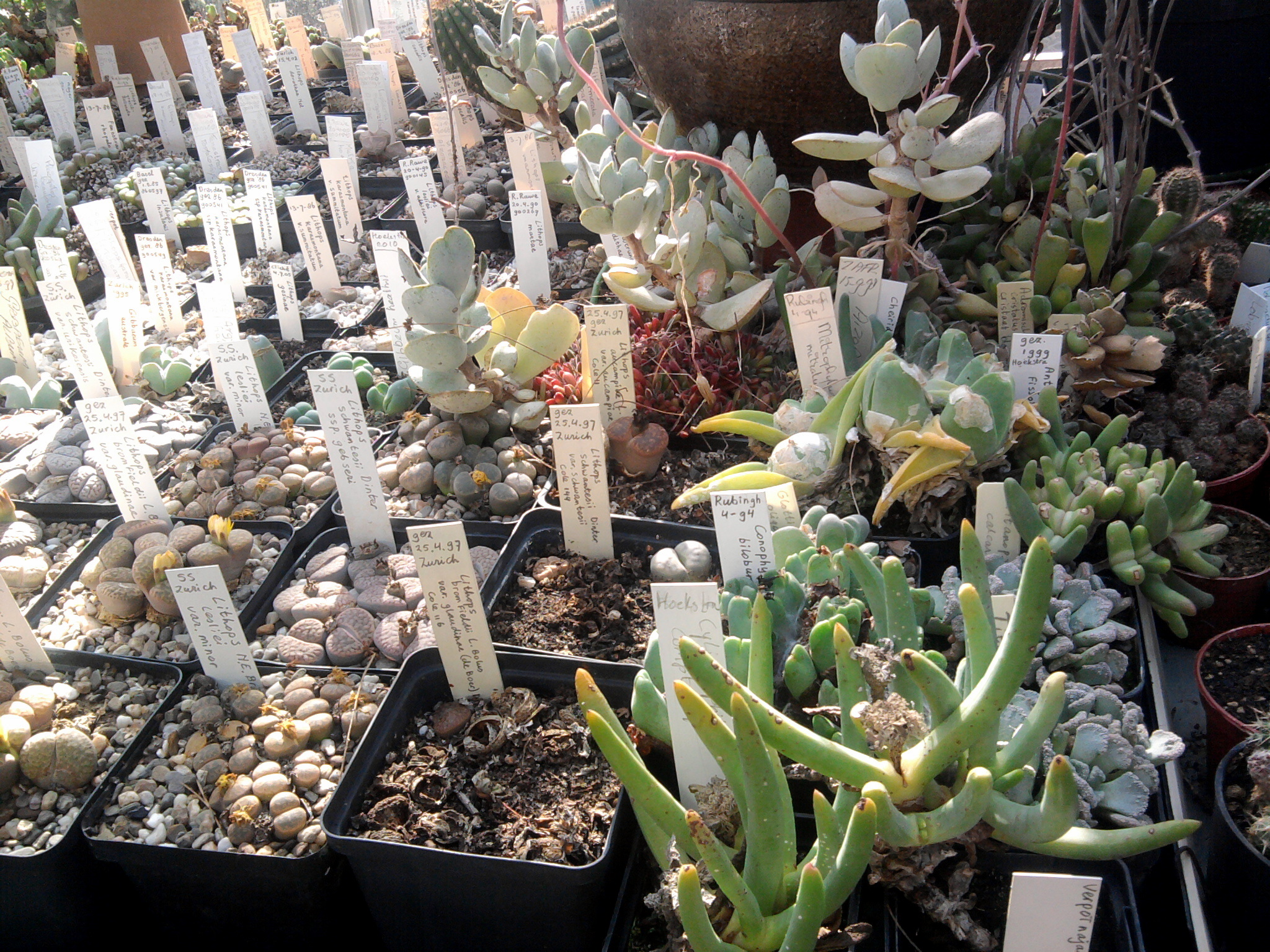
Cacti collection in the succulent greenhouse

The Botanic Garden Zuidas (Dutch: Botanische tuin Zuidas) is a botanical garden belonging to Vrije Universiteit in Amsterdam, Netherlands. It was established in 1967 for the purpose of education and research for the Biology faculty. It is situated behind the University Medical Centre, and includes a garden area of about 1 hectare (2.5 acres) of which about 1,000 square metres (11,000 sq ft) is occupied by glass-houses. Since 1988, the garden no longer has an educational function, but the property is still owned and supported by the university.

The collection includes about 10,000 species, such as varieties of hardy ferns, cacti and succulents. There is also a collection of carnivorous plants and orchids. The garden also accommodates a collection of trees, shrubs and tub plants, among other things.

There is international collaboration with over 500 botanical gardens and numerous Biblical gardens worldwide.

The garden's existence was threatened in 2009, when plans for an expansion of the university hospital called for it to be removed. In 2010, after widespread popular protest, the VU announced the garden could remain. Since then, the hospital has changed its building plans and will now construct its new buildings around the garden, with the garden itself acting as a courtyard. The garden's accessibility will be improved so that hospital patients will be able to enjoy it.

In 2016 the garden changed its name from Hortus Botanicus Vrije Universiteit Amsterdam (which was often abbreviated to VU-Hortus) to its current name, after the better known Zuidas development area it is in.
