= Irrationalism =

Critical views of rationalist philosophy

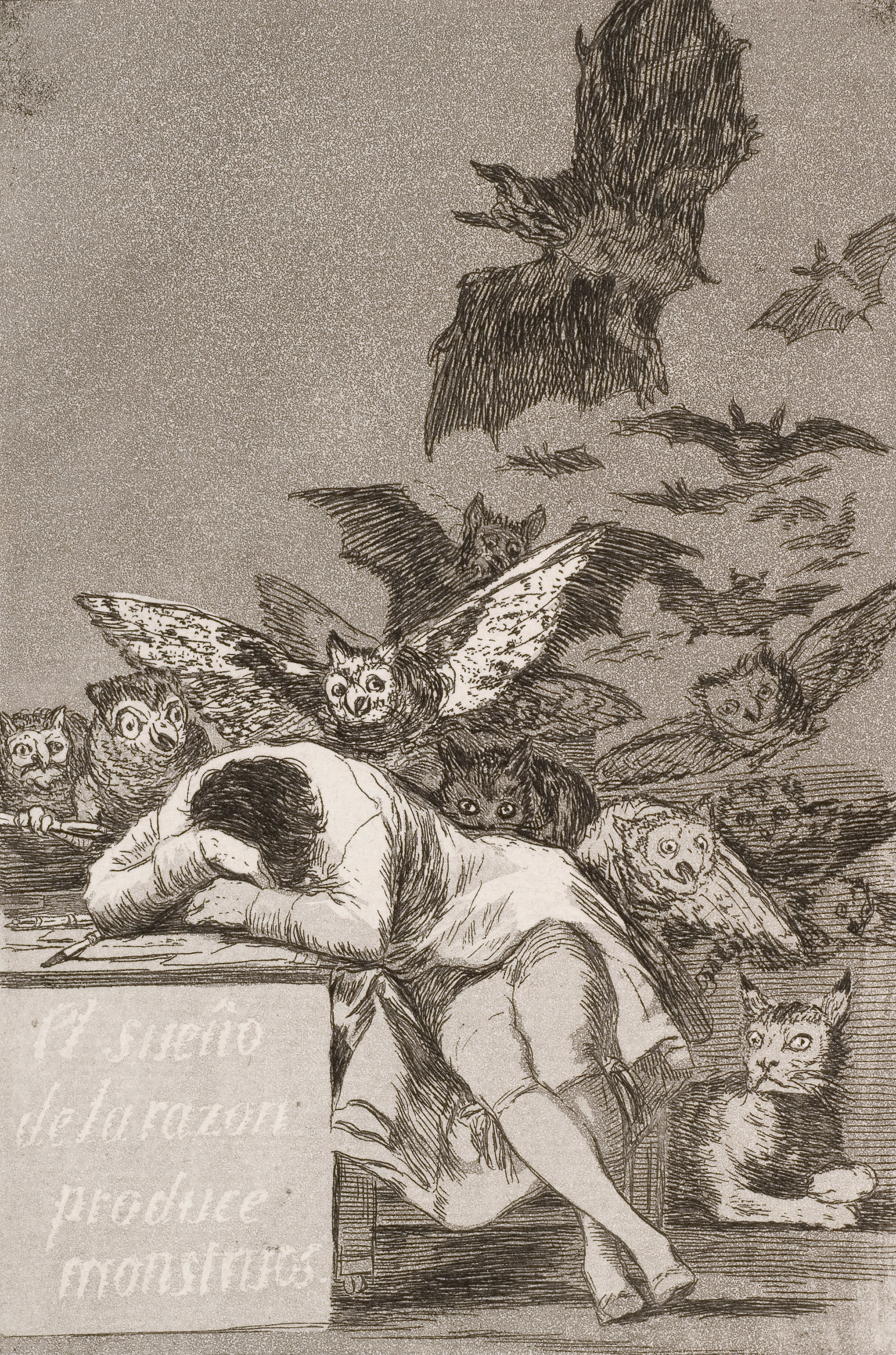
The Sleep of Reason Produces Monsters by Francisco Goya is interpreted to be a statement on irrationalism.

Irrationalism is a philosophical movement that emerged in the early 19th century, emphasizing the non-rational dimension of human life, and criticising rationalism. As they reject logic, irrationalists argue that instinct and feelings are superior to reason in the research of knowledge. The term has often been used as a pejorative designation of criticisms against rationalism as a whole.

The philosophy of rationalism, understood as having first emerged in the writings of Francis Bacon and René Descartes, has received a variety of criticisms since its inception. These may entail a view that certain things are beyond rational understanding, that total rationality is insufficient or even harmful to human life, or that people are not instinctively rational and progressive.

== Overview ==
The term "irrationalism" does not refer to an independent philosophical movement, but is a moment and component of various philosophical movements and systems. Irrationalism in the true sense refers to worldviews that are particularly characterized by the moment of irrationality and that also put rational thinking aside in favor of alternative, higher cognitive functions, often in favor of a certain form of intuition. In this respect, the term has found a more specific use for certain philosophical positions.

The core tenent of irrationalism is to be opposed to philosophy of rationalism. Since the term irrationalism is often used as a derogatory accusation to criticize other positions as unreasonable, unscientific and thus wrong, it is controversial as a scientific category, especially in individual cases. Otherwise, however, the term is often used unspecifically and – like its counterpart, rationalism – in very different meanings.

Depending on the area in which theses on irrationalism are represented, one can distinguish between epistemological and ontological (sometimes metaphysical) positions of irrationalism. The rejection of rationality as the only source of meaningful knowledge has far-reaching effects on the assessment of scientific methodology. Therefore, irrationalist positions are often directed against exclusively rational scientific and social theories of development and progress. Traditions of philosophy are also specifically assessed according to these premises.

== History ==
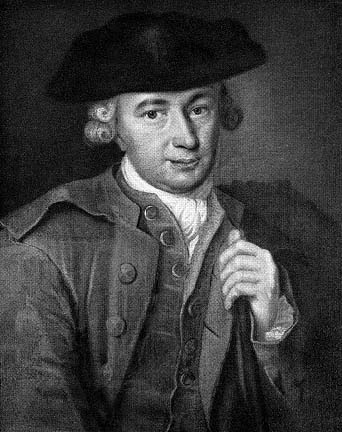
Johann Georg Hamann

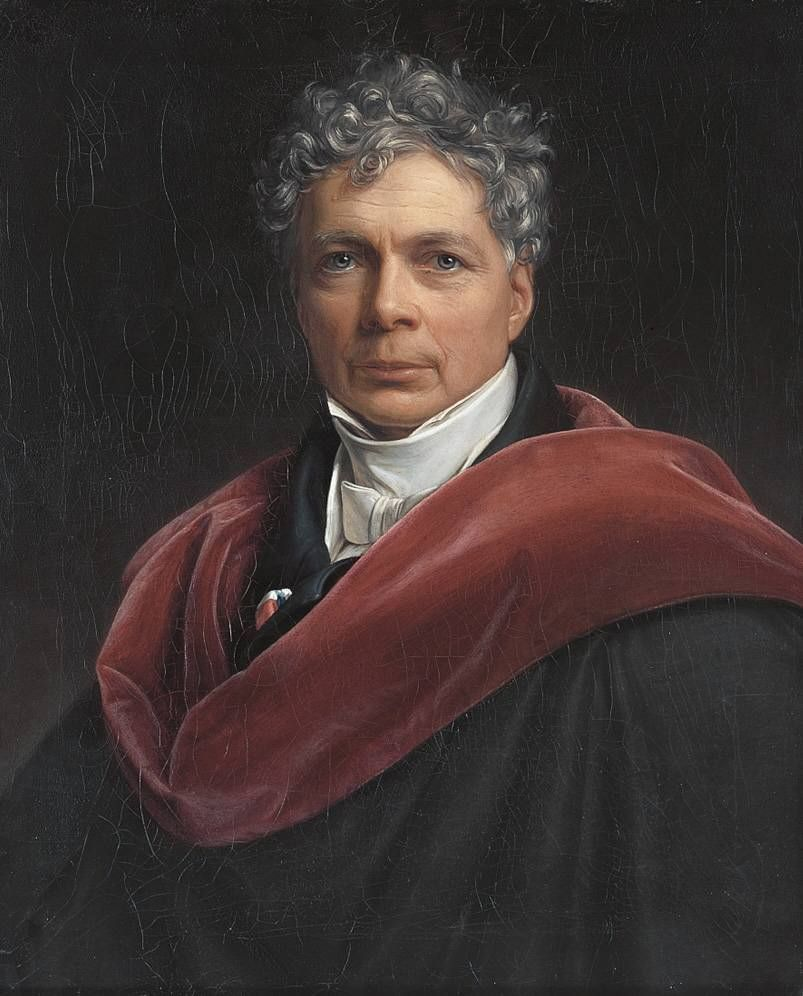
Friedrich Wilhelm Joseph Schelling

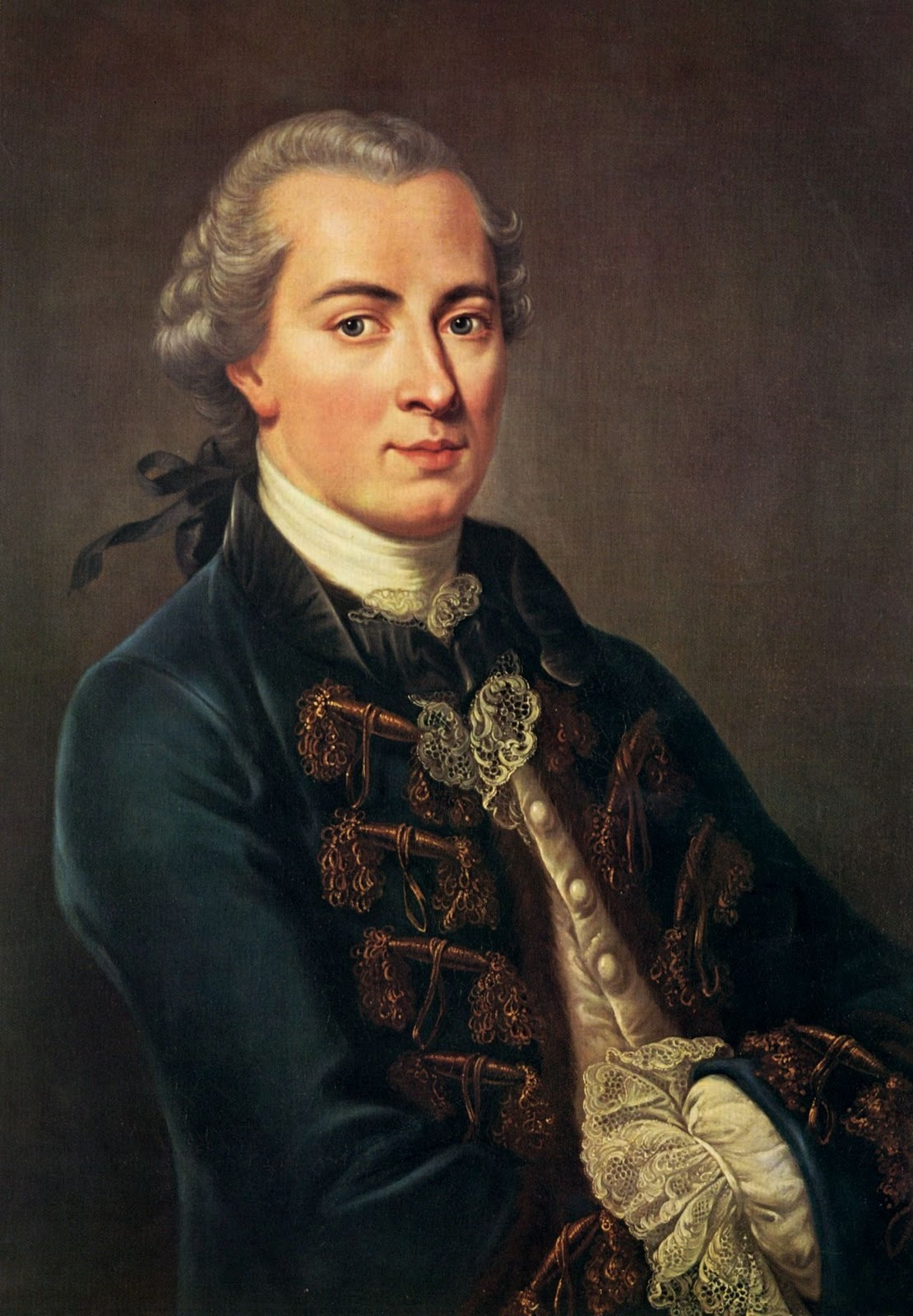
Friedrich Heinrich Jacobi

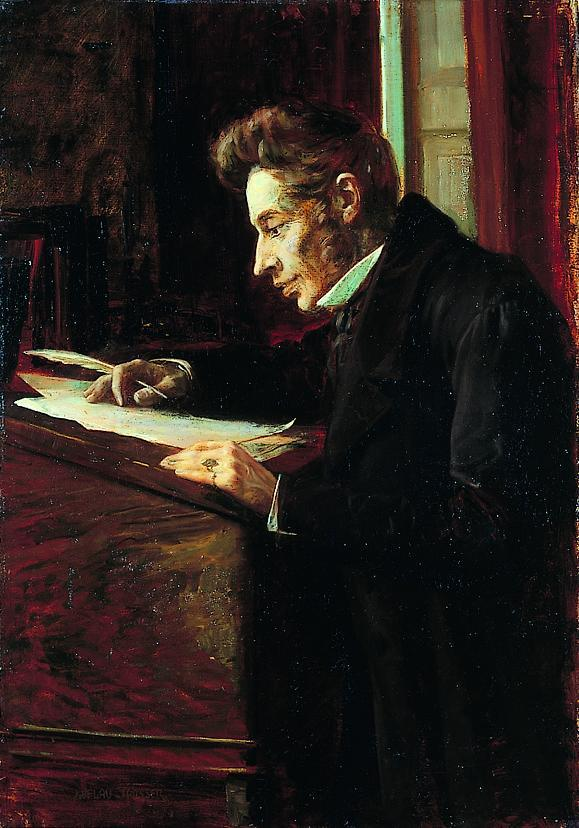
Søren Kierkegaard

Irrationalism has its roots in ancient philosophy, with its foundational elements present in schools such as skepticism, sophism and neo-platonism.

The philosophy of rationalism, specifically classical rationalism, gained prominence during the Enlightenment, and was presented by the works and studies of René Descartes, Gottfried Leibniz, Baruch Spinoza and Immanuel Kant. Regardless, even during the Age of Enlightenment, these thinkers' notions were being already challenged.

Modern irrationalist positions are often traced back to their origins in German idealism and the Romantic movement. Johann Georg Hamann, Friedrich Heinrich Jacobi, and Friedrich Wilhelm Joseph von Schelling are noted pioneers of this philosophy. The common factor for the attribution is usually that of the intellectual views and aesthetic intuitions which Immanuel Kant was opposed to, given a special priority.

Friedrich Engels polemicized that Schelling's 1854 lecture, known as "Philosophie der Offenbarung", was the "first attempt to smuggle belief in authority, emotional mysticism, and gnostic fantasy into the free science of thought." Older histories of philosophy, such as that of Wilhelm Windelband, also characterized Schelling and related positions as "irrationalist metaphysics." Romantic movement has been attributed with an irrationalist attitude, although more recent studies also emphasize that the Age of Enlightenment impulses also arose from the aforementioned movement.

György Lukács has argued that the first period of irrationalism arose with Schelling and Kierkegaard, in a fight against the dialectical concept of progress embraced by German idealism. Irrationalism is notably researched by Italian academics, who study it in regards with the D'Annunzio movement (cultural movement spearheaded by Gabriele D'Annunzio) and Italian Fascism.

Oswald Spengler believed that the materialist vision of Karl Marx was based on nineteenth-century science, while the twentieth century would be the age of psychology:

"We no longer believe in the power of reason over life. We feel that it is life which dominates reason."

— Oswald Spengler. Politische Schriften, 1932.

Numerous historians also trace important elements of the ideology of German National Socialism back to irrationalist, particularly romantic, origins.

== Categories of Irrationalism ==
In philosophy it is agreed to distinguish two major categories of irrationalism; epistemological and ontological (sometimes defined as metaphysical instead).

=== Epistemological irrationalism ===
Representatives of this school of thought declare that human reason alone is incapable of recognizing the foundations, connections and laws of objective reality. As alternatives to descriptive and normative explanations of the world, some "higher" cognitive functions such as essential perception, faith, intuition or "direct experience" are suggested.

In contrast to rationalism, purely rational knowledge is not considered to be true knowledge, which must also rely on feelings, the mind or the soul. These views often play a role in connection with religious, esoteric and occult, but also political views.

This thought is affirmed by the skeptics (Pyrrho, Hume), the agnostics, the sophists, the Kantian idealists, the positivists, the Nietzscheans, etc.

=== Ontological irrationalism ===
For the irrationalist in a metaphysical interpretation, certain areas (such as life, psychological processes, history) are considered irrational, i.e. not exclusively governed by rational laws and laws. Irrationality is declared to be the essence of reality itself, regardless of the human ability to know. The possibility of gaining scientific knowledge in these areas is thus denied.

Apart from mystical positions, the majority of theology in Christianity and other religions rejects this view and instead assumes a natural or divine order. Metaphysical irrationalism can thus also be seen as the opposite of naturalism, although it does not imply any supernatural entities.

This position is taken by mystical thinkers (Eckhart, Boehme), the neoplatonists (Plotinus, Paracelsus), the romantic philosophers (Schelling) and spiritualists (Bergson).

== Forms of Irrationalism ==
There is controversy over whether the term irrationalism is suitable as a historical category and to which positions it can be attributed.

=== Lebensphilosophie ===
History of irrationalism greatly overlaps with that of Lebensphilosophie. Both philosophical movements recognize Arthur Schopenhauer as a major 19th century thinker, with Schopenhauer's ontological irrationalism, describing that world as not organized in a rational way. Since humans are born as bodies-manifestations of an irrational striving for meaning, they are vulnerable to pain and suffering.

Likewise, Friedrich Nietzsche and Henri Bergson are both recognized as Lebensphilosophie pioneers and representatives of irrationalism. In his 1886 book, Beyond Good and Evil, Nietzsche emphasized that humans by nature are irrational and criticized attempts of "rationality" of trying to neglect the fact.

=== Neo-Hegelianism ===
Certain positions of neo-Hegelianism are considered to fall in form of irrationalism.

=== Existentialism ===
Existentialism is considered form of irrationalism. Søren Kierkegaard's assessment of religious belief is controversial. Some attribute fideism to him because he excludes religious truths from access by reason.

An expression of modern irrationalism is the thought of Martin Heidegger in his final phase, who maintains that man's thought goes beyond what metaphysics and science have tried to fix dogmatically, making sure that "... thought will only begin when it realizes that the reason glorified for centuries is the most bitter enemy of thought."

=== Aestheticism (Futurism, Dadaism) ===
Connected to irrationalism is also aestheticism, which arose between the 19th and 20th centuries, particularly present in the West European Decadent movement and the Italian D'Annunzio movement. In his 1889 novel, Il Piacere, which is determined to be partly autobiographical, Gabriele D'Annunzio describes how the aesthete lets himself be guided only by the perennial flow of sensations, without following a logical or moral order.

In the artistic-literary field, the theme of irrationalism, as a reaction to the positivist and rationalist tendencies of bourgeois society, is found both in decadentism and especially in its counterpart: futurism. In it, the exaltation of technology and progress prevails, accompanied by a rejection of pre-established schemes and traditional rules. The use of "free words" testifies, for example, to the will to transgress the logic of syntactic-grammatical constructs, while activism and the intoxication of living are celebrated as key elements of its manifesto.

Finally, the aesthetic current of Dadaism falls within irrationalism. It was born as a protest against the atrocities of the First World War and later became a sort of "artistic nihilism". Reason and logic had left humanity the horrors of war, and the only way of salvation was the rejection of logic to embrace anarchy and the irrational. However, it has been observed that anarchy and the rejection of values and order retain a certain rationality: the systematic destruction of values is not irrational, if one thinks that it must be put into action.

=== Other forms of irrationalism ===
Elements of irrationalism have also been identified by various quarters in some philosophical positions in 20th century philosophy and contemporary philosophy. These attributions are, of course, controversial. They have been made, for example, for:

- Personalism
- certain positions in hermeneutics, including Emil Staiger, Benno von Wiese and Wolfgang Iser, because – according to critics – they rely on a moment of subjective empathy that is resistant to justification. The early Dilthey was also criticized as an "empathy hermeneutic.”
- Tendentious cultural historians such as Oswald Spengler.
- Trumpism and emergent global right-wing populist movement following the 2007-2009 Great Recession have been identified of having elements associated with irrationalism.
- Intuitionist positions in the justification of morality and norms
- Georges Sorel and his theory of violence.
- Pragmatism is also accused of being irrationalist, although there are analysts who contest this claim.
- Jacques Derrida’s philosophy of deconstruction and his criticism of logocentrism as well as post-modern movements in general, such as the philosophy of Georges Bataille or Gilles Deleuze. Others, however, see such labeling as unfounded defamation, which shies away from dealing with the serious criticism of rationality of the corresponding positions.
- Psychoanalysis is also accused of irrationalism which is confused with the unconscious whose analysis is instead directed at reconstructing the rationality of consciousness.

== Irrationalism outside of philosophy ==
Irrational behavior can be useful when used tactically in certain conflict, game and escape situations. The moves of an irrational opponent are not (or only very limitedly) predictable. An irrational negotiator cannot be put under rational pressure.

An indirect tactic is the rational use of the irrationalism of third parties. One concrete implementation of this tactic in human history has been, and continues to be, the use of suicide bombers, particularly in so-called asymmetric warfare.

To the extent that assassinations themselves arise from irrationalism, they can be used rationally, for example with the aim of making profits from conflicts. This is where irrationalism becomes strategic. Tactical irrationality gives rationally fought terrorism its strong effect. Beyond tactics, terrorism can even be understood as strategic irrationality.

Furthermore, strategic irrationalism is an important basis for the development and exploitation of niches in the esoteric market as well as by sectarian religious communities. But even in socially widely accepted market areas, irrationalism is used tactically and strategically. There, it is one of the most important elements of advertising.

In situations comparable to the prisoner's dilemma, irrational behavior in the sense of game theory sometimes has advantages. If both players play irrationally, both achieve a higher profit than if both play rationally. But if only one of the two plays irrationally, he or she incurs the greatest possible loss. Rational play here means maximizing profits regardless of the other's moves.

== Discussion on 20th century Irrationalism ==
In his 1953 work, The Destruction of Reason, György Lukács aimed to demonstrate how the widespread irrationalism in the West, from Friedrich Schelling to Nietzsche, was nothing other than an expression of the crisis experienced by the bourgeois class, which attempted to justify its existence by will to power and imperialist politics.

In opposition to Lukacs, the Frankfurt school elaborated the theory of "negative thinking", taking up the "irrationalist" themes of Nietzsche and logical neo-positivism has detected irrationalist components in the belief in the impossibility of linguistically defining the senseless reality of the world (as seen with Ludwig Wittgenstein) and of demonstrating the validity of the moral and social values of the human being.

Karl Popper also leveled accusations of irrationalism at the philosophies of Hegel and Marx, for having elevated contradiction to a fundamental characteristic of reality. According to Popper, to maintain that reality is intimately contradictory means to evade the criteria of logic and therefore, dishonestly, the very risk of being refuted by the facts. Being manifestly contrary to the principle of non-contradiction, which should guide not only science but also political action, the Hegelian-Marxist dialectic cannot therefore have any real and ontological value.

=== Totalitarianism ===
Questions regarding irrationalism were debated particularly in the twentieth century due to its political connection to the founding ideologies of the main totalitarian states of Europe, that had come into being after the outcome of the First World War, namely the Third Reich (Nazism), the Kingdom of Italy (Fascism) and the Soviet Union (Communism).

Nazism openly referred to the thought of Friedrich Nietzsche, or rather to the version distorted by his sister Elisabeth Förster-Nietzsche, and also to Oswald Spengler's work The Decline of the West. By referring to the irrationalist theories of German vitalism (Lebensphilosophie), these works built a narrative that all civilizations go through a natural cycle of development, flowering and decadence, and that Europe, victim of a narrow materialism and urban chaos, was in the last stage: the winter of a world that had known more fruitful seasons. Europe, unless it managed to purify itself and restore its spiritual values and its original stock, would fall prey to savage policies and wars of annihilation.

Influenced by Goethe, Wilhelm Dilthey, Nietzsche (in particular by his theory of the Eternal Return) and Greek thought, Spengler understood history as a constant process of decay to which it was necessary to react with the establishment of a strongly authoritarian state, partly close to that predicted by the Nazis. György Lukács pointed to combined notions of Oswald Spengler, Martin Heidegger (existentialism), Ludwig Klages (interwar Lebensphilosophie) of giving Nazis the means of mythologizing history to their will, by exploiting epistemology for sake of historical relativism. Lukács stating that;

With Spengler, real history was supplanted by the myths; with Heidegger it sank into unauthenticity; with Klages it was presented as a set of parables on the Fall of man resulting from the dominance of reason and the infamous intellect.

— György Lukács
