= Hermeneutics =

The study of the methodological principles of interpretation

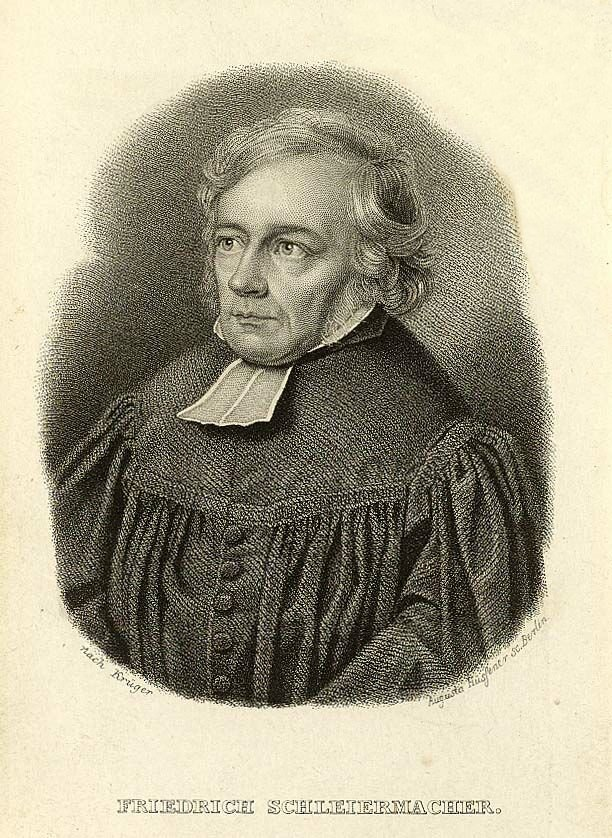
Friedrich Schleiermacher

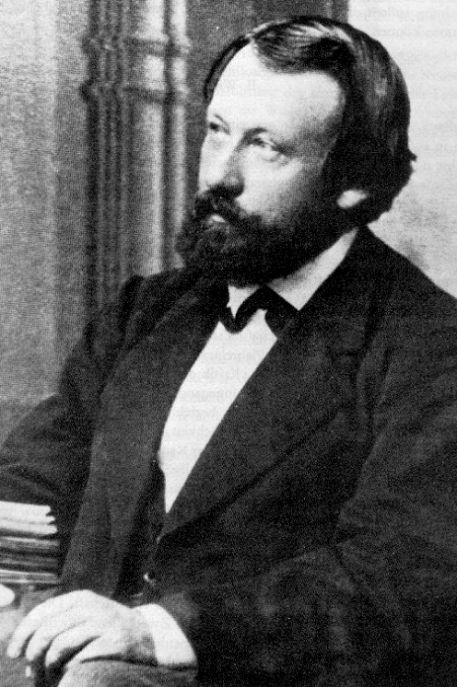
Wilhelm Dilthey

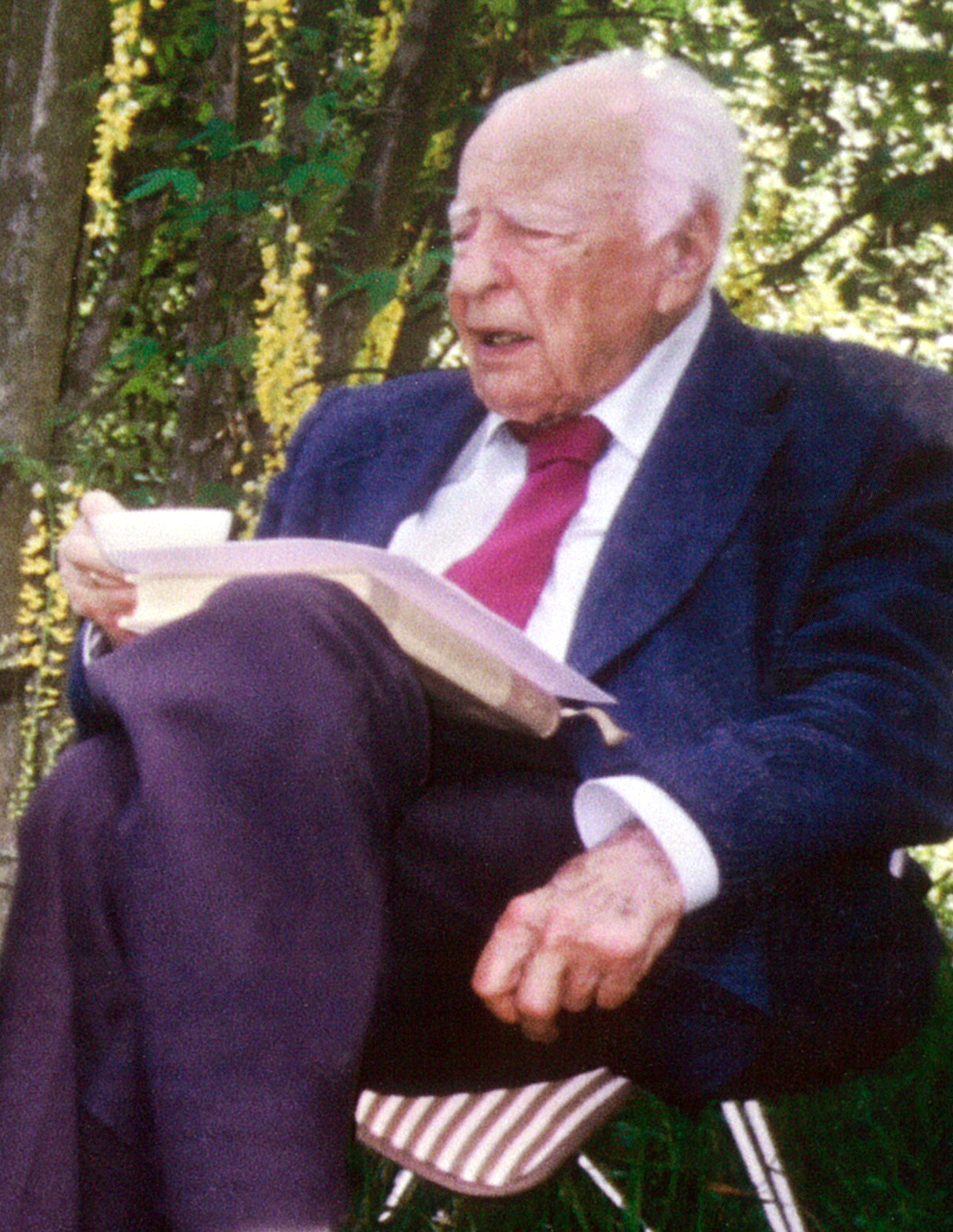
Hans-Georg Gadamer

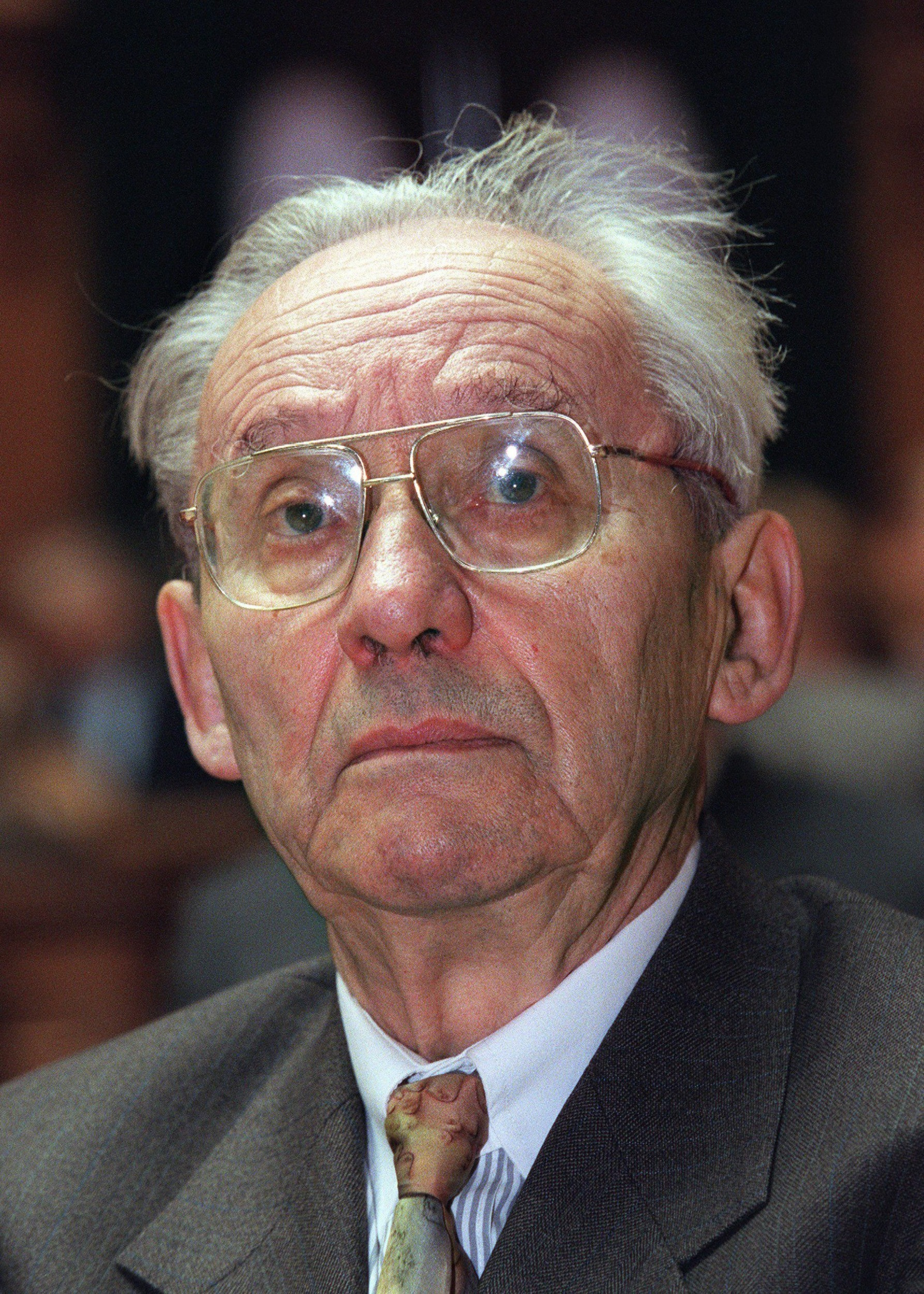
Paul Ricœur

Hermeneutics (/ˌhɜːrməˈnjuːtɪks/) is the study of the methodological principles of interpretation, especially the interpretation of biblical texts, wisdom literature, and philosophical texts. As necessary, hermeneutics may include the art of understanding and communication.

Modern hermeneutics includes both verbal and non-verbal communication, as well as semiotics, presuppositions, and pre-understandings. Hermeneutics has been broadly applied in the humanities, especially in law, history and theology.

Hermeneutics was initially applied to the interpretation, or exegesis, of scripture, and has been later broadened to questions of general interpretation. The terms hermeneutics and exegesis are sometimes used interchangeably. Hermeneutics is a wider discipline which includes written, verbal, and nonverbal communication. Exegesis focuses primarily upon the word and grammar of texts.

Hermeneutic, as a count noun in the singular, refers to some particular method of interpretation (see, in contrast, double hermeneutic).

== Etymology ==
Hermeneutics is derived from the Greek word ἑρμηνεύω (hermēneuō, "translate, interpret"), from ἑρμηνεύς (hermeneus, "translator, interpreter"). While the etymology is uncertain, both R. S. P. Beekes (2009) and Zsolt Simon (2019) suggest an Anatolian (Carian) origin.

The technical term ἑρμηνεία (hermeneia, "interpretation, explanation") was introduced into philosophy mainly through the title of Aristotle's work Περὶ Ἑρμηνείας (Peri Hermeneias), commonly referred to by its Latin title De Interpretatione and translated in English as On Interpretation. It is one of the earliest (c. 360 BCE) extant philosophical works in the Western tradition to deal with the relationship between language and logic in a comprehensive, explicit and formal way.

The early usage of "hermeneutics" places it within the boundaries of the sacred. A divine message must be received with implicit uncertainty regarding its truth. This ambiguity is an irrationality; it is a sort of madness that is inflicted upon the receiver of the message. Only one who possesses a rational method of interpretation (i.e., a hermeneutic) could determine the truth or falsity of the message.

=== Folk etymology ===
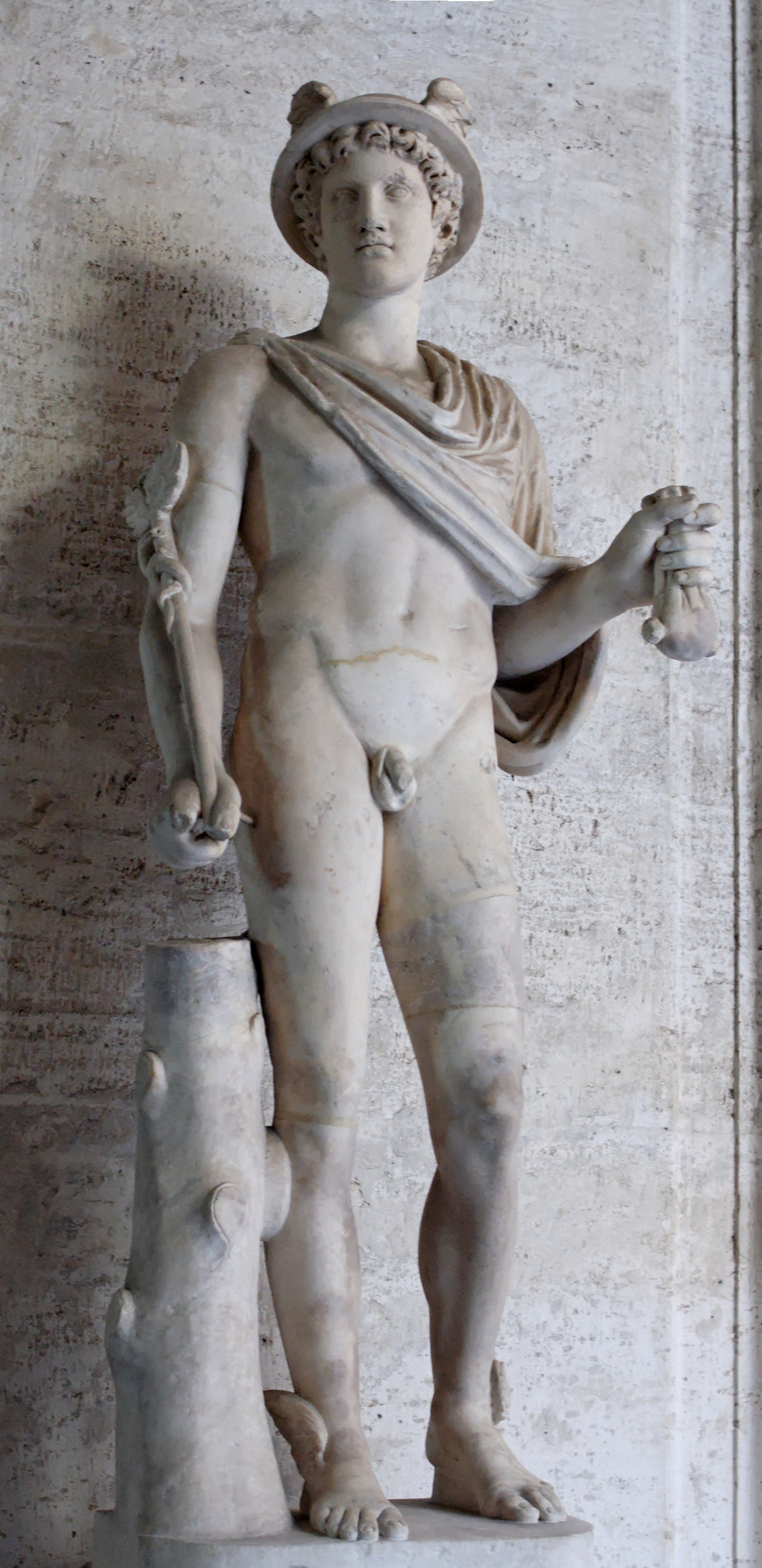
Hermes, messenger of the gods

Folk etymology places its origin with Hermes, the mythological Greek deity who was the 'messenger of the gods'. Aside from being a mediator among the gods and between the gods and men, he led souls to the underworld upon death.

Moreover, Hermes was considered the inventor of language and speech, an interpreter, a liar, a thief, and a trickster. These multiple roles made Hermes an ideal representative figure for hermeneutics. As Socrates noted, words have the power to reveal or conceal and can deliver messages in an ambiguous way. The Greek view of language as consisting of signs that could lead to truth or to falsehood was the essence of Hermes, who was said to relish the uneasiness of those who received the messages he delivered.

== In religious traditions ==
=== Talmudic hermeneutics ===
Summaries of the principles by which Torah can be interpreted date back to, at least, Hillel the Elder, although the thirteen principles set forth in the Baraita of Rabbi Ishmael are perhaps the best known. These principles ranged from standard rules of logic (e.g., a fortiori argument [known in Hebrew as קל וחומר – kal v'chomer]) to more expansive ones, such as the rule that a passage could be interpreted by reference to another passage in which the same word appears (Gezerah Shavah). The rabbis did not ascribe equal persuasive power to the various principles.

Traditional Jewish hermeneutics differed from the Greek method in that the rabbis considered the Tanakh (the Jewish Biblical canon) to be without error. Any apparent inconsistencies had to be understood by means of careful examination of a given text within the context of other texts. There were different levels of interpretation: some were used to arrive at the plain meaning of the text, some expounded the law given in the text, and others found secret or mystical levels of understanding.

=== Vedic hermeneutics ===
Vedic hermeneutics involves the exegesis of the Vedas, the earliest holy texts of Hinduism. The Mimamsa was the leading hermeneutic school and their primary purpose was understanding what Dharma (righteous living) involved by a detailed hermeneutic study of the Vedas. They also derived the rules for the various rituals that had to be performed precisely.

The foundational text is the Mimamsa Sutra of Jaimini (c. 3rd to 1st century BCE) with a major commentary by Śabara (c. the 5th or 6th century CE). The Mimamsa sutra summed up the basic rules for Vedic interpretation.

=== Buddhist hermeneutics ===
Buddhist hermeneutics deals with the interpretation of the vast Buddhist literature, particularly those texts which are said to be spoken by the Buddha (Buddhavacana) and other enlightened beings. Buddhist hermeneutics is deeply tied to Buddhist spiritual practice and its ultimate aim is to extract skillful means of reaching spiritual enlightenment or nirvana. A central question in Buddhist hermeneutics is which Buddhist teachings are explicit, representing ultimate truth, and which teachings are merely conventional or relative.

=== Biblical hermeneutics ===
Biblical hermeneutics is the study of the principles of interpretation of the Bible. While Jewish and Christian biblical hermeneutics have some overlap, they have very different interpretive traditions.

The early patristic traditions of biblical exegesis had few unifying characteristics in the beginning but tended toward unification in later schools of biblical hermeneutics.

Augustine offers hermeneutics and homiletics in his De doctrina christiana. He stresses the importance of humility in the study of Scripture. He also regards the duplex commandment of love in Matthew 22 as the heart of Christian faith. In Augustine's hermeneutics, signs have an important role. God can communicate with the believer through the signs of the Scriptures. Thus, humility, love, and the knowledge of signs are an essential hermeneutical presupposition for a sound interpretation of the Scriptures. Although Augustine endorses some teaching of the Platonism of his time, he recasts it according to a theocentric doctrine of the Bible. Similarly, in a practical discipline, he modifies the classical theory of oratory in a Christian way. He underscores the meaning of diligent study of the Bible and prayer as more than mere human knowledge and oratory skills. As a concluding remark, Augustine encourages the interpreter and preacher of the Bible to seek a good manner of life and, most of all, to love God and neighbor.

There is traditionally a fourfold sense of biblical hermeneutics: literal, moral, allegorical (spiritual), and anagogical.

==== Literal ====
Encyclopædia Britannica states that literal analysis means "a biblical text is to be deciphered according to the 'plain meaning' expressed by its linguistic construction and historical context." The intention of the authors is believed to correspond to the literal meaning. Literal hermeneutics is often associated with the verbal inspiration of the Bible.

==== Moral ====
Moral interpretation searches for moral lessons which can be understood from writings within the Bible. Allegories are often placed in this category.

==== Allegorical ====
Allegorical interpretation states that biblical narratives have a second level of reference that is more than the people, events and things that are explicitly mentioned. One type of allegorical interpretation is known as typological, where the key figures, events, and establishments of the Old Testament are viewed as "types" (patterns). In the New Testament this can also include foreshadowing of people, objects, and events. According to this theory, readings like Noah's Ark could be understood by using the Ark as a "type" of the Christian church that God designed from the start.

==== Anagogical ====
This type of interpretation is more often known as mystical interpretation. It claims to explain the events of the Bible and how they relate to or predict what the future holds. This is evident in the Jewish Kabbalah, which attempts to reveal the mystical significance of the numerical values of Hebrew words and letters.

In Judaism, anagogical interpretation is also evident in the medieval Zohar. In Christianity, it can be seen in Mariology.

== Philosophical hermeneutics ==
=== Modern hermeneutics ===
The discipline of hermeneutics emerged with the new humanist education of the 15th century as a historical and critical methodology for analyzing texts. In a triumph of early modern hermeneutics, the Italian humanist Lorenzo Valla proved in 1440 that the Donation of Constantine was a forgery. This was done through intrinsic evidence of the text itself. Thus, hermeneutics expanded from its medieval role of explaining the true meaning of the Bible.

However, biblical hermeneutics did not die off. For example, the Protestant Reformation brought about a renewed interest in the interpretation of the Bible, which took a step away from the interpretive tradition developed during the Middle Ages back to the texts themselves. Martin Luther and John Calvin emphasized scriptura sui ipsius interpres (scripture interprets itself). Calvin used brevitas et facilitas as an aspect of theological hermeneutics.

The rationalist Enlightenment led hermeneutists, especially Protestant exegetists, to view Scriptural texts as secular classical texts. They interpreted Scripture as responses to historical or social forces so that, for example, apparent contradictions and difficult passages in the New Testament might be clarified by comparing their possible meanings with contemporary Christian practices.

Friedrich Schleiermacher (1768–1834) explored the nature of understanding in relation not just to the problem of deciphering sacred texts but to all human texts and modes of communication.

The interpretation of a text must proceed by framing its content in terms of the overall organization of the work. Schleiermacher distinguished between grammatical interpretation and psychological interpretation. The former studies how a work is composed from general ideas; the latter studies the peculiar combinations that characterize the work as a whole. He said that every problem of interpretation is a problem of understanding and even defined hermeneutics as the art of avoiding misunderstanding. Misunderstanding was to be avoided by means of knowledge of grammatical and psychological laws.

During Schleiermacher's time, a fundamental shift occurred from understanding not merely the exact words and their objective meaning, to an understanding of the writer's distinctive character and point of view.

Nineteenth- and twentieth-century hermeneutics emerged as a theory of understanding (Verstehen) through the work of Friedrich Schleiermacher (Romantic hermeneutics and methodological hermeneutics), August Böckh (methodological hermeneutics), Wilhelm Dilthey (epistemological hermeneutics), Martin Heidegger (ontological hermeneutics, hermeneutic phenomenology, and transcendental hermeneutic phenomenology), Hans-Georg Gadamer (ontological hermeneutics), Leo Strauss (Straussian hermeneutics), Paul Ricœur (hermeneutic phenomenology), Walter Benjamin (Marxist hermeneutics), Ernst Bloch (Marxist hermeneutics), Jacques Derrida (radical hermeneutics, namely deconstruction), Richard Kearney (diacritical hermeneutics), Fredric Jameson (Marxist hermeneutics), and John Thompson (critical hermeneutics).

Regarding the relation of hermeneutics with problems of analytic philosophy, there has been, particularly among analytic Heideggerians and those working on Heidegger's philosophy of science, an attempt to try and situate Heidegger's hermeneutic project in debates concerning realism and anti-realism: arguments have been presented both for Heidegger's hermeneutic idealism (the thesis that meaning determines reference or, equivalently, that our understanding of the being of entities is what determines entities as entities) and for Heidegger's hermeneutic realism (the thesis that (a) there is a nature in itself and science can give us an explanation of how that nature works, and (b) that (a) is compatible with the ontological implications of our everyday practices).

Philosophers that worked to combine analytic philosophy with hermeneutics include Georg Henrik von Wright and Peter Winch. Roy J. Howard termed this approach analytic hermeneutics.

Other contemporary philosophers influenced by the hermeneutic tradition include Charles Taylor (engaged hermeneutics) and Dagfinn Føllesdal.

==== Dilthey (1833–1911) ====
Wilhelm Dilthey broadened hermeneutics even more by relating interpretation to historical objectification. Understanding moves from the outer manifestations of human action and productivity to the exploration of their inner meaning. In his last important essay, "The Understanding of Other Persons and Their Manifestations of Life" (1910), Dilthey made clear that this move from outer to inner, from expression to what is expressed, is not based on empathy, understood as a direct identification with the Other. Interpretation, on a hermeneutical conception of empathy involves an indirect or mediated understanding that can only be attained by placing human expressions in their historical context. Thus, understanding is not a process of reconstructing the state of mind of the author, but one of articulating what is expressed in his work.

Dilthey divided sciences of the mind (human sciences) into three structural levels: experience, expression, and comprehension.

- Experience means to feel a situation or thing personally. Dilthey suggested that we can always grasp the meaning of unknown thought when we try to experience it. His understanding of experience is very similar to that of phenomenologist Edmund Husserl.
- Expression converts experience into meaning because the discourse has an appeal to someone outside of oneself. Every saying is an expression. Dilthey suggested that one can always return to an expression, especially to its written form, and this practice has the same objective value as an experiment in science. The possibility of returning makes scientific analysis possible, and therefore the humanities may be labeled as science. Moreover, he assumed that an expression may be "saying" more than the speaker intends because the expression brings forward meanings which the individual consciousness may not fully understand.
- The last structural level of the science of the mind, according to Dilthey, is comprehension, which is a level that contains both comprehension and incomprehension. Incomprehension means, more or less, wrong understanding. He assumed that comprehension produces coexistence: "he who understands, understands others; he who does not understand stays alone."

==== Heidegger (1889–1976) ====
In the 20th century, Martin Heidegger's philosophical hermeneutics shifted the focus from interpretation to existential understanding as rooted in fundamental ontology, which was treated more as a direct—and thus more authentic—way of being-in-the-world (In-der-Welt-sein) than merely as "a way of knowing." For example, he called for a "special hermeneutic of empathy" to dissolve the classic philosophic issue of "other minds" by putting the issue in the context of the being-with of human relatedness. (Heidegger himself did not complete this inquiry.)

Advocates of this approach claim that some texts, and the people who produce them, cannot be studied by means of using the same scientific methods that are used in the natural sciences, thus drawing upon arguments similar to those of antipositivism. Moreover, they claim that such texts are conventionalized expressions of the experience of the author. Thus, the interpretation of such texts will reveal something about the social context in which they were formed, and, more significantly, will provide the reader with a means of sharing the experiences of the author.

The reciprocity between text and context is part of what Heidegger called the hermeneutic circle. Among the key thinkers who elaborated this idea was the sociologist Max Weber.

==== Gadamer (1900–2002) ====
Hans-Georg Gadamer's hermeneutics is a development of the hermeneutics of his teacher, Heidegger. Gadamer asserted that methodical contemplation is opposite to experience and reflection. We can reach the truth only by understanding or mastering our experience. According to Gadamer, our understanding is not fixed but rather is changing and always indicating new perspectives. The most important thing is to unfold the nature of individual understanding.

Gadamer pointed out that prejudice is an element of our understanding and is not per se without value. Indeed, prejudices, in the sense of pre-judgements of the thing we want to understand, are unavoidable. Being alien to a particular tradition is a condition of our understanding. He said that we can never step outside of our tradition—all we can do is try to understand it. This further elaborates the idea of the hermeneutic circle.

==== New hermeneutic ====
New hermeneutic is the theory and methodology of interpretation to understand Biblical texts through existentialism. The essence of new hermeneutic emphasizes not only the existence of language but also the fact that language is eventualized in the history of individual life. This is called the event of language. Ernst Fuchs, Gerhard Ebeling, and James M. Robinson are the scholars who represent the new hermeneutics.

==== Marxist hermeneutics ====
The method of Marxist hermeneutics has been developed by the work of, primarily, Walter Benjamin and Fredric Jameson. Benjamin outlines his theory of the allegory in his study Ursprung des deutschen Trauerspiels ("Trauerspiel" literally means "mourning play" but is often translated as "tragic drama"). Fredric Jameson draws on Biblical hermeneutics, Ernst Bloch, and the work of Northrop Frye, to advance his theory of Marxist hermeneutics in his influential The Political Unconscious. Jameson's Marxist hermeneutics is outlined in the first chapter of the book, titled "On Interpretation" Jameson re-interprets (and secularizes) the fourfold system (or four levels) of Biblical exegesis (literal; moral; allegorical; anagogical) to relate interpretation to the mode of production, and eventually, history.

==== Objective hermeneutics ====
Karl Popper first used the term "objective hermeneutics" in his Objective Knowledge (1972).

In 1992, the Association for Objective Hermeneutics (AGOH) was founded in Frankfurt am Main by scholars of various disciplines in the humanities and social sciences. Its goal is to provide all scholars who use the methodology of objective hermeneutics with a means of exchanging information.

In one of the few translated texts of this German school of hermeneutics, its founders declared:

Our approach has grown out of the empirical study of family interactions as well as reflection upon the procedures of interpretation employed in our research. For the time being we shall refer to it as objective hermeneutics in order to distinguish it clearly from traditional hermeneutic techniques and orientations. The general significance for sociological analysis of objective hermeneutics issues from the fact that, in the social sciences, interpretive methods constitute the fundamental procedures of measurement and of the generation of research data relevant to theory. From our perspective, the standard, nonhermeneutic methods of quantitative social research can only be justified because they permit a shortcut in generating data (and research "economy" comes about under specific conditions). Whereas the conventional methodological attitude in the social sciences justifies qualitative approaches as exploratory or preparatory activities, to be succeeded by standardized approaches and techniques as the actual scientific procedures (assuring precision, validity, and objectivity), we regard hermeneutic procedures as the basic method for gaining precise and valid knowledge in the social sciences. However, we do not simply reject alternative approaches dogmatically. They are in fact useful wherever the loss in precision and objectivity necessitated by the requirement of research economy can be condoned and tolerated in the light of prior hermeneutically elucidated research experiences.

==== Other recent developments ====
Bernard Lonergan's (1904–1984) hermeneutics is less well known, but a case for considering his work as the culmination of the postmodern hermeneutical revolution that began with Heidegger was made in several articles by Lonergan specialist Frederick G. Lawrence.

Paul Ricœur (1913–2005) developed a hermeneutics that is based upon Heidegger's concepts.

Karl-Otto Apel (1922–2017) elaborated a hermeneutics based on American semiotics. He applied his model to discourse ethics with political motivations akin to those of critical theory.

Jürgen Habermas (1929–2026) criticized the conservatism of previous hermeneutists, especially Gadamer, because their focus on tradition seemed to undermine possibilities for social criticism and transformation. He also criticized Marxism and previous members of the Frankfurt School for missing the hermeneutical dimension of critical theory.

Habermas incorporated the notion of the lifeworld and emphasized the importance for social theory of interaction, communication, labor, and production. He viewed hermeneutics as a dimension of critical social theory.

Rudolf Makkreel (1939–2021) has proposed an orientational hermeneutics that brings out the contextualizing function of reflective judgment. It extends ideas of Kant and Dilthey to supplement the dialogical approach of Gadamer with a diagnostic approach that can deal with an ever-changing and multicultural world.

Andrés Ortiz-Osés (1943–2021) developed his symbolic hermeneutics as the Mediterranean response to Northern Europea hermeneutics. His main statement regarding symbolic understanding of the world is that meaning is a symbolic healing of injury.

Two scholars who have published criticism of Gadamer's hermeneutics are the Italian jurist Emilio Betti (1890–1968) and the American literary theorist E. D. Hirsch (b. 1928)

Other hermeneutic scholars include Jean Grondin (b. 1955) and Maurizio Ferraris (b. 1956).

== Applications ==
=== Archaeology ===
In archaeology, hermeneutics means the interpretation and understanding of material through analysis of possible meanings and social uses.

Proponents argue that interpretation of artifacts is unavoidably hermeneutic because we cannot know for certain the meaning behind them. We can only apply modern values when interpreting. This is most commonly seen in stone tools, where descriptions such as "scraper" can be highly subjective and actually unproven until the development of microwear analysis some thirty years ago.

Opponents argue that a hermeneutic approach is too relativist and that their own interpretations are based on common-sense evaluation.

=== Architecture ===
There are several traditions of architectural scholarship that draw upon the hermeneutics of Heidegger and Gadamer, such as Christian Norberg-Schulz, and Nader El-Bizri in the circles of phenomenology. Lindsay Jones examines the way architecture is received and how that reception changes with time and context (e.g., how a building is interpreted by critics, users, and historians). Dalibor Vesely situates hermeneutics within a critique of the application of overly scientific thinking to architecture. This tradition fits within a critique of the Enlightenment and has also informed design-studio teaching. Adrian Snodgrass sees the study of history and Asian cultures by architects as a hermeneutical encounter with otherness. He also deploys arguments from hermeneutics to explain design as a process of interpretation. Along with Richard Coyne, he extends the argument to the nature of architectural education and design.

=== Education ===
Hermeneutics motivates a broad range of applications in educational theory. The connection between hermeneutics and education has deep historical roots. The ancient Greeks gave the interpretation of poetry a central place in educational practice, as indicated by Dilthey: "systematic exegesis (hermeneia) of the poets developed out of the demands of the educational system."

Gadamer more recently wrote on the topic of education, and more recent treatments of educational issues across various hermeneutical approaches are to be found in Fairfield and Gallagher.

=== Environment ===
Environmental hermeneutics applies hermeneutics to environmental issues conceived broadly to subjects including "nature" and "wilderness" (both terms are matters of hermeneutical contention), landscapes, ecosystems, built environments (where it overlaps architectural hermeneutics ), inter-species relationships, the relationship of the body to the world, and more.

=== International relations ===
Insofar as hermeneutics is a basis of both critical theory and constitutive theory (both of which have made important inroads into the postpositivist branch of international relations theory and political science), it has been applied to international relations.

Steve Smith refers to hermeneutics as the principal way of grounding foundationalist yet postpositivist theory of international relations.

Radical postmodernism is an example of a postpositivist anti-foundationalist paradigm of international relations.

=== Law ===
Some scholars argue that law and theology are particular forms of hermeneutics because of their need to interpret legal tradition or scriptural texts. Moreover, the problem of interpretation has been central to legal theory since at least the 11th century.

In the Middle Ages and Italian Renaissance, the schools of glossatores, commentatores, and usus modernus distinguished themselves by their approach to the interpretation of "laws" (mainly Justinian's Corpus Juris Civilis). The University of Bologna gave birth to a "legal Renaissance" in the 11th century, when the Corpus Juris Civilis was rediscovered and systematically studied by men such as Irnerius and Johannes Gratian. It was an interpretative Renaissance. Subsequently, these were fully developed by Thomas Aquinas and Alberico Gentili.

Since then, interpretation has always been at the center of legal thought. Friedrich Carl von Savigny and Emilio Betti, among others, made significant contributions to general hermeneutics. Legal interpretivism, most famously Ronald Dworkin's, may be seen as a branch of philosophical hermeneutics.

=== Phenomenology ===
In qualitative research, the beginnings of phenomenology stem from German philosopher and researcher Edmund Husserl. In his early days, Husserl studied mathematics, but over time his disinterest with empirical methods led him to philosophy and eventually phenomenology. Husserl's phenomenology inquires on the specifics of a certain experience or experiences and attempts to unfold the meaning of experience in everyday life. Phenomenology started as philosophy and then developed into methodology over time. American researcher Don Ihde contributed to phenomenological research methodology through what he described as experimental phenomenology: "Phenomenology, in the first instance, is like an investigative science, an essential component of which is an experiment." His work contributed heavily to the implementation of phenomenology as a methodology.

The beginnings of hermeneutic phenomenology stem from a German researcher and student of Husserl, Martin Heidegger. Both researchers attempted to pull out the lived experiences of others through philosophical concepts, but Heidegger's main difference from Husserl was his belief that consciousness was not separate from the world but a formation of who we are as living individuals. Hermeneutic phenomenology stresses that every event or encounter involves some type of interpretation from an individual's background, and that we cannot separate this from an individual's development through life. Ihde also focuses on hermeneutic phenomenology within his early work, and draws connections between Husserl and French philosopher Paul Ricoeur's work in the field. Ricoeur focuses on the importance of symbols and linguistics within hermeneutic phenomenology. Overall, hermeneutic phenomenological research focuses on historical meanings and experiences, and their developmental and social effects on individuals.

=== Political philosophy ===
Italian philosopher Gianni Vattimo and Spanish philosopher Santiago Zabala in their book Hermeneutic Communism, when discussing contemporary capitalist regimes, stated that, "A politics of descriptions does not impose power in order to dominate as a philosophy; rather, it is functional for the continued existence of a society of dominion, which pursues truth in the form of imposition (violence), conservation (realism), and triumph (history)." Vattimo and Zabala also stated that they view interpretation as anarchy and affirmed that "existence is interpretation" and that "hermeneutics is weak thought."

In contemporary political hermeneutics, several authors have extended interpretive approaches to the analysis of political crises and social upheaval. In the context of the 2019–2020 Chilean protests, some interpretations have emphasised that the crisis cannot be fully understood through structural or economic explanations alone, but also involves a breakdown in the capacity of political institutions to interpret social reality adequately. Within this line of interpretation, Hugo E. Herrera's October in Chile: Event and Political Understanding (2019) develops a hermeneutic account of political crisis centred on the notion of political understanding.

=== Psychoanalysis ===
Psychoanalysts have made ample use of hermeneutics since Sigmund Freud first gave birth to their discipline. In 1900 Freud wrote that the title he chose for The Interpretation of Dreams "makes plain which of the traditional approaches to the problem of dreams I am inclined to follow...[i.e.] 'interpreting' a dream implies assigning a 'meaning' to it."

The French psychoanalyst Jacques Lacan later extended Freudian hermeneutics into other psychical realms. His early work from the 1930s–1950s is particularly influenced by Heidegger, and Maurice Merleau-Ponty's hermeneutical phenomenology.

=== Psychology and cognitive science ===
Psychologists and cognitive scientists have recently become interested in hermeneutics, especially as an alternative to cognitivism.

Hubert Dreyfus's critique of conventional artificial intelligence has been influential among psychologists who are interested in hermeneutic approaches to meaning and interpretation, as discussed by philosophers such as Martin Heidegger (cf. Embodied cognition) and Ludwig Wittgenstein (cf. Discursive psychology).

Hermeneutics is also influential in humanistic psychology.

=== Religion and theology ===
The understanding of a theological text depends upon the reader's particular hermeneutical viewpoint. Some theorists, such as Paul Ricœur, have applied modern philosophical hermeneutics to theological texts (in Ricœur's case, the Bible).

Mircea Eliade, as a hermeneutist, understands religion as 'experience of the sacred', and interprets the sacred in relation to the profane. The Romanian scholar underlines that the relation between the sacred and the profane is not of opposition, but of complementarity, having interpreted the profane as a hierophany. The hermeneutics of the myth is a part of the hermeneutics of religion. Myth should not be interpreted as an illusion or a lie, because there is truth in myth to be rediscovered. Myth is interpreted by Eliade as 'sacred history'. He introduces the concept of 'total hermeneutics'.

The term was notably used in 2005 by Pope Benedict XVI saying the Second Vatican Council needs to be viewed through the lens of a "hermeneutic of reform" rather than a "hermeneutic of discontinuity and rupture". In subsequent discourse, this has become a "hermeneutic of continuity" contrasted with a "hermeneutic of rupture," and applied to dissident tendencies questioning recent church teaching in general and the teaching of Pope Francis. Following this, the term is now widely used: e.g. of suspicion, of tradition and kenosis, and of synodality. Benedict also spoke of the "hermeneutic of the cross", "of faith" necessary for exegesis, "of unity", while deploring a "hermeneutic of politics". Francis has warned against a "hermeneutic of conspiracy". Pope John Paul II taught a "hermeneutic of the gift".

=== Safety science ===
In the field of safety science, and especially in the study of human reliability, scientists have become increasingly interested in hermeneutic approaches.

It has been proposed by ergonomist Donald Taylor that mechanist models of human behaviour will only take us so far in terms of accident reduction, and that safety science must look at the meaning of accidents for human beings.

Other scholars in the field have attempted to create safety taxonomies that make use of hermeneutic concepts in terms of their categorisation of qualitative data.

=== Sociology ===
In sociology, hermeneutics is the interpretation and understanding of social events through analysis of their meanings for the human participants in the events. It enjoyed prominence during the 1960s and 1970s, and differs from other interpretive schools of sociology in that it emphasizes both context and form within any given social behaviour.

The central principle of sociological hermeneutics is that it is only possible to know the meaning of an act or statement within the context of the discourse or world view from which it originates. Context is critical to comprehension; an action or event that carries substantial weight to one person or culture may be viewed as meaningless or entirely different to another. For example, giving the "thumbs-up" gesture is widely accepted as a sign of a job well done in the United States, while other cultures view it as an insult. Similarly, marking a piece of paper and putting it into a box might be considered a meaningless act unless it is put into the context of an election (the act of putting a ballot paper into a box).

Friedrich Schleiermacher, widely regarded as the father of sociological hermeneutics believed that, in order for an interpreter to understand the work of another author, they must familiarize themselves with the historical context in which the author published their thoughts. His work led to the inspiration of Heidegger's "hermeneutic circle" a frequently referenced model that claims one's understanding of individual parts of a text is based on their understanding of the whole text, while the understanding of the whole text is dependent on the understanding of each individual part. Hermeneutics in sociology was also heavily influenced by Gadamer.

== Criticism ==
Jürgen Habermas criticizes Gadamer's hermeneutics (see above) as being unsuitable for understanding society because it is unable to account for questions of social reality, like labor and domination.

== See also ==
- Allegorical interpretations of Plato
- Authorial intent
- Christian views on the Old Covenant
- Close reading
- Gymnobiblism
- Historical poetics
- Historicism
- Narrative inquiry
- Parallelomania
- Pesher
- Philology
- Principle of charity
- Quranic hermeneutics
- Reader-response criticism
- Structuration theory
- Symbolic anthropology
- Tafsir
- Christian theosophy
- Truth theory

=== Notable precursors ===
- Georg Anton Friedrich Ast
- Johann August Ernesti
- Johann Gottfried Herder
- Friedrich August Wolf

== Bibliography ==
- Aristotle, On Interpretation, Harold P. Cooke (trans.), in Aristotle, vol. 1 (Loeb Classical Library), pp. 111–179. London: William Heinemann, 1938.
- Clingerman, F. and B. Treanor, M. Drenthen, D. Ustler (2013), Interpreting Nature: The Emerging Field of Environmental Hermeneutics, New York: Fordham University Press.
- De La Torre, Miguel A., "Reading the Bible from the Margins," Orbis Books, 2002.
- Fellmann, Ferdinand, "Symbolischer Pragmatismus. Hermeneutik nach Dilthey", Rowohlts deutsche Enzyklopädie, 1991.
- Forster, Michael N., After Herder: Philosophy of Language in the German Tradition, Oxford University Press, 2010.
- Ginev, Dimitri, Essays in the Hermeneutics of Science, Routledge, 2018.
- Khan, Ali, "The Hermeneutics of Sexual Order".
- Köchler, Hans, "Zum Gegenstandsbereich der Hermeneutik", in Perspektiven der Philosophie, vol. 9 (1983), pp. 331–341.
- Köchler, Hans, "Philosophical Foundations of Civilizational Dialogue: The Hermeneutics of Cultural Self-comprehension Versus the Paradigm of Civilizational Conflict." International Seminar on Civilizational Dialogue (3rd: 15–17 September 1997: Kuala Lumpur), BP171.5 ISCD. Kertas kerja persidangan / conference papers. Kuala Lumpur: University of Malaya Library, 1997.
- Mantzavinos, C. Naturalistic Hermeneutics, Cambridge University Press, 2005. ISBN 978-0-521-84812-1.
- Oevermann, U. et al. (1987): "Structures of meaning and objective Hermeneutics". In: Meha, V. et al. (eds.). Modern German Sociology. European Perspectives: a Series in Social Thought and Cultural Ctiticism. New York: Columbia University Press, pp. 436–447.
- Olesen, Henning Salling, ed. (2013): "Cultural Analysis and In-Depth Hermeneutics." Historical Social Research, Focus, 38, no. 2, pp. 7–157.
- Przyłębski, Andrzej. The Value of Motherland: An Introduction to a Hermeneutic Philosophy of Politics, LIT Verlag, Zurich 2022.
- Przyłębski, Andrzej. Hermeneutics Between Philosophy and Theology: The Imperative to Think the Incommensurable, Germany, Münster: LIT Verlag, 2010.
- Wierciński, Andrzej. Ethics in the Light of Hermeneutical Philosophy, LIT Verlag, Zurich 2017.
