= Sigurd Bergmann =

German-Swedish theologian

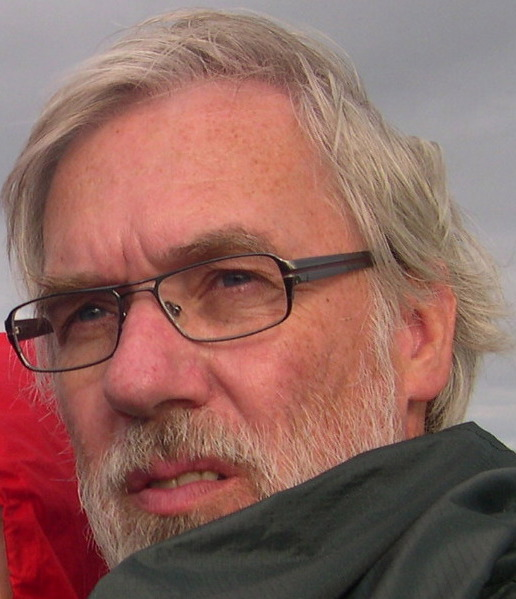
- Born: 5 January 1956 (age 70); Hannover, Germany
- Title: Theologian, Religious Studies scholar
- Theological work
- Main interests: Contextual theology, Patristics, Religion and the Environment, Religion and visual arts & architecture

Sigurd Bergmann (born 1956 in Hannover) is a German-Swedish theologian and scholar of religion. He is a professor at the Department of Philosophy and Religious Studies of the Norwegian University of Science and Technology in Trondheim, and an alumni fellow of the Rachel Carson Center for Environment and Society at LMU Munich.

His studies concerned the relationship between the image of God and the view of nature in late antiquity, the methodology of contextual theology, visual arts in the indigenous Arctic and Australia, as well as visual arts, architecture and religion, and religion in climate change.

More recently, Bergmann is focused on the amalgamation of “space and religion” (explored in a broad range of sites and fields such as Asian geomancy, Mayan sacred geography, urban spirituality, theology in built environments, and the “aesth/ethics of space”); sacred architecture as critical place in urban environments, and interaction of religion with images and practices with regard to weather.

== Education and professional history ==
Sigurd Bergmann attended the University of Göttingen, where he studied theology, Greek, philosophy and art history, with interim examination in 1976, and the University of Uppsala, where he graduated theology in 1980. He received his doctoral degree from the University of Lund in 1995 as a student of Lars Thunberg, Per Erik Persson and Per Frostin. He received his docent title in 1996.

From 1980 to 1988 he worked as an ordained minister in the diocese of Lund of the Lutheran Church of Sweden. Prior to his professorship in Trondheim, he was a fellow of the Swedish Research Council at the Department of Art History of the University of Tromsø, and taught systematic theology at universities of Gothenburg and Lund, where he also taught at the Department of Human Ecology. In December–February 2011/2012 he worked as a visiting research fellow at the Rachel Carson Center for Environment and Society founded by LMU Munich and Deutsches Museum.

Apart from ministerial and teaching work, Bergmann also conducted field and site studies in the Sámi Arctic, Peruvian Andes, Aboriginal Australia, Mayan Yucatan, Korea, Kyrgyzstan and Tanzania, and has published more than 300 publications since 1985, including a number of Nordic anthologies on the themes of diaconia, power, autonomy, ordinary life culture and pluralism.

== Academic profile ==
The golden thread of Bergmann's research is to explore how images of nature and images of God and/or Sacred interact and emerge in specific contexts, and how these impact on ethics, worldviews and practices in these contexts. His first study (1995) investigated this theme in 4th century (Greek) theological sources in a subtle, methodologically unique correlation to contemporary discourses of environmental theology. The book, resulting from this research, was published in German by Matthias-Grünewald-Verlag (1995), in Russian (Arkhangelsk 1999), and in English in the series Sacra Doctrina by Eerdmans, USA (2005). Jürgen Moltmann characterized its content as “an extraordinarily expansive work whose wealth of material links quite disparate fields and whose surprising associations open up completely new vistas”, lauded its “ingenuousness” and the “exemplary structural clarity”, “alongside the enormous wealth of the material”, and praised the author who “rather than moving about in the uncontested theological mainstream, he delights in transgressing boundaries”. The book was extensively reviewed and its main ideas were discussed in separate book chapters; the American Academy of Religion arranged a seminar to launch it at its yearly congress in 2003.

This first study distinctively elaborated the significance of the context for the development of theological thinking, a theme that was mined deeper in the second study on the paradigmatic revision of theological method. It introduced new methodology into Scandinavian countries where it was widely used, and the English edition (2003) represented the fourth internationally influential book on theological method with a particular emphasis on cultural and human ecological analysis: recently a separate chapter in Angie Pears’ Doing Contextual Theology (2009) was dedicated to it. While the first study carefully linked the theological exploration to approaches in Life Sciences, the second study established a sustainable synthesis of Cultural Studies and Religious Studies and applied this to Theology, a process that further evolved the transdisciplinary character of Bergmann's work.

In 1996 Bergmann's research offered a surprising turnaround, by approaching the field of contemporary Sami visual arts, an area rather neglected by art history. A year long process of collecting material in the Nordic sub-Arctic was supported by the Swedish Research Council, later also by the Norwegian Research Council (which made it possible to explore comparative fields in Peru and Australia). The study was conducted with a highly complex, new methodology where tools from art history, art anthropology, human ecology, religious studies and theology were interwoven in order to explore the deep chord of understandings of nature, religion, art and ethnicity (published in an extensive volume Så främmande det lika/So strange the similar (2009).

As the theoretical reflection of this field appeared as fragmentarily one-eyed, this research led Bergmann also to a specific investigation, published in a dense monograph In the Beginning is the Icon (2003, 2009), which has generated extensive comments in several international reviews, and which distinguished philosopher of religion Nicholas Wolterstorff (Yale), declared “a breakthrough in theological aesthetics”. This book is now widely read and used in different fields such as art history, comparative religion, philosophy, and cinema theory.

== Research ==
Bergmann has conducted field and site studies in the Sámi Arctic, Peruvian Andes, Aboriginal Australia, Mayan Yucatan, Korea, Kyrgyzstan and Tanzania, and he has published more than 300 publications since 1985, including a number of Nordic anthologies on the themes of diaconia, power, autonomy, ordinary life culture and pluralism.

In the 1990s, he worked as a secretary for the Nordic Forum of Contextual Theology, and initiated and founded the Institute of Contextual Theology in Lund. Between 2002 and 2005 he participated in the Norwegian national research program on Religion in the Age of Globalization. He has also co-managed the interdisciplinary research group on Technical spaces of mobility (2003–07) and initiated and chaired the executive committee for the European Forum on the Study of Religion and Environment since 2005, when he convened the European Science Foundation's (ESF) workshop on Religion and the Environment in Europe.

== Awards, honors and service ==
In 1993 Bergmann was conferred the award for ”younger promising research in environmental sciences” by Lund University's Centre for Environmental Science and Minister of the Environment Anna Lindh.

He is a member of the Royal Norwegian Society of Sciences and Letters (and leader of its section for philosophy, history of ideas & religion 2009–2011). He is the editor of the Series "Studies in Religion and the Environment/Studien zur Religion und Umwelt" at LIT Verlag (Berlin-Münster-Wien-Zürich-London), as well as member of several editorial boards, including series "Studies in Environmental Humanities" at Brill Rodopi (Leiden); Norsk Teologisk Tidskrift (Oslo); Junge Kirche (Uelzen); Blackwell Compass Religion/Christianity (Oxford); Ecotheology: The Journal of Religion, Nature and the Environment (London); Orizonturi Teologice (University of Oradea, Romania); Philosophy Activism Nature (Melbourne, Australia); Worldviews: Global Religions, Culture and Ecology (Los Angeles). Furthermore, Bergmann serves as member of the Board of Advisors for the “International Society for the Study of Religion, Nature and Culture”, University of Florida (2005- ), as member of the steering committee for the international network “Christian Faith and the Earth”, headed by E. Conradie, University of Western Cape, and as cooperating partner in the Nordic Network for Interdisciplinary Environmental Studies.

== Reception ==
Bergmann has been the invited contributor and keynote speaker at a large number of national, Nordic and international conferences and events (on all continents) in the fields of religion, theology, environment, arts, architecture and culture, and has served as a referee for a wide range of evaluations for the international foundations, national research councils in Europe, universities, academic journals and international publishers in Europe, Canada, the US and Australia.

His works have been widely acknowledged and reviewed in many journals such as Church History (Chicago); Revista Latinoamericana de Teologia (San Salvador); Revista Eclesiastica Brasiliana; Modern Believing (London); Tijdschrift voor Theologie (Nijmegen); Junge Kirche (Bremen); Theologie und Philosophie (Freiburg); Religious Studies; Swedish Theological Quarterly (Lund); Kirke og Kultur (Oslo); Ecotheology (Liverpool); Journal for the Study of Religion, Nature and Culture (Gainesville, Florida); Norsk Teologisk Tidskrift (Oslo); Finsk Teologisk Tidskrift (Helsinki); Religion and the Arts (Boston); Journal of the Society for Pentecostal Studies; International Society for Environmental Ethics; Journal of Early Christian Studies; Cultural Encounters; ASA (American Scientific Affiliation: A Fellowship of Christians in Science); CHOICE Magazine; Environment & Planning B; Billedkunst (Oslo); Practical Theology (London); Norsk antropologisk tidsskrift (Oslo); Contemporary Aesthetics (Castine, ME); Transpositions (University of St Andrews); Journal of Media and Religion; Reviews in Religion & Theology; Journal of Policy Research in Tourism, Leisure and Events; Journal of Transport Geography; Midwest Book Review; Time and Mind; International Journal of Practical Theology; Anthropos, and Theologische Literaturzeitung.

Bergmann's leadership in the international field of the study of religion and the environment is well documented. He initiated (with support from the European Science Foundation) the European Forum for the Study of Religion and the Environment and served as its elected chair (2005–11). The powerful European body (today with more than 120 active scholars) belongs to the four most dynamic and influential international structures in the research area. His own contribution to this field has since 1999 elaborated avant-garde research about space/place & religion, nurtured by his concept of “aesth/ethics”. This has transformed the study of architecture and urban space in cooperation with scholars in other disciplines by mining deeper the religious dimension of human spatial design. A dense monograph on the philosophical depth of this theme was published in Germany (Raum und Geist, 2010). An essay on the survey of this research field was widely received and used in different disciplines. An extensive monograph was published in 2014 (Religion, Space and the Environment, 2nd ed. 2016).

Deepening further the exploration of belief, ethics and space and expanding it to technology and motion, Bergmann co-led the interdisciplinary research project (12 scholars in different disciplines) “Technical Spaces of Mobility” (2003–07) which has generated unique groundbreaking insights into the human dimension of mobility. One of its publications was described by Peter Scott as “fresh, pioneering (...) Introducing new questions and methodologies, this ‘must-read’ volume marks an important contribution to the bourgeoning scholarly discussion of mobility".

Bergmann's cooperation with climatologist Dieter Gerten, which was supported by the Potsdam Institute for Climate Impact Research, the NTNU and the Volkswagen Stiftung, led to three international workshops and two pioneering publications on the theme of religion in ongoing climatic change. His two publications on architecture, religion, and aesthetics (2005 and 2009) serve as standard works for the study field of sacred architecture.

Since 1997 Bergmann has supervised nine PhD students; six hold academic positions in Sweden, Norway, Belgium and Ghana. He has appointed and supervised three post-doc-scholars, who now hold assistant professorships in sustainable education, comparative religion, and ethics in global political studies, respectively.

== Selected publications ==
-Geist, der Natur befreit: Die trinitarische Kosmologie Gregors von Nazianz im Horizont einer ökologischen Theologie der Befreiung (Mainz: Grünewald 1995); Russian edition Arkhangelsk: University Press 1999; revised English edition Creation Set Free: The Spirit as Liberator of Nature (Grand Rapids: Eerdmans 2005, with a preface by Jürgen Moltmann)

-Geist, der lebendig macht: Lavierungen zur ökologischen Befreiungstheologie, (Frankfurt/M.: Verlag für interkulturelle Kommunikation 1997)

-God in Context: A Survey on Contextual Theology, (Aldershot: Ashgate 2003, with a preface by Mary C. Grey)

-Architecture, Aesth/Ethics and Religion (ed.) (Frankfurt/M. and London: Verlag für interkulturelle Kommunikation 2005)

-Spaces of Mobility: The Planning, Ethics, Engineering and Religion of Human Motion, (ed. with T. Hoff and T. Sager, London: Equinox 2008)

-The Ethics of Mobilities: Rethinking Place, Exclusion, Freedom and Environment, (ed. with T. Sager, Farnham and Burlington VT: Ashgate 2008)

-In the Beginning Is the Icon: A Liberative Theology of Images, Visual Arts and Culture, (London: Equinox 2009, with a preface by Nicholas Wolterstorff)

-Så främmande det lika:Samisk konst i ljuset av religion och globalisering ("So Strange so Similar: Sami Arts, Religion & Globalization", Trondheim: Tapir 2009)

-Theology in Built Environments – Exploring Religion, Architecture, and Design, (ed., New Brunswick and London: Transaction 2009)

-Religion, Ecology & Gender:East-West Perspectives, (ed. with Kim, Y.-B., Berlin-Münster-Wien-Zürich-London: LIT 2009)

-Nature, Space and the Sacred: Transdisciplinary Perspectives, (ed. with P. Scott et al., Farnham and VT: Ashgate 2009)

-Raum und Geist: Zur Erdung und Beheimatung der Religion – Eine theologische Ästh/Ethik des Raums, (Göttingen: Vandenhoeck & Ruprecht 2010)

-Religion and Dangerous Environmental Change: Transdisciplinary Perspectives on the Ethics of Climate and Sustainability, (ed. with D. Gerten, Berlin-Münster-Wien-Zürich-London: LIT 2010)

-Religion som rörelse: Exkursioner i rum, tro och mobilitet, ("Religion as Movement", Trondheim: Tapir 2010)

-Ecological Awareness: Exploring Religion, Ethics and Aesthetics, (ed. with H. Eaton, Berlin-Münster-Wien-Zürich-London: LIT 2010)

-Religion in Global Environmental and Climate Change: Sufferings, Values, Lifestyles, (ed. with D. Gerten, New York and London: Continuum 2011)

-Religion, Space & the Environment, (New Brunswick NJ: Transaction Publishers 2014/2016)

-Christian Faith and the Earth: Current Paths and Emerging Horizons in Ecotheology, (ed. with E. Conradie, C. Deane-Drummond and D. Edwards, New York and London: Bloomsbury 2014)

-Spaces in-between: Cultural and Political Perspectives on Environmental Discourse, (ed. with M. Luccarelli, (Studies in Environmental Humanities, Vol. 2), Leiden: Brill Rodopi 2015)

-Technofutures, Nature and the Sacred: Transdisciplinary Perspectives, (ed. with C. Deane-Drummond and B. Szerszynski, Farnham: Ashgate 2015)

-Worldviews: Global Religions, Culture, Ecology, Special Issue “Spatial Turns”, (Guest editor), Worldviews: Global Religions, Culture, Ecology, Volume 20, Number 3, 2016

-Religion in the Anthropocene, (ed. with C. Deane-Drummond and M. Vogt, Eugene OR: Wipf & Stock Cascade 2017)

-Exploring Nature’s Texture: Engaging Environments Through Visual Arts and Religion, (ed. with F. Clingerman, (Studies in Environmental Humanities), Leiden: Brill Rodopi, forthcoming).
