= Mantzavinos =

Mantzavinos (Greek: Μαντζαβίνος) is a surname, named after the western Greek village of Mantzavinata. Notable people with the surname include:

- C. Mantzavinos (born 1968), professor of philosophy at the University of Athens
- Spiros Mantzavinos (fl. 2021–present), American politician from Delaware
- Tassos Mantzavinos (born 1958), Greek painter
