= Hermeneutics of faith =

Hermeneutics of faith, the counterpart to hermeneutics of suspicion, is a manner in which a text may be read, "a hermeneutic not of irresponsible iconoclasm, nor of prideful play, but of charity and humility." It was the traditional or predominant way of reading the Bible for at least the first fifteen hundred years of Christian history. Both interpretive approaches combined are necessary for a complete knowledge of an object.

Hans-Georg Gadamer, in his 1960 magnum opus Truth and Method (Wahrheit und Methode), offers perhaps the most systematic survey of hermeneutics in the 20th century, its title referring to his dialogue between claims of "truth" on the one hand and processes of "method" on the other—in brief, the hermeneutics of faith versus the hermeneutics of suspicion. Gadamer suggests that, ultimately, in our reading we must decide between one or the other.

According to Ruthellen Josselson, "(Paul) Ricœur distinguishes between two forms of hermeneutics: a hermeneutics of faith, which aims to restore meaning to a text, and a hermeneutics of suspicion, which attempts to decode meanings that are disguised." Rita Felski posits that Ricœur's hermeneutics of faith did not become fashionable because it appeared dismissive of the work of critique that defined an ascendant post-structuralism.

== Pope Benedict XVI's use of the term ==
During his October 14, 2008, address to the Synod of Bishops, Pope Benedict XVI cautioned,

[W]here the hermeneutics of faith…disappear, another type of hermeneutics will appear by necessity — a hermeneutics that is secularist, positivist, the key fundamental of which is the conviction that the divine does not appear in human history.

In the history of Christianity, it is Paul the Apostle whose relationship to biblical texts is most closely associated with the hermeneutics of faith.

== See also ==
- Hermeneutics of suspicion
