= Clingerman =

Clingerman is a German surname. Notable people with the surname include:

- Forrest Clingerman (1972–2024), American philosophy academic and author
- Mildred Clingerman (1918–1997), American science fiction author
