= Theological hermeneutics =

Field of theology

Theological hermeneutics is a field of theology, broadly referring to the application of hermeneutics, the theory and methodology of interpretation, to theological texts with theological means, particularly to scripture.

== Christian ==
Christian theological hermeneutics dates from Philo and Origen, and Reformers like Martin Luther using the distinction between the Law and the Gospel and John Calvin using the ideal of brevitas et facilitas It often has a strong connection to biblical hermeneutics, studying the principles of interpretation concerning the books of the Bible as a basis for theologizing. Furthermore, it is part of the broader field of hermeneutics which involves the study of principles for the text and includes all forms of communication: verbal and nonverbal.

Theological hermeneutics in the mainstream Protestant tradition considers Christian biblical hermeneutics in the tradition of explication of the text, or exegesis, to deal with various principles that can be applied to the study of Scripture. If the canon of Scripture is considered as an organic whole, rather than an accumulation of disparate individual texts written and edited in the course of history, then any interpretation that contradicts any other part of scripture is not considered to be sound. Biblical hermeneutics is often differentiated from theological hermeneutics, by drawing on different interpretative formulae. For instance, some have underscored Dispensational, Covenantal, and New Covenantal models of theological hermeneutics. Others have challenged these approaches and advocated for Postcolonial and Feminist approaches of theological hermeneutics.

== Jewish ==
=== Traditional ===
Talmudical Hermeneutics (Hebrew: approximately, מידות שהתורה נדרשת בהן) is the science which defines the rules and methods for the investigation and exact determination of the meaning of the Scriptures, both legal and historical. Since the Halakah, however, is regarded simply as an exposition and explanation of the Torah, Talmud hermeneutics includes also the rules by which the requirements of the oral law are derived from and established by the written law.

=== Biblical source criticism ===
Among non-Orthodox Jews, there is growing interest in employing biblical source criticism, such as the Documentary hypothesis and the Supplementary hypothesis, for constructing modern Jewish theology, including the following objectives:

- Reconciling modern morals with biblical passages that condone morally problematic acts, such as genocide and other collective punishment
- Rejecting or accepting folkways, social norms, and linguistic trends, picking and choosing as more fully informed Jews
- Learning lessons in spite of biblical underrepresentation, or outright exclusion, of particular modern phenomena

To at least some extent, this is an application of Talmudical hermeneutics to traditional source criticism of the competing Torah schools: Priestly, Deuteronomic, and one, two, or more that are non-Priestly and non-Deuteronomic.

== Islamic ==
Qur'anic hermeneutics is the study of theories of the interpretation and understanding of the Qur'an, the Muslim holy book. Throughout religious history, Qur'anic scholars have sought to mine the wealth of its meanings by developing a variety of different systems of hermeneutics.

== See also ==
- Brevitas et facilitas
