= Brevitas et facilitas =

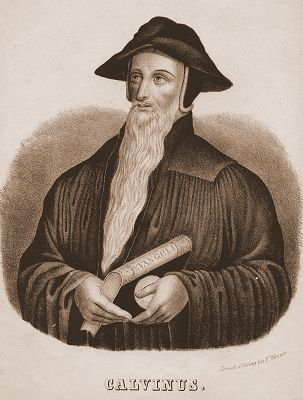
John Calvin

Brevitas et Facilitas means "brevity and simplicity" in English, the hermeneutical method of John Calvin. Especially he used this method in the dedication in the Commentary on Romans. Calvin presented his own distinctive method of the hermeneutics of Scripture in his Commentary on the Epistle of Paul, the Apostle, to the Romans. It is called the ideal of brevitas et facilitas. Calvin was not satisfied with both Malanchthon's loci method and Bucer's prolixity commentary. He took a via media approach. Calvin's method was influenced by the rhetoric of Aristotle, Cicero, Quintilian and Chrysostom. Calvin, however, confirmed that his own principle came from Scripture itself. Calvin showed that the clarity of Scripture was related to the ideal of brevitas et facilitas. According to John Bolt this means the brevitas et dilucidatio of Thomas Aquinas.

== Method as brevitas et facilitas ==
According to Michael Mewborn, Calvin did have a basic approach to Scripture which is often described as brevitas et facilitas (i.e. in derivative form-brevitas-to be brief and relevant and facilitas-to be simple or easily understood), brevitas for short. Brevitas is an assent to clear and concise interpretation. Even though the Latin terminology may paint Calvin's approach as irrelevant or archaic, the heart of this method is the basis of evangelical interpretation today. Richard Gamble writes of brevitas, “[it] may be understood as an attempt to communicate the message of the biblical author in as concise, clear, and accurate a manner as possible….” That brevitas et facilitas is a good summary of Calvin's exegetical methodology is hardly disputed; Battles, Kraus, Higman, Steinmetz, Girardin, Ganoczy/Scheld, and Parker among others have written recently about it.” Brevitas describes Calvin’s prevailing disposition toward interpretation. Calvin used this Method in his Commentaries. Richard Muller rightly notes that brevitas tended to describe more Calvin’s commentaries than his sermons. This point is well taken and suggests even more convincingly that brevitas characterizes Calvin’s approach to exegesis as he discerns biblical meaning in his study, apart from oratorical influence. Calvin was more apt to say less when writing than when speaking. Muller writes, “...whereas the commentaries held to the model of brevitas, the sermons tended toward a more amplificatory model of oratory, often reaching three or four times the length of the comment on the same text. But less we assume that Calvin victimized the text or at least his interpretations by verbalizing in excess of textual warrant or study, Muller notes that during oratory he was, “drawing on more collateral texts for the sake of broader hortatory, topical, and polemical development." It is a lesson to the exegete that the Holy Spirit does not dispense textual understanding only in our study rooms, but that he gives us textual understanding, even when we are without material aid.

== Source and mention of brevitas et facilitas ==
For Calvin Scripture was not complicated, but simple. Scripture was simply the eloquent speech of the Holy Spirit for his simple people. For Calvin the simplicity of Scripture was immediately connected with his hermeneutical method. This supplied Calvin with the foundation for the principles of brevitas et facilitas as his hermeneutical ideal. Calvin believed that Moses, Isaiah, Jeremiah, and Ezekiel employed a simple and easy style in order for ordinary people to understand God's Word more easily. This made him believe that the style of Scripture had its orientation in brevitas et facilitas. Consequently, Calvin, influenced by rhetoricians like Cicero and Quintilian in his ideal of brevitas et facilitas, confirmed that the authors of Scripture demonstrated this ideal. Calvin made this ideal a part of his own hermeneutical method.

In the dedication in the Commentary on Romans published in 1540 to Simon Grynaeus his friend and Hebrew teacher, John Calvin says

"we both thought that the chief excellency of an expounder consists in lucid brevity. And, indeed, since it is almost his only work to lay open the mind of the writer whom he undertakes to explain, the degree in which he leads away his readers from it, in that degree he goes astray from his purpose, and in a manner wanders from his own boundaries. Hence we expressed a hope, that from the number of those who strive at this day to advance the interest of theology by this kind of labour, some one would be found, who would study plainness, and endeavour to avoid the evil of tiring his readers with prolixity. I know at the same time that this view is not taken by all, and that those who judge otherwise have their reasons; but still I cannot be drawn away from the love of what is compendious. But as there is such a variety, found in the minds of men, that different things please different persons, let every one in this case follow his own judgment, provided that no one attempts to force others to adopt his own rules. Thus it will be, that we who approve of brevity, will not reject nor despise the labours of those who are more copious and diffused in their explanations of Scripture, and that they also in their turn will bear with us, though they may think us too compressed and concise.

"Sentiebat enim uterque nostrum praecipuam interpretis virtutem in perspicua brevitate esse positam. Et sane, quum hoc sit prope unicum illius officium mentem scriptoris quem explicandum sumpsit patefacere, quantum ab ea lecturos abducit, tantundem a scopo suo aberrat, vel certe a suis finibus quodammodo evagatur…unum aliquem exstare qui et facilitati studeret, et simul daret operam ne prolixis commentariis studiosos ultra modum detineret…ego tamen dimoveri non possum ab amore comendii".

== See also ==
- Theological hermeneutics
- Richard C. Gamble
- John Calvin
