= Emilio Betti =

Italian jurist

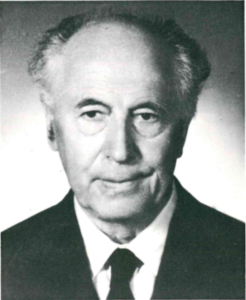
Emilio Betti

Emilio Betti (20 August 1890, Camerino – 11 August 1968, Camorciano di Camerino) was an Italian jurist, Roman Law scholar, philosopher and theologian. He is best known for his contributions to hermeneutics, part of a broad interest in interpretation. As a legal theorist, Betti is close to interpretivism.

Betti was one of the members of the drafting commission for the Italian civil code of 1942.

Betti's intellectual support of fascism between the end of World War I and the beginning of the 1920s led him to be arrested in 1944, in Camerino. Betti remained in prison for about a month, as decided by the Comitato di Liberazione Nazionale. In August 1945, Betti was presented to the court and absolved of every accusation.

Betti is perhaps best known for his work in hermeneutics. He took issue with the hermeneutic views of Hans Georg Gadamer and argued that interpreters should attempt to reconstruct the author's intentions. His work influenced the work of E. D. Hirsch, the chief English-language spokesman for authorial intention. However, his influence in English has been limited by the lack of translations of his hermeneutic work.

== Major works ==
Betti was a prolific writer. This is just a small part of his works:

- Sulla opposizione dell'exceptio sull'actio e sulla concorrenza tra loro (1913).
- La vendicatio romana primitiva e il suo svolgimento storico nel diritto privato e nel processo (1915).
- L'antitesi storica tra iudicare (pronuntiatio) e damnare (condemnatio) nello svolgimento del processo romano (1915).
- Studii sulla litis aestimatio del processo civile romano: I Pavia (1915), III (Camerino, 1919).
- Sul valore dogmatico della categoria contahere in giuristi proculiani e sabiniani (1916).
- La restaurazione sullana e il suo esito (Contributo allo studio della crisi della costituzione repubblicana in Roma) (1916).
- La struttura dell'obbligazione romana e il problema della sua genesi (1919).
- Il concetto della obbligazione costruito dal punto di vista dell'azione (1920).
- Trattato dei limiti soggettivi della cosa giudicata in diritto romano (1922).
- La tradizione nel diritto romano classico e giustinianeo (1924–25).
- Esercitazioni romanistiche su casi pratici: I, anormalità del negozio giuridico (1930).
- Diritto romano: parte generale (1935).
- Teoria generale del negozio giuridico (1943).
- Teoria generale delle obbligazioni (1953–1955).
- Teoria generale della interpretazione (1955–1960).
- Teoria delle obbligazioni in diritto romano (1956).
- Attualità di una teoria generale dell'interpretazione (1967).

== References and further reading ==
- Ciocchetti, Mario (1998). Emilio Betti, Giureconsulto e umanista. Belforte del Chienti.
- Pressler, Charles and Dasilva Fabio (1996). Sociology and Interpretation From Weber to Habemas. State University of New York Press.
