= Metaphor in philosophy =

Metaphor, the description of one thing as something else, has become of interest in recent decades to both analytic philosophy and continental philosophy, but for different reasons.

== Metaphor in analytic philosophy ==
In the Anglo-American tradition of analytic philosophy (in particular, in the philosophy of language), metaphor has attracted interest because it does not conform to accepted truth-conditional semantics, the conditions which determine whether or not a statement is true. Taken literally, the statement "Juliet is the sun" (from Romeo and Juliet) is false, if not nonsensical, yet, taken metaphorically, it is meaningful and may be true, but in a sense which is far from clear. The comparison theory of metaphor asserts that one can express the truth value of a metaphor by listing all the respects in which the two terms are alike or similar; for example: Juliet is like the sun because she shares with it qualities such as radiance, brilliance, the fact that she makes the day and that she gets up every morning. However, this results in re-casting metaphor as simile. Because it can only explain the truth of metaphor by in effect losing metaphor, the comparison theory is rarely defended.

In contrast, two leading theorists emphasize the fact that truth conditions cannot be specified for a metaphor. Max Black maintains that metaphors are too open-ended to be able to function as referring expressions, and so cannot be expressions which have truth conditions (Black 1962). If metaphors are used in contexts where precise terminology is expected (for example, in a scientific theory), then their role, Black argues, is purely heuristic, that is, they are means to an end or ways of assisting understanding, rather than being terms which can be tested for truth or falsity (Black 1962, p. 37). Donald Davidson also thinks it a mistake to look for the truth conditions of a metaphor, since, in his words, "much of what we are caused to notice [in a metaphor] is not propositional in character", that is to say, metaphor is a prompt to thought which cannot be reduced to or contained by a series of truth conditions (Davidson 1984, p. 263). What metaphor does, Davidson maintains, is make us see one thing as something else by "making [a] literal statement that inspires or prompts the insight" (Davidson 1984, p. 263). Seeing one thing as something else is not the recognition of some truth or fact, and so "the attempt to give literal expression to the content of the metaphor is simply misguided" (Davidson 1984, p. 263).

Max Black develops the idea that metaphor actually creates insight or new meaning (Black 1979). His interactionist theory asserts that at the heart of a metaphor is the interaction between its two subject terms, where the interaction provides the condition for a meaning which neither of the subject terms possesses independently of the metaphorical context. The primary subject in a metaphor, he claims, is coloured by a set of "associated implications" normally predicated of the secondary subject (Black 1979, p. 28). From the number of possible meanings which could result, the primary subject sieves the qualities predicable of the secondary subject, letting through only those that fit. The interaction, as a process, brings into being what Black terms an "implication-complex", a system of associated implications shared by the linguistic community as well as an impulse of free meaning, free in that it is meaning which was unavailable prior to the metaphor's introduction (Black 1979, p. 28).

In a different, naturalist, approach, some English-speaking philosophers close to cognitive science, such as Lakoff, have made metaphor the central aspect of human rationality.

== Metaphor in continental philosophy ==
Whereas analytic philosophy examines metaphor within the philosophy of language, continental philosophy assigns much wider significance to metaphor. This is because the climate within continental thought has been more favourable to the propagation of new branches of enquiry from nineteenth century German philosophy. Although Kant and Hegel sit quite happily on both analytic and continental curricula, it is only the latter which has seriously addressed the need to rethink how the world appears to us and how it is made manifest to us in the light of their metaphysics. Metaphor has proven to be extremely important for this rethinking because it is the process of conceptual borrowing or reassignment which revises our perception of the world.

The major shift which occurs in Kantian continental philosophy, according to Cazeaux, is the departure 'from dualistic thought, i.e. thinking which remains within the boundaries created by oppositions, such as mind—body and subjective—objective' (Cazeaux 2007, p. 4). The turn away from dualistic thought is made by Kant on account of his representing experience as the subjective determination of an objective world, thereby placing in a relationship terms which normally stand as opposites in a dualism. As a result of this shift, without conventional dualisms to fall back upon, the process of conceptual borrowing and cross-referral presented by metaphor becomes central as the means by which the textures and complexities of experience can be articulated. Theses to this effect, but with significant differences, can be found in Kierkegaard, Nietzsche, Heidegger, Merleau-Ponty, Bachelard, Paul Ricoeur, and Derrida.

To give two examples, according to Nietzsche, we are in metaphor or we are metaphor: our being is not derived from a Platonic, eternal essence or from a Cartesian thinking substance but (in as much as there is a way of being we can call ours) is emergent from tensional interactions between competing drives or perspectives (Nietzsche 2000). We customarily hold truth to be a relation of correspondence between knowledge and reality but, Nietzsche declares, it is in fact ‘a movable host of metaphors, metonymies, and anthropomorphisms’ due to the fundamentally metaphorical nature of concept-formation, a series of creative leaps from nerve stimulus to retinal image (first metaphor) to sound as signifier (second metaphor) (Nietzsche 2000, p. 55). Our categories, and the judgments we form with them, can never correspond to things in themselves because they are formed through a series of transformations which ensures that ‘there is no causality, no correctness, and no expression’ connecting the first stage (the stimulus) with the last (the concept) (Nietzsche 2000, p. 58).

For Ricoeur, metaphor is also ‘living’ – hence the title of his book, La Métaphore vive (Ricoeur 1975) (translated into English as The Rule of Metaphor (Ricoeur 1977)) – but in a different sense from Nietzsche. Metaphor is living, Ricoeur claims, in that it is the principle which revives our perception of the world and through which we become aware of our creative capacity for seeing the world anew. This process, he thinks, is both paradoxical and Kantian in nature: paradoxical in that the creative combination of terms in a metaphor nevertheless produces meaning which has the character of a discovery (how can something be both a creation and a discovery?), and Kantian because the paradox mirrors Kant's theory of experience in which the subjective application of concepts nevertheless yields perception of an objective world. The tension between the subjective, creative and the objective, discovery aspects of a metaphor, Ricoeur argues, proceeds ‘from the very structures of the mind, which it is the task of [Kant’s] transcendental philosophy to articulate’ (Ricoeur 1977, p. 300). Unfortunately, the part of Kant's philosophy which Ricoeur appeals to is highly problematic: the schema or schematism, the operation which Kant dismisses as ‘an art concealed in the depths of the human soul' (Kant 1929, p. 183, A141, B180-81). Ricoeur’s Kantianism is considered at length by Cazeaux (Cazeaux 2007) and Stellardi (Stellardi 2000), with the former providing an account of how the schematism might afford a coherent explanation of metaphor.

Another reason for the attention paid by continental philosophy to metaphor is the questioning of boundaries – between subject areas and between the wider concepts of ethics, epistemology and aesthetics – which has occurred within postmodernism. Principal concerns in these debates are the status of knowledge and the way in which the concepts of truth and objectivity are understood. Philosophy has been under attack on this score with its history of ‘universal truths’, e.g. Descartes’s cogito, Kant’s table of categories, and Hegel’s Absolute Consciousness. The main arguments against this universalism invoke metaphor on two related accounts: (1) the fact that key epistemological concepts have metaphors at their root, for example, “mirroring”, “correspondence”, “sense data”, is taken as evidence of the contingent, communal, subjective basis of knowledge, and (2) because metaphor (as a form of dislocated or dislocating predication) works by testing the appropriate with the inappropriate, it is seen as a means of challenging the boundaries whereby one subject defines itself in relation to another.
