= Hermeneutics of suspicion =

Literary interpretation style that uses skepticism to expose hidden meaning

The hermeneutics of suspicion is a style of literary interpretation in which texts are read with skepticism in order to expose their purported repressed or hidden meanings.

This mode of interpretation was conceptualized by Paul Ricœur, inspired by the works of what he called the three "masters of suspicion" (French: maîtres du soupçon): Karl Marx, Sigmund Freud, and Friedrich Nietzsche who, he believed, shared a similar view of consciousness as false. Ricœur's term "school of suspicion" (French: école du soupçon) refers to his association of his theory with the writings of the three, who themselves never used this term, This school is defined by a belief that the straightforward appearances of texts are deceptive or self-deceptive and that explicit content hides deeper meanings or implications.

== Overview ==
Hans-Georg Gadamer, in his 1960 work Truth and Method (German: Wahrheit und Methode), offers perhaps the most systematic survey of hermeneutics in the 20th century. The title of the work indicates his dialogue between claims of "truth" on the one hand and the processes of "method" on the other—in brief, the hermeneutics of faith and the hermeneutics of suspicion. Gadamer suggests that, ultimately, one must decide between one and the other when reading.

Ruthellen Josselson similarly writes, "Ricoeur distinguishes between two forms of hermeneutics: a hermeneutics of faith which aims to restore meaning to a text and a hermeneutics of suspicion which attempts to decode meanings that are disguised."

According to literary theorist Rita Felski, hermeneutics of suspicion is "a distinctively modern style of interpretation that circumvents obvious or self-evident meanings in order to draw out less visible and less flattering truths." Felski further writes:

[Marx, Freud, and Nietzsche] share a commitment to unmasking 'the lies and illusions of consciousness'; they are the architects of a distinctively modern style of interpretation that circumvents obvious or self-evident meanings in order to draw out less visible and less flattering truths… Ricoeur's term has sustained an energetic after-life within religious studies, as well as in philosophy, intellectual history, and related fields.

Felski also notes that the "'hermeneutics of suspicion' is the name usually bestowed on [a] technique of reading texts against the grain and between the lines, of cataloging their omissions and laying bare their contradictions, of rubbing in what they fail to know and cannot represent." In that sense, it can be seen as being related to ideology critique. Felski has built on Ricœur's theory in outlining her influential theory of postcritique.

== See also ==
- Critical theory
- Michel Foucault
- Freudo-Marxism
- Sheldon Pollock
- Post-structuralism
- School of resentment
- Hermeneutics of faith

== Sources ==
- Dole, Andrew (2018). Reframing the Masters of Suspicion.
- Felski, Rita (2011a). "Critique and the Hermeneutics of Suspicion". M/C Journal. 15 (1).
- Felski, Rita (2011b). "Suspicious Minds". Poetics Today. 32 (2): 215–234.
- Felski, Rita (2011c). "Context Stinks!". New Literary History. 2 (4): 573–591.
- Gadamer, Hans-Georg (1960). Wahrheit und Methode.
- Giusti, Francesco (September 25, 2019). "Passionate Affinities: A Conversation with Rita Felski". Los Angeles Review of Books.
- Jasper, David (2004). A Short Introduction to Hermeneutics.
- Josselson, Ruthellen (2004). "The Hermeneutics of Faith and the Hermeneutics of Suspicion". Narrative Inquiry. 14 (1): 1–28.
- Lindop, Samantha Jane (2011). The Homme Fatal and the Subversion of Suspicion in Mr Brooks and The Killer Inside Me.
- Ricoeur, Paul (1965). De l'interprétation: essai sur Freud.
- Ricoeur, Paul (1969). Le Conflit des interprétations: Essais d'herméneutique.
- Ricoeur, Paul (1970). Freud and Philosophy: An Essay on Interpretation. Denis Savage (transl.).
- Robinson, G. D. (September 27, 1995). "Paul Ricoeur and the Hermeneutics of Suspicion: A Brief Overview and Critique". Premise. 2 (8): 12.
- Scott-Baumann, Alison (2009). Ricoeur and the Hermeneutics of Suspicion.
