= Richard C. Gamble =

American reformed theologian and professor

- Born: January 12, 1955 (age 71); Pittsburgh, Pennsylvania, U.S.
- Education: Westminster College; Pittsburgh Theological Seminary; University of Basel
- Occupations: Theologian, professor
- Organizations: Orthodox Presbyterian Church

Richard C. Gamble (born January 12, 1955) is an American Reformed theologian, pastor, and professor of systematic theology. He is known for his scholarship on John Calvin and for authoring the three-volume systematic theology The Whole Counsel of God. Gamble has held faculty positions at Westminster Theological Seminary, Calvin Theological Seminary, Reformed Theological Seminary, and Reformed Presbyterian Theological Seminary. He is an ordained minister in the Orthodox Presbyterian Church.

== Early life and education ==
Gamble received his B.A. from Westminster College; his M.A. from Pittsburgh Theological Seminary; and his Ph.D. from the Universität Basel, where he studied Reformation theology.

== Academic career ==
Gamble began teaching church history at the Freie Evangelisch-Theologische Akademie (now STH Basel) from 1979 to 1981. He then served as Associate Professor of Church History at Westminster Theological Seminary from 1981 to 1987.

In 1987, he joined Calvin Theological Seminary as Professor of Historical Theology and became Director of the Henry Meeter Center for Calvin Studies. He remained there until 1997. From 1997 to 2005, he taught at Reformed Theological Seminary in Orlando. He later joined the faculty of Reformed Presbyterian Theological Seminary in Pittsburgh as Professor of Systematic Theology.

== Ministry ==
Gamble is an ordained minister in the Orthodox Presbyterian Church (OPC).

== Scholarship ==
Gamble is known for his work on John Calvin and Reformed hermeneutics. His scholarship has appeared in journals, edited collections, and monographs. His most substantial work is the three-volume The Whole Counsel of God, published by P&R Publishing between 2009 and 2022.

He has also contributed lectures and interviews to Reformed Forum and participated in theological conferences focused on Reformation studies.

== Teaching and theological approach ==
Gamble teaches systematic theology, historical theology, Reformed confessions, Calvin's theology, and hermeneutics. He emphasizes the relationship between biblical exegesis and doctrinal formulation, describing theology as “holy ground.”

== Political activity ==
Early in his career, Gamble served as Ward Commissioner for Abington Township near Philadelphia from 1985-1987. He also was executive director of the Philadelphia branch of the Christian Action Council, an anti-abortion organization, in the mid-1980s.

== Works ==
=== Books ===
- Gamble, Richard C. (2009). The Whole Counsel of God, Volume 1: God’s Mighty Acts in the Old Testament. Phillipsburg, NJ: P&R Publishing. ISBN 9781596381070.
- Gamble, Richard C. (2017). The Whole Counsel of God, Volume 2: The Full Revelation of God. Phillipsburg, NJ: P&R Publishing. ISBN 9781596381919.
- Gamble, Richard C. (2022). The Whole Counsel of God, Volume 3: God’s People in the Church and World. Phillipsburg, NJ: P&R Publishing. ISBN 9781629950143.

=== Edited volumes ===
- Gamble, Richard C., ed. (1992). Articles on Calvin and Calvinism: A Fourteen-Volume Anthology of Scholarly Articles. Garland Publishing.

=== Selected journal articles ===
- Gamble, Richard C. (1993). "Calvin and Exegetical Tradition". Calvin Theological Journal.
- Gamble, Richard C. (1985). "The Relationship of Calvin's Exegesis to His Theology". Westminster Theological Journal.

== See also ==
- Brevitas et facilitas
