= Brian Treanor =

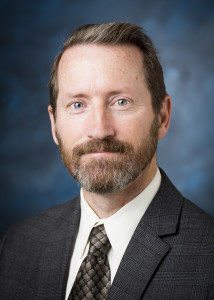
Brian Treanor

Brian Treanor is the current Casassa Chair in Social Values, Professor of Philosophy in the Bellarmine College of Liberal Arts and the academic director of the Academy of Catholic Thought & Imagination at Loyola Marymount University. He received his Ph.D. from Boston College where he studied with Richard Kearney and Jacques Taminiaux.

== Early life ==
Brian Treanor was born in California. He completed his undergraduate degree in political science at University of California, Los Angeles and attended both California State University, Long Beach and Boston College for his graduate work.

== Research ==
Treanor's research is in the area of philosophical hermeneutics, with significant focus on environmental philosophy, philosophy of religion, and ethics. He is the author or editor of six books:

- Carnal Hermeneutics, co-edited with Richard Kearney (New York: Fordham University Press, 2015, ISBN 9780823265893)
- Being in Creation: Human Responsibility in an Endangered World, co-edited with Bruce Benson and Norman Wirzba (New York: Fordham University Press, 2015, ISBN 978-0-8232-6502-2)
- Emplotting Virtue: A Narrative Approach to Environmental Virtue Ethics (Albany, NY: SUNY Press, 2014, ISBN 978-1438451176)
- Interpreting Nature: The Emerging Field of Environmental Hermeneutics, co-edited with Forrest Clingerman, Martin Drenthen, and David Utsler (New York: Fordham University Press, 2013, ISBN 978-0823254255)
- A Passion for the Possible: Thinking with Paul Ricoeur, co-edited with Henry Isaac Venema (New York: Fordham University Press, 2010, ISBN 978-0823232925)
- Aspects of Alterity: Levinas, Marcel and the Contemporary Debate (New York: Fordham University Press, 2006, ISBN 978-0823226849)

He has also written numerous article related to his field.

== Teaching and administrative work ==
Treanor is an advocate for liberal arts education. He has worked regularly in LMU's core curriculum, including founding a Great Books Learning Community. He was the founding director of the Environmental Studies program, and the founding director of the Academy of Catholic Thought and Imagination.

== Awards ==
Treanor has been honored by the Associated Students of LMU as Teacher of the Year twice, and in 2011, was given the President's Fritz B. Burns Teaching Award, the university's highest honor.
