= Nordic Network for Interdisciplinary Environmental Studies =

Swedish-based research network

The Nordic Network for Interdisciplinary Environmental Studies (NIES) is a research network for environmental studies based primarily in the humanities. By organizing regular conferences, symposia and workshops, NIES aims to create opportunities for researchers in the Nordic countries who address environmental questions to exchange ideas and develop their work in various interdisciplinary contexts. Fields represented by members of the network include Ecocriticism, Environmental history, Environmental philosophy, Science and Technology Studies, Art history, Media studies, Ecological economics, Human Geography, Cultural studies, Anthropology, Archeology, Sustainability studies, Education for Sustainability and Landscape studies.

NIES is responsible for organizing and editing the research series Studies in the Environmental Humanities (SEH) published by Rodopi.

== History ==
Formed in 2007, NIES was originally a cooperation among small academic groups in Sweden, Norway and Denmark. Today, it includes more than 100 researchers from all the Nordic countries. The network actively sponsors a wide range of educational initiatives, research projects and public outreach activities and is a key partner in pan-European and other international initiatives to build capacity and foster theoretical advancement in the Environmental Humanities. Since January 2011, the network's primary anchoring institution is Mid Sweden University in Sundsvall, Sweden. National anchoring institutions include University of Turku, University of Oslo, University of Iceland, Uppsala University and University of Southern Denmark. The network's current phase of operations (2011–2015) is supported by NordForsk.
