= Paul Ricœur =

French philosopher (1913–2005)

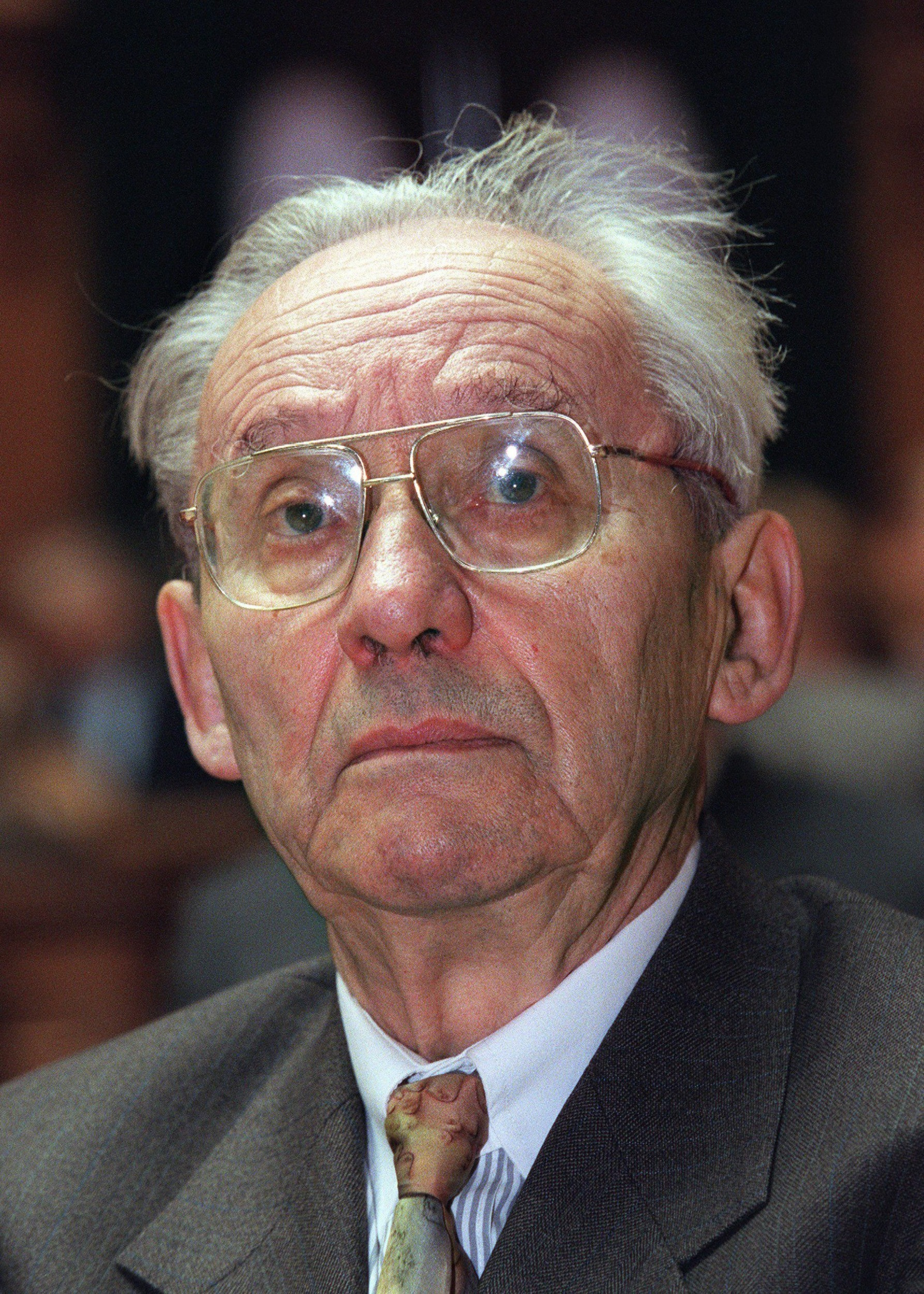
- Ricœur, c. 1999
- Born: Jean Paul Gustave Ricœur; 27 February 1913; Valence, Drôme, France
- Died: 20 May 2005 (aged 92); Châtenay-Malabry, Hauts-de-Seine, France
- Other name: "Péric"
- Political party: SFIO
- Spouse: Simone Lejas (m. 1935; died 1998)
- Children: 5

Education
- Education: University of Rennes (B.A., 1932); University of Paris (M.A., 1934; Ph.D, 1950)
- Academic advisors: Roland Dalbiez; Gabriel Marcel

Philosophical work
- Era: 20th-century philosophy
- Region: Western philosophy
- School: Continental philosophy Hermeneutic phenomenology Psychoanalysis; Christian theology Christian existentialism
- Institutions: University of Strasbourg; University of Paris; University of Paris X: Nanterre; Université catholique de Louvain; University of Chicago
- Doctoral students: Cornelius Castoriadis; Mark Johnson; Richard Kearney; François Laruelle; Jean-Luc Nancy
- Main interests: Phenomenology; Hermeneutics; Philosophy of action Moral philosophy Political philosophy Philosophy of language Personal identity Narrative identity Historiography; Literary criticism Ancient philosophy
- Notable ideas: Psychoanalysis as a hermeneutics of the Subject, theory of metaphor, metaphors as having "split references" (one side referring to something not antecedently accessible to language), (Note: Ricœur borrowed the term "split reference" from Roman Jakobson.) criticism of structuralism, productive imagination, social imaginary, retroactive reference, the "school of suspicion" in philosophy

Jean Paul Gustave Ricœur (/rɪˈkɜːr/; French: [ʁikœʁ]; 27 February 1913 – 20 May 2005) was a French philosopher best known for combining phenomenological description with hermeneutics. As such, his thought is within the same tradition as other major hermeneutic phenomenologists, such as Martin Heidegger, Hans-Georg Gadamer, and Gabriel Marcel. In 2000, he was awarded the Kyoto Prize in Arts and Philosophy for having "revolutionized the methods of hermeneutic phenomenology, expanding the study of textual interpretation to include the broad yet concrete domains of mythology, biblical exegesis, psychoanalysis, theory of metaphor, and narrative theory."

== Life ==
=== 1913–1945: Birth to war years ===
Paul Ricœur was born in 1913 in Valence, Drôme, France, to Léon "Jules" Ricœur (23 December 1881 – 26 September 1915) and Florentine Favre (17 September 1878 – 3 October 1913), who were married on 30 December 1910 in Lyon. He came from a family of devout Huguenots (French Reformed Protestants), a religious minority in France.

Paul's father Jules, who served as a sergeant in the 75th Infantry Regiment of the French army during World War I, went missing in Perthes-lès-Hurlus near the beginning of the Second Battle of Champagne (25 September – 6 November 1915). On 26 September 1915, French military authorities declared that Jules had probably been killed in the battle. His body was not found until 1932, when a field was being ploughed, and the body was identified by its tags. Some writers have stated that before World War I began, Paul's father (Léon "Jules" Ricœur) was a professor of English at the Lycée Emile Loubet in Valence. However, it was a different person (Jules Paul Ricœur (1887–1918)) who held that position. Paul's father's death occurred when Paul was only two years old. Subsequently, Paul was raised in Rennes, France by his paternal grandparents Louis Ricœur (1856–1932) and his wife Marie Sarradet (1856–1928), and by his father's sister Juliette "Adèle" Ricœur (20 December 1892 – 1968), with a small stipend afforded to Paul as a war orphan.

Paul, whose penchant for study was fueled by his family's Protestant emphasis on Bible study, was bookish and intellectually precocious. He discovered philosophy while attending the Lycée de Rennes (now Lycée Émile-Zola de Rennes), where he studied under Roland Dalbiez (1893–1976), who was professor of philosophy at the lycée. Ricœur received his bachelor's degree in 1932 from the University of Rennes and began studying philosophy, and especially phenomenology, at the Sorbonne in 1933–34, where he was influenced by Gabriel Marcel. When Ricœur was in Paris, he attended the Friday gatherings held by this philosopher who introduced him to Edmund Husserl. During those "meetings" students, professors, intellectuals would gather for several hours of lively discussion. Among them there were: Merleau-Ponty, Emmanuel Levinas, Luigi Pareyson, Nikolai Berdyaev, Paul-Louis Landsberg, and Sartre. Ricœur also joined the Esprit magazine, which had been founded in 1932 by Emmanuel Mounier.

In 1934, he completed a DES thesis (diplôme d'études supérieures, roughly equivalent to an M.A.) titled Problème de Dieu chez Lachelier et Lagneau (The Problem of God in Lachelier and Lagneau), concerning some of the theological views of French philosophers Jules Lachelier (1832–1918) and Jules Lagneau (1851–1894). In 1935, Paul was awarded the second-highest agrégation mark in the nation for philosophy, presaging a bright future.

On 14 August 1935, in Rennes, Paul married Simone Lejas (23 October 1911 – 7 January 1998), with whom he had five children: Jean-Paul (born 15 January 1937), Marc (born 22 February 1938), Noëlle (born 30 November 1940), Olivier (10 July 1947 – 22 March 1986), and Étienne (born 1953). In 1936–37, he fulfilled his military service.

World War II interrupted Ricœur's career, and he was drafted to serve in the French army in 1939. His unit was captured during the German invasion of France in 1940 and he spent the next five years as a prisoner of war in Oflag II-D. His detention camp was filled with other intellectuals such as Mikel Dufrenne, who organized readings and classes sufficiently rigorous that the camp was accredited as a degree-granting institution by the Vichy government. During that time he read Karl Jaspers, who was to have a great influence on him. He also began a translation of Edmund Husserl's Ideas I.

=== 1946–2005: Strasbourg University to death ===
Ricœur taught at the University of Strasbourg between 1948 and 1956, the only French university with a Protestant faculty of theology. In 1950, he received his State doctorate from the Sorbonne by submitting (as is customary in France) two theses: a "minor" thesis translating Husserl's Ideas I into French for the first time, with commentary, and a "major" thesis that he published the same year as Philosophie de la Volonté I: Le Volontaire et l'Involontaire (Philosophy of the Will I: The Voluntary and the Involuntary). Ricœur soon acquired a reputation as an expert on phenomenology, then the ascendent philosophy in France.

In 1956, Ricœur took up a position at the Sorbonne as the Chair of General Philosophy. This appointment signaled Ricœur's emergence as one of France's most prominent philosophers. While at the Sorbonne, he wrote three works that cemented his reputation: Fallible Man and The Symbolism of Evil published in 1960, and Freud and Philosophy: An Essay on Interpretation published in 1965. Jacques Derrida was an assistant to Ricœur during that time (early 1960s).

From 1965 to 1970, Ricœur was an administrator at the newly founded University of Paris X: Nanterre in suburban Paris. (Note: During that time, Ricœur was Cornelius Castoriadis' long-distance doctoral advisor.) Nanterre was intended as an experiment in progressive education, and Ricœur hoped that he could create a university in accordance with his vision, free of the stifling atmosphere of the tradition-bound Sorbonne and its overcrowded classes. Nevertheless, Nanterre became a hotbed of protest during the student uprisings of May 1968 in France. Ricœur was derided as an "old clown" (vieux clown) and tool of the French government.

Disenchanted with French academic life, Ricœur taught briefly at the Université catholique de Louvain in Belgium, before taking a position at the Divinity School of the University of Chicago, where he taught from 1970 to 1985. He was elected a Foreign Honorary Member of the American Academy of Arts and Sciences in 1971. His study culminated in The Rule of Metaphor: Multi-Disciplinary Studies of the Creation of Meaning in Language published in 1975 and the three-volume Time and Narrative published in 1983, 1984, 1985 Ricœur gave the Gifford Lectures in 1985/86, published in 1990 as Oneself as Another. This work built on his discussion of narrative identity and his continuing interest in the self.

In 1985, he was awarded the Hegel Prize. Time and Narrative secured Ricœur's return to France in 1985 as a notable intellectual. His late work was characterised by a continuing cross-cutting of national intellectual traditions; for example, some of his latest writings engaged the thought of the American political philosopher John Rawls. In 1995 he received an honorary doctorate from the National University of Kyiv-Mohyla Academy.

In 1999, he was awarded the Balzan Prize for Philosophy, the citation being "[f]or his capacity in bringing together all the most important themes and indications of 20th-century philosophy, and re-elaborating them into an original synthesis which turns language – in particular, that which is poetic and metaphoric – into a chosen place revealing a reality that we cannot manipulate, but interpret in diverse ways, and yet all coherent. Through the use of metaphor, language draws upon that truth which makes of us that what we are, deep in the profundity of our own essence". That same year, he and his co-author André LaCocque (professor emeritus of Hebrew Bible at Chicago Theological Seminary) were awarded the Gordon J. Laing Award by the University of Chicago's Board of University Publications for their book Thinking Biblically: Exegetical and Hermeneutical Studies.

On 29 November 2004, he was awarded with the second John W. Kluge Prize for Lifetime Achievement in the Human Sciences (shared with Jaroslav Pelikan).

Ricœur died on 20 May 2005, aged 92, at his home in Châtenay-Malabry, France, of natural causes. French Prime Minister Jean-Pierre Raffarin declared that "the humanist European tradition is in mourning for one of its most talented exponents". Paul Ricœur was buried in the Châtenay-Malabry New Cemetery, Châtenay-Malabry, Department des Hauts-de-Seine, Île-de-France, France.

== Thought ==
=== Hermeneutic phenomenology ===
One of Ricœur's major contributions to the field of hermeneutics was the entwining of hermeneutical processes with phenomenology. In this union, Ricœur applies the hermeneutical task to more than just textual analysis, but also to how each self relates to anything that is outside of the self. For Ricœur, hermeneutics is understanding the link between the self and the symbol—neither things in themselves, but the dialectical engagement between the two. Moreover, Ricœur, on the goal of hermeneutics, puts emphasis upon self-understanding as the outcome of the hermeneutical process:

"In proposing to relate symbolic language to self-understanding, I think I fulfill the deepest wish of hermeneutics. The purpose of all interpretation is to conquer a remoteness, a distance between the past cultural epoch to which the text belongs and the interpreter himself. By overcoming this distance, by making himself contemporary with the text, the exegete can appropriate its meaning to himself: foreign, he makes it familiar, that is, he makes it his own. It is thus the growth of his own understanding of himself that he pursues through his understanding of others. Every hermeneutics is thus, explicitly or implicitly, self-understanding by means of understanding others."

Ricoeur maintains that the hermeneutical task is a coming together of the self and an other, in a meaningful way. This explication of self-meaning and other-meaning is principally bound up and manifested in existence itself. Thus, Ricoeur depicts philosophy as a hermeneutical activity seeking to uncover the meaning of existence through the interpretation of phenomena (which can only emerge as) embedded in the world of culture:

"This is why philosophy remains a hermeneutics, that is, a reading of the hidden meaning inside the text of the apparent meaning. It is the task of this hermeneutics to show that existence arrives at expression, at meaning, and at reflection only through the continual exegesis of all the significations that come to light in the world of culture. Existence becomes a self – human and adult – only by appropriating this meaning, which first resides "outside," in works, institutions, and cultural movements in which the life of the spirit is justified."

Furthermore, the process of hermeneutics, and extracting meaning, is a reflective task. The emphasis is not on the external meaning, but the meaning or insight of the self which is gained through encountering the external text—or other. The self-knowledge gained through the hermeneutical process is, thus, indirectly attained. This is in opposition to the Cartesian cogito, "which grasps itself directly in the experience of doubt," and is "a truth as vain as it is invincible." In point of fact, the difference Ricœur aims to distinguish is the means by which the self is discovered, which for him is only by means of interpreting the signified.

According to Ricœur, the aim of hermeneutics is to recover and to restore the meaning. The French philosopher chooses the model of the phenomenology of religion, in relation to psychoanalysis, stressing that it is characterized by a concern about the object. This object is the sacred, which is seen in relation to the profane.

Ricœur's hermeneutical work Freud and Philosophy contains the famous assertion that Karl Marx, Friedrich Nietzsche and Sigmund Freud are masters of the school of suspicion (maîtres du soupçon/école du soupçon). Ricœur's theory has been particularly influential to postcritique, a scholarly movement in literary criticism and cultural studies that seeks for new forms of reading and interpretation that go beyond the methods of critique, critical theory, and ideological criticism. The literary critic Rita Felski, for instance, argues that he is a crucial figure in the history of this tradition. She claims that his influential analysis of the "hermeneutics of suspicion" "invites us to think about how we read and to what end."

=== Philosophy of language ===
In The Rule of Metaphor and in Time and Narrative, vol. 1, Ricœur argues that there exists a linguistic productive imagination that generates/regenerates meaning through the power of metaphoricity by way of stating things in novel ways and, as a consequence, he sees language as containing within itself resources that allow it to be used creatively.

== Works ==
- Gabriel Marcel et Karl Jaspers. Philosophie du mystère et philosophie du paradoxe [Gabriel Marcel & Karl Jaspers: Philosophy of mystery & Philosophy of paradox] (in French), Paris: Temps Present, 1947.
- History and Truth, translated by Charles A. Kelbley, Evanston, Ill: Northwestern University Press, 1965 [1955].
- Freedom and Nature: The Voluntary and the Involuntary, trans. Erazim Kohak. Evanston: Northwestern University Press, 1966 (1950).
- Husserl: An Analysis of His Phenomenology. Northwestern University Studies in Phenomenology and Existential Philosophy. Evanston: Northwestern University Press, 1967
- The Symbolism of Evil, trans. Emerson Buchanan. New York: Harper and Row, 1967 (1960).
- Entretiens sur l'Art et la Psychanalyse (sous la direction de Andre Berge, Anne Clancier, Paul Ricoeur et Lothair Rubinstein, Paris, La Haye: Mouton, 1968 (1964).
- Le Conflit des interprétations. Essais d'herméneutique I, Le Seuil, 1969.
- Freud and Philosophy: An Essay on Interpretation, trans. Denis Savage. New Haven: Yale University Press, 1970 (1965).
- The Conflict of Interpretations: Essays in Hermeneutics, ed. Don Ihde, trans. Willis Domingo et al. Evanston: Northwestern University Press, 1974 (1969).
- Political and Social Essays, ed. David Stewart and Joseph Bien, trans. Donald Stewart et al. Athens: Ohio University Press, 1974.
- The Rule of Metaphor: Multi-Disciplinary Studies of the Creation of Meaning in Language, trans. Robert Czerny with Kathleen McLaughlin and John Costello, S. J., London: Routledge and Kegan Paul 1978 (1975).
- Interpretation Theory: Discourse and the Surplus of Meaning. Fort Worth: Texas Christian Press, 1976.
- The Philosophy of Paul Ricœur: An Anthology of his Work, ed. Charles E. Reagan and David Stewart. Boston: Beacon Press, 1978.
- Essays on Biblical Interpretation (Philadelphia: Fortress Press, 1980)
- Hermeneutics and the Human Sciences: Essays on Language, Action and Interpretation, ed., trans. John B. Thompson. Cambridge: Cambridge University Press, 1981.
- Time and Narrative (Temps et Récit), 3 vols. trans. Kathleen McLaughlin and David Pellauer. Chicago: University of Chicago Press, 1984, 1985, 1988 (1983, 1984, 1985).
- Lectures on Ideology and Utopia, ed., trans. George H. Taylor. New York: Columbia University Press, 1985.
- Du texte à l'action. Essais d'herméneutique II, Le Seuil, 1986.
- From Text to Action: Essays in Hermeneutics II, trans. Kathleen Blamey and John B. Thompson. Evanston: Northwestern University Press, 1991 (1986).
- À l'école de la phenomenologie. Paris: J. Vrin, 1986.
- Le mal: Un défi à la philosophie et à la théologie. Geneva: Labor et Fides, 1986.
- Fallible Man, trans. Charles A. Kelbley, with an introduction by Walter J. Lowe, New York: Fordham University Press, 1986 (1960).
- A Ricœur Reader: Reflection and Imagination, ed. Mario J. Valdes. Toronto: University of Toronto Press, 1991.
- Lectures I: Autour du politique. Paris: Seuil, 1991.
- Lectures II: La Contrée des philosophes. Paris: Seuil, 1992.
- Oneself as Another (Soi-même comme un autre), trans. Kathleen Blamey. Chicago: University of Chicago Press, 1992 (1990).
- Lectures III: Aux frontières de la philosophie. Paris: Seuil, 1994.
- Réflexion faite. Autobiographie intellectuelle. Esprit, 1995.
- The Philosophy of Paul Ricœur, ed. Lewis E. Hahn (The Library of Living Philosophers 22) (Chicago; La Salle: Open Court, 1995).
- The Just, trans. David Pellauer. Chicago: University of Chicago Press, 2000 (1995).
- Critique and Conviction, trans. Kathleen Blamey. New York: Columbia University Press, 1998 (1995).
- Thinking Biblically, (with André LaCocque). University of Chicago Press, 1998.
- La mémoire, l'histoire, l'oubli. Paris: Seuil, 2000.
- Le Juste II. Paris: Esprit, 2001.
- Memory, History, Forgetting, trans. by Kathleen Blamey and David Pellauer. University of Chicago Press, 2004.
- The Course of Recognition, trans. David Pellauer. Harvard University Press, 2005.
- Reflections on the Just, trans. David Pellauer. University of Chicago Press, 2007.
- Living Up to Death, trans. David Pellauer. University of Chicago Press, 2009.

== See also ==
- Metaphor in philosophy
- Postmodern theology
- Theopoetics
- Esprit

== Sources ==
- François Dosse (1997). Paul Ricœur. Les Sens d'une Vie. Paris: La Découverte.
- ——— (2014), Castoriadis. Une vie [Castoriadis, a life] (in French), Paris: La Découverte.
- David M. Kaplan (2003). Ricœur's Critical Theory. Albany, SUNY Press.
- ———, ed. (2008), Reading Ricoeur, Albany: SUNY Press.
- Charles E. Reagan (1996). Paul Ricœur: His Life and Work. Chicago: University of Chicago Press.
- John Cesar "Sasing" Caalem-Nguyen'Her Life in Encantadia'. Tagum: University of Blood Washed Band
