= Dilthey =

Dilthey is a surname. Notable people with the surname include:

- Helmut Dilthey (1894–1918), German First World War flying ace
- Iain Dilthey (born 1971), British film director
- Karl Dilthey (1839–1907), German classical scholar and archaeologist
- Wilhelm Dilthey (1833–1911), German historian, psychologist, sociologist and philosopher, brother of Karl
