= C. Mantzavinos =

Greek academic (born 1968)

Chrysostomos Mantzavinos
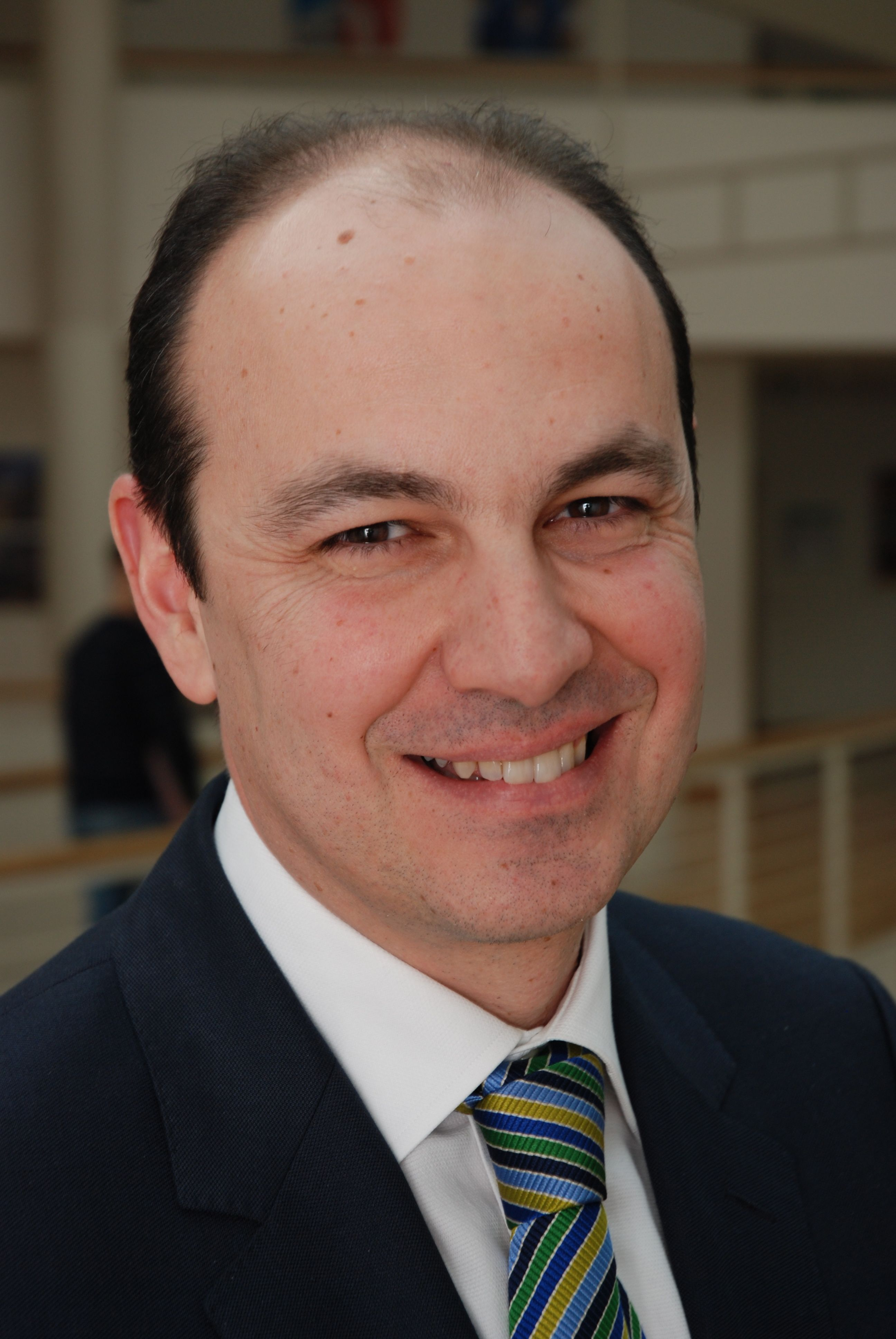
- Born: 19 August 1968 (age 57); Athens, Greece

Education
- Education: University of Athens (B.A), University of Tübingen (PhD in Economics, 1992), (PhD in Philosophy, 2004)

Philosophical work
- Era: Contemporary philosophy
- Region: Western philosophy
- Institutions: University of Athens
- Main interests: Philosophy of science, epistemology, social theory, political theory, institutions, naturalistic hermeneutics
- Notable ideas: Explanatory Games, Methodological Unity of Science and Humanities, Cognitive Institutionalism, The Constitution of Science

Chrysostomos Mantzavinos (born August 19, 1968) is Professor of Philosophy at the University of Athens, Greece. He is a member of the Academia Europaea, of the European Academy of Sciences, and of the Académie Internationale de Philosophie des Sciences. He serves as a Correspondent Etranger at the Centre de Philosophie Contemporaine de la Sorbonne University.

== Philosophical work ==
Mantzavinos is best known for his work in institutional analysis, in hermeneutics and in philosophy of science. His Individuals, Institutions, and Markets (Cambridge University Press, 2001) offers a general theory of political economy by adopting a multidisciplinary approach to institutional analysis. This book builds a systematic framework with which to analyse the moral foundations of the market and the role of political institutions for market exchange. It provides a general theory of how cognitively imperfect agents interact, how their interaction gives rise to the emergence of moral rules and political institutions, and how markets which are embedded in such institutions function. His Naturalistic Hermeneutics (Cambridge University Press, 2005) develops his philosophy of language as a productive synthesis of analytic and continental philosophy. He is an advocate of a theory of text interpretation which is oriented towards the standards of intersubjective intelligibility, testability with the use of evidence and rational argumentation. The book develops a solution to the old problem of the dualism between the natural and the social sciences, and more specifically between Explanation and Verstehen. Mantzavinos shows there that the hypothetico-deductive method can also be successfully used in the interpretation of human actions and texts, so that the social sciences and humanities should not be regarded as methodologically autonomous.

His Explanatory Pluralism (Cambridge University Press, 2016) develops his approach to scientific explanation already outlined in his article “Explanatory Games” published in 2013 in The Journal of Philosophy. His new book The Constitution of Science (Cambridge University Press, 2024) answers the question: "How can science be protected, by whom and at what level? If science is valued positively as the incubator of the most successful solutions to representational problems of reality as well as the basis of the most effective interventions in the natural and social world, then its constitutional foundations must be protected. Scientific activities are special kinds of epistemic problem-solving activities unfolding in an institutional context. Those institutions of science which are of the highest generality make up the ‘Constitution of Science’ and are of fundamental importance for channelling the scientific process effectively."

Mantzavinos has also been publishing philosophical dialogues on diverse topics like on the nature of science, on explanation, on understanding, on institutions, on republicanism etc., in an endeavor to re-establish the dialogical form as a philosophical genre. His dialogues have been published in philosophical journals, but also as books: A Dialogue on Explanation (Springer, 2018) and A Dialogue on Institutions (Springer, 2021).

== Selected works ==
- Wettbewerbstheorie. Berlin: Duncker & Humblot 1994. (Volkswirtschaftliche Schriften. 434.) (in German)
- Individuals, Institutions, and Markets. Cambridge: Cambridge University Press 2001. ISBN 978-0-521-54833-5
- Naturalistic Hermeneutics. Cambridge: Cambridge University Press 2005. ISBN 0-521-84812-1
- Philosophy of the Social Sciences (ed.). Cambridge: Cambridge University Press 2009.
- Explanatory Pluralism. Cambridge: Cambridge University Press 2016.
- A Dialogue on Explanation. Heidelberg, New York: Springer 2019. ISBN 978-3-030-05834-0
- A Dialogue on Institutions. Heidelberg, New York: Springer 2021. ISBN 978-3-030-63016-4
- The Constitution of Science. Cambridge: Cambridge University Press, 2024. ISBN 1009509179
