= Forrest Clingerman =

Forrest John Clingerman (1972–2024) was an American academic and author. A professor of philosophy and religion at Ohio Northern University, he served as the director of the honors program there since 2019 and was a significant figure in Environmental hermeneutics.

Clingerman was born on January 29, 1972, in Terre Haute, Indiana. He graduated from Deerfield Academy in Deerfield, Massachusetts. Clingerman then received his bachelor's degree from Augustana College in Rock Island, Illinois, where he met his wife, Gail whom he married in 1994, and later started a family. He received his Masters of Divinity from Boston University before earning his PhD from University of Iowa, completing his dissertation in Modern Religious Thought in 2005.

Clingerman co-edited with Brian Treanor, Martin Drenthen and David Utsler Interpreting Nature: The Emerging Field of Environmental Hermeneutics. With Sigurd Bergmann he co-edited Exploring Nature’s Texture: Engaging Environments Through Visual Arts and Religion, (Studies in Environmental Humanities, Leiden: Brill Rodopi).

In his 2011 book, Placing Nature on the Borders of Religion, Philosophy and Ethics Clingerman indicates a suspicion of the Lifeism worldview, echoing the concern of Wang Guowei by writing, "I love life. And I love living things. But I worry that as ethicists we have fallen into a bias: we are lifeists. And like sexism, racism, classism and speciesism, lifeism must be overcome."

Clingerman died in his Ohio home on April 21, 2024, at age 52.

To honor Clingerman's legacy Ohio Northern University created an Honors course “Clingerman on Environmental Studies,” offered in fall 2025.
