= List of thinkers influenced by deconstruction =

This is a list of thinkers who have been associated with or influenced by deconstruction, a term developed by French philosopher Jacques Derrida (1930–2004).

The thinkers included in this list have Wikipedia pages and satisfy at least one of the three following additional criteria: he or she has

- written about deconstruction;
- used uniquely deconstructive concepts in a published work; or
- has stated outright that deconstruction has influenced his or her thinking.

== B ==
- Houston A. Baker, Jr.: Baker is an influential theorist for African-American literature whose work draws on ideas from Jacques Derrida.
- Jack Balkin: Balkin is the Knight Professor of Constitutional Law and the First Amendment at Yale Law School and a renowned critical legal theorist. On his blog, Balkin said that deconstruction influenced his intellectual life.
- Geoffrey Bennington: Bennington is Asa Griggs Candler Professor of French and Professor of Comparative Literature, Emory University, as well as a member of the International College of Philosophy. He is a literary critic and philosopher, best known as an expert on deconstruction and the works of Jacques Derrida and Jean-François Lyotard. He has translated many of Derrida's works into English. Bennington co-wrote the book Jacques Derrida with Derrida. Jacques Derrida is a double book made by Derrida himself and Bennington in which the latter presents an analytic account of the former's work in the upper portion of each page ('Derridabase'), which Derrida then attempts to disrupt or outflank in the lower portion ('Circumfession').
- Robert Bernasconi: Bernasconi is the Lillian and Morrie Moss Professor of Philosophy at the University of Memphis. Bernasconi has written extensively on Heidegger and also Gadamer, Levinas, and Arendt, among others, recently pursuing an interest in race and racism. He has acknowledged and discussed the enormous importance of Derrida's contribution to the study of Heidegger.
- Homi K. Bhabha: Bhabha is a postcolonial theorist, currently teaching at Harvard University, where he is the Anne F. Rothenberg Professor of English and American Literature and Language. Bhabha brings together the insights of deconstruction and psychoanalysis in his investigations of social subordination.
- Harold Bloom: Bloom was the Sterling Professor of the Humanities at Yale University and Berg Professor of English and American Literature at New York University. In 1979, Bloom contributed to the influential Deconstruction and Criticism, a foundational text for the Yale School of deconstruction. Later, in a 1983 interview with Robert Moynihan, Bloom said, "What I think I have in common with the school of deconstruction is the mode of negative thinking or negative awareness, in the technical, philosophical sense of the negative, but which comes to me through negative theology... There is no escape, there is simply the given, and there is nothing that we can do." In accordance, Slavoj Žižek has identified the mid-to-late 1980s as the period when Derrida's deconstruction shifted from a radical negative theology to a Kantian idealism. In 1989, Bloom eschewed any identification with the Yale School's technical, methodological approach to literary criticism. He stated that "there is no method except yourself" and observed that deconstruction as a mode of thought is best understood as unique to Derrida. In a 2003 interview, Bloom recalled that in his past he found himself "fighting" deconstructionists. In the same interview, he stated that the deconstructionists were his friends and that what interests him in language is the Absolute, a notion he shares with Yale School deconstructionists and the negative theology of kabbalists.
- Karin de Boer is a Dutch Professor of Philosophy at the University of Leuven. She is known for her works in modern philosophy and contemporary continental philosophy.
- Judith Butler: Butler is a prominent American post-structuralist philosopher and has contributed to the fields of feminism, queer theory, political philosophy, and ethics. They are Maxine Elliot professor in the Departments of Rhetoric and Comparative Literature at the University of California, Berkeley. Many of Butler's works have taken up deconstructive themes.

== C ==
- John D. Caputo: Caputo is the Thomas J. Watson Professor of Humanities at Syracuse University and the founder of weak theology. Much of Caputo's work focuses on hermeneutics, phenomenology, deconstruction, and theology. He attempts to read the Danish philosopher Søren Kierkegaard as a deconstructionist.
- Stanley Cavell: Cavell was an American philosopher. He was the Walter M. Cabot Professor Emeritus of Aesthetics and the General Theory of Value at Harvard University. Cavell has written on Derrida's work.
- Hélène Cixous: Cixous is a professor, French feminist writer, poet, playwright, philosopher, literary critic and rhetorician.
- Joseph Cohen: University College Dublin professor who studied under Derrida at postgraduate level and has written extensively about Derrida and Levinas.
- Drucilla Cornell: Cornell is a professor of political science, women's studies, and comparative literature at Rutgers University.
- Simon Critchley: Critchley teaches philosophy at the New School for Social Research. Critchley has written a number of books on Derrida, including The Ethics of Deconstruction: Derrida and Levinas and Ethics-Politics-Subjectivity: Essays on Derrida, Levinas, and Contemporary French Thought. Critchley has said that Derrida was a "brilliant reader" and that it is imperative to follow his example.
- Jonathan Culler: Culler is Class of 1966 Professor of English and Comparative Literature at Cornell University. He has written a number of books about deconstruction.

== D ==
- Hamid Dabashi: Dabashi is an Iranian-born American intellectual historian, cultural and literary critic best known for his scholarship on Iran and Shi'a Islam. He is the Hagop Kevorkian Professor of Iranian Studies and Comparative Literature at Columbia University in New York, the oldest and most prestigious Chair in Iranian Studies. In the essay "In the Absence of the Face", Dabashi uses deconstructive methods in his investigation of the Judeo-Islamic heritage.
- Samuel R. Delany: Delany is an American science fiction author, widely known in the academic world as a literary critic. His essays and novels have been influenced by deconstruction.
- Jacques Derrida: Derrida was an Algerian-born French philosopher, known as the founder of deconstruction. He famously wrote "il n'y a pas de hors-texte" (there is no outside-of-the-text).
- Alexander García Düttmann: Düttmann is Professor of Philosophy and Visual Culture at Goldsmiths College, University of London. His work focuses on art, language, history, politics, and deconstruction. He published Self Portrait and Lifelines and a text about Visconti. His research has focused on the relationship between language and history in authors such as Adorno, Benjamin and Heidegger.
- Paulo Cesar Duque-Estrada: Duque-Estrada is Professor of Philosophy at Pontifical Catholic University of Rio de Janeiro, with a Ph.D at Boston College. He founded the Study Group in Ethics and Deconstruction, (NEED- Núcleo de Estudos em Ética e Desconstrução) and has published various works on Derrida, Heidegger, Gadamer, Levinas, and Husserl. He was the first to bring Derrida's thought to the field of philosophy within the academic environment in Brazil.

== E ==
- Lee Edelman: (1953–) American queer theorist and Fletcher Professor of English Literature at Tufts University. Author of Homographesis: Essays in Gay Literary and Cultural Theory (1994) and No Future: Queer Theory and the Death Drive (2005). Edelman is famous for his critique of reproductive futurism and his controversial insistence on the antisocial quality of sexuality.
- Jacques Ehrmann: (1931–1972) French literary theorist and faculty member of the Yale University French Department from 1961 until his death in 1972. Influential in the Structuralism movement in the 1960s leading up to deconstruction. As contemporary and peer of Jacques Derrida, he invited him to Yale for the first time in 1968.

== F ==
- Shoshana Felman: Felman is Woodruff Professor of Comparative Literature and French at Emory University. She was on the faculty of Yale University from 1970 to 2004, where she became Thomas E. Donnelley Professor of French and Comparative Literature. Although much of Felman's more recent work focuses on Lacanian psychoanalysis, her early work was heavily influenced by the Yale school of deconstruction.
- Christopher Fynsk: Fynsk is a Professor in the School of Language and Literature at the University of Aberdeen and at the European Graduate School. In his book, Heidegger: Thought and Historicity (1993, 2nd edn.), he acknowledges that "the influence of Jacques Derrida, Philippe Lacoue-Labarthe, and Jean-Luc Nancy on the pages that follow is far greater than I have been able to indicate." He was also a participant in Lacoue-Labarthe and Nancy's Centre for Philosophical Research on the Political.
- Mark Fisher who understood the liminality and aporia of hauntology as opening up new possibilities for politics.

== G ==
- Rodolphe Gasché: Gasché holds the Eugenio Donato Chair of Comparative Literature at the University of Buffalo, State University of New York. He is the author of numerous books, including the influential The Tain of the Mirror: Derrida and the Philosophy of Reflection (1986), and Inventions of Difference: On Jacques Derrida (1994).

== H ==
- Werner Hamacher: Hamacher is Professor for General and Comparative Literature at the University of Frankfurt and is Global Distinguished Professor at New York University. Hamacher writes in the tradition of the Yale School of deconstruction and touches on topics including politics, literature, and philosophy.
- Michael Hardt: Hardt is an American literary theorist and political philosopher based at Duke University. With Antonio Negri he wrote Empire. Hardt's work has been influenced by deconstruction.
- Geoffrey Hartman: Hartman was the Sterling Professor emeritus of English and Comparative Literature at Yale University. He was part of the Yale School of deconstruction and wrote extensively using deconstructive concepts.

== I ==
- Luce Irigaray: Irigaray is a Belgian feminist and psychoanalytic and cultural theorist. Luce Irigaray was born in Belgium in the 1930s. She employs deconstructive concepts in advancing her message. In the second semester of 1982, Irigaray held the chair in Philosophy at the Erasmus University in Rotterdam. Research here resulted in the publication of An Ethics of Sexual Difference, establishing Irigaray as a major Continental philosopher.

== J ==
- Fredric Jameson: Jameson, a Marxist political and literary critic, was William A. Lane Professor of Comparative Literature and Romance Studies at Duke University. His work engages with the continental tradition of philosophy, including deconstruction.
- Barbara Johnson: Johnson was an American literary critic and translator. She was a Professor of English and Comparative Literature and the Fredric Wertham Professor of Law and Psychiatry in Society at Harvard University. She studied at Yale University while the Yale School of deconstruction was in ascendence. Much of her work centered on social subordination, identity politics, literary theory, and deconstruction.

== K ==
- Peggy Kamuf: Kamuf is the Marion Frances Chevalier Professor of French and Professor of French and Comparative Literature at the University of Southern California. Kamuf's principal research interests are in literary theory and contemporary French thought and literature. She has written extensively on the work of Jacques Derrida, Hélène Cixous, and Jean-Luc Nancy, and she has also translated a number of their texts.
- Kojin Karatani: Karatani is a Japanese philosopher and literary critic associated with the Yale School of deconstruction. Karatani has interrogated the possibility of a de Manian deconstruction and engaged in a dialogue with Jacques Derrida on the occasion of the Second International Conference on Humanistic Discourse, organized by the University of Montreal. Derrida commented on Karatani's paper, 'Nationalism and Ecriture' with an emphasis on the interpretation of his own concept of écriture.
- Duncan Kennedy: Kennedy is the Carter Professor of General Jurisprudence at Harvard Law School and a renowned critical legal theorist. Kennedy has written more than a few articles investigating deconstructive concepts, including the article "A Semiotics of Critique".
- Sarah Kofman: Kofman was a French philosopher and author of many books, especially known for her works on Sigmund Freud and Friedrich Nietzsche. She was a student and colleague of Derrida, and after her death he wrote about Kofman and her work.
- Mario Kopić: Kopić is a Croatian philosopher, author, and translator. His main areas of interest include history of ideas, philosophy of culture, phenomenology, and philosophy of religion. He has influenced by and writes extensively on Jacques Derrida. He also translated works by Derrida into Croatian.
- Julia Kristeva: Kristeva is a Bulgarian-French philosopher, psychoanalyst, feminist, and novelist. Kristeva is a prolific writer who has employed deconstructive concepts in many of her books.
- Lawrence D. Kritzman: Kritzman is a theorist of Renaissance literature and a cultural critic. Inspired by the thought of Jacques Derrida and psychoanalysis, he has innovated the study of sixteenth century texts. He holds the John D. Willard Professor of French, Comparative Literature, and Oratory at Dartmouth College.

== L ==
- Philippe Lacoue-Labarthe: Lacoue-Labarthe was a French philosopher, literary critic, and translator. Lacoue-Labarthe, like Jean-Luc Nancy, was a student and then colleague of Derrida. In addition to writing many books (including together), Lacoue-Labarthe and Nancy were co-directors of the short-lived Centre for Philosophical Research on the Political, which developed out of a 1980 colloquium devoted to the political questions arising from Derrida's work. Lacoue-Labarthe's book, Typography: Mimesis, Philosophy, Politics (1989), contains an introduction by Derrida, "Desistance", consisting in a long discussion of Lacoue-Labarthe's work. Lacoue-Labarthe was also a passionate reader of Hölderlin and provided an idiosyncratic reading of his texts concerning a particular concept of Greece through the German poet's view to it.
- Ernesto Laclau: Laclau is an Argentinian political theorist often described as post-Marxist. He is a professor at the University of Essex where he holds a chair in Political Theory and was for many years director of the doctoral Programme in Ideology and Discourse Analysis. He has lectured extensively in many universities in North America, Latin America, Western Europe, Australia, and South Africa. Recently, he left The University at Buffalo and now teaches at Northwestern University. Laclau has stated that his writings take a deconstructive approach.
- Leonard Lawlor: Lawlor is Sparks Professor of Philosophy at Penn State University. His books include This is not Sufficient: An Essay on Human Nature and Animality in Derrida (Columbia, 2007) and Derrida and Husserl (Indiana University Press, 2002).
- John Llewelyn: Prior to his retirement Llewelyn was Reader in Philosophy at Edinburgh University and held Visiting Professorships at the Universities of Memphis and Loyola (Chicago). Among the first Anglophone philosophers to engage constructively with the work of Derrida, he published Derrida on the Threshold of Sense in 1986 and continued a productive engagement with Derrida's thought throughout his subsequent research and in an extensive body of published work. Appositions – of Jacques Derrida and Emmanuel Levinas was published in 2002 and Margins of Religion: Between Kierkegaard and Derrida in 2009.
- Niall Lucy: Lucy was Professor of Media, Culture and Creative Arts at Curtin University. His books include Debating Derrida (Melbourne University Press, 1995) and A Derrida Dictionary (Wiley-Blackwell, 2004). The increasing tendency in Lucy's later work towards a philosophical engagement with contemporary events is strongly informed by Derrida's Specters of Marx and the idea of democracy-to-come, which is the linchpin of Lucy's account of the importance of deconstruction in A Derrida Dictionary (2004).

== M ==
- Louis H. Mackey: Mackey was a professor of philosophy at the University of Texas at Austin. In 1983 Mackey rebutted John R. Searle during "An Exchange on Deconstruction" in The New York Review of Books. Mackey wrote extensively on the topic of deconstruction, but he also used deconstruction as a tool for the critical analysis of texts, even when not specifically discussing deconstruction itself.
- Robert Magliola, b. 1940, is professor of philosophy and religions, (Interfaith-) Graduate School of Philosophy and Religions, Assumption University of Thailand, and distinguished chair professor, Graduate School of Liberal Arts, National Taiwan University,--retired; Interfaith advisor of Ling Jiou Shan Buddhist Society (Taiwan)'s One Center, N.Y. U.S.A. (2002–2019); Affiliate, comunità Vangelo & Zen, Desio and Milano, Italy (2012-present). His Derrida on the Mend (Purdue University Press, 1984; 1986; rpt. 2000–) pioneered the intersection of Derridean argumentation and the deconstructive mode of Madhyamaka Buddhism (and of Nagarjuna in particular), and was highly praised by Raimundo Panikkar, Paul Ricoeur, and the well-known Buddhologist Frederick Streng. Magliola's On Deconstructing Life-Worlds: Buddhism, Christianity, Culture (1997; 2000–) has been robustly endorsed by Joseph S. O'Leary, Edith Wyschogrod, and John D. Caputo. Its first part is an exercise in Derridean "oto-biography", and its last part adapts some Derridean thought-motifs to Catholicism's theology of the Trinity. Magliola's oeuvre, including his books, book-chapters, and articles, is treated in Jin Y. Park, ed., Buddhisms and Deconstructions (2006), which collects the papers from the "Close Encounter" session on Magliola's work, 23rd Annual Meeting of the International Association for Philosophy and Literature (1999) and adds, as well, papers by David Loy and Roger R. Jackson. Magliola's Facing Up to Real Doctrinal Difference: How Some Thought-Motifs from Derrida Can Nourish the Catholic-Buddhist Encounter (2014) adapts Derridean maneuvers to serve the Buddhist-Catholic Dialogue in which he has been active for many years. The book has strong recommendations from prominent Buddhist scholar-monks such as Bhikkhu Bodhi and Catholic theologians such as Gavin D'Costa.
- Catherine Malabou: Malabou is a French philosopher and currently maître de conferences in the Philosophy Department at the Université Paris-X Nanterre, as well as Visiting Professor in the Comparative Literature Department at the University of California, Irvine. Of great importance to her is the concept of "plasticity", which she draws from the work of Hegel, as well as from neuroscience, and which she sees as taking a step beyond grammatology. She is at present interested in rethinking the relation between psychoanalysis and neuroscience, through the concept of trauma and in a way which draws on deconstruction.
- Paul de Man: De Man was a Belgian-born deconstructionist literary critic and theorist. As a member of the Yale School of deconstruction, de Man was instrumental in popularizing deconstruction as a form of literary criticism in the United States. De Man made extensive use of deconstructive concepts throughout his career.
- Michael Marder: Marder is Ikerbasque Research Professor in the Department of Philosophy at the University of the Basque Country, Vitoria-Gasteiz. Having published extensively on deconstruction, his books include "Event of the Thing: Derrida's Post-Deconstructive Realism", "Groundless Existence: The Political Ontology of Carl Schmitt", "Plant-Thinking: A Philosophy of Vegetal Life", "Phenomena-Critique-Logos: The Project of Critical Phenomenology", "The Philosopher's Plant: An Intellectual Herbarium", "Pyropolitics: When the World Is Ablaze", and "Dust (Object Lessons)".
- J. Hillis Miller: Miller was a Distinguished Professor of English at the University of California Irvine. He was part of the Yale School of deconstruction and has written extensively using deconstructive concepts.
- W.J.T. Mitchell: Mitchell is Gaylord Donnelley Distinguished Service professor of English and Art History at the University of Chicago. He is also the editor of Critical Inquiry, and contributes to the journal October. Mitchell co-authored a book about Derrida with Arnold I. Davidson entitled The Late Derrida.
- Fred Moten: Moten is Professor in the Departments of Performance Studies and Comparative Literature at New York University. A former student of deconstructionists Barbara Johnson at Harvard and Avital Ronell at University of California, Berkeley, both of whom he cites as "folks who were moving in this sort of Derridean line," Moten frequently engages the work of Derrida, especially in his first book, In the Break: the Aesthetics of the Black Radical Tradition (2003). Moten has also drawn upon the writings of Martin Heidegger in his work.
- Chantal Mouffe: Mouffe holds a professorship at the University of Westminster in England. She writes primarily about political issues and employs deconstructive strategies in doing so.

== N ==
Jean-Luc Nancy

- Jean-Luc Nancy: Nancy was a French philosopher and author. Nancy, like Philippe Lacoue-Labarthe, was a student and then colleague of Derrida. In addition to writing many books (including together), Nancy and Lacoue-Labarthe were co-directors of the short-lived Centre for Philosophical Research on the Political, which developed out of a 1980 colloquium devoted to the political questions arising from Derrida's work. Derrida's book, Le toucher, Jean-Luc Nancy (2000), is about Nancy's writing.
- Christopher Norris: Norris holds the title of Distinguished Research Professor in Philosophy at Cardiff University. Norris has been influenced by Derrida and the Yale School. Norris is known for arguing against relativism and in favor of a point of view he calls "deconstructive realism".

== O ==
- James Olthuis: Olthuis is an inter-disciplinary scholar in ethics, hermeneutics, philosophical theology, as well as a theorist and practitioner of psychotherapy of a kind he calls "Relational psychotherapy". He is Senior Member Emeritus of Ethics and Philosophical Theology at the Institute for Christian Studies, Toronto.

== R ==
- Peter Rollins: Rollins is an Irish theologian who specializes in the intermixing of post-structural thought and emerging church theology.
- Avital Ronell: Ronell is University Professor of German and Comparative Literature, New York University. Her work deals with theories of technology, social hierarchies, ethics, and aesthetics, among other topics. She is considered a disciple of Derrida.
- Richard Rorty: Rorty was an American philosopher, professor of comparative literature, and, by courtesy, philosophy at Stanford University. Having started his career writing in the analytic tradition of philosophy, Rorty's later works take up pragmatic and deconstructive themes.
- John Russon: Russon is the Presidential Distinguished Professor of Philosophy at the University of Guelph in Guelph, Ontario. He is the author of Human Experience and Bearing Witness to Epiphany . He has used ideas of deconstruction in relationship to mental health, relationships, politics, and art.

== S ==
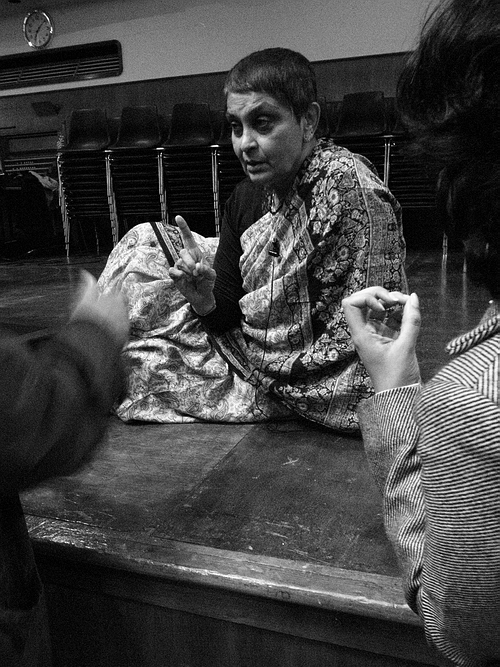
Gayatri Chakravorty Spivak

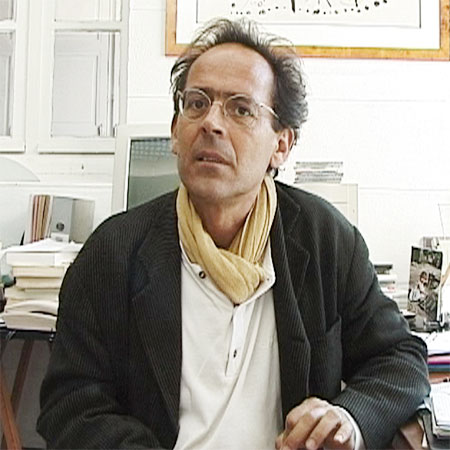
Bernard Stiegler

- John Sallis: Sallis is Frederick J. Adelmann Professor of Philosophy at Boston College. The work of Sallis and Derrida intertwines at many points, notably in their readings of the Platonic dialogue Timaeus. An essay by Derrida about Sallis's work is included in Kenneth Maly (ed.), The Path of Archaic Thinking: Unfolding the Work of John Sallis (1995).
- Pierre Schlag: Schlag is University Distinguished Professor and the Byron R. White Professor of Law at the University of Colorado. Schlag is a critical legal theorist and has written about deconstruction and the law.
- Hugh J. Silverman: Silverman is Professor of Philosophy, and Literary and Cultural Studies at Stony Brook University and Executive Director of the International Association for Philosophy and Literature. His Derrida and Deconstruction (1989), The Textual Sublime: Deconstruction and its Differences (1990), and Textualities: Between Hermeneutics and Deconstruction (1994) are a few of the books and essays in which deconstruction plays a major role. He organized the first conference on Derrida in which Derrida participated at Stony Brook University in 1977. The International Association for Philosophy and Literature often features conference sessions on or about Derrida.
- Gayatri Chakravorty Spivak: Spivak currently teaches at Columbia University. Spivak, a notable advocate of postcolonialism, studied with Paul de Man, translated Derrida's Of Grammatology and has used deconstructive concepts in her books.
- Bernard Stiegler: Stiegler was a French philosopher and Director of the Department of Cultural Development at the Centre Georges-Pompidou. Stiegler's work owes a great debt to both Heidegger and Derrida, while nevertheless offering decisive critiques of each.
- Peter Szendy: Szendy is a French philosopher and musicologist who teaches at the University of Nanterre. Szendy's work focuses on the theory of listening and reading.

== T ==
- Mark C. Taylor: Taylor is the Chair of the Religion Department at Columbia University. He is among the first authors to connect deconstruction with religious thought and has authored many books using deconstructive concepts. Taylor calls himself a "philosopher of culture".

== U ==
- Gregory Ulmer: Ulmer is Professor of Electronic Languages and Cybermedia at the University of Florida. Ulmer's work focuses on hypertext, electracy, and cyberlanguage and is frequently associated with "emerAgency", "fetishturgy", "choragraphy", and "mystoriography". He is the author of Applied Grammatology: Post(e)-Pedagogy from Jacques Derrida to Joseph Beuys; Teletheory: Grammatology in the Age of Video; Heuretics: The Logic of Invention; Internet Invention: From Literacy to Electracy; and Electronic Monuments.
- Friedrich Ulfers: Ulfers is Professor of German Studies at New York University. Ulfer's work has no focus but takes focus beyond the limits of representability and discusses his metaphor-conception of "chiasmic unity" in the texts of Friedrich Nietzsche, Sigmund Freud, Martin Heidegger, and Franz Kafka, which entails a philosophy of non-decisive thinking where no hierarchy can be seen as implicated by way of a metaphysics.

== V ==
- Kevin Vanhoozer – American theologian and academic (born 1957) who has critiqued deconstruction extensively, including in his book Is There Meaning in this Text?: The Bible, the Reader, and the Morality of Literary Knowledge.
- Hent de Vries: De Vries is currently Professor of the Humanities and Philosophy at the Johns Hopkins University, and Professor of Philosophy at the University of Amsterdam. De Vries has been instrumental in explaining the apophatic and other theological claims and dimensions of deconstruction and for demonstrating its import for an understanding of religion in contemporary philosophy and culture.
- Gerald Vizenor: Vizenor is currently Professor Emeritus at the University of California, Berkeley, and Professor of American Studies at the University of New Mexico. According to Louis Owens, Vizenor employed deconstructive strategies in his novel Darkness in Saint Louis Bearheart. Vizenor has stated that his writing strategy involves deconstructing the subjugated position of Native Americans in dominant literary discourses.

== W ==
- Samuel Weber: Weber is the Avalon Foundation Professor of Humanities at Northwestern University. He is known for his writings on deconstruction, literary theory, and psychoanalysis.
- Charles Winquist: Winquist was the Thomas J. Watson Professor of Religion at Syracuse University and a noted proponent of weak theology. According to John D. Caputo, Winquist employed deconstructive strategies in his theological writings.
- David Wood: Wood is Professor of Philosophy at Vanderbilt University. His work is influenced by Jacques Derrida, and he is the author of several books, including The Deconstruction of Time (1988) and The Step Back: Ethics and Politics after Deconstruction (2005).
- Edith Wyschogrod: Wyschogrod is a Levinas scholar who engages with the work of Jacques Derrida, Martin Heidegger, Dominique Janicaud and others.
- Graham Ward: Ward has been influenced by Derrida, Foucault, Žižek, and others. Of special importance are his Barth, Derrida, and the Language of Theology (1995) and his article on deconstructive theology in The Cambridge Companion to Postmodern Theology (2003). He currently teaches Contextual Theology and Ethics at the University of Manchester.

== Z ==
Raphaël Zagury-Orly

== See also ==
- Continental philosophy
- Deconstruction
- Différance
- Hermeneutics
- Metaphysics of presence
- Ontotheology
