= Criticism in the Wilderness =

1980 book by Geoffrey Hartman

Criticism in the Wilderness: The Study of Literature Today
- Cover of the second edition of Criticism in the Wilderness, published in 2007.
- Author: Geoffrey Hartman
- Language: English
- Subject: Literary criticism
- Publication date: 1980
- Publication place: United States
- Media type: Print
- ISBN: 0-300-02085-6
- Dewey Decimal: 801'.95'0904 80—13491
- LC Class: PN94.H34

Criticism in the Wilderness: The Study of Literature Today is a 1980 book by literary critic Geoffrey Hartman. In the book, Hartman argues for literary criticism to be taken as seriously as a form of creative literature in its own right, and he discusses the difficulties that literature professors face in the contemporary American university.

== Overview ==
Hartman contends that works like Jacques Derrida's Glas, Norman O. Brown's Closing Time, Thomas Carlyle's Sartor Resartus, and Samuel Taylor Coleridge's Biographia Literaria represent a current of literary criticism that is as creative and idiosyncratic as the canonical works that critics have historically studied and written about.

Hartman also examines the professional dilemmas of literature professors, who despite their subversive sympathies, must accept that their college teaching places them in the position of educating students whose literary education polishes them to take leadership roles in power networks that are opposed to the values the professors hope to inculcate.

A second edition of the book, with a foreword by Hayden White, was published by Yale University Press in 2007.

== Reception ==
Criticism in the Wilderness was widely reviewed in the academic press, and received largely positive and admiring assessments.

Harriet Ritvo, writing in The Threepenny Review, gave high praise for the book:

Hartman flatly rejects the distinction between literature and criticism. Instead, he asserts that both are kinds of "writing." Throughout the volume, he alternates between analysis or "reading" of conventionally literary works and of criticism with no apparent alteration of method: in one chapter, for example, he discusses his colleague Harold Bloom right alongside Thomas Carlyle. He acknowledges that most criticism is secondary in the sense that it is about other writing, but he firmly resists the inference that this necessarily makes it inferior. As a result, reading—the work of critics—becomes a heroically strenuous activity. Instead of a respectful effort to divine and interpret the author's intentions, it is a struggle between author and reader-critic for control of the work. The results include greatly expanded opportunities for critical pyrotechnics—and some of Hartman's are breathtaking.

Alexander Argyros and Jerry Aline Flieger reviewed Criticism in the Wilderness in Diacritics, and were positive in their assessment. They stated: "Hartman's work is above all, a polemics of style, the stylist's manifesto, an assertion of the critic's right to a literary style, along with the corollary repudiation of the dream of a 'pure' language 'that no longer mixes images and meanings.'"

James Mall, writing in The Journal of Aesthetics and Art Criticism, questioned why Hartman did not write the kind of context-breaking critical work that Criticism in the Wilderness celebrates: "Hartman's energetic plea for the right to engage in a more personal, 'creative criticism' is needless. The form of writing he defends is certainly not revolutionary, as his own comments on Carlyle, Emerson, Valery, Derrida, and Bloom indicate. Why, then, has he not written the kind of book he claims to wish to write?"

Richard Boyd Hauck, reviewing Criticism in the Wilderness in Modern Fiction Studies, wrote that "the advanced student can find some rare things here: an essay on literary commentary as literature, an analysis of the psychology of the critic, a chapter on the history of practical criticism, an admiring defense against (not attack upon) T. S. Eliot, an interesting discussion of how Walter Benjamin took criticism out of the world of art into 'all sectors of daily life,' and some expansions upon Harold Bloom's 'insights.'"

A.D. Nuttall, writing in The Modern Language Review, said: "Professor Hartman knows a great deal and writes very elegantly, with a sort of brilliant vagueness which arises, curiously enough, from firm critical principle. The principle is the Romantic theorem that literature is a mystery which is profaned by explanation or paraphrase."

Susan Handelman, reviewing the book in The Wordsworth Circle, gave the following appraisal: "Hartman's book is, above all, a passionate reassertion of the authority and creativity of the critic, an argument for a broad 'philosophical criticism,' whose relation to art is, in his words, 'symbiotic' not 'parasitic.'"

Peter Rudnytsky in World Literature Today wrote that Criticism in the Wilderness, as "an unqualified triumph both of speculation and close reading, is itself that 'demonstration of freedom' which, according to Geoffrey Hartman, each 'work of art' and 'work of reading' may potentially be. Succeeding brilliantly in the critic's double task of responding to 'the extraordinary language-event' while yet maintaining 'a prose of the center,' Hartman returns us 'to a larger and darker view of art as mental charm, war, and purgation.'"

Daniel Hughes in Modern Language Notes wrote that "[o]ne of the strengths of Hartman's work has always been the depth of his understanding and the generosity of his response to other critics. He works through and around them, saving what suits him and even praising what he cannot accept...."

Richard Levin reviewed Criticism in the Wilderness in Modern Philology, and wrote that "[i]t is in many respects a very impressive achievement—prodigiously learned, deeply engaged, charged with energy and excitement, and written in a finely honed and often eloquent style. It is also a very difficult book which makes few concessions to its readers."

Sarah Lawall, reviewing the book in Comparative Literature, wrote that "it is clear from Criticism in the Wilderness that Hartman (especially in the three 'polemical pieces' at the end) sees himself as the herald of a contemporary humanistic re-vision blending analytical and creative consciousness, the English-American and continental European heritage."

Lawall went on to say that

the great merit of this study is the way it moves from illustrating the contingent nature of reading (the modeled "work of reading") to an understanding of the creative consciousness as that which gives us identity, situates us in time and culture. Hartman's reading itself is exemplary: that is, it is an example of a truly responsive reading of literary and critical texts related to the problem of individual human understanding."

Shuli Barzilai and Morton Bloomfield in New Literary History wrote that "[t]he act of writing itself, the 'question of critical style,' is one of the main polemical concerns of Geoffrey Hartman's Criticism in the Wilderness. In his essays Hartman repeatedly inveighs not only against the subordination of criticism to literature, but also against the tedium of a stylistic decorum which reduces criticism to the level of formal conversation."

== See also ==
- Geoffrey Hartman
- Yale school

== Sources ==
- Argyros, Alexander; Flieger, Jerry Aline (Spring 1987). "Hartman's Contagious Orbit: Reassessing Aesthetic Criticism. A review of Criticism in the Wilderness: The Study of Literature Today by Geoffrey Hartman; Deconstruction and the Question of the Text by Geoffrey Hartman; Psychoanalysis and the Question of the Text by Geoffrey Hartman; Saving the Text:Literature/Derrida/Philosophy by Geoffrey Hartman". Diacritics. 17 (1): 52–69. doi:10.2307/464767. JSTOR 464767.
- Atkins, G. Douglas (1990). Geoffrey Hartman: Criticism as Answerable Style. London: Routledge. p. 141. ISBN 0-415-02094-8.
- Barzilai, Shuli; Bloomfield, Morton W. (1986). "New Criticism and Deconstructive Criticism, or What's New?". New Literary History. 18 (1): 151. doi:10.2307/468660. JSTOR 468660.
- Detweiler, Robert (September 1982). "Review of Criticism in the Wilderness: The Study of Literature Today". The South Atlantic Review. 47 (3: Convention Program Issue): 83–86. doi:10.2307/3199274. JSTOR 3199274.
- Dorenkamp, Angela (Winter 1980). "Review of Criticism in the Wilderness: The Study of Literature Today". CrossCurrents. 30 (4): 459–461. JSTOR 24458127.
- Graff, Gerald (2007). Professing Literature: An Institutional History (Twentieth Anniversary ed.). Chicago: University of Chicago Press. pp. 247, 303. ISBN 978-0-226-30559-2.
- Handelman, Susan (Summer 1981). "Review of Criticism in the Wilderness: The Study of Literature Today by Geoffrey Hartman". The Wordsworth Circle. 12 (3): 202–206. doi:10.1086/TWC24040603. JSTOR 24040603.
- Hartman, Geoffrey (1980). Criticism in the Wilderness: The Study of Literature Today. New Haven: Yale University Press. ISBN 0-300-02085-6.
- Hartman, Geoffrey (5 April 1981). "How Creative Should Literary Criticism Be?". The New York Times.
- Hauck, Richard Boyd (Summer 1981). "Review of Criticism in the Wilderness: The Study of Literature Today by Geoffrey H. Hartman; Edges of Extremity: Some Problems of Literary Modernism, University of Tulsa Monograph Series, No. 17 by Kingsley Widmer; Language in Modern Literature: Innovation and Experiment by Jacob Korg; The Comedy of Language: Studies in Modern Comic Literature by Fred Miller Robinson". Modern Fiction Studies. 27 (2): 388–391. JSTOR 26280713.
- Hughes, Daniel (December 1981). "Review of Criticism in the Wilderness and Saving the Text by Geoffrey Hartman". Modern Language Notes. 96 (5: Comparative Literature): 1134–1148. JSTOR 2906241.
- Johnston, Kenneth (September 1981). "Review of Criticism in the Wilderness: The Study of Literature Today and The Humanities in American Life: Report of the Commission on the Humanities". College English. 43 (5): 471–482, 487–489. doi:10.2307/377068. JSTOR 377068.
- Lawall, Sarah (Spring 1982). "Review of Criticism in the Wilderness: The Study of Literature Today". Comparative Literature. 34 (2): 177–181. doi:10.2307/1770764. JSTOR 1770764.
- Levin, Richard (February 1982). "Review of Criticism in the Wilderness: The Study of Literature Today". Modern Philology. 79 (3): 340–346. doi:10.1086/391152. JSTOR 437165.
- Mall, James (Winter 1981). "Review of Criticism in the Wilderness: The Study of Literature Today". The Journal of Aesthetics and Art Criticism. 40 (2): 227–229. doi:10.2307/430424. JSTOR 430424.
- Nuttall, A.D. (April 1982). "Review of Criticism in the Wilderness: The Study of Literature Today". The Modern Language Review. 77 (2): 439–440. doi:10.2307/3726844. JSTOR 3726844.
- "Review of Criticism in the Wilderness". Poetics Today. 3 (1: Types of the Novel, Semiotics of Social Discourse): 197. Winter 1982. doi:10.2307/1772221. JSTOR 1772221.
- Regier, W. G. (1981). "Review of Criticism in the Wilderness: The Study of Literature Today by Geoffrey Hartman; Saving the Text: Literature/Derrida/Philosophy by Geoffrey Hartman". SubStance. 10:3 (32: Versions: Feminisms': A Stance of One's Own): 86–90. doi:10.2307/3684094. JSTOR 3684094.
- Ritvo, Harriet (Summer 1982). "Darkness Visible: Review of Criticism in the Wilderness: The Study of Literature Today by Geoffrey Hartman and After the New Criticism by Frank Lentricchia". The Threepenny Review (10): 8–9. JSTOR 4383116.
- Rudnytsky, Peter (Summer 1981). "Review of Criticism in the Wilderness: The Study of Literature Today". World Literature Today. 55 (3: Varia Issue): 537–538. doi:10.2307/40136848. JSTOR 40136848.
- White, Debra Elise (2014). Ferguson, Frances; Goodman, Kevis (eds.). "About Geoffrey Hartman: Materials for a Study of Intellectual Influence". Philological Quarterly. 93 (2): 232–236.
