= Thomas Bain (disambiguation) =

Thomas Bain (1834–1915) was a Canadian politician.

Thomas Bain may also refer to:

- Thomas Charles John Bain (1830–1893), South African road engineer
- Thomas Bain (Orange) (born 1964), British-born Indian dean

== See also ==
- Thomas Baines (disambiguation)
