= Robert Lufkin =

American physician

- Education: Brown University; University of Virginia
- Occupations: Physician; Professor; Inventor

Robert Lufkin is an American physician, inventor, writer, and professor. He is the author of Lies I Taught in Medical School and the inventor of the Lufkin Needle.

== Biography ==
Lufkin studied computer science at Brown University and completed his medical degree at the University of Virginia School of Medicine. In 2024, he published the book Lies I Taught in Medical School. He is currently a Clinical Professor of Radiology at the USC Keck School of Medicine with an academic focus on the applied science of longevity.

== Publications ==
=== Books ===
- Robert B. Lufkin and William N. Hanafee. Pocket Atlas of Head and Neck MRI Anatomy (1989). 1st ed.
- Robert B. Lufkin, ed. The MRI Manual (1990). 1st ed.
- Antonio de Sales and Robert Lufkin, eds. Minimally Invasive Therapy of the Brain (1997)
- The MRI Manual (1997). 2nd ed.
- Interventional MRI (1998).
- D.H.W. Grömemeyer, and R. B. Lufkin, eds. Open Field Magnetic Resonance Imaging (2000)
- Robert Lufkin, Alexandra Borges, and Pablo Villablanca. Teaching Atlas of Head and Neck Imaging (2000).
- Robert Lufkin, Alexandra Borges, Kim M. Nguyen, and Yoshimi Anzai, eds. MRI of the Head and Neck (2000). 2nd ed.
- Pocket Atlas of Head and Neck MRI Anatomy (2000). 2nd ed.
- Lies I Taught in Medical School (2024)

=== Academic papers ===
- Interventional Magnetic Resonance Imaging of the Head and Neck and New Imaging Techniques.
- Somatosensory Evoked Response Source Localization Using Actual Cortical Surface as the Spatial Constraint.
- MRI-Guided Access to the Retropharynx.
- Enhancing Access to the Parapharyngeal Space.

== Inventions ==
Lufkin developed an MR-compatible biopsy needle, which is often called the Lufkin Needle.
