= Dori Laub =

Israeli professor

- דורי לאוב
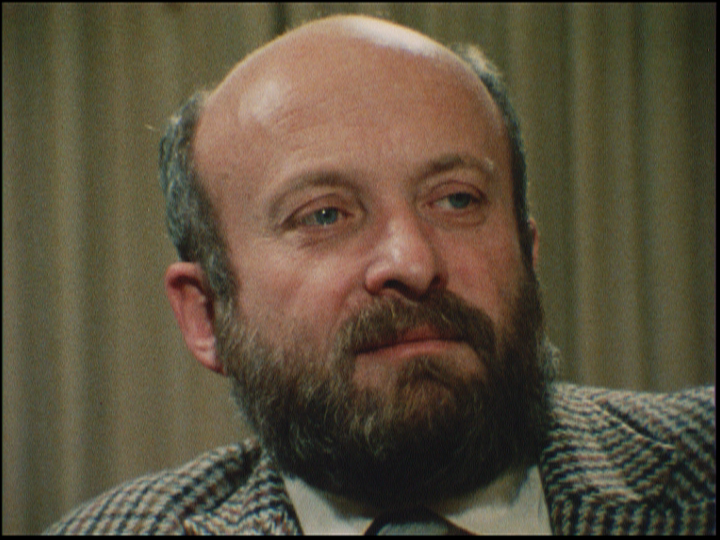
- Dori Laub, image from an informational film produced in 1982 by the Fortunoff Video Archive for Holocaust Testimonies
- Born: June 8, 1937; Cernăuți, Bukovina, Romania (present-day Ukraine)
- Died: June 23, 2018 (aged 81); Woodbridge, Connecticut
- Education: The Hebrew University of Jerusalem, Yale University, Harvard University
- Occupations: psychiatrist, psychoanalyst, clinical professor
- Known for: Research in the fields of psychiatry, emotional trauma, and testimony research
- Spouse: Johanna Bodenstab (1961-2015)

Dori Laub (Hebrew: דורי לאוב; June 8, 1937 – June 23, 2018) was an Israeli-American psychiatrist and psychoanalyst, a clinical professor in Yale University’s Department of Psychiatry, an expert in the area of testimony methodology, and a trauma researcher. A Holocaust survivor himself, Laub co-founded the Holocaust Survivors Film Project with Laurel Vlock.

This organization is the predecessor to the Fortunoff Video Archive for Holocaust Testimonies – the world’s first archive of testimonies of Holocaust survivors, witnesses and bystanders recorded on video. The Fortunoff Video Archive provides guidance for documentation teams taking testimonies in other communities impacted by human rights abuses throughout the world.

Based on his experience as an interviewer of hundreds of survivors and as a testimony researcher, he developed an interview technique revolving around a concept of emphatic listening that helps witnesses deliver their testimony as a way of dealing with trauma, although this can be a painful and traumatic process in itself.

== Early life ==
Laub was born into a Jewish family in Cernăuți, in Bukovina, Romania (today, Ukraine), where he received an Orthodox Jewish education. His father, Moshe Laub, was a merchant. In 1940, Dori and his parents were sent to the Carieră de piatră (Romanian for "stone quarry") concentration/labor camp in Transnistria. Thanks to the ingenuity of his mother Klara, Dori and his parents managed to hide themselves while the Nazis liquidated the camp and sent its inhabitants to their deaths. They were then sent to a large Jewish ghetto in the town of Obodivka. Toward the end of the war, they moved around from camp to camp, and Dori and his mother lost contact with his father, who did not survive the war.

In April 1944, Dori and his mother returned to his city of birth and the home of his mother's parents, who survived the war. In 1950, he immigrated to Israel with his mother. After spending one and a half years in an immigrant camp and the Tira refugee absorption camp (ma`abara), they moved to Haifa. In 1955, Laub began studying medicine at The Hebrew University of Jerusalem’s Hadassah Medical School, where he completed his studies in 1962. He was then enlisted in the IDF, where he served as a medical officer in the Golani Brigade's 51st Battalion. In 1965 he was discharged and spent one year working at a psychiatric hospital in Acre.

In 1966, he travelled to the United States to undertake advanced studies in psychiatry and psychoanalysis, during which he taught at the Harvard University Medical School and completed a two-year residency at the Austen Riggs Center. In 1969 he joined the Western New England Institute for Psychoanalysis and the faculty of Yale University’s Department of Psychiatry, where he became a clinical professor in 2004.

=== Research on testimony and trauma ===
In 1973, Laub returned to Israel to take part in the Yom Kippur War, during which he treated soldiers suffering from shell shock, or combat stress, on the northern front. Laub recognized that many of the Israeli soldiers who suffered from shell shock during the war were first and second generation Holocaust survivors. In the course of the war, he began to formulate his unique approach to trauma as manifested in time and space, in different events, and between generations.

In 1979, in cooperation with documentary filmmaker and television producer Laurel Vlock, he established the world's first sustained project to record Holocaust survivors on video: the Holocaust Survivors Film Project. The first 183 recordings for this project were deposited at Yale University Library in 1981, laying the cornerstone for the Fortunoff Video Archive for Holocaust Testimonies, which over the years has assembled more than 4,400 testimonies regarding more than 30 communities across the United States, South America, Europe, and Israel.

The archive made it possible to research the social, cultural, and historical significance of personal audiovisual testimonies regarding the Holocaust and other traumatic historical events. Additional testimony archives pertaining to the Holocaust and other humanitarian tragedies were established in its wake, including the Shoah Foundation (Steven Spielberg’s testimony collection project) and archives documenting the massacres in Rwanda and Bosnia.

In 1992, in collaboration with literary scholar Shoshana Felman, Laub wrote and published Testimony: Crises of Witnessing in Literature, Psychoanalysis and History, in which, based on his experiences as an interviewer of hundreds of witnesses, he analyzes the role of the listener of testimony. According to Laub, delivering testimony is a delicate process in which the listener encourages the witness but at the same time is cautious to avoid pushing him or her to recount memories that may result in emotional collapse. Testimony, Laub maintains, enables individuals to organize traumatizing experiences that caused them emotional injury into words and memories, to process the pain, and to contend with the horror while sharing it and calling for historical justice.

Twenty years after he began collecting testimonies, and ten years after formulating his approach to the role of the listener, Laub took the discourse of testimony one step further by interviewing Holocaust survivors who had been hospitalized in institutions for the mentally ill in Israel. In his eyes, their broken stories of emotional injury were the most distinctive testimony of the trauma they endured.

Over the years, Laub worked with psychiatric and emotional trauma patients in psychiatric wards and in a private clinic. He wrote dozens of articles and chapters in books dealing with different aspects of trauma, testimony, and the Holocaust.

Laub was the father of two children, and his second wife was Johanna Bodenstab (1961-2015), who was also a scholar of the Holocaust. He lived in Woodbridge, Connecticut in the northeastern United States, where he died at the age of 81.

== Honors, awards, and membership in professional organizations ==
- 1962 – The Sigmund Freud Prize for MD Theses for the best psychiatric dissertation
- 1975 – Member of the American Psychiatric Association
- 1978 – Member of the American Association of Directors of Residency Training
- 1983 – Member of the American Psychoanalytic Association
- 1985 – Fellow, American Psychiatric Association
- 1988 – Member of the Society for Traumatic Stress Studies
- 1990 – Member of the American Medical Association
- 1991 – Special citation by Governor Lowell Weicker for work done for the video archive for Holocaust testimonies at Yale University.
- 2003 – Distinguished Fellow, American Psychiatric Association
- 2004 - The Elise M. Hayman Award for the Study Of The Holocaust and Genocide

== Publications ==
=== Selected articles ===
- "Holocaust Survivors: Adaptation to Trauma", Patterns of Prejudice, 13(1) (1979): 17-25.
- "Truth and Testimony: The Process and the Struggle", American Imago, 48(1) (1991): 75-91.
- "The Empty Circle: Children of Survivors and the Limits of Reconstruction", Journal of the American Psychoanalytic Association, 46(2) (1998): 507-529.
- "Introduction" to the English-Language edition of S. Graessner, N. Gurris and C. Pross (eds.), At the Side of Torture Survivors: Treating a Terrible Assault on Human Dignity (Baltimore: The Johns Hopkins University Press, 2001).
- “Testimonies in the Treatment of Genocidal Trauma,” Journal of Applied Psychoanalytic Studies, 4(1) (2002): 63-87.
- “September 11, 2001: An Event without A Voice,” in J. Greenberg (ed.), Trauma at Home (Lincoln, NE: University of Nebraska Press, 2003), 204-215.
- “Traumatic Shutdown of Narrative and Symbolization: A Death Instinct Derivative?” Contemporary Psychoanalysis, 41 (2005): 307-326.
- “The Rwanda Genocide: A Kaleidoscope of Discourses Heard from a Psychoanalytic Perspective,” Psyche: Zeitschrift für Psychoanalyse und ihre Anwendungen, 59 (2005): 106-124.
- “From Speechlessness to Narrative: The Cases of Holocaust Historians and of Psychiatrically Hospitalized Survivors,” Literature and Medicine, 24(2) (2005): 253-265.
- “Re-establishing the Internal ‘Thou’ in Testimony of Trauma,” Psychoanalysis, Culture & Society, 18 (2013): 184-198.
- “Listening to My Mother’s Testimony,” Contemporary Psychoanalysis, 51 (2015): 195-215.

=== Books ===
- Shoshana Felman and Dori Laub, Testimony: Crises of Witnessing in Literature, Psychoanalysis and History (New York: Routledge, 1992).
- Dori Laub and Andreas Hamburger (eds.), Psychoanalysis and Holocaust Testimony: Unwanted Memories of Social Trauma (New York: Routledge, 2017).
