= Barbara Johnson (literary critic) =

American literary critic and translator (1947 – 2009)

Barbara Ellen Johnson (October 4, 1947 – August 27, 2009) was an American literary critic and translator, born in Boston. She was a professor of English and Comparative Literature and the Fredric Wertham Professor of Law and Psychiatry in Society at Harvard University. Her scholarship incorporated a variety of structuralist and poststructuralist perspectives—including deconstruction, Lacanian psychoanalysis, and feminist theory—into a critical, interdisciplinary study of literature. As a scholar, teacher, and translator, Johnson helped make the theories of French philosopher Jacques Derrida accessible to English-speaking audiences in the United States at a time when they had just begun to gain recognition in France. Accordingly, she is often associated with the "Yale School" of academic literary criticism.

== Early life ==
Barbara Johnson was born in Boston, Massachusetts, the only daughter of Gilbert and Priscilla (James) Johnson. She graduated from Westwood High School in 1965, attended Oberlin College from 1965 to 1969, and completed a Ph.D. in French at Yale University in 1977. Her graduate studies occurred during the emergence of the "Yale School," a group of literary critics that included Johnson's thesis director, Paul de Man. The Yale School's characteristic integration of structuralist and poststructuralist theory into the study of literature became an essential feature of Johnson's approach to criticism.

She was awarded a Guggenheim Fellowship in 1985 for French Literature.

== Overview of major works ==
In her 1990 essay, "Writing" (in Critical Terms for Literary Study), Johnson outlines the importance of theory to analyses of literature. She argues that the history of writing (l'écriture) is an important philosophical, political, and psychoanalytical concept in twentieth-century French thought. She posits French theorist Roland Barthes' appropriation of Ferdinand de Saussure's concept of the sign—encompassing both a "signifier" and a "signified"—as the foundation of his theory that language is a "structure," a system of relations governed by a set of rules. Johnson then goes on to describe the central roles played by Derrida and psychoanalyst Jacques Lacan in destabilizing Barthes' account of the relation between signifier and signified and the "structure" of language. Following Derrida, Johnson argues that reading is not the task of grasping the true single meaning of a text, but of grasping its multiple meanings, which are often unstable and contradictory. This polysemy has allowed feminist and marginalized readers to enter texts at the locations where the author tries to "dominate, erase, or distort" the various "other" claims that are made through language and reassert their identities.

=== The Critical Difference ===
In The Critical Difference (1980), Johnson argues that any model of difference as a polarized difference "between entities (prose and poetry, man and woman, literature and theory, guilt and innocence)" is necessarily founded upon "a repression of differences within entities" (pp. x-xi). In this book, Johnson explores how the unknown and the unknowable function in a text. The "unknown" to which she refers is not something concealed or distant, but a fundamental unknowability that constitutes and underlies our linguistic cognition.

In one of the articles in The Critical Difference, "Melville's Fist: The Execution of Billy Budd," Johnson reads Herman Melville's novel as a performance of the irreconcilability between the "signifier" and the "signified." She argues that if a description could perfectly describe its referent and actually "hit" its intended object (just as Billy Budd hits and kills John Claggart), the result would be the annihilation of that object. Language, thus, can only function upon imperfection, instability, and unknowability.

=== A World of Difference and The Feminist Difference ===
Johnson's next book, A World of Difference (1987), reflects a move away from the strictly canonical context of her analyses in The Critical Difference. Johnson wants to take her investigation beyond "the white male Euro-American literary, philosophical, psychoanalytical, and critical canon" that dominates the academy as a whole and her work in particular. But she also calls the "sameness" of that white Euro-American literary and critical tradition into question, undertaking a thorough interrogation of its boundaries. In addition, Johnson expands the scope of her literary subjects to include black and/or women writers, such as Zora Neale Hurston, Dorothy Dinnerstein, James Weldon Johnson, and Adrienne Rich. Her subsequent collection, The Feminist Difference (1998), offers a continued critique of the terms in play throughout feminism's history and an examination of the differences within and between feminisms.

=== The Wake of Deconstruction ===
The Wake of Deconstruction (1994) approaches the general state of deconstruction in light of the backlash it faced over the course of the 1980s and early '90s. Through the double lenses of Paul de Man's posthumous Nazi collaboration scandal and the academic community's reaction to the murder of feminist legal theorist Mary Joe Frug, Johnson discusses allegory, feminism, and the misinterpretation of deconstruction.

== The problematics of language ==
=== The question of translation ===
In "Taking Fidelity Philosophically" (in Difference in Translation), Johnson describes translation as an ultimately impossible endeavor because the "mother" or original language is already, intrinsically untranslatable from signifier to signified. The more one attempts to translate a work into comprehensibility, the more likely one is to stray from its original ambiguity. Jacques Derrida, with his thoughts on différance, elucidates the complicating but necessary fact of language: that it is foreign to itself. Every attempt to translate sets the language against itself, creating new tensions as it progresses. Translation, though impossible, is also necessary, as it is precisely these tensions that constitute language.

=== Deconstruction, indeterminacy, and politics ===
Throughout her work, Johnson emphasizes both the difficulty of applying deconstruction to political action and of separating linguistic contradictions, complexities, and polysemy from political questions. In A World of Difference, she makes a turn to a "real world," but one which is always left in quotation marks—"real," but nonetheless inseparable from its textual, written aspect. In a chapter of the book entitled, "Is Writerliness Conservative?" Johnson examines the political implications of "undecidability" in writing, as well as the consequences of labeling the poetic and the undecidable as politically inert. She writes that, if "poetry makes nothing happen," poetry also "makes nothing happen"—the limits of the political are themselves fraught with political implications. Harold Schweizer writes in his introduction to The Wake of Deconstruction that "if interpretive closure always violates textual indeterminacy, if authority is perhaps fundamentally non-textual, reducing to identity what should remain different, Johnson's work could best be summarized as an attempt to delay the inevitable reductionist desire for meaning".

=== Prosopopoeia and anthropomorphism ===
In "Apostrophe, Animation, and Abortion" (in A World of Difference) and "Anthropomorphism in Lyric and Law" (in Persons and Things), Johnson discusses the recurrence of rhetorical figures of prosopopoeia (an address to a dead or absent person) and anthropomorphism (conferring human attributes on a nonhuman entity) within contemporary disputes about abortion, corporate personhood, and other debates surrounding who or what qualifies as a person. "Apostrophe" juxtaposes Romantic poets such as Percy Bysshe Shelley with twentieth-century poems by Gwendolyn Brooks, Lucille Clifton, and Adrienne Rich that deal with women's experiences following abortion. Johnson argues that the analogy between creative writing and giving birth, traditionally employed by male poets like Sidney and Jonson, re-appears in a distorted fashion in women's writing. Johnson's concern with prosopopoeia represents an ongoing elaboration of Paul de Man's work, extending the problems posed in his essays "Autobiography as De-Facement" and "Anthropomorphism and Trope in Lyric" (in The Rhetoric of Romanticism) to feminist and African-American literature.

== Death ==
Johnson was diagnosed with cerebellar ataxia in 2001. She continued to write and advise graduate students until her death in 2009.

== Publications ==
=== Selected works ===
- Persons and Things (Cambridge: Harvard University Press, 2008)
- Mother Tongues: Sexuality, Trials, Motherhood, Translation (Cambridge: Harvard University Press, 2003)
- "Using People: Kant with Winnicott," in The Turn to Ethics, ed. Marjorie Garber, Beatrice Hanssen, and Rebecca L. Walkowitz (New York: Routledge, 2000) (reprinted in Persons and Things)
- "Anthropomorphism in Lyric and Law," in the Yale Journal of Law and the Humanities, 10 Yale J.L. & Human. 549 (Summer 1998) (reprinted in Persons and Things)
- "Moses and Intertextuality: Sigmund Freud, Zora Neale Hurston, and the Bible," in Poetics of the Americas, ed. Bainard Cowan and Jefferson Humphries (Baton Rouge: Louisiana State University Press, 1997)
- The Feminist Difference: Literature, Psychoanalysis, Race and Gender (Cambridge: Harvard University Press, 1998)
- The Wake of Deconstruction (Oxford: Blackwell, 1994)
- "Writing," in Critical Terms for Literary Study, ed. Frank Lentricchia and Thomas McLaughlin (Chicago: University of Chicago Press, 1990)
- A World of Difference (Baltimore: Johns Hopkins University Press, 1987)
- "Taking Fidelity Philosophically," in Difference in Translation, ed. Joseph F. Graham (Ithaca: Cornell University Press, 1985)
- The Critical Difference: Essays in the Contemporary Rhetoric of Reading (Baltimore: Johns Hopkins University Press, 1980)
- Défigurations du langage poétique: La seconde révolution baudelairienne (Paris: Flammarion, 1979)
- "The Frame of Reference: Poe, Lacan, Derrida," in Yale French Studies, no. 55/56 (1977): pp. 457–505 (reprinted in The Purloined Poe, 1988)

=== Edited volumes and projects ===
- The Norton Anthology of Theory and Criticism, Principal ed., Vincent B. Leitch, with William E. Cain, Laurie A. Finke, John McGowan, and Jeffery J. Williams (New York: Norton, 2001)
- Freedom and Interpretation: The Oxford Amnesty Lectures, 1992 (New York: Basic Books, 1993)
- Consequences of Theory: Selected Papers from the English Institute, 1987-1988, ed. with Jonathan Arac (Baltimore: Johns Hopkins University Press, 1990)
- A New History of French Literature, Principal ed., Dennis Hollier (Cambridge: Harvard University Press, 1989)
- Yale French Studies, No. 63, "The Pedagogical Imperative: Teaching as a Literary Genre" (1982)

=== Translations ===
- Stéphane Mallarmé, Divagations (Cambridge: Harvard University Press, 2007)
- Jacques Derrida, Dissemination (Chicago: University of Chicago Press, 1981)
- Philippe Sollers, "Freud's Hand," in Yale French Studies, No. 55-56 (1979)
- Jacques Derrida, "Fors: The Anglish Words of Nicolas Abraham and Maria Torok," in the Georgia Review, No. 31 (1977)

== See also ==
- List of deconstructionists
