= Fortunoff Video Archive for Holocaust Testimonies =

- Formation: 28 June 1979; 47 years ago
- Location: Sterling Memorial Library, Yale University, New Haven, Connecticut
- Website: www.library.yale.edu/testimonies/
- Formerly called: Holocaust Survivors Film Project

The Fortunoff Video Archive for Holocaust Testimonies is a collection of recorded interviews with witnesses and survivors of The Holocaust, located at Yale University in New Haven, Connecticut. Approximately 4,400 videotaped interviews are deposited with the Yale University Library and housed in Sterling Memorial Library.

The archive pioneered the usage of video testimonies to record eyewitness accounts of major historical events. It has served as the primary inspiration for video testimony projects documenting other state-sanctioned crimes against humanity and their aftermaths.

== History ==
The antecedents for the establishment of the archive was a meeting between Laurel Vlock, a television journalist at WTNH News 8 of Connecticut, and Dori Laub, a child Holocaust survivor and New Haven psychiatrist. In May 1979, the two arranged for a professional video crew to film the Holocaust testimonies of four survivors. Recognizing the extraordinary impact of these stories, Vlock and Laub were determined to do more. They partnered with William Rosenberg, the president of the local chapter of the Farband, a labor Zionist organization, which had many Holocaust survivors among its members. On 28 June 1979, the Holocaust Survivors Film Project (HFSP) was formally launched. Geoffrey Hartman, a professor of English and comparative literature at Yale, was also one of the key founding members. His wife, Renée, was one of the first four survivors taped.

Shortly thereafter, Vlock received a commitment from WNEW-TV of New York City to air a documentary based on the testimonies. The resulting work, Forever Yesterday, won a regional New York Emmy Award in 1980 for "Outstanding Discussion/Interview Program." By 1981, Laub and Vlock had collected 183 testimonies under the auspices of HFSP and formally deposited them at Yale University.

In 1987, Mr. Rosenberg, representing the HSFP, transferred the original 183 testimonies from a deposit at Yale to a permanent donation. That year, the collection was also renamed the Fortunoff Video Archive for Holocaust Testimonies, in recognition of a generous endowment gift provided by Alan A. Fortunoff, head of Fortunoff.

In the 1990s, the Fortunoff Archive achieved greater international recognition. In 1990, composer Steve Reich's piece, Different Trains, which incorporated soundbites from the Fortunoff testimonies, won a Grammy Award for best contemporary classical composition. Lawrence Langer's acclaimed 1991 book, Holocaust Testimonies: The Ruins of Memory, was based on the author's eight years of viewing and studying the archive's testimonies. It was named one of the ten best books of the year by The New York Times Book Review and also received the National Book Critics Circle Award under the "Criticism" category. The 1995 centennial issue of The New York Times Book Review listed Holocaust Testimonies as one of the hundred most important books of the century. The Fortunoff testimonies also served as a basis for Witness: Voices from the Holocaust, a critically acclaimed documentary that was nationally broadcast by PBS on Yom HaShoah (Holocaust Remembrance Day) in May 2000.

In February 2011, Yale University Library began digitizing the Fortunoff Archive's more than 4,400 testimonies, scheduled to be completed in 2014. The professional format on which the testimonies were originally recorded is obsolete because the analog decks are no longer manufactured. Digitization is essential for preservation.

== Impact ==
The Fortunoff Archive pioneered the usage of video testimonies to record eyewitness accounts of major historical events. Prior to the existence of the Archive, researchers relied on audio and written testimonies. The Archive has served as the primary inspiration for video testimony projects documenting the Cambodian genocide, ethnic cleansing in the former Yugoslavia and other crimes against humanity.
