= Thomas Bain (Orange) =

British intelligence officer

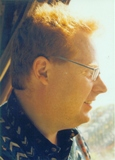
Thomas Bain in Puskar, India, 2002

Thomas R. W. Bain (born c. 1964) is known for intelligence work done behind the Iron Curtain in 1988 under the pseudonym "Orange". He is currently a dean at the International School of Project Management in New Delhi, India.

== Early life ==
Bain was born in London. He lived Kingston upon Thames attending prep school at Highfield School (Liphook, Hampshire). He has dyslexia, and made slow progress in the educational system. In 1982 he moved to Spain, and took up Hispanic Studies in a small private college in Salamanca where he met up with friends of Golo Mann. Upon return to France he qualified for the Classe préparatoire aux grandes écoles. He accomplished his Khâgne in the Lyceé Jules Ferry. The same year he discovered a new archeological area at Les Baux-de-Provence. He accomplished his BA Humanities in the radical Paris Nanterre University. He completed M.Phil. at the Geneva-based IUEE (Institute for European Studies), and later attended the doctoral seminars of Wlad Godzich in the University of Geneva.

== April 1988 ==
The students of the IUEE (as above), sympathising with many of the faculty in exile, organised two study tours of the Soviet Union. The first one went to Kyiv and Moscow, the second to Budapest and Prague. He attended both. The tour of the Ukraine gave him insight into the degree of hostility vis-à-vis Moscow, and the signs of dissidence in the leadership of the Komsomol. In Moscow, a student from the highest school of politics and administration leaked the shape of the army: suicides and an organizational incapacity. Moving on to Budapest, the dissent was quite open, and Bain saw the opportunity of a break-apart of the Communist Block. In a meeting with the then dissident Professor Géza Jeszenszky the option of letting East Germans out of Hungary was discussed as a means of bringing the Wall down. Bain also met with FIDESZ leaders, and learned that recently NGOs in Hungary were allowed to be financed internationally, an open door for the West to finance dissident organisations. He went to Prague to meet leaders of the democratic opposition, in an underground Café called "U Kafku" and further discussed the plan of letting East Germans through Czechoslovakia into Hungary. He was followed in Prague by the police, and in a jest of defiance took them on a 14 kilometre walk around Prague. On his return to the Europa Hotel, the receptionist called him into the lift and explained that the police had been through his belongings. He had to leave. Bain escaped from Prague due to an InterRail pass, he was able to get into a train without buying a ticket (he would have been noticed at the ticket counter). On the train, stooges noticed him but it was too late; the train had already crossed the border into Germany. In Munich, he was hidden by a friend for 5 days, while the German television showed pictures of him as accused of common crimes of murder in Czechoslovakia. He escaped from Munich thanks to former Hungarian exiles, in a freight compartment, then from Zurich to Geneva in a toilet compartment. On arriving in Geneva he went to the house of Professor Dusan Sidjanski. Here he discussed all the plans of the dissidence to bring down the Wall, and subsequently hid for a month in a flat in neighbouring France, in Annemasse. His research report signed with the pseudonym "Orange" was shared with Emile Noel, Secretary General of the European Commission. It was also shared with the UK Foreign and Commonwealth Office (FCO), as well as the US Central Intelligence Agency (CIA). It is said to be one of the key documents that alerted the West of changes in the East, and triggered of a change in their foreign policy towards the East and Central Europe just a year and a half before the Wall falling.

== Pro-European militancy ==
In the summer of 1991, Bain led a group of young European enthusiasts from different European Union (EU) Member States during a 2-day meeting in Romainmôtier, Switzerland on the theme "An EU Constitution". The same year he initiated a process in the Budapest University of Economic Sciences (Currently Corvinus University of Budapest) that led to the attribution of a Doctorate Honoris Causa (see Honorary degree) to the President of the EU Commission Jacques Delors (attributed in 1994). He is a member of the UK European Movement and the French Mouvement Européen. He has taken part in the UK Liberal Democrats Brussels Chapter, and has been a close friend of UK Deputy Prime Minister Nick Clegg during his European years. In 1993, as shadow director projects for Fidesz, in the Hungarian Ministry of Interior, he revised the firstly refused Hungarian application for the EU. His draft was approved by both the EU Parliament and the EU Commission, paving the way for an accession to the EU for Hungary in the first round of enlargement of the EU. At the same time, Bain has been a public opinion maker in Hungary, with a series of articles published in the Budapest Sun, and the Budapest Week. He has held several postings with the European Commission, including as a diplomat in New Delhi, India.

== Alternative activism ==
Bain's alternative action started after seeing the film "Gandhi" in Madrid at the age of 18. He had a Basque companion, and befriended the Basque cause. In the early eighties he took part in the Aberri Eguna nationalist demonstrations, in despite serious deterrence by the Spanish Guardia Civil. His basque friends used to call him "la naranja" (because of his orange hair), from which his nickname emerged. He subsequently went to Kreuzberg, Berlin, the heart of alternative Germany. This is where he got a first sight of the Wall, and a first taste for the underground exchanges between the East and the West.

Bain was militant in the French Lycée system, and as délégué sat on two school boards (Conseils d'établissement). In 1988, Bain took the French Ministry of Education to court for discrimination on the ground of nationality after his refusal to take the CAPES (secondary school teachers' exam). He won his case in 1992 under European law, opening the secondary school exams to foreign European nationals in France and several other countries of the EU.

In 1991, out of idealism, he set up the trainee's newsletter "Le Piston" (nepotism) in the European Commission, and denounced several scandals. For this, he was tortured by the French Direction de la surveillance du territoire (DST) for more than two hours. The "Piston", which lasted for 4 years, is considered by the grapevine in Brussels to be one of the elements that forced the European Commission to adopt a reform including contractual and financial control over all expenditures.

In the same 1991 he left for Budapest where he founded the Rugby club the Budapest Exiles RFC.

== Dyslexia ==
As soon as 1988 he realised to potential of IT for people with dyslexia, in particular the possibility of correcting himself before printing. In 1991–1992 he worked with Microsoft managers in Budapest to determine how to create grammar correctors in Microsoft Word. Bain established the relationship between a database structure of language rules (encoded), and the scientific structural linguistic approach developed in Nanterre University. The matter was taken up as a research project in Harvard University, and finally when it came to be in MS Word, the grammar corrector logic enabled Microsoft to also improve the spelling correctors.

== Scholarship ==
Whilst in the last year of high school, Bain attended the post-graduate seminars of the literary critic Lucette Finasse in the "Collège International de Philosophie" in Paris. Later on he joined the group of young Spanish language scholars that surrounded Golo Mann in the later years of his life, and stayed regularly in Golo Mann's country residency in Berzona, Switzerland.
