= Friedrich Ulfers =

Professor of German at New York University

Friedrich Ulfers (1934 – 2026) was a Professor of German at New York University. He was a distinguished fellow, having been awarded several honors from New York University. He also served as the dean of the media and communications division at the European Graduate School in Saas-Fee, where he conferred Master's and Ph.D. degrees to students. He has written as a literary critic and a philosopher.

== Career ==
Ulfers was born in Giessen, Germany, in 1934. He immigrated to New York, New York, where he attended college. He received a Bachelor of Arts from the City College of New York in 1959, a master's degree in 1961 from NYU, and a Ph.D. from NYU in 1968.

Ulfers began teaching at NYU in 1982 and has worked with EGS since its conception. He has been chair to a Nietzsche Conference at NYU, chair to a special session on Günter Grass for the Modern Language Association, as well as chair to a session on autobiographical writings at Hofstra University.

Ulfers served numerous administrative functions, such as the NYU's German department director of undergraduate studies, director of the NYU in Berlin summer program in the department of global affairs and director of the Deutsches Haus at NYU.

On 15 March 2007, Ulfers was appointed dean of the media and communications division at the EGS, in the place of Wolfgang Schirmacher.

Ulfers has written on a variety of subjects, such as German romanticism, the novel in the 20th century, philosophy at the turn of the century, and post-structuralism as well as deconstruction.

Ulfers retired from NYU in 2023 after 62 years of service. He died in 2026.

== Works ==
- (2006) Ulfers, Friedrich. Times Square as an Exemplar of Postmodern Urban Space. Toward a New Metropolitanism: Reconstituting Public Culture, Urban Citizenship, and the Multicultural Imaginary in New York and Berlin. Ed. Friedrich Ulfers, Gunter Lenz, and Antje Dallmann. Heidelberg: Universitätsverlag, 251–60.
- (2005) Ulfers, Friedrich. "Nietzsche's Amor Fati - The Embracing of an Undecided Fate." Accepted for publication in Poiesis - A Journal of the Arts and Communication.
- (2004) Ulfers, Friedrich. "Nietzsche's Ontological Roots in Goethe's Classicism." in: Nietzsche and Antiquity: His Reaction and Response to the Classical Tradition. Ed. Paul Bishop. Boydell & Brewer Ltd (UK).
- (2003)Ulfers, Friedrich. "Von der Skepsis zur Utopie: Musils Idee des 'Essaysismus'" in: Skeptizismus und literarische Imagination. Ed. Bernd Hüppauf and Klaus Vieweg. Wilhelm Fink Verlag.
- (2002) Ulfers, Friedrich. "Nietzsche's Idea of 'Bildung.'" in: Poiesis: A Journal of the Arts and Communication. 4 (2002): 30–36.
- (2002) Ulfers, Friedrich. "Friedrich Nietzsche as a Bridge from 19th Century Atomistic Science to the Process Philosophy of 20th Century Physics, Literature, and Ethics." in: Philological Papers (West Virginia University) 49: 21–29.

== Prize ==
The annual Friedrich Ulfers Prize, established in 2013, honors "a leading publisher, writer, critic, translator, or scholar who has championed the advancement of German-language literature in the United States."

== See also ==
- List of deconstructionists
