= Paulo Cesar Duque-Estrada =

Brazilian philosopher

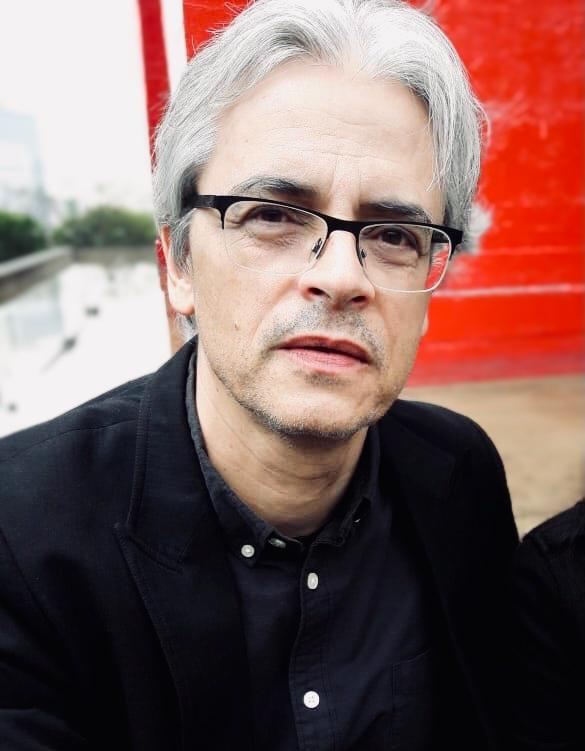
- Born: November 22, 1956 (age 69); Rio de Janeiro, Brazil

Education
- Education: Pontifical Catholic University of Rio de Janeiro; Boston College; New School for Social Research

Philosophical work
- Region: Western philosophy
- School: Continental philosophy
- Institutions: Pontifical Catholic University of Rio de Janeiro; State University of Northern Rio de Janeiro
- Main interests: Phenomenology; Hermeneutics; Deconstruction

Paulo Cesar Duque-Estrada (born November 22, 1956) is a Brazilian philosopher. He is a Professor of Contemporary Philosophy and Associate Vice-President for Academic Affairs (Graduate Programs and Research) at the Pontifical Catholic University of Rio de Janeiro (PUC-Rio). He has served as executive secretary (2010–2011), vice-president (2011–2012) and president (2012–2013) of the National Forum of Associate Vice-Presidents for Research and Graduate Programs (FOPROP).

He is an expert in Continental philosophy, and his research revolves around Heidegger, Gadamer, Levinas and Paul Ricoeur. A leading interpreter of the philosophy of Jacques Derrida, he was the first scholar to bring Derridean thought to the field of philosophy within the academic environment in Brazil.

== Early life and education ==
Born in Rio de Janeiro, he is the great-grandson of Joséphine Bouju, French nurse assistant to Jean-Martin Charcot, and grandson of journalist and politician Generoso Ponce Filho, owner of the Brazilian branch of RKO Pictures.

He received both his B.A. and M.A. from PUC-Rio, and his Ph.D. from Boston College. Later, as a visiting scholar, he developed a post-doctoral research on the subject of hermeneutics and deconstruction at the New School for Social Research, New York.

== Work ==
Duque-Estrada has published extensively on topics related to ethics, language, subjectivity and other contemporary socio-political issues. A frequently invited lecturer and speaker at several institutions such as Södertörn University, Birkbeck, University of London, Bonn University, Fordham University, Concordia University, among others, he is also actively involved in promoting and strengthening ties between post-graduate research and governmental and non-governmental funding agencies.

In 2002 he founded, along with a group of diverse researchers from various academic backgrounds, the NEED- Núcleo de Estudos em Ética e Desconstrução, dedicated to transdisciplinary research in Deconstruction.

== Selected bibliography ==
- Studies in Hermeneutics and Deconstruction / Estudos em Hermenêutica e Desconstrução (Edufpi ed.). 2021.
- Heidegger and the Ontological Reading of Praxis / Heidegger e a Leitura Ontológica da Praxis (Edufpi ed.). 2021.
- Ethical-Political Studies on Derrida / Estudos Ético-Políticos sobre Derrida (Mauad ed.). 2020.
- Thinking Beyond the Paradigm of Vision / Pensar para Além do Paradigma da Visão (Fênix ed.). 2020.
- Following Other Paths: in Response to Simon Blackburn's "Past Masters of the Postmodern" (Inference-International Review of Science ed.). 2019.
- On History, Ghosts and Ontology (Contexto Internacional ed.). 2019.
- Extension of the Realm of Evil: Heidegger and Metaphysics / Extensão do Domínio do Mal: Heidegger e a Metafísica (UFJF ed.). 2019.
- Archive and Politics in Jacques Derrida / Arquivo e Política em Jacques Derrida (Cortez ed.). 2018.
- Beyond Lies and Truth in Politics / Para Além da Mentira e da Verdade na Política (maisdeum ed.). 2018.
- Marx and the Thought of Being: on a Derridean Reading / Marx e o Pensamento do Ser: sobre uma leitura Derrideana (PUCRJ ed.). 2015.
- On Eyes and Hands: Art and the "Letting Be" in Heidegger and Derrida / Dos Olhos e das Mãos: Arte e "Deixar Ser" em Heidegger e Derrida (EBA-UFRJ ed.). 2012.
- Observations on the so-called "Death of the Author" / Observaçōes sobre a chamada "morte do autor" (Sinais Sociais ed.). 2010.
- On the Fictionality of Language / Sobre a Ficcionalidade da Linguagem (Companhia de Freud ed.). 2008.
- Derrida's Specters / Espectros de Derrida (Nau ed.). 2008.
- Science and Post-Representation: Notes on Heidegger / Ciência e Pós-Representação: Notas sobre Heidegger (UFPB ed.). 2006.
- Derrida and the Heideggerian Critique of Humanism / Derrida e a Crítica Heideggeriana do Humanismo (Liberdade ed.). 2005.
- Deconstruction and Ethics: Echoes of Jacques Derrida / Desconstrução e Ética: Ecos de Jacques Derrida (Loyola ed.). 2004.
- Towards the Margins: on Derrida / Às Margens: a propósito de Derrida (Loyola ed.). 2002.
- Limits of the Heideggerian Inheritance: notes on Gadamer / Limites da Herança Heideggeriana: sobre Gadamer (Braga ed.). 2000.
- The Double Move of Philosophical Hermeneutics (Études Phénoménologiques, Louvain-La-Neuve ed.). 1997.

== See also ==
- List of deconstructionists
