= Thomas Baines (disambiguation) =

Thomas Baines (1820–1875) was an English artist and explorer.

Thomas Baines may also refer to:

- Thomas Baines (physician) (1622–1680), English physician
- Thomas Baines (journalist) (1806–1881), English journalist and historian
- Thomas Baines (Ontario) (1799–1867)

== See also ==
- Thomas Bain (disambiguation)
