= Geoffrey Hartman =

German-born American literary theorist

- Born: Geoffrey H. Hartmann; August 11, 1929; Frankfurt, Germany
- Died: March 14, 2016 (aged 86); Hamden, Connecticut, U.S.
- Education: Queens College, CUNY; Yale University
- Occupation: Literary critic
- Known for: Yale school, Fortunoff Video Archive for Holocaust Testimonies

Geoffrey H. Hartman (August 11, 1929 – March 14, 2016) was a German-born American literary theorist, sometimes identified with the Yale School of deconstruction, although he cannot be categorised by a single school or method. Hartman spent most of his career in the comparative literature department at Yale University, where he also founded the Fortunoff Video Archive for Holocaust Testimonies.

== Biography ==
Geoffrey H. Hartmann was born in Frankfurt am Main in Germany, in an Ashkenazi Jewish family. In 1939, he left Germany for England as an unaccompanied Kindertransport child refugee, sent away by his family to escape the Nazi regime. He came to the United States in 1946, where he was reunited with his mother, and later became an American citizen. Upon their arrival to the United States, his mother changed the family surname to "Hartman" to obscure its German origin.

Hartman attended Queens College, City University of New York and received his PhD from Yale. After appointments at the University of Iowa and Cornell in the 1950s, Hartman returned to Yale and was eventually made Sterling Professor of English and Comparative Literature at Yale University. One of his long-term interests was the English poet William Wordsworth.

His work explores the nature of the creative imagination, as well as the interrelationship of literature and literary commentary. He helped found the Fortunoff Video Archive for Holocaust Testimonies at Yale's Sterling Memorial Library, and lectured on issues dealing with the production and implications of testimony.

== Selected works ==
- The Unmediated Vision: An Interpretation of Wordsworth, Hopkins, Rilke, and Valéry (1954)
- André Malraux (1960)
- Wordsworth's Poetry, 1787-1814 (1964)
- Beyond Formalism: Literary Essays, 1958-1970 (1970)
- The Fate of Reading and Other Essays (1975)
- Akiba's Children (1978)
- Psychoanalysis and the Question of the Text: Selected Papers from the English Institute, 1976-77 (1978, editor)
- Criticism in the Wilderness: The Study of Literature Today (1980)
- Saving the Text: Literature/Derrida/Philosophy (1981)
- Easy Pieces (1985)
- Midrash and Literature (1986, editor)
- Bitburg in Moral and Political Perspective (1986, editor)
- The Unremarkable Wordsworth (1987)
- Minor Prophecies: The Literary Essay in the Culture Wars (1991)
- The Longest Shadow: In the Aftermath of the Holocaust (1996)
- The Fateful Question of Culture (1997)
- A Critic's Journey: Literary Reflections, 1958-1998 (1999)
- Scars of the Spirit: The Struggle Against Inauthenticity (2004)
- A Scholar's Tale: Intellectual Journey of a Displaced Child of Europe (2007)

== See also ==
- List of deconstructionists
