= Michael Wyschogrod =

German-American philosopher of religion and Jewish theologian (1928-2015)

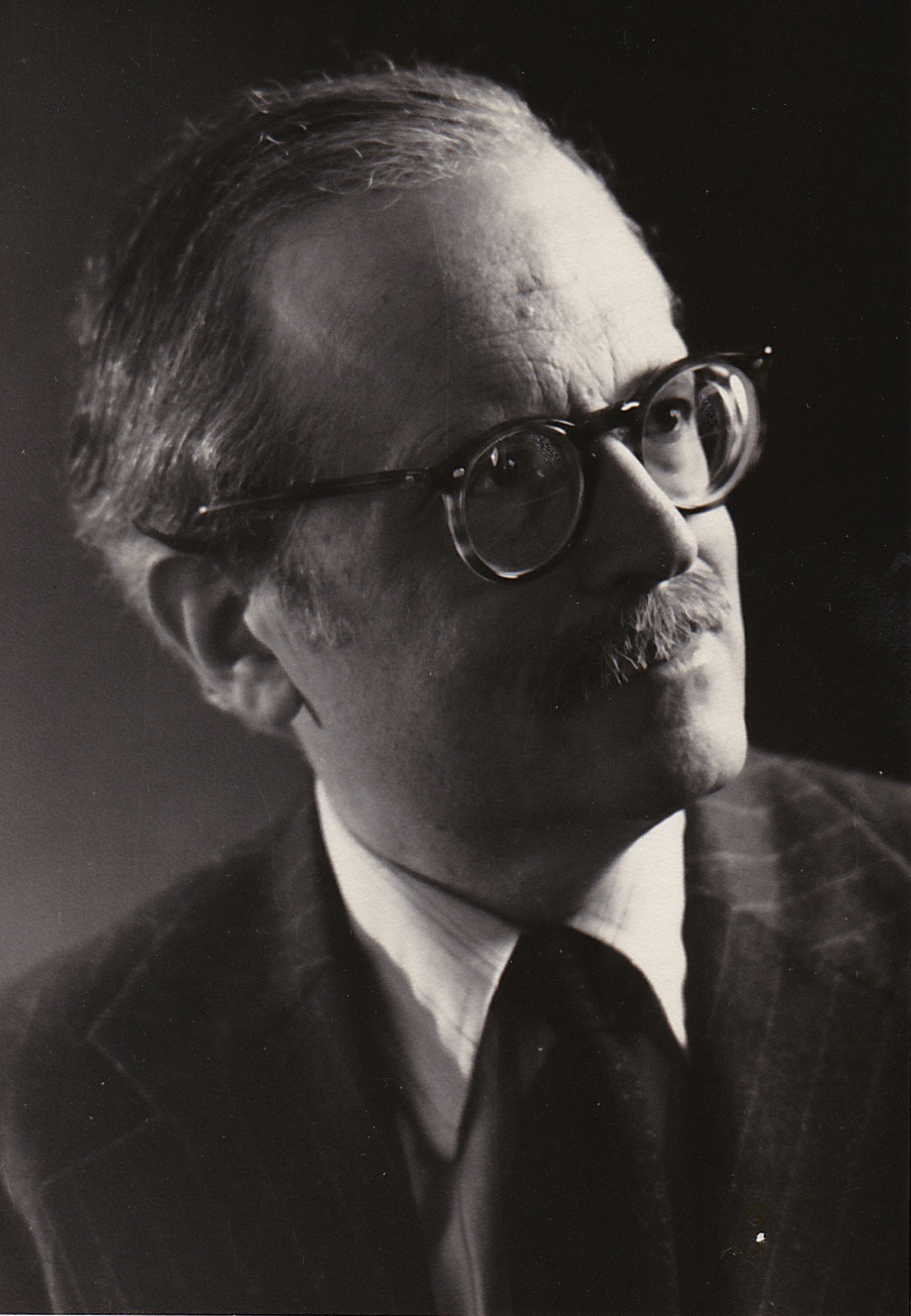
Michael Wyschogrod

Michael Wyschogrod (September 28, 1928 – December 17, 2015) was a Jewish German-American philosopher of religion, Jewish theologian, and activist for Jewish–Christian interfaith dialogue. During his academic career, he taught in philosophy and religion departments of several universities in the United States, Europe, and Israel.

== Early life ==
Michael Wyschogrod was born in Berlin, Germany, on September 28, 1928, the second child of Paul Wyschogrod and Margaret Ungar. His father, a Hungarian chess master who discouraged his son from pursuing this interest, had moved his family from Budapest to Berlin after the breakup of the Austro-Hungarian Empire a decade earlier. As a child, Wyschogrod spent summers in Budapest, visiting his maternal grandparents. The family fled Nazi Germany and arrived in the United States on July 3, 1939, when Wyschogrod was ten years old.

== Education ==
Wyschogrod associated himself with Modern Orthodox Judaism, a branch of Orthodox Judaism, and the schools he attended during childhood reflected Modern Orthodoxy's focus on integrating high-quality Jewish and secular education—a principle known as Torah Umadda. He attended the Orthodox Adas Yisroel school in Berlin and then, after emigrating to New York City in 1939, the Yiddish-speaking Yeshiva Torah Vodaas Jewish day school in Brooklyn, New York, from which he graduated high school in 1945. It was here that Wyschogrod studied under Rabbi Shlomo Heiman, from whom he came to appreciate "that part of the Torah that cannot be written down but transmitted only in the being of the person whose everyday conduct exemplifies it." Subsequently he studied Talmud with Rabbi Joseph B. Soloveitchik at Yeshiva University from 1946 to 1952.

He started his undergraduate studies in philosophy at City College of New York in 1946, developing an interest in Christian theology after reading Kierkegaard. He earned his BSS in 1949 and then went on to study philosophy at Columbia University, where he completed his PhD in 1953. His dissertation was published as Kierkegaard and Heidegger: the Ontology of Existence.

== Teaching career ==
Wyschogrod held teaching positions in philosophy at various higher education institutions throughout his career. He notably served as the chair of the philosophy department at Baruch College, which is part of the City University of New York system. In 1992, he was appointed a professor of religious studies at the University of Houston. Additionally, he served as a visiting professor at numerous universities across Israel, Europe, and the United States. These included Bar-Ilan University in Israel, renowned for integrating traditional Jewish studies with modern scholarship; the University of Bern in Switzerland, a leading center for theological research; and Yeshiva University in New York, a prominent institution for Jewish education and research.

== Thought ==
Wyschogrod's best-known book, The Body of Faith, deals with God's preferential love for the Jewish people and asserts that the election of Israel is corporeal in nature. The Hebrew Biblical notion of God's indwelling in the Jewish people, he argues, indicates that God is physically present among them. However, Wyschogrod argues, God's love for Israel does not preclude love for all humankind. Rather, election ties the Jewish people "to all men in brotherhood, as Joseph, favored by his human father, ultimately found himself tied to his brothers."

In much of his work, Wyschogrod concerned himself with the relationship between Judaism and Christianity, and he was active in Jewish-Christian theological dialogue. His book Abraham's Promise: Judaism and Jewish-Christian Relations makes an appeal for a new non-supersessionist Christian view of Judaism. If Judaism and Christianity are to have a stable and harmonious co-existence in the future, then Christianity must dispense with or, at the very least, not openly insist on a status for Judaism in which Judaism is considered an incomplete or antiquated religion.

At the same time, Wyschogrod urges Jews not to pursue a fallacious dismissal of the divinity of Jesus of Nazareth that operates on a priori grounds. In other words, while Jews should reject the divinity of Jesus, they should not do so by attempting to argue that God's incarnation in a human man is inconsistent with the teaching of the Hebrew Bible. On the contrary, he argues, there is much merit to the Christological position that posits "the indwelling of God in Israel by concentrating that indwelling in one Jew rather than leaving it diffused in the people of Jesus as a whole."

Even Wyschogrod's writing that focuses solely on Jewish theology could be said to show evidence of the importance of dialogue between Jewish and Christian theologies in his thought. His emphasis on the radical and sublime shock and force of God's choice to enter human history in and through the people of Israel, a unilateral and non-abrogable event, shows an affinity with the thought of the neo-orthodox Protestant theologian Karl Barth, whose work Wyschogrod considered relevant to Jewish theologians.

== Writings ==
Wyschogrod's best-known work is The Body of Faith: God in the People Israel (1989; 2nd edition: The Body of Faith: God and the People Israel). His Abraham's Promise: Judaism and Jewish-Christian Relations (2004) is a collection of some of his most seminal essays on Jewish-Christian relations from throughout his career.

== Personal life ==
Wyschogrod was married to the philosopher Edith Wyschogrod, and together they had two children.

== Legacy ==
Wyschogrod was described by Jonathan Sarna as "one of the premier Jewish theologians of our time," and by Rabbi Meir Soloveichik as "perhaps the most original Jewish theologian of the past half century."

Wyschogrod's archives are held at Seton Hall University.

== Works ==
=== Books ===
- —— (1954), Kierkegaard and Heidegger: The Ontology of Existence, Routledge & Kegan Paul Ltd
- ——; Berger, David (1978), Jews and Jewish Christianity, Ktav Publishing House
- —— (1983), The Body of Faith: God in the People Israel, Harper & Row, ISBN 978-006-069-706-8.
- —— (2004), Soulen, R. Kendall (ed.), Abraham's Promise: Judaism and Jewish-Christian Relations, Wm. B. Eerdmans, ISBN 978-080-281-355-8.

=== As editor ===
- ——; Thoma, Clemens, eds. (1987), Understanding Scripture, Paulist Press, ISBN 978-080-912-873-0.
- ——; Thoma, Clemens, eds. (1989), Parable and story in Judaism and Christianity, Paulist Press, ISBN 978-080-913-087-0.
