= Drucilla Cornell =

American philosopher

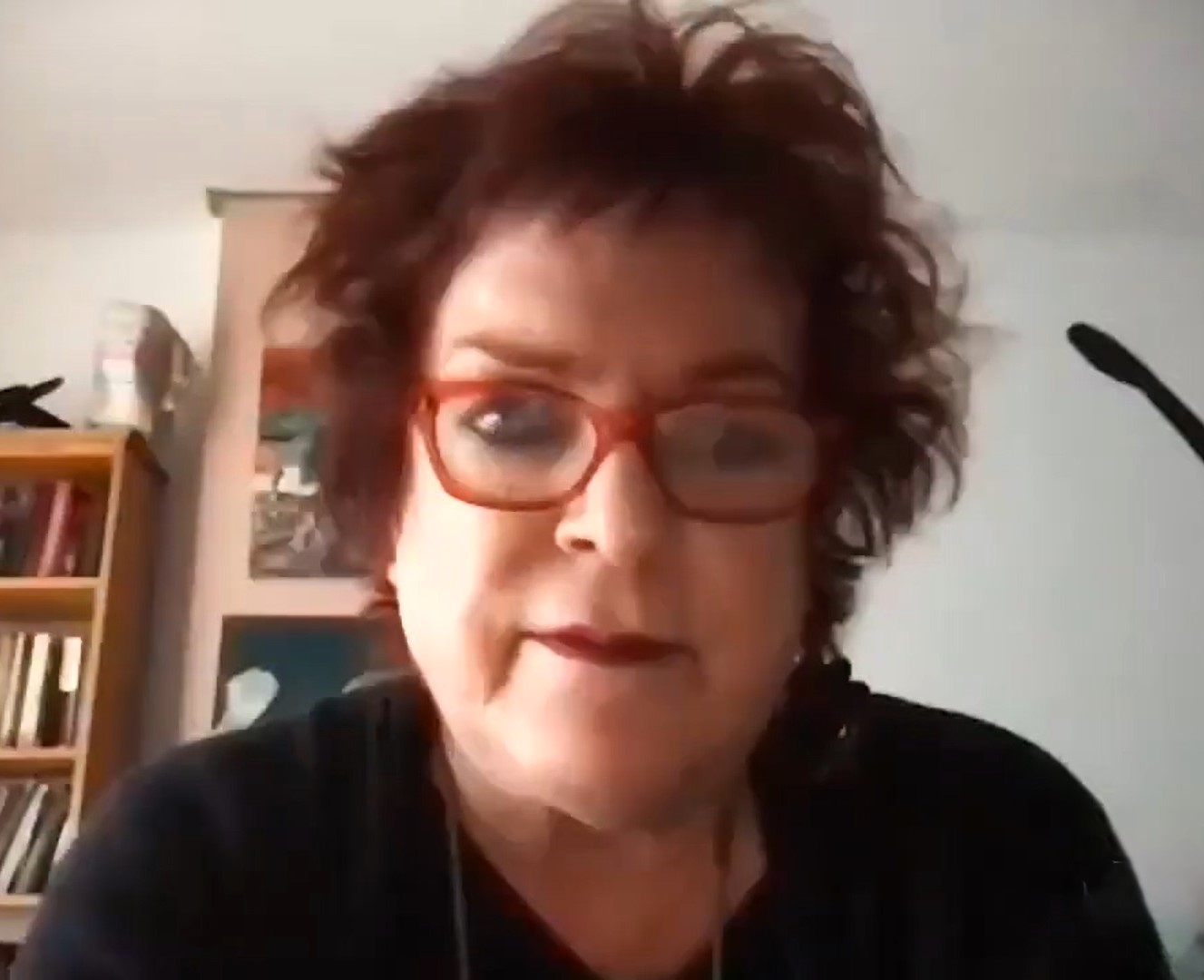
- Cornell in 2021
- Born: June 16, 1950; Los Angeles, California, U.S.
- Died: December 12, 2022 (aged 72); New York City, U.S.

Education
- Education: University of California Los Angeles School of Law

Philosophical work
- Era: Contemporary philosophy
- Institutions: Rutgers University
- Main interests: Feminist legal theory, deconstruction, critical theory, psychoanalytic theory, political philosophy

Drucilla Cornell (June 16, 1950 – December 12, 2022) was an American philosopher and legal theorist, whose work has been influential in political philosophy, ethics, deconstruction, critical theory, and feminism.

Cornell was an emerita Professor of Political Science, Comparative Literature and Women's & Gender Studies at Rutgers University, New Jersey; Professor Extraordinaire at the University of Pretoria, South Africa; and a visiting professor at Birkbeck College, University of London. She also taught for many years on the law faculties of the University of Pennsylvania and of Cardozo Law School of Yeshiva University.

== Education ==
She received her undergraduate education at Stanford University and Antioch College, where she earned a Bachelor of Arts (B.A.) in Philosophy and Mathematics in 1978. She then earned her Juris Doctor (J.D.) from University of California Los Angeles Law School in 1981.

== Career ==
All of Cornell's diverse work is dedicated to thinking the possibility of a more just future through political and legal philosophy, feminism, and critical theory. Cornell is perhaps best known for her numerous interventions into feminist legal philosophy: Beyond Accommodation: Ethical Feminism, Deconstruction and the Law (1991); Transformations: Recollective Imagination and Sexual Difference (1993); The Imaginary Domain: Abortion, Pornography and Sexual Harassment (1995); and At The Heart of Freedom: Feminism, Sex, and Equality (1998).

In these texts, Cornell moves beyond feminist debates over formal equality, sexuate rights, and essentialism to develop the original concepts of “ethical feminism” and “the imaginary domain,” which position feminism as a fundamentally ethical project oriented toward the re-imagination of sexual difference through law, politics and aesthetics. Cornell is also widely known for her highly influential work in deconstruction, most notably The Philosophy of the Limit (1992), in which she famously renames deconstruction “the philosophy of the limit,” and argues for the political and ethical significance of Jacques Derrida's work.

These attempts to rethink law and jurisprudence as the opening of the possibility of justice led Cornell to her later works: Just Cause: Freedom, Identity and Rights (2000); Defending Ideals: War, Democracy, and Political Struggles (2004); Moral Images of Freedom: A Future for Critical Theory (2008); and Symbolic Forms for a New Humanity: Cultural and Racial Reconfigurations of Critical Theory (co-authored with Kenneth Michael Panfilio, 2010). These texts draw upon feminist, race, and critical theory to argue for the importance of imagination and symbolic forms in the project of freedom, the preservation of dignity, and creating a new future for humanity.

Cornell's interest in the aesthetic is further brought out in Between Women and Generations: Legacies of Dignity (2004) and Clint Eastwood and Issues of American Masculinity (2009). In these texts she explores film and women's personal narrative as crucial sites for the aesthetic reconfiguration of what it means to be human, both individually and collectively.

Finally, Cornell's work in South Africa with the uBuntu Project has led to her most recent works uBuntu and the Law: African Ideals and Postapartheid Jurisprudence (co-edited with Nyoko Muvangua, 2011) and Law and Revolution in South Africa: uBuntu, Dignity and the Struggle for Constitutional Transformation (2014). Here, Cornell explores the role of indigenous values, especially uBuntu, in the law, politics and ethics of the new South Africa. This work in South Africa continues to build on Cornell's career-long project of reimagining law as a force of revolutionary ethical transformation by looking beyond the Euro-American intellectual tradition. Cornel West has described Cornell as “one of the last grand critical theorists of our time.”

== On deconstruction and the law ==
She played a key role in organizing the conference on deconstruction and justice at the Benjamin N. Cardozo School of Law in 1989, 1990, 1991 and 1993—a conference at which Jacques Derrida is thought by many to have made his definitive philosophical turn towards ethical thought.

== Playwriting ==
Her first play, produced in 1989, was a dramatic adaptation of Finnegans Wake which continues to be performed on Bloomsday. Her other plays, 'The Dream Cure', 'Background Interference', and 'Lifeline', have been produced in New York and other cities including Los Angeles, Atlanta, Boca Rotan, Florida, and Cape Town, South Africa. She also produced a documentary film on the African humanist ethic of uBuntu, entitled uBuntu Hokae.

== Imaginary domain ==
The imaginary domain is the legal and moral ideal that was named to protect the psychic space necessary to rework individual sexual difference, sexuate being, racialized and ethnic identifications, as well as any other complex fantasies of personhood.

Drucilla Cornell coined the phrase imaginary domain in the book by the same name in 1995. The phrase was originally intended to intervene in feminist debates that had become acrimonious about whether women or any other identity could appeal to established identities as the basis of right. Cornell argued that it was possible to defend a practical ideal of the imaginary domain without having to resolve these particular debates, since as a moral or legal right, it was the person who was given the imagined space to recreate and re-symbolize all of his or her identifications. Thus, the imaginary domain did not fall into notions of right as necessarily inscribing victim identities or states of injury, since at least at the level of fantasy, the person is protected as the site of her own identifying configurations.

== Work in South Africa ==
From 2008 to the end of 2009, Professor Cornell held the National Research Foundation Chair in Customary Law, Indigenous Values, and the Dignity Jurisprudence at the University of Cape Town, South Africa. She founded the uBuntu project in 2003, and continues to be the co-director of that project with Chuma Himonga.

She was also a co-director of the uBuntu Township Project, with Madoda Sigonyela. Professor Cornell was an advocate and researcher for Khulamani, an on the ground organisation of people who suffered under apartheid and struggled to find new and creative ways to counter the devastation that remains because of the system of racialized capitalism. The uBuntu Project published several books during her time on the project, including uBuntu and the Law: Indigenous Ideals and Postapartheid Jurisprudence and The Dignity Jurisprudence of the South African Constitutional Court.

== Labor activism ==
Her longtime concerns with inequality and worker rights began in the 1970s through her work as a union organizer, first in Silicon Valley semiconductor factories, followed by organizing both electronics and clerical workers in and around New York City. She wrote about those years in a 2020 publication, There Is Power in a Union: How I Became a Labor Activist. For nearly 25 years, she served as a founding member of the Board of Advisors of the Center for the Study of Labor and Democracy.

== Personal life ==
She is survived by her daughter, Sarita Cornell, her former husband, Gregory DeFreitas, both of New York City, her sister Jill Gwaltney and brother Brad Cornell, both of Southern California.

== Selected works ==
=== Books ===
- Benhabib, Seyla; Cornell, Drucilla, eds (1987). Feminism as Critique: On the Politics of Gender.
- Cornell, Drucilla; Carlson, David Gray; Rosenfeld, Michel, eds (1991). Hegel and Legal Theory.
- Cornell, Drucilla (1991). Beyond Accommodation: Ethical Feminism, Deconstruction and the Law. Routledge. ISBN 9780415901062.
- Cornell, Drucilla; Rosenfeld, Michel; Carlson, David Gray, eds (1992). Deconstruction and the Possibility of Justice.
- Cornell, Drucilla (1992). The Philosophy of the Limit.
- Cornell, Drucilla (1993). Transformations: Recollective Imagination and Sexual Difference.
- Benhabib, Seyla; Butler, Judith; Cornell, Drucilla; Fraser, Nancy (1995). Feminist Contentions: A Philosophical Exchange.
- Cornell, Drucilla (1995). The Imaginary Domain: Abortion, Pornography, and Sexual Harassment.
- Cornell, Drucilla (1998). At the Heart of Freedom: Feminism, Sex, and Equality.
- Cornell, Drucilla (2000). Just Cause: Freedom, Identity, and Rights.
- Cornell, Drucilla (2000). Feminism and Pornography.
- Cornell, Drucilla (2002). Between Women and Generations: Legacies of Dignity. ISBN 9780312294304.
- Cornell, Drucilla (2004). Defending Ideals: War, Democracy, and Political Struggles.
- Cornell, Drucilla (2007). Moral Images of Freedom: A Future for Critical Theory.
- Cornell, Drucilla (2009). Clint Eastwood and Issues of American Masculinity.
- Cornell; Drucilla; Barnard-Naude, Jaco; Du Bois, Francois, eds (2009). Dignity, Freedom and the Post-Apartheid Legal Order: The Critical Jurisprudence of Justice Laurie Ackermann
- Cornell, Drucilla; Panfilio, Kenneth Michael (2010). Symbolic Forms for a New Humanity: Cultural and Racial Reconfigurations of Critical Theory.
- Cornell, Drucilla; Muvangua, Nyoko, eds (2012). uBuntu and the Law: African Ideals and Postapartheid Jurisprudence.
- Cornell, Drucilla (2014). Law and Revolution in South Africa: uBuntu, Dignity, and the Struggle for Constitutional Transformation.
- Cornell, Drucilla; van Marle, Karin; Sachs, Albie (2014). Albie Sachs and Transformation in South Africa: From Revolutionary Activist to Constitutional Court Judge.
- Cornell, Drucilla; Seely, Stephen D. (2016). The Spirit of Revolution: Beyond the Dead Ends of Man.
- Cornell, Drucilla; Friedman, Nick (2016). The Mandate of Dignity: Ronald Dworkin, Revolutionary Constitutionalism, and the Claims of Justice
- Cornell, Drucilla; Jane Anne Gordon, eds. (2021). Creolizing Rosa Luxemburg
- Cornell, Drucilla (2022). Today's Struggles, Tomorrow's Revolution: Afro-Caribbean Liberatory Thought

=== Chapters in books ===
- Cornell, Drucilla (2005), "Feminism, utopianism, and the role of the ideal in political philosophy", in Cudd, Ann E.; Andreasen, Robin O. (eds.), Feminist theory: a philosophical anthology, Oxford, UK Malden, Massachusetts: Blackwell Publishing, pp. 414–421, ISBN 9781405116619.

=== Open access online articles ===
- Politics of Grieving, by Drucilla Cornell, Social Text, 2011

== See also ==
- List of deconstructionists
- Critical legal theory
- The imaginary domain
