= Clemens Thoma =

Swiss theologian

Clemens Thoma SVD (November 2, 1932 – December 7, 2011) was a Swiss theologian.

He was professor of theology and Jewish studies and founder of the Institute for Jewish-Christian Studies (IJCF) at the University of Lucerne.

He grew up as one of eleven children in a family in the Canton of St. Gallen. After theological studies at St. Augustin near Bonn and St. Gabriel in Vienna, he was ordained a priest. At the University of Vienna, he studied Judaism under Kurt Schubert.

As part of his research Thoma undertook a systematic approach to present Rabbinic parables to New Testament scholars, for comparative purposes. In 1994 Thoma received the Buber-Rosenzweig-Medal. Hayim Perelmuter stated that Thoma's work on the Rabbinic parables "adornes the world of scholarship".

== Works ==
=== Books ===
- Thoma, Clemens (1980). A Christian Theology of Judaism. Studies in Judaism and Christianity. New York: Paulist Press. ISBN 9780809123100. OCLC 6918632.

=== As editor ===
- ———; Wyschogrod, Michael, eds. (1987). Understanding Scripture: explorations of Jewish and Christian traditions of interpretation. Studies in Judaism and Christianity. New York: Paulist Press. ISBN 9780809128730. OCLC 15081789.
- ———; Wyschogrod, Michael, eds. (1989). Parable and story in Judaism and. Studies in Judaism and Christianity. New York: Paulist Press. ISBN 9780809130870. OCLC 19922103.

== Sources ==
- German Wikipedia
