= Karin de Boer =

Dutch professor of philosophy (born 1965)

- Born: 1965 (age 60–61)

Academic background
- Education: University of Amsterdam (PhD)
- Thesis: Denken in het licht van de tijd. Heideggers tweestrijd met Hegel (Thinking in the Light of Time: Heidegger's Encounter with Hegel) (1997)
- Doctoral advisor: T. de Boer and L. Heyde
- Influences: Hegel, Derrida

Academic work
- Era: 21st-century philosophy
- Region: Western philosophy
- School or tradition: Continental
- Institutions: Katholieke Universiteit Leuven (KU Leuven)
- Main interests: Post-Kantian philosophy
- Website: https://www.kuleuven.be/wieiswie/en/person/00034230

Karin Gwenda de Boer (born 1965) is a Dutch Professor of Philosophy at the Katholieke Universiteit Leuven (KU Leuven). She is known for her works in modern philosophy and contemporary continental philosophy. Her main areas of research are Kant's theoretical philosophy and German Idealism, including works on Hegel, Heidegger and Derrida's thought.

== Books ==
- Thinking in the Light of Time: Heidegger's Encounter with Hegel (State University of New York Press, 2000)
- On Hegel: The Sway of the Negative (Palgrave Macmillan, 2010)
- Kant's Reform of Metaphysics: The Critique of Pure Reason Reconsidered (Cambridge University Press, 2020)

=== Edited ===
- Conceptions of Critique in Modern and Contemporary Philosophy (Palgrave, 2011)
- The Experiential Turn in Eighteenth-Century German Philosophy (Routeledge, 2021)

=== Articles ===
- Kant's Multi-Layered Conception of Things-in-Themselves, Transcendental Objects, and Monads (Kant-Studien 2014)
- Categories versus Schemata: Kant's Two-Aspect Theory of Pure Concepts and his Critique of Wolffian Metaphysics (JHP 2016)
- Kant's Response to Hume's Critique of Pure Reason (Archiv für Geschichte der Philosophie, 2019)

== See also ==
- Deconstruction
- Being and Time
