= Shoshana Felman =

American literary critic

- Education: University of Grenoble (Ph.D.)
- Occupations: Professor, writer
- Employer: Emory University
- Known for: literary critic and theorist
- Awards: Chevalier de l'ordre des palmes academiques (awarded by French government in 1982), American Academy of Arts and Sciences Fellow (2010).
- Website: Official website

Shoshana Felman is an American literary critic and current Woodruff Professor of Comparative Literature and French at Emory University. She was on the faculty of Yale University from 1970 to 2004, where in 1986 she was awarded the Thomas E. Donnelly Professorship of French and Comparative Literature. She specializes in 19th and 20th century French literature, psychoanalysis, trauma and testimony, and law and literature. Felman earned her Ph.D. at the University of Grenoble in France in 1970.

== Work ==
Felman works in the fields of psychoanalytic literary criticism, performativity theory, feminism, Holocaust testimony, and other areas, though her writings frequently question, ironize, or test the limits of the very critical methods being employed. Often in her writing a reversal will occur so that the critical vocabulary gets subjected to and converted into the terms of the literary or cultural object being scrutinized rather than simply settling the meaning of the object; thus in Felman's style of criticism there is no fixed hierarchy of theory over and beyond the reach of the literary object. As such, her methods share an affinity with deconstruction, for which she is sometimes associated with the Yale School and colleagues such as Paul de Man.

Jacques Lacan is a significant influence on Felman and she was among the vanguard of theorists—and perhaps foremost among those addressing Anglophone audiences—to rigorously apply his concepts to the study of literature.

Since the 1990s Felman has written texts on testimony and trauma, particularly in the context of the Holocaust and other collective trauma.

== Bibliography ==
- The Claims of Literature: The Shoshana Felman Reader, ed. by Emily Sun, Eyal Peretz, Ulrich Baer, Fordham University Press, 2007
- The Juridical Unconscious: Trials and Traumas in the Twentieth Century, Harvard University Press, 2002
- What Does a Woman Want? Reading and Sexual Difference, Johns Hopkins University Press, 1993
- Testimony: Crises of Witnessing in Literature Psychoanalysis and History (co-authored with Dori Laub, M.D.) (1992)
- Jacques Lacan and the Adventure of Insight: Psychoanalysis in Contemporary Culture (1987)
- Editor, Literature and Psychoanalysis: The Question of Reading–Otherwise (1982)
- Le Scandale du corps parlant. Don Juan avec Austin, ou la Séduction en deux langues (1980), translated as The Literary Speech Act. Don Juan with Austin, or Seduction in Two Languages (1984), reissued as The Scandal of the Speaking Body. Don Juan with Austin, or Seduction in Two Languages (2002)
- Writing and Madness: Literature/Philosophy/Psychoanalysis (1985), reissued with added materials and interviews (2003)
- La Folie et la chose littéraire (1978)
- La "Folie" dans l'oeuvre romanesque de Stendhal (1971).
