= Wlad Godzich =

- Godzich in 1999
- Born: 13 May 1945 (age 81); Germany
- Education: Ph.D., Columbia
- Occupation: Academic
- Writing career
- Genre: Literary theory
- Subjects: Emergent literature Globalization and culture European integration
- Notable works: The Culture of Literacy; Theory and History of Literature Series; The Emergence of Prose: An Essay in Prosaics

Wlad Godzich (Władysław Bogusz Godzich, Wladyslaw Bogusz Godzich) (born 13 May 1945 in Germany, raised in France) is a literary critic, literary theorist, translator, and scholar. He is attributed with influencing the conceptualization of modern literary critical theory. He served as Professor of general and comparative literature, and critical studies at the University of California, Santa Cruz until 2022.

== Career ==
Godzich has published and translated several books, edited eight collections of essays, and authored over a hundred scholarly articles, lectures, and papers. In 2000, Godzich joined the University of California, Santa Cruz as dean of Humanities. Prior to this, he was Professor of English (Chair of Emergent Literatures), Comparative Literature, and European Studies at the University of Geneva and professor of Comparative literature at Université de Montréal. He has also held visiting appointments at the University of Silesia (Poland), the Catholic University of Rio de Janeiro (Brazil), Harvard University, and the University of Zurich.

At the University of Minnesota, he was the director of the Office of Research Development, director of the comparative literature program, director of the Center for Humanistic Studies, and coordinator of their international program in Dakar, Senegal.

Organizer of dozens of international conferences, he also acts as consultant to many university presses and organizers of university programs in the Americas and Europe. He sits on the editorial board of multiple American, European and Asian journals, both print and electronic. His research grants have been primarily from US, Canadian, Swedish, Swiss and private agencies.

== Work in the 1980s ==
Through his work at the University of Minnesota Press, Godzich brought important works of critical theory into English translation. His essays during this period were well received by critics as they were among the first to link deconstruction, cultural criticism, and third-world literatures through linguistics:

they can now be seen as tesserae composing a theoretical mosaic of remarkable scope. The patterns of his thought emerge from his interest in the relationship between language and literacy-the latter conceived as "a determinate set of relations that we have to language." Godzich reinvigorates the semiological project proposed by Saussure but forsaken by his heirs: that of exploring the social functioning of language in its historical and rhetorical actualizations.

== Selected works ==
- The Emergence of Prose: An Essay in Prosaics (Minnesota, 1987; ISBN 978-0-8166-1572-8)
- Philosophie einer un-europäischen Literaturkritik (Fink, 1989)
- Crisis of Institutionalized Literature in Spain (Minnesota, 1991; ISBN 978-0-8166-2010-4)
- The Culture of Literacy (Harvard University Press, 1994; ISBN 978-0-674-17954-7)

== See also ==
- Critical theory
- Literary theory
- New Historicism
- Yale school (deconstruction)
- Tzvetan Todorov
- Paul de Man
