= Hugh J. Silverman =

American philosopher and cultural theorist

Hugh J. Silverman (August 17, 1945 – May 8, 2013) was an American philosopher and cultural theorist whose writing, lecturing, teaching, editing, and international conferencing participated in the development of a postmodern network. He was executive director of the International Association for Philosophy and Literature and professor of philosophy and comparative literary and cultural studies at Stony Brook University (New York, US), where he was also affiliated with the Department of Art and the Department of European Languages, Literatures, and Cultures. He was program director for the Stony Brook Advanced Graduate Certificate in Art and Philosophy. He was also co-founder and co-director of the annual International Philosophical Seminar since 1991 in South Tyrol, Italy. From 1980 to 1986, he served as executive co-director of the Society for Phenomenology and Existential Philosophy. His work draws upon deconstruction, hermeneutics, semiotics, phenomenology, aesthetics, art theory, film theory, and the archeology of knowledge.

== Biography ==
Silverman was born in Boston, Massachusetts. He received his doctorate from Stanford University (1973) with a Fulbright -French Government Scholarship to France (1971-71) and an FASCEA Scholarship in Paris (1968). After teaching at Stanford for a year, he joined the Stony Brook University Philosophy faculty in 1974 (with a joint title appointment in comparative literature).

He was awarded the inaugural Fulbright-Distinguished Chair in the Humanities at the University of Vienna (Austria) for 2000-01 and the Fulbright-Distinguished Chair in Art Theory and Cultural Studies at the Vienna Academy of Fine Arts in 2009–10, as well as an Institute for Advanced Study Distinguished Fellowship at Michael J. Osborne Centre Institute for Advanced Study at La Trobe University (Melbourne, Australia) for June–July 2008. He was honored with the Helsinki Medal by the Rector of the University of Helsinki (Finland) in 1997 and was visiting senior fellow at the Institute for the Human Sciences (Vienna, Austria) in 1998. He received the State University of New York Chancellor's Award for Excellence in Teaching and was awarded an American Council of Learned Societies (NEH) Fellowship in 1980–81.

From 1980, he held visiting professorships at the University of Warwick and the University of Leeds (UK), University of Milan, University of Torino and University of Rome-Tor Vergata (Italy), University of Vienna and University of Klagenfurt (Austria), University of Helsinki and University of Tampere (Finland), University of Sydney and University of Tasmania in Hobart (Australia), University of Trondheim (Norway), and University College, Cork (Ireland), University of Nice (Faculte des Lettres)(France).

Silverman died in Long Island, after suffering from cancer.

== Intellectual links ==
Professor Silverman wrote and taught particularly in the areas of continental philosophy, aesthetics, postmodern ethics, and cultural / art / film / social theory. His work builds upon the writings of Maurice Merleau-Ponty, Jacques Derrida, Mikel Dufrenne, Roland Barthes, Michel Foucault, Jean-François Lyotard, and is in dialogue with contemporary figures such as Julia Kristeva, Gianni Vattimo, Mario Perniola, and Carlo Sini. His writings draw upon the philosophies of Friedrich Nietzsche, Edmund Husserl, Martin Heidegger, Hans-Georg Gadamer, and Paul Ricoeur.

== Publications ==
Silverman published more than 25 books and over 100 articles and book chapters, and delivered over 400 invited lectures in North and South America, Europe, Scandinavia, Singapore, Estonia, Australia, Korea, and Taiwan.

His authored books include:

- Textualities: Between Hermeneutics and Deconstruction (Routledge, 1994), translated into German by Erik M. Vogt as Textualitäten: Zwischen Hermeneutik und Dekonstruktion (Turia + Kant, 1997), into Italian by Paolo Cappelletti as Testualità tra ermeneutica e deconstruzione with an introduction to the Italian Reader (Spirali, 2003), and Korean (2009) under the title of Textualities: Between Philosophy and the Arts.
- Inscriptions: After Phenomenology and Structuralism (Routledge and Kegan Paul, 2nd ed., Northwestern University Press, 1997 ).

His more than twenty-three edited and co-edited books in English, German, Spanish, and Korean include studies of Merleau-Ponty, Derrida, Sartre, Piaget, Žižek, hermeneutics, deconstruction, and postmodern theory. He is also known for his published translations and editions of Merleau-Ponty's writings into English.

As Editor of the Routledge Continental Philosophy series, volumes are both edited and introduced by professor Silverman. Book titles include:

- (1988/1997) Philosophy and Non-Philosophy since Merleau-Ponty
- (1989) Derrida and Deconstruction
- (1990) Postmodernism—Philosophy and the Arts
- (1991) Gadamer and Hermeneutics
- (1994) Questioning Foundations: Truth / Subjectivity / Culture
- (1998) Cultural Semiosis: Tracing the Signifier
- (2000) Philosophy and Desire
- (2003) Lyotard: Philosophy, Politics, and the Sublime

His published articles include:

- “Re-Reading Merleau-Ponty”. Telos 29 (Fall 1976). New York: Telos Press.
- "'Wenn ich Fremder bin, gibt es keine Fremden:' Reflexionen über postmoderne Fremde," trans. Daniel Weidner, Psychoanalyse und Philosophie, Mitteilung des Instituts für Wissenschaft und Kunst, 51. Jahrgang, no. 1 (1996), 10–16.
- "Modernism and Postmodernism," Encyclopedia of Philosophy (Supplement). New York: Macmillan, 1996.
- "Postmodernismi Ja Elokuva: Roskaelokuvissa Econ ja Derridan kanssa," trans. Anita Seppä, Synteesi: Taiteidenvälisen Tutkimuksen Aikakauslehti [Finland] (3, 1997), 89–97.
- "La scrittura avanti lo scrivere," trans. Alessandro Carrera. Intersezioni: Rivista di storia delle idee (Anno XIX, Dec. 1999), 417–420.
- "Le posmodernisme comme modernite 'fin de siecle' (ou: Le posmodernisme aux fins de l' 'in-difference')," trans. Arnaud Villani, Revue de Metaphysique et de Morale [Special Issue: Philosophie Americaine Contemporaine], (Octobre-Decembre: No. 4, 2001), 67–78.
- "Living on (Borderlines): The Ethics of the Event of Lived Human Relations (Merleau-Ponty / Derrida)," Chiasmi International, 6 (2005), 273–284.
- "Respons-abilities --- Between Three," Archivo di Filosofia - 2006, ed. Marco Olivetti (Accademia Editoriale, 2006), 479–89.
- "Respons-abilities for Legacies: Jacques - on vous suit à travers vos textes," Mosaic: A Journal for the Interdisciplinary Study of Literature. Special Issue: Following Derrida: Legacies, Vol. 40, no 2 (June 2007), 297–306.
- "Tracing Responsibility: Levinas between Merleau-Ponty and Derrida," Journal of French Philosophy, Vol. 17, No. 1 (Spring 2007), 81–96.
- "Rückkehr der Postmoderne: Die Macht der Gespenster," trans. Sabine Malicha and David Ender, Corpus, Thema #11: SPECTERS°.°GESPENSTER, (October 2008), 17 pp.

=== Book series editor ===
In addition to the Routledge Continental Philosophy Series, he was editor of the Continuum Philosophy, Aesthetics, and Cultural Theory [PACT] Series, Humanity Books Philosophy and Literary Theory series and co-editor of the Humanity Books Contemporary Studies in Philosophy and the Human Sciences; he was also editor of the Rowman & Littlefield - Lexington Books New Frameworks for Continental Philosophy series and the IAPL Lexington Books TEXTURES: Philosophy / Literature / Culture book series.

Earlier series edited by professor Silverman with a number of published books in each include Contemporary Studies in Philosophy and Literature (SUNY Press) and the Philosophy. Literature, Culture Series (Northwestern University Press). As series editor, he published more than 50 books.

== See also ==
- American philosophy
- List of American philosophers
