= Edith Wyschogrod =

American philosopher

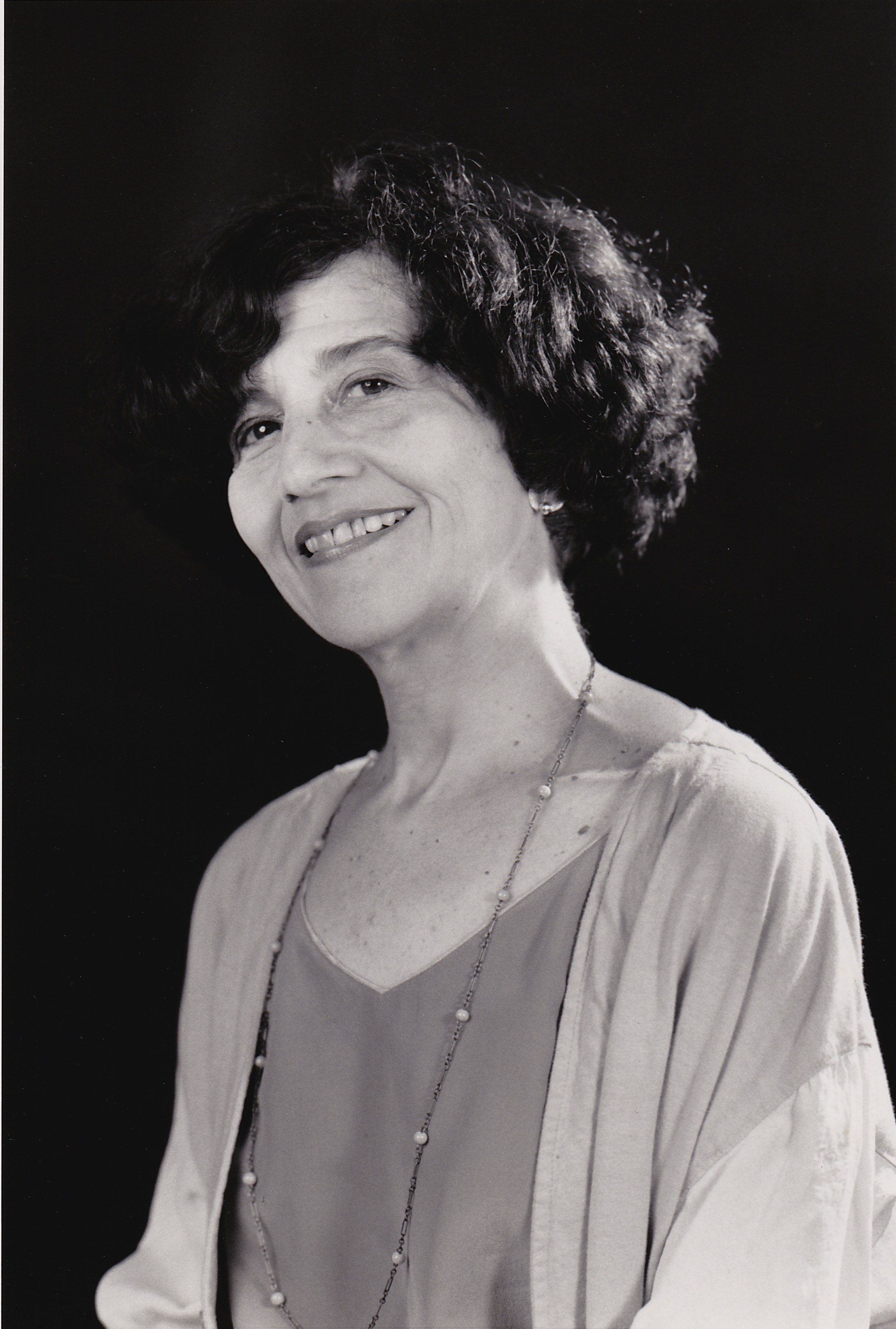
Philosopher Edith Wyschogrod

Edith Wyschogrod (June 8, 1930 – July 16, 2009) was an American philosopher. She received her B.A. from Hunter College in 1951 and her Ph.D. from Columbia University in 1970.

Wyschogrod joined Rice's Religious Studies Department in 1992, as the J. Newton Rayzor Professor of Philosophy and Religious Thought; she retired in 2002, and held the title of professor emeritus from 2003. Wyschogrod was a member of the American Academy of Arts and Sciences (Fellow, 1999), a Guggenheim Fellow (1995–1996), and a fellow of the National Humanities Center (1981). She served one term as president of the American Academy of Religion (1993).

She authored five influential books on ethics. Her work centered on ethical and philosophical themes such as justice and alterity; modern philosophy in light of technologically assisted mass death; and memory and forgetting.

She was the wife of philosopher Michael Wyschogrod. She died July 16, 2009, in New York City at the age of 79.

== Legacy ==
Wyschogrod's archives are held at Rice University.

== Books ==
Books authored

- Crossover Queries: Dwelling with Negatives, Embodying Philosophy's Others (New York: Fordham University Press, Spring 2006), 561 pp.
- Emmanuel Levinas: The Problem of Ethical Metaphysics (The Hague: Martinus Nijhoff, 1974), 222 pp.; second edition with new introduction (New York: Fordham University Press, 2000), 260 pp.
- An Ethics of Remembering: History, Heterology and the Nameless Others (Chicago: University of Chicago Press, 1998), 304 pp.
- Saints and Postmodernism: Revisioning Moral Philosophy (Chicago: University of Chicago Press, 1990), 300 pp.
- Spirit in Ashes: Hegel, Heidegger and Man Made Mass Death (New Haven: Yale University Press, 1985, pb. 1989), 247 pp.

Books edited

- The Ethical: Blackwell Readings in Continental Philosophy, co-edited with Gerald McKenny (London: Blackwell, 2002), 228 pp.
- The Enigma of Gift and Sacrifice, introduction and co-edited with Jean-Joseph Goux and Eric Boynton (New York: Fordham University Press, 2001), 186 pp.
- Lacan and Theological Discourse, co-edited with David Crownfield and Carl Raschke (Albany, NY: SUNY Press, 1989), 179 pp.
- The Phenomenon of Death: Faces of Mortality, edited with introduction and bibliography (New York: Harper and Row, 1973), 200 pp.

== Honors and awards ==
- Fellow, American Academy of Arts and Sciences, 1999–2009
- Guggenheim Fellow, 1995–1996
- President, American Academy of Religion, 1993
- Woodrow Wilson Fellow, Woodrow Wilson International Center for Scholars, September 1987, January 1988
- CUNY Faculty Research Travel Awards: summers 1982, 1983 (France, Germany, Italy); summer 1987 (France, Germany, Denmark, Norway); summer 1990 (France, Poland, Hungary, East Germany)
- Fellow, National Humanities Center, Research Triangle Park, North Carolina, January–June 1981
