= Yale school =

Group of literary critics

The Yale school is a colloquial name for an influential group of literary critics, theorists, and philosophers of literature that were influenced by Jacques Derrida's philosophy of deconstruction. Many of the theorists were affiliated with Yale University in the late 1970s, although a number of the theorists – including Derrida himself – subsequently moved to or became affiliated with the University of California, Irvine.

== Relationship to deconstruction ==
As a school of thought, the Yale School is more closely allied with the post-structuralist dimensions of deconstruction as opposed to its phenomenological dimensions. Additionally, the Yale School is philosophically affined to the 1970s version of deconstruction that John D. Caputo has described as a "Nietzschean free play of signifiers" and not the 1990s version of deconstruction that was far more concerned with political and ethical questions.

== Origins ==
During the period between the late 1960s and the early 1980s, Yale University was the home of a variety of thinkers who were indebted to deconstruction. The group included high-profile literary scholars such as Shoshana Felman, Paul de Man, Geoffrey Hartman, J. Hillis Miller, and Harold Bloom. This group came to be known as the Yale School and was especially influential in literary criticism because de Man, Miller, Hartman and Bloom are all considered to be prominent literary critics. The four critics listed above, along with Derrida, contributed to an influential anthology, Deconstruction and Criticism. However, Harold Bloom's position was always somewhat different from that of the rest of the group, and he later distanced himself from deconstruction.

== Book summaries ==
=== Deconstruction and Criticism (1979) ===
In his introduction to Deconstruction and Criticism, Hartman draws a distinction between Derrida, Miller, and de Man on the one hand, and himself and Bloom on the other. The former category he refers to as "boa-deconstructors" who pursue deconstruction to its utmost conclusions and who are more philosophically rigorous in their writings.

Hartman claims that both himself and Bloom are "barely deconstructionists" and that they "even write against it on occasion." Hartman claims that his writing style in particular is more reliant on the traditional role of pathos as a fundamental impetus for literary language. In contrast, deconstruction as advocated by Derrida seeks to reveal that the very notion of pathos is caught up in the rhetorical play which is endemic to language.

== Selected readings ==
- (1973) “Speech and Phenomena” and Other Essays on Husserl’s Theory of Signs, Jacques Derrida
- (1976) Of Grammatology, Jacques Derrida
- (1978) Writing and Difference, Jacques Derrida
- (1979) Deconstruction and Criticism
- (1981) Dissemination, Jacques Derrida
- (1981) Positions, Jacques Derrida
- (1982) Allegories of Reading: Figural Language in Rousseau, Nietzsche, Rilke, and Proust, Paul de Man
- (1983) On Deconstruction: Theory and Criticism after Structuralism, Jonathan Culler
- (1983) The Yale Critics: Deconstruction in America, Jonathan Arac, Wlad Godzich, Wallace Martin, editors.
- (1985) Rhetoric and Form: Deconstruction at Yale, Robert Con Davis and Ronald Schleifer, editors.
- (1989) Memoires for Paul de Man, Jacques Derrida
- (1992) Acts of Literature, Jacques Derrida
- (1994) The Wake of Deconstruction, Barbara Johnson

== Move to Irvine ==
After teaching at Yale from 1972 to 1986, J. Hillis Miller left for the University of California, Irvine, where he was the Distinguished Research Professor of English and Comparative Literature. He died in 2021.

Shortly after J. Hillis Miller's arrival at UC Irvine in 1986, Derrida himself became Professor of the Humanities at UCI. Derrida remained at UCI until 2003, one year before his death. Until his death, Derrida had slowly been turning over lecture manuscripts, journals and other materials to UCI's special collections library under an agreement he signed in 1990. After Derrida's death, his widow and sons said they wanted copies of UCI's archives shared with the Institute of Contemporary Publishing Archives in France. The university had sued in an attempt to get manuscripts and correspondence from Derrida's widow and children that it believed the philosopher had promised to UC Irvine's collection, although the suit was dropped in 2007.

The Irvine Langson Library Special Collections also houses the Paul de Man Papers, a collection of personal and professional papers documenting de Man's work in comparative literature.

== See also ==
- Jacques Derrida
- Paul de Man
- Shoshana Felman
- Harold Bloom
- Geoffrey Hartman
- J. Hillis Miller
- Deconstruction
- List of deconstructionists
- Différance
- Literary theory
- Metaphysics of presence
- New Criticism
- Yale University
