= Lee Edelman =

American literary critic and academic

- Born: 1953 (age 72–73)
- Education: Northwestern University; Yale University

Lee Edelman (born 1953) is an American literary critic and academic. He is a professor of English at Tufts University. He is the author of several books.

== Early life ==
Lee Edelman was born in 1953. He graduated with a Bachelor of Arts degree from Northwestern University, and he received an MA, MPhil, and PhD from Yale University.

== Career ==
Edelman began his academic career as a scholar of twentieth-century American poetry. He has since become active in the field of queer theory, exploring the intersections of sexuality, rhetorical theory, cultural politics, and film. At Tufts University, he holds an appointment as the Fletcher Professor of English Literature and has served as the Chair of the English Department.

He gained international recognition for his books about queer theory, post-structuralism, psychoanalytic theory, and cultural studies. His first book, Transmemberment of Song: Hart Crane's Anatomies of Rhetoric and Desire, is a critique of Hart Crane's poetry. His second book, Homographesis: Essays in Gay Literary and Cultural Theory, explores the significance of gay literature. His third book, No Future: Queer Theory and the Death Drive, is a post-Lacanian analysis of queer theory. He co-wrote Sex, or the Unbearable with Lauren Berlant. His fourth solo book, Bad Education: Why Queer Theory Teaches Us Nothing, rejects the Lacanian conception of education and instead pursues a different queer pedagogy.

Edelman's work has been contentious in queer theory, with José Esteban Muñoz's Cruising Utopia polemicizing against his "queer negativity" and rejecting Edelman's notion that the queer identity is already fixed. A 2005 Modern Language Association conference held a special symposium on the subject, with participants Robert L. Caserio, Lee Edelman, Jack Halberstam, José Esteban Muñoz, and Tim Dean debating the utility of the critique of reproductive futurism.

He was the co-founding editor of Duke University Press's Theory Q series in 2014, and remains a series editor.

== Personal life ==
Edelman is married to critic and English professor Joseph Litvak.

== Bibliography ==
=== Books ===
- Transmemberment of Song: Hart Crane's Anatomies of Rhetoric and Desire. Stanford University Press. 1987. ISBN 9780804714136.
- Homographesis: Essays in Gay Literary and Cultural Theory. New York: Routledge. 1994. ISBN 9780415902588.
- No Future: Queer Theory and the Death Drive. Durham, North Carolina: Duke University Press. 2004. ISBN 9780822333593.
- Sex, or the Unbearable. With Lauren Berlant. Durham: Duke University Press. 2014. ISBN 978-0-8223-5580-9.
- Bad Education: Why Queer Theory Teaches Us Nothing. Durham: Duke University Press. 2022. ISBN 978-1-4780-1597-0.

=== Selected articles ===
- "An Ethics of Desubjectivation?". differences. 27 (3). December 2016. doi:10.1215/10407391-3696679.
- "Learning Nothing: Bad Education". differences. 28 (1). May 2017. doi:10.1215/10407391-3821724.
