= Reproductive futurism =

Concept in queer theory and psychoanalysis

In queer theory and psychoanalysis, reproductive futurism is the concept that people place value over the future — such as having children — over their current situations. It was created by scholar Lee Edelman in his work No Future.

== Background and usage ==
Edelman created the term in the context of gay rights movements, which he saw as too culturally assimilationist. He criticised the marriage equality movement as placing inordinate value on marriage, procreation, and the traditional family model. Rather than accepting the criticism from conservatives that LGBT people cannot reproduce (and hence marriage is not something they deserve), gay rights activists argued that they were optimal parents and that they deserved marriage. For him, such movements should be abandoned, and LGBT people should embrace their place as symbolic of the death drive (a concept in psychoanalysis). His ultimate position was one of queer negativity. He created a related concept, the sinthomosexual – LGBT people who reject reproductive futurism and embrace the death drive.

Scholar Stephen Guy-Bray writes that the theory of reproductive futurism is essentially a critique of teleology, and that it can also be applied to valuing the present over the past.

Scholar Eithne Luibhéid expands on the theory of reproductive futurism to address the intersection between normative heterosexuality, race, and migration control through the figure of the pregnant migrant.
