= Clinical professor =

Academic appointment

Clinical professor, alternatively titled professor of (the) practice, is an academic appointment made to a member of a profession who is associated with a university or other academic body, and engages in practical (clinical) instruction of students (e.g., medical students, engineering students). Titles in this category may include clinical instructor, assistant clinical professor, associate clinical professor, and clinical professor.

Clinical professorship generally does not offer a "tenure track," but can be either full- or part-time, and is typically noted for its emphasis on practical skills training as opposed to theoretical matters. Thus, most members of such faculty are expected to have considerable practical experience in their respective fields of expertise. Unlike with most other faculty, this is deemed at least as important as educational credentials.

For administrative purposes, some universities classify such a designation as equivalent to "adjunct professor." Clinical professors may be salaried or may teach as a volunteer.

== North America ==
In the field of medicine, the usage of the terms (in ascending order of rank) clinical instructor, clinical assistant professor, clinical associate professor, and clinical professor (as opposed to the same titles without the clinical modifier) are not well standardized. In some institutions, clinical faculty may receive a designation of rank with the "clinical" modifier as a courtesy, often on the basis of involvement in education of medical (or other) students. In such a context, ascending rank may acknowledge seniority and/or reputation.

Medical faculty working full-time as an academic medical center with involvement in scholarly pursuits are typically assigned a rank without the clinical modifier of instructor, assistant professor, associate professor, or professor with or without tenure depending upon the institution. The assistant clinical professor position may be almost entirely honorary.

In Canada, doctors who teach are called "preceptors."

== Australia ==
The University of Sydney in Australia appoints "professors of practice".

== Examples of clinical professor ==
- Clinical Professor of Medicine
- Clinical Professor of Nursing
- Clinical Professor of Psychology
- Clinical Professor of Law
- Clinical Professor of Business
- Clinical Professor of Economics
- Clinical Professor of Pharmacy
- Professor of Professional Practice (various professional fields)
