= Charles Winquist =

American theologian

Charles Edwin Winquist
- Born: June 11, 1944; Toledo, Ohio, U.S.
- Died: April 4, 2002 (aged 57); Syracuse, New York, U.S.
- Known for: contributions in philosophy, theology and religion (e.g., modern and postmodern religion).
- Title: Thomas J. Watson Professor of Religion, Syracuse University

Academic background
- Education: University of Toledo; University of Chicago
- Influences: Friedrich Nietzsche, Jacques Derrida, Paul Tillich, Evangelos Christou, Robert W. Funk, Paul Ricoeur, Carl Jung, Sigmund Freud, James Hillman

Academic work
- Institutions: Syracuse University; California State University, Chico; Union College, Barbourville; YMCA Community College, Chicago
- Main interests: Associate Editor, Journal of the American Academy of Religion (1983–2002); Sub-network Editor, Religious Studies Review (1980–2002); Member, Board of Trustees, Scholars Press (1978–1985); Executive Director, American Academy of Religion (1978–1982)

Notes
- Exceptional Merit Service Award, California State University, Chico (1983); Professional Achievement Award, California State University, Chico (1982–1986); Outstanding Professor, California State University, Chico (1985).

Charles Edwin Winquist (June 11, 1944 – April 4, 2002) was the Thomas J. Watson Professor of Religion at Syracuse University, and is known for his writings on theology, contemporary continental philosophy and postmodern religion. Before he assumed his position at Syracuse University, he taught religious studies at California State University, Chico, from 1969 to 1986.

== Education ==
Winquist received his B.A. in philosophy from the University of Toledo (1965), his M.A. in theology from the University of Chicago (1968), and his Ph.D. in philosophical theology from the University of Chicago (1970).

== Philosophical and theological work ==
Winquist's work is tactical as well as theoretical, showing what kind of work theology can do in contemporary society. He suggests that theology is closely akin to what Gilles Deleuze and Félix Guattari refer to as a minor intensive use of a major language. The minor intensive theological use of language, Winquist argued, pressures the ordinary weave of discourse and opens it to desire. Thus theology becomes a work against "the disappointment of thinking".

In order to talk about God we need a deepened insight into insight.

— Charles E. Winquist
Epiphanies of Darkness

Unfortunately, contemporary religious thinking is often mired in disputes over the exact meaning of religion and theology. Serious groups generate ideas that, despite their best efforts, create conflicting interpretations that diminish, rather than improve, the philosophical, dialectical and social-scientific foundations of theology. These communities are not isolated groups of privileged theologians, but rather people across the world who experience their lives as meaningful and important. A minor intensive theological literature is not a "Sunday-school theology", as Winquist called it, but rather an effort to weave together daily discussions between the open spaces in communication. Communication makes everyday life divine, Winquist argued (citing Huston Smith). Smith called it divine ordinariness, which came from his understanding of Zen Buddhism. Theology acts on the everyday existence of the overriding secular discourse in communities.

=== Subversion and transcendence ===
The world's mythologies and religious customs are not problematic because of the traditions themselves, but rather because of a secular culture that has overwritten these traditions. To think about God, and the meaning of life, even if there is no understanding written or spoken, is an act of transcendence. Thinking symbolically becomes a form of consciousness that goes far beyond individuals. It's a meditation of the past and future, a reflection of the world within and beyond. Communicating through abstract ideas is at the foundation of creativity and symbolic thought, including art, music, the written word, mathematics, and science.

Winquist finds insight in René Descartes' Third Meditation, writing that in our thoughts about God, we transcend our "subjective dominance". The very thought of God's attributes create doubt about the innate ability of human nature to comprehend the existence of God. Descartes posited that he (Descartes), as a finite being, could never originate the idea of an infinite substance (God) unless it was placed in him by an actually infinite being. Winquist extended this, arguing that "thinking formulaically" about the divine actually defies the self. Traces of the divine — or even the "other" — alter the very thought patterns of the questioning individual, causing thought to transcend itself and disrupts its own "recording surface". While perceptual limitations (what Winquist termed a "knot") persist, he ultimately argues phenomenology is "humiliated", or brought to its limit, when encircled by meaningful nuances that that exceed its control.

Edmund Husserl's "phenomenological reduction", a sort of bracketing allows for the suspension of an object or content of a thought, judgment, or perception, called noema (as well as eidetic reduction), is a helpful key in understanding Winquist's work. Maurice Merleau-Ponty also weighed in on bracketing, although primarily because he rejected Husserl's ideas. It is debated whether or not he rejected "reductionism", but it's worth noting that Merleau-Ponty's opposition to Husserl sparked his phenomenology of perception. Merleau-Ponty wrote the most important thing about the reduction, and Husserl's constant re-examination of its possibility, was its impossibility. Husserl himself said, according to Merleau-Ponty, that the effort made the philosopher a perpetual beginner who should never take anything for granted, that philosophy "is an ever-renewed experiment in making its own beginning, that it consists wholly in the description of this beginning..."

=== Working from the middle ===
Winquist argued that concerns about beginnings and endings were "fictive productions of heuristic strategies", stating that being in the middle of experience should not be resisted. When people put themselves (or find themselves) in another person's experience, and empathize with, or "simulate" their perspectives and surrounding world, it coincides with their own, even though other factors in which "the other" represents his or her world must be different. Objects exist independently, despite the knot of perceptual subjectivity of the experience itself.

Secularists and Scientists are often suspicious of the need for transcendence and posit true knowledge comes only from objectivity. Husserl struggled with this notion and gradually adopted a more creative approach identified as transcendental idealism. The astronomical numbers of unperceived and unexpected features become evident, "intuitively presented", only by further observation. But the focus is not about "being", but about being the questioner. Every structure in a questioner's desire for knowledge mediates meaning, and even the sciences factor into "dharma", principles that order understanding. The act of becoming, or "being the questioner of being" transcends self-contained content and finds expression in conscious questioning, a process that returns self to experience and knowing.

These observations are best done from the middle. Acceptance of experience demands interpretation. Experience is often camouflaged, and the significance of being in the middle of experience is not easily accessed. Seeing through the manifest content of experience (see content (Freudian dream analysis)) reveals its hidden nature. This unmasking has traditionally been taught by prophets, Jesus, Muhammad, Buddha, and sages across the globe. Even psychoanalytic interpretation, Winquist argued, counts. The mask of piety that covers deliberate, hurtful acts, for example, simplifies reality and contributes to a “simplicity of denial”. We cannot “dream a story forward” if the story being told is not recognized for what it is. An awareness of the “I” of consciousness returns into itself, and being “in-itself” reaches beyond selfhood to unity with the universal. This understanding places us in the middle of experience, or the “middle term”, an awareness where the individual renounces self. Hegel, for example, called this the consciousness of the certainty of being all truth.

Metaphysical categories, abstract concepts such as being, knowing, substance, cause, identity, time, and space, are not the essence of meaning. Experience is not reduced to these categories. Experiences are exemplified and enlarged by the world and its traditions that connect us all. Consciousness takes an object — the other in all its forms — and the act of focused purpose cannot be detached from the renewed or, arguably, revived understanding of the perceiving subject. The focus on the "complexity of the middle" centers experience even in the presence of ambiguity and confusion. The human condition is situated between the "semantics" of desire and the "verbum of the hierophanies", the expression of the sacred. An individual is not "given" to an object. The object remains a mystery, and awareness of this, even in the most ordinary of experiences, adds depth and meaning to life. Winquist called this calm of the unknown a "dark time", or "taboo", a juncture of understanding that allows individuals to enter a "range of meaning" that is already a part of human experience. The middle allows an avenue of heightened awareness while remaining centered. Many modalities of thought can access the middle, and there is more than one way to turn thoughts to look upon the process itself.

=== Postmodern theology ===
Winquist was an early proponent of what has been called "weak theology", which emphasizes the responsibility of individuals to act in the world here and now — a controversial concept that has created a rift between traditionalists and deconstructionists — and was deeply engaged in the works of Friedrich Nietzsche, Jacques Derrida, Paul Tillich, and Mark C. Taylor, among others. Winquist argues in Desiring Theology, for example, that Derrida's deconstructive criticism is not "wild analysis", but the very careful reading of texts.

Jacques Derrida (1930-2004) was the founder of "deconstruction", a way of criticizing not only literary and philosophical texts, but also political institutions. Derrida rejected Platonism, which is defined by the belief that existence is structured in terms of oppositions (separate substances or forms) and that the oppositions are hierarchical, with one side of the opposition being more valuable than the other. Deconstruction attacks such beliefs by reversing hierarchies between the invisible or intelligible, the visible or sensible, essence and appearance and voice and writing. Derrida even rejects hierarchies between the soul and the body, or good and evil.

This is why deconstruction is often confusing: it explores what is hidden, not only in written texts, but in ordinary daily language and life. Because people borrow language, it has meanings beyond individuals and cultures. It has a semantic life of its own, and its content can never be fixed. Sounds and syntax come into people's minds uninvited, with one word leading to still more words. Understanding this is a reflection that replaces the source of the reflection — the individual — and opens up meaning beyond self. In Derrida's Glas and others he has written, The Truth in Painting for example (and creative works in general) Winquist argued, return us to the other and the beyond of multiple expressions, a base need for absolution ("the savior absolu").

Modernity and postmodernity have denied theology a privileged authority and privileged answers, but they cannot deny the privilege of its questions or formulation of questions as long as people are restless with a knowledge that disappoints.

— Charles E. Winquist
Unsettled and Unsettling

=== Deconstruction ===
Deconstruction explores what is "known and immediate", but not readily available, or even understood. A simple word or phrase, for example, spoken between two people, can have multiple meanings. The idea is that different communication styles ("languages") will have the same words, but the way they are used will have different meanings. Winquist argues that the inability to access this "hidden text" does not invalidate the experience, or the other viewpoint. This is the significance of the exchange, par excellence, which Winquist calls a "critique". It reveals alternative explorations by shaking up and dislodging "sedimentation", ridged interpretations in the surface content. Simply, in theology, as in life, the problem is not that God is missing, or the feelings and experiences of another, but that the "shadows" opening up in deconstructive work, just as the reality of the other in his or her experience, are already there.

Winquist said that while the focus of deconstruction work is about the text, the text itself is not the aggregate of all understanding. Thus all thoughts are based on an external point of reference; deconstruction is deeply concerned with the "other" of language, and people are imprisoned if they are not actively deconstructing. Deconstruction is not concerned with digging or looking behind the curtain, but seeing "otherness" itself, traces of alterity that validate existence. Dissatisfaction in modern-day theology comes from explorations that miss the depths in the wide-ranging scope of understandings already established. Skipping across the surface obscures and denigrates the qualitative nature of experiences hidden within, becoming rote and unavailable to daily concerns. Winquist calls this a "literalized, hermeneutical gap", spaces between the past and present, insights that human collaboration keep hidden. Self-satisfaction is partly to blame: It renders renewed meanings mute. But shadows revealed in deconstructive work are as real as what is readily available on the surface. This "knowledge gap", once revealed, renews understanding, and can never be exhausted by continued exploration.

=== Symbols and archetypes ===
Philosophies that limit the human spirit, or knowledge derived from sense-experience (stimulated by the rise of experimental science), have forced upon humanity a hermeneutics of suspicion against traditional values. New understandings contort traditions in search of renewed interpretations. The chaotic, "sparkling new" discovered in the shadowy contrasts between the literal and the "other" leads to a renewed theory of knowledge more detailed and whole. Winquist argued this should — and must — be delineated through images, much like a gestalt, where the whole is more than the sum of its parts, and often metaphorical. Winquist's writings on archetypes clarify his views:

Archetypal patterns should be viewed as connected procedures between actual feelings and forms of possibility that have evolved through the collective history of culture. Thus, archetypes are not identifiable with the realm of formal possibilities but are the residue of decisions that make patterns available for the integration of formal possibilities with actual feelings. To feel possibilities is to feel their embodiment in actual relationships. The discernment of an archetypal situation is a consciousness of a relational pattern that is present within the ecology of experience passed through the collective history that contrasts with the immediate pattern of individual decision or with a prevailing cultural pattern.

=== Expression of the sacred ===
Archetypal patterns are not just words and stories, but living truths and psychological realities that build upon human connections—soul, according to Carl Jung—and use symbolic language. The life of the other functions symbolically and it's in the encounter with this life that generates the contrasts at the foundations of new consciousness. Paul Ricoeur, an influential philosopher in Winquist's work, said modern understanding, in connection with new ways of questioning reality had placed language (and life) in a state of "semantic deficiency". Thus, lexicalized metaphor (words, phrases, or patterns to add depth of meaning) is necessary to compensate, and may even require a trope, a figurative or metaphorical use of a word or expression to supplement ideas lacking in language. In other words, "catachresis", the inappropriate use of a word or figure of speech that keeps the discourse in motion, an interplay of attractions and repulsions that ceaselessly promote domains off-centered to one another, much like that "ever-renewed experiment in making its own beginning". But Winquist argued that theology had become indistinguishable from history, philosophy, and other disciplines. Because of this, it had to be other than ordinary. Not a beginning, but a discourse that displayed "otherness", an interpretation that can be heard again.

The experience of originality without origins and serious thinking without foundations keep us bound to surfaces that are the space and theater of meaning.

— Charles E. Winquist
Desiring Theology

This is the process of life and language, but nothing superior in creation revealed to humankind, Yahweh, the Lord, Allah, Buddha is subject to the "controlling rules" of verification contemporary society demands ad nauseam. Theology, from the secular perspective is made to look naive, if not outright foolish and stupid. The future of theology is not defined exclusively by the text being read and studied. It is unveiled by showing the possibilities in what Winquist called humanity's "existential elements", which belong to life and the sacred connections revealed in the depths of human limitations. Renewal is found in balance with the structures of creation, the very source of human existence.

Those who first stood against God in solidarity with humanistic liberation seemed to have been culpable in the meaning of God as His or Her own condition when unified with the structures of being people encounter in every meeting with reality. Both the self and God are eclipsed with the deconstruction of the ontotheological tradition, which Winquist explored in his study of Tillich as an analysis of those structures of being encountered in reality. But while awareness within oneself may not exist beyond a "picturing consciousness", or beyond the self, it returns to have within itself all contingencies, or moments. Thus substance becomes subject, and abstractions and lifelessness disappears. The actual, or simple and universal, manifests itself. The task for theology is to bring awareness to the "dimensions of the ultimate", which needs to be opened to every generation. The continuity between the modern situation and the initial revelatory event should be grounded in harmony with the realities of life, under a single horizon, that opens to and enhances the event — or as Winquist called it: the "becoming of the occasion".

Winquist posited that illuminating, or satisfying, the becoming of the occasion was a kind of prehension to finding a structured order: an interaction of subject with event, or entity (the other), that concerned perception, but not always reliable cognition. This concept, presented in Winquist’s theological work, and actually grounded in empirical studies, suggested emotional states heighten memory retention. Thus, that which integrates physical reality with conceptuality is founded in the "transcendental imagination", a connection that shields, yet binds humanity to reality. People's emotionality coheres to the structures they encounter in life. Winquist argued there is a life history of striving beyond the passage of actualities; emotional and objective understanding (the conceptional reality of the transcendental imagination), as well as subjective goals, and the primordial nature of God bring interpretive, foundational knowledge.

This oxymoronic state of affairs (secular studies in religion, etc.) is a conceptual impertinence that is itself a trace of a forgotten moment of originating consciousness.

— Charles E. Winquist
The Epistemology of Darkness: Preliminary Reflections

Some have argued Winquist’s work is purely academic, at least regarding his posthumously published, “The Surface of the Deep”. And indeed, Winquist argued that a Christological witness cannot be relocated in "fundamental theology"—the philosophical, anthropological, scientific, and theological study to mediate faith’s meaning in culture—without destroying fundamental theology itself. But Winquist also explored how an authentic conversation created hope, developed and articulated in the conversation itself, "a hope that is intertwined with a faith that is always and already a part of the conversation".

The vitality of theological thinking goes far beyond the content of its reflection. It is the process itself that persists in the “genre of human activity”. Theologies of proclamation are internally rich, but not always richly connected to modern-day concerns; exploring the middle reveals “theories of discourse" that delve into the primary meaning of spiritual awareness. The “falsification of experiences” that elevates one tradition over another demands an exploration on the nature of God, a pilgrimage that is fundamental to both epistemology and theology. The concept of God in major religions, and the “truth of body” found in Buddhism are metaphysical. It cannot be understood outright, a common difficulty faced by every religion: the ultimate truth is driven by faith. It is important for practitioners to believe, but it is also important to distinguish between “belief in one religion” and “belief in many religions”.

This conversation, in consideration with theology's distinct publics (the wider society, the academy, and the church) transcends daily life because it displays the “otherness of its semantic achievement”. The word of God is a realm of understanding that, again, is not just an understanding of the text, but an understanding through language, an understanding that transcends the subject by revealing the experience of the subject. Theological discussions open conversations that help create a theology open to its diverse publics. Theology's relevance is distinguished by the openendedness of its presence.

== Positions held ==
Winquist was professionally active at the national level. He held several offices in the American Academy of Religion, including the office of executive director (see information box).

== Bibliography ==
- (1972) The Transcendental Imagination
- (1975) Communion of Possibility
- (1978) Homecoming
- (1980) Practical Hermeneutics
- (1986) Epiphanies of Darkness
- (1990) Theology at the End of the Century
- (1995) Desiring Theology
- (1999) Epiphanies of Darkness: Deconstruction in Theology
- (2003) The Surface of the Deep

== Anthologies ==
- Scharlemann, Robert P., ed. "Theology at the End Of the Century", University Press of Virginia, 1990.
- Winquist, Clarles E., ed. "Semeia 40: Text and Textuality", Society of Biblical Literature, 1987.

== Articles ==
- "Theology and the Manifestation of the Sacred", Theological Studies, 32/1, March 1971.
- "The Sacrament of the Word of God", Encounter, 33/3, Summer, 1972.
- "Reconstruction in Process Theology", Anglican Theological Review, LV/2, April 1973.
- "The Act of Storytelling and the Self's Homecoming", Journal of the American Academy of Religion, XLII, March 1974.
- "Altered States of Consciousness: Sacred and Profane", Anglican Theological Review, LVI/2, April 1974.
- "Practical Hermeneutics: A Revised Agenda for the Ministry", Anglican Theological Review, LVII/4, October 1976.
- "Scientific Models and Symbolic Meanings in Altered States of Consciousness", Journal of Drug Issues, 7/3, Spring 1977.
- "The Subversion and Transcendence of the Subject", Journal of the American Academy of Religion, XLVIII/1, March 1980.
- "The Epistemology of Darkness: Preliminary Reflections", Journal of the American Academy of Religion, XLIX/1, Spring 1981.
- "Interpretation and Imagination", JAAR Thematic Studies, XLVIII/1, Scholars Press, 1981.
- "Metaphor and the Accession to Theological Language", JAAR Thematic Studies, XLIX/1, Scholars Press, 1982.
- "Practical Hermeneutics and Pastoral Ministry", Theological Field Education: A Collection of Key Resources, Vol. I, 1982.
- "Theology, Deconstruction and Ritual Process", Zygon, Vol. 18, Number 3, September 1983.
- "Ministry: Post-Critical Reflections", The Christian Ministry, September, 1983.
- “Analogy, Apology, and the Imaginative Pluralism of David Tracy”, The Journal of the American Academy of Religion, LVI/2, Summer 1988.

== See also ==
- Deconstruction
- List of deconstructionists
- Postmodern Christianity
