= Richard Kearney =

Irish philosopher and public intellectual

Richard M. Kearney
- Born: 1954 (age 71–72); Cork, Ireland
- Spouse: Anne Bernard
- Awards: Election to the Royal Irish Academy (1998)

Education
- Education: University College Dublin (BA, 1975); McGill University (MA, 1976); University of Paris X: Nanterre (PhD, 1980)
- Theses: The Phenomenology of Imagination (1977); Poétique du possible : vers une herméneutique phénoménologique de la figuration (1980)
- Doctoral advisor: Paul Ricœur
- Other advisor: Charles Taylor

Philosophical work
- Era: Contemporary philosophy
- Region: Western philosophy
- School: Continental philosophy, hermeneutics, phenomenology
- Institutions: Boston College
- Main interests: Philosophy of religion; Political philosophy
- Notable ideas: Diacritical hermeneutics, carnal hermeneutics, anatheism

Richard M. Kearney (/ˈkɑːrni/; born 1954) is an Irish philosopher specializing in contemporary continental philosophy. He is the Charles Seelig Professor in Philosophy at Boston College and has taught at University College Dublin, Paris-Sorbonne University, the University of Nice, and the Australian Catholic University. He is also a member of the Royal Irish Academy. As a public intellectual in Ireland, he was involved in drafting several proposals for a Northern Irish peace agreement (1983, 1993, 1995). He is currently the international director of the Guestbook Project.

== Biography ==
Kearney studied at Glenstal Abbey under the Benedictines until 1972. He then attended University College Dublin, graduating with a B.A. in 1975. With fellow students, he launched the "Crane Bag" journal. He completed an M.A. at McGill University with Canadian philosopher Charles Taylor in 1976, then was a visiting student at the National University of Ireland in 1977. He earned his Ph.D. under Paul Ricœur at the University of Paris X: Nanterre. He corresponded with Jean-Paul Sartre, Jacques Derrida and other French philosophers of the era. He was also active in the Irish, British, and French media as a host for various television and radio programs on literary and philosophical themes. His work focuses on the philosophy of the narrative imagination, hermeneutics and phenomenology. Notable academic appointments include University College Dublin (1988–2001), the Film School at University College Dublin (1993–2005), the Paris-Sorbonne University (1995), and Boston College (1999–present).

Richard Kearney currently lives in Boston, Massachusetts, where he is married to Anne Bernard and has two daughters, Simone and Sarah.

== Work ==
Among Kearney's best-known written works are The Wake of the Imagination (Routledge, 1998), Poetics of Imagining (Fordham, 1998), On Stories (Routledge, 2002; translated into Dutch and Chinese), Strangers, Gods and Monsters: Interpreting Otherness (Routledge, 2003; translated into Greek and Korean), Debates in Continental Philosophy (Fordham, 2004), Modern Movements in European Philosophy (Manchester University Press, 1984), and Anatheism: Returning to God after God (Columbia, 2011; revised editions published in French and Italian).

Kearney's work attempts to steer "a middle path between Romantic hermeneutics (Schleiermacher) which retrieve and reappropriate God as presence and radical hermeneutics (Derrida, Caputo) which elevates alterity to the status of undecidable sublimity." He calls his approach "diacritical hermeneutics."

== See also ==
- Postmodern Christianity
