= Kelly James Clark =

Philosophy professor (born 1956)

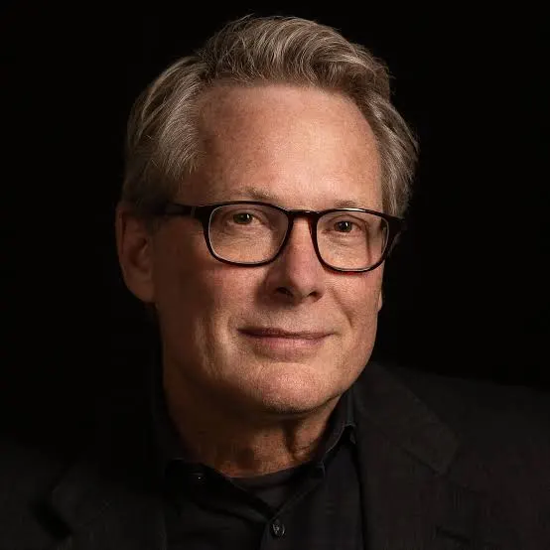
- Born: March 3, 1956 (age 69)

Education
- Education: Michigan State University (BA); Western Kentucky University (MA); University of Notre Dame (MA, PhD)
- Doctoral advisor: Alvin Plantinga

Philosophical work
- Main interests: Philosophy of religion

Kelly James Clark (born 3 March 1956) is an American philosopher whose work focuses on the philosophy of religion, science and religion, ethics, and the cognitive science of religion. Clark is the author, co-author, and editor of more than thirty books, including Return to Reason, Religion and the Sciences of Origins, Abraham's Children: Liberty and Tolerance in an Age of Religious Conflict, God and the Brain, and Raging Fire of Love: what I've learned from Jesus, the Jews, and the Prophet.

Since 2010, Clark has been active in academic interfaith projects involving Muslim, Christian and Jewish scholars, including Templeton-funded initiatives on religious liberty and tolerance and on Abrahamic perspectives on science and religion.

== Biography ==
Clark received a B.A. in philosophy and religious studies from Michigan State University in 1978 and an M.A. in humanities from Western Kentucky University in 1980. He then obtained an M.A. in the history and philosophy of science in 1982 and his Ph.D. in philosophy from the University of Notre Dame under Alvin Plantinga.

He has held professorships at Calvin College, Oxford University, University of St. Andrews, Notre Dame & Gordon College. He also served as Executive Director for the Society of Christian Philosophers from 1994 to 2009.

Clark's books include God and the Brain, Strangers, Neighbors, Friends, Religion and the Sciences of Origins, Abraham's Children, Return to Reason, The Story of Ethics, When Faith Is Not Enough, and 101 Key Philosophical Terms of Their Importance for Theology, many of which have been translated into multiple languages. In 1995, his book Philosophers Who Believe was named one of Christianity Today's Books of the Year. That book detailed the spiritual and intellectual autobiographies of philosophers such as Alvin Plantinga, Nicholas Wolterstorff, Basil Mitchell, Mortimer Adler, Richard Swinburne, Frederick Suppe, Linda Zagzebski, and Nicholas Rescher.

== Academic career ==
In 1989, he joined the Philosophy Department at Calvin College (now Calvin University) in Grand Rapids, Michigan, where he was Professor of Philosophy until 2012. From 2012, he was a Senior Research Fellow in Grand Valley State University's Kaufman Interfaith Institute, working on interfaith and science-and-religion projects. In 2020, he was appointed Distinguished Professor of Philosophy at Ibn Haldun University in Istanbul, Turkey.

== Areas of work ==
Clark's academic work is primarily in philosophy of religion, particularly epistemology of religious belief, as well as in science and religion and the cognitive science of religion. His book Return to Reason is a book-length exposition of Alvin Plantinga's Reformed epistemology (aka Plantinga for Dummies), with commentators describing it as among the first comprehensive treatments of that approach.

In Evidence and Religious Belief, co-edited with Raymond J. VanArragon, Clark brought together essays on evidentialism, Reformed epistemology, and related debates in religious epistemology. The collection has been reviewed in a number of philosophical and theological journals, including Notre Dame Philosophical Reviews, Dialogue, and Mind.

Clark's Religion and the Sciences of Origins surveys historical and contemporary relations between religious belief and the sciences, including cosmology, evolutionary biology and neuroscience.

In God and the Brain: The Rationality of Belief, Clark engages research in cognitive science in relation to debates over the rationality of religious belief and unbelief.

== Interfaith and public work ==
Clark has been active in interfaith projects among Christians, Muslims, and Jews. He edited Abraham's Children: Liberty and Tolerance in an Age of Religious Conflict, a multi-author volume on religious liberty and tolerance in the Abrahamic traditions published by Yale University Press in 2012. Abraham's Children includes chapters by former US President Jimmy Carter and Abdurrahman Wahid, the first democratically elected President of Indonesia (and leader of Nahdlatal Ulama, the largest Muslim organization in the world).

In connection with the tenth anniversary of the September 11 attacks, Clark co-chaired an interfaith conference at Georgetown University titled "Liberty and Tolerance in an Age of Religious Conflict," hosted by the Berkley Center for Religion, Peace, and World Affairs and supported by the John Templeton Foundation.

At the Kaufman Interfaith Institute, Clark directed a $1 million project, "Abrahamic Reflections on Science and Religion," bringing together Muslim, Jewish, and Christian scholars from multiple countries to examine questions at the intersection of science and theology. He has also directed or co-directed multi-million dollar projects on science and religion and on moral values and virtues in China.

== Reception and awards ==
Clark's edited work, Abraham's Children: Liberty and Tolerance in an Age of Religious Conflict, has been reviewed in academic and religious journals and has been cited in subsequent literature on interreligious dialogue and religious liberty.

Philosophical and theological discussions of religious epistemology and science and religion have engaged with Return to Reason, Evidence and Religious Belief, and Religion and the Sciences of Origins.

Clark's Raging Fire of Love, with forewords by the Dalai Lama and Archbishop Desmond Tutu, was awarded Best Book in Religion from the New York Book Festival (2024), the NYC Big Book Award (2024), the San Francisco Book Festival (2024), and the International Book Award (2025).

== Controversy in Iran ==
In 2014, Clark became the focus of controversy in Mashhad, Iran, when some Shia clerics accused him of being a "promoter of homosexuality" and an evolutionist and boycotted his lectures.

== Selected books ==
- Clark, Kelly James (2024). Raging Fire of Love: What I’ve Learned from Jesus, the Jews, and the Prophet—Awards Edition. Independently published.
- Clark, Kelly James (2024). Raging Fire of Love: What I've Learned from Jesus, the Jews, and the Prophet--Philosophers Edition. Independently published.
- Clark, Kelly James (2023). God and the Problems of Love. Cambridge, England: Cambridge University Press.
- Clark, Kelly James; Winslett, Justin (2022). A Spiritual Geography of Early Chinese Thought: Gods, Ancestors and Afterlife. New York: Bloomsbury.
- Cark, Kelly James; Borgman, Paul (2019). Written to Be Heard: Recovering the Lost Messages of the Gospels. Grand Rapids: William B. Eerdmans.
- God and the Brain. Eerdmans, 2019
- Strangers, Neighbors, Friends. Cascade Books, 2018. Co-written with Aziz Abu Sarah and Rabbi Nancy Kreimer.
- Readings in the Philosophy of Religion. Broadview Press, 2017.
- The Blackwell Companion to Naturalism. Wiley-Blackwell, 2016.
- Religion and the Sciences of Origins. Palgrave Macmillan; 2014.
- Abraham's Children: Liberty and Tolerance in an age of Religious Conflict. Yale University Press, 2012
- Reason, Metaphysics, and Mind: New Essays on the Philosophy of Alvin Plantinga, Oxford University Press, 2012. Co-edited with Michael Rea.
- Evidence and Religious Belief. Oxford University Press, 2011. Co-edited with Ray VanArragon.
- Faith, Knowledge and Naturalism, Peking University Press, 2007. Co-edited with Xing Taotao.
- Ethics, Religion and Society (Christian Academics, Fifth Volume). Co-edited with Zhang Qingxiong and Xu Yi Yie. Shanghai Guji Press, 2007.
- Human Nature in Chinese and Western Culture, co-edited with Chen Xia. Sichuan University Press, 2005.
- 101 Key Philosophical Terms and Their Importance for Theology. Westminster/John Knox Press, 2004. Co-authored with James K.A. Smith and Richard Lints.
- A Dialogue Between Science and Religion, co-edited with Mel Stewart and Zhou Zhianzang. Xiamen University Press, 2004.
- The Story of Ethics: Human Nature & Human Fulfillment. Prentice-Hall, 2003. Co-authored with Anne Poortenga.
- Five Views on Apologetics. Zondervan Publishing Company, 2000. Co-authored with William Lane Craig, Gary Habermas, John Frame and Paul Feinberg.
- When Faith Is Not Enough. Eerdmans Publishing Company, 1997.
- Philosophers Who Believe. InterVarsity Press, 1993.
- Return to Reason. Eerdmans Publishing Company, 1990.
- Our Knowledge of God: Essays on Natural and Philosophical Theology. Kluwer academic publishers, 1992.
