= Mary-Jane Rubenstein =

American philosopher

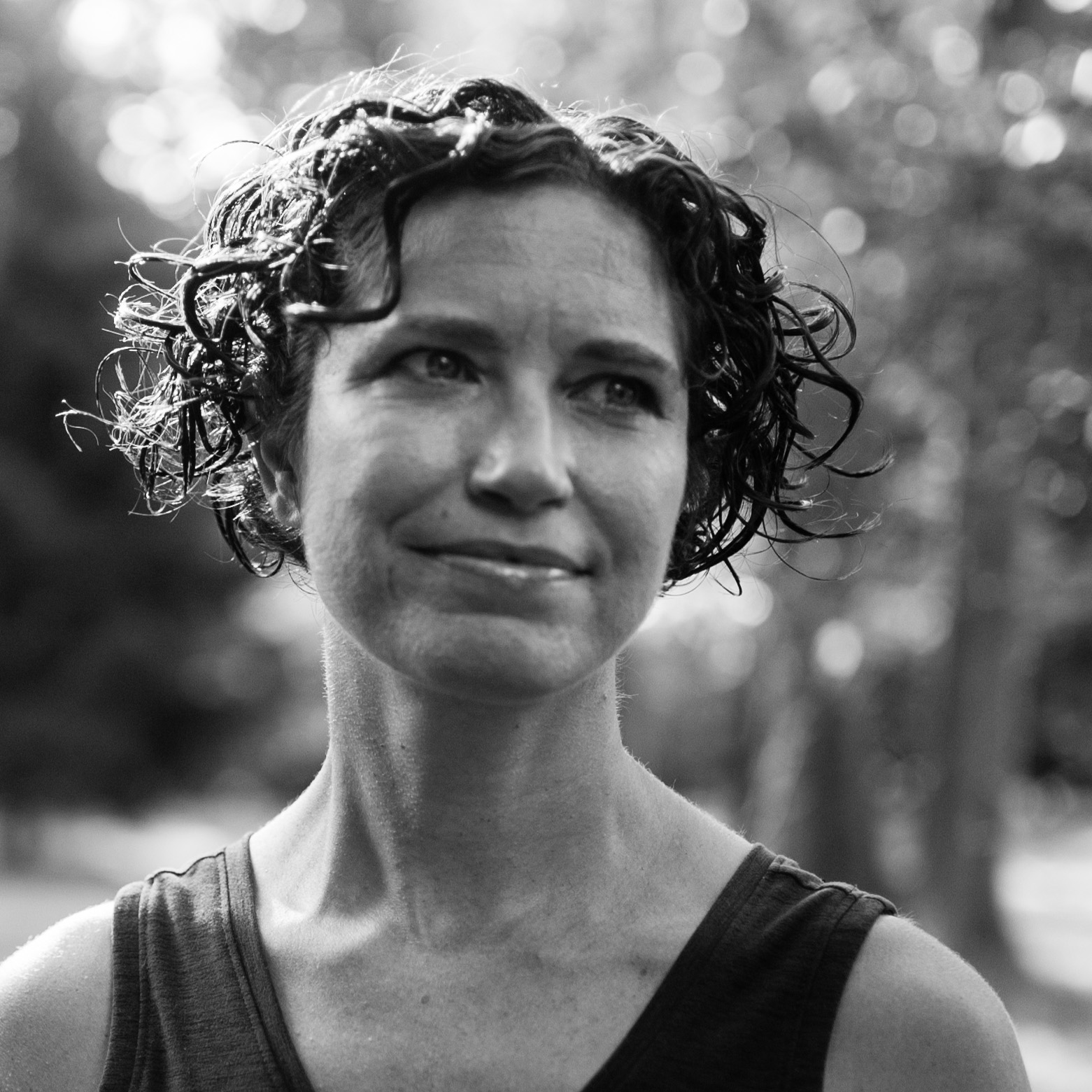
- Born: 1977 (age 48–49); United States

Education
- Education: Columbia University; University of Cambridge; Williams College

Philosophical work
- Main interests: Philosophy of Religion, Philosophy of Science, History of Philosophy, History of Science, Gender Studies, Religious Studies, Continental Philosophy, Postmodern Theology

Mary-Jane Rubenstein is a scholar of religion, philosophy, science studies, and gender studies. At Wesleyan University, she is Dean of Social Sciences, Professor of Religion and Science and Technological Studies. She has also been an affiliated member of the departments of Philosophy, Environmental Studies and Feminist, Gender, and Sexuality Studies. From 2014 to 2019, she was co-chair of the Philosophy of Religion Unit of the American Academy of Religion. She is a Fellow of the International Society for Science and Religion. Her book, Worlds without End: The Many Lives of the Multiverse, served as one source of inspirational material for the Oscar-winning 2022 American film, Everything Everywhere All at Once.

== Education ==
Rubenstein earned a Bachelor of Arts degree in Religion and English (summa cum laude) at Williams College in 1999. With the support of a Dr. Herchel Smith Fellowship, she studied philosophical theology at the University of Cambridge, where she earned a Post-Graduate Diploma in 2000 and an MPhil in 2001. She was granted a Jacob K. Javits Fellowship to pursue doctoral work at Columbia University, where she received a PhD in Philosophy of Religion in 2006.

== Career ==
From 2005 to 2006, Rubenstein was Scholar-in-Residence at the Cathedral of St. John the Divine. In 2006, she earned Columbia University's Core Curriculum Award for Graduate Teaching and served as the Doctoral Commencement Speaker. Rubenstein was appointed Assistant Professor of Religion at Wesleyan University in 2006, Associate Professor in 2011, Professor in 2014, and Dean of Social Sciences in 2023. She now co-directs the university's Space Ethics Research Constellation and won the Wesleyan Binswanger Prize for Excellence in Teaching in 2017.

== Research ==
Rubenstein's research uncovers the mythological and theological legacies of contemporary philosophy and science. While her early work investigated the disavowal of wonder in phenomenology and deconstruction, her more recent writing has moved into the metaphysical underpinnings of cosmology, astronomy and space travel, general relativity and quantum mechanics, and non-linear biology and ecology.

Her 2023 book, Astrotopia, diagnoses the "corporate space race" as a contemporary messianic movement.

== Publications ==
- Cosmic Missions: Religion and Space Exploration, co-edited with Lance Gharavi (New York: Columbia University Press, 2026).
- Astrotopia: The Dangerous Religion of the Corporate Space Race (Chicago: University of Chicago Press, 2022).
- Image: Three Inquiries in Technology and Imagination, with Thomas A. Carlson and Mark C. Taylor (Chicago: University of Chicago Press, 2021).
- Pantheologies: Gods, Worlds, Monsters (New York: Columbia University Press, 2018 [cloth], 2021 [paper]).
- Entangled Worlds: Science, Religion, and New Materialisms, co-edited with Catherine Keller (New York: Fordham University Press, 2017).
- Worlds without End: The Many Lives of the Multiverse (New York: Columbia University Press, 2014 [cloth], 2015 [paper]).
- Polydox Reflections, co-edited with Kathryn Tanner (London: Wiley-Blackwell, 2014).
- Strange Wonder: The Closure of Metaphysics and the Opening of Awe (New York: Columbia University Press, 2009 [cloth], 2011 [paper]).

Rubenstein has also published numerous articles, chapters, and interviews.

== See also ==
- Spaceportopia
