= Ben Witherington III =

American religion academic (born 1951)

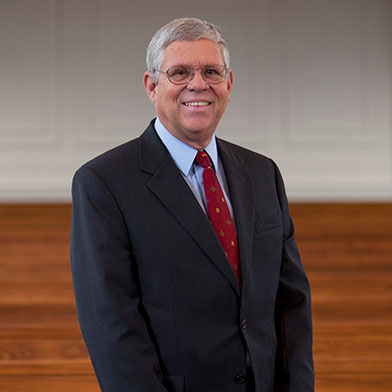
- Born: December 30, 1951 (age 74); High Point, North Carolina, U.S.
- Title: Professor of New Testament Interpretation at Asbury Theological Seminary
- Spouse: Ann Witherington
- Children: 2 (1 deceased)

Academic background
- Education: University of North Carolina at Chapel Hill, Gordon-Conwell Theological Seminary
- Alma mater: University of Durham (PhD)

Academic work
- Discipline: Biblical studies
- Sub-discipline: New Testament studies
- Institutions: Ashland Theological Seminary; Vanderbilt University; Duke Divinity School; Gordon-Conwell; Asbury Theological Seminary
- Notable works: The Jesus Quest, The Paul Quest

Ben Witherington III (born December 30, 1951) is an American Wesleyan-Arminian New Testament scholar. Witherington is Professor of New Testament Interpretation at Asbury Theological Seminary, a Wesleyan-Holiness seminary in Wilmore, Kentucky, and an ordained pastor in the United Methodist Church.

== Biography ==
Witherington was born on December 30, 1951, in High Point, North Carolina. He is son of Ben, a banker and Joyce West, a piano teacher. On June 1, 1977, Witherington married Ann E. Sears, an educator. He had two children, Christy Ann and David Benjamin. On January 11, 2012, Witherington's daughter died of a pulmonary embolism.

Witherington attended the University of North Carolina at Chapel Hill and graduated in 1974 with a Bachelor of Arts degree in English, along with minors in Philosophy and Religious Studies. He holds a Master of Divinity degree from Gordon-Conwell Theological Seminary (1977) and a Ph.D. from Durham University in England (1981).

== Career ==
From 1984 to 1995 he was professor of New Testament at Ashland Theological Seminary. He is currently "Jean R. Amos" Professor of New Testament for Doctoral Studies at Asbury Theological Seminary (1995-) Witherington has also taught at Vanderbilt University, and on the doctoral faculty at St. Andrews University in Scotland.

From 1982 to 1983 he had been a faculty member of the Duke Divinity School and the High Point College. In 1988, 1990, 1992, he was a visiting professor of the Gordon–Conwell Theological Seminary. He was a research fellow (1992), and member (1996) at Robinson College, Cambridge University.

He is a member of the Society of Biblical Literature, Society for the Study of the New Testament and the Institute for Biblical Research.

In 1982, he was ordained as a Methodist elder. Witherington has presented seminars for churches, colleges and biblical meetings in the United States, England, Estonia, Russia, Europe, South Africa, Zimbabwe and Australia. He has also led tours to Italy, Greece, Turkey, Israel, Jordan, and Egypt. His books The Jesus Quest and The Paul Quest were selected as top biblical studies works by the Evangelical magazine Christianity Today. Witherington has been seen on the History Channel, NBC, ABC, CBS, CNN, The Discovery Channel, A&E and PAX Network. He was featured in the BBC and PBS special entitled The Story of Jesus.

== Theology ==
Witherington is a prominent evangelical scholar. He is Wesleyan Armininan in his theology. In The Problem with Evangelical Theology Witherington strongly challenges the exegetical foundation of Calvinism on each of its distinctive tenets. He often insists on the possibility of apostasy of the believer and the related doctrine of conditional preservation of the saints (conditional security). He generally refers to the character of God, the nature of his grace and his love as a justification for his soteriology. He is also a devout pacifist.

== Selected works ==
=== Books ===
Witherington has written over sixty books.

- Witherington III, Ben (1984). Women in the ministry of Jesus: a study of Jesus' attitudes to women and their roles as reflected in his earthly life. Society for New Testament Studies, Monograph Series. Cambridge: Cambridge University Press.
- ——— (1988). Women in the Earliest Churches. Society for New Testament Studies, Monograph Series. Cambridge: Cambridge University Press.
- ——— (1988). Grace in Galatia: a commentary on St Paul's Letter to the Galatians. Grand Rapids, MI: Eerdmans.
- ———; Witherington, Ann (1990). Women and the Genesis of Christianity. Cambridge: Cambridge University Press.
- ——— (1990). The christology of Jesus. Minneapolis: Fortress Press.
- ——— (1992). Jesus, Paul and the end of the world: a comparative study in New Testament eschatology. Downers Grove, IL: Inter-Varsity Press.
- ——— (1993). Conflict and community in Corinth : a socio-rhetorical commentary on 1 & 2 Corinthians. Grand Rapids, MI: William B. Eerdmans.
- ——— (1994). Friendship and finances in Philippi: the letter of Paul to the Philippians. Valley Forge, PA: Trinity Press International.
- ——— (1994). Paul's narrative thought world: the tapestry of tragedy and triumph. Louisville: Westminster/John Knox Press.
- ——— (1994). Jesus the Sage: The Pilgrimage of Wisdom. London: T & T Clark.
- ——— (1995). The Jesus Quest: The Third Search for the Jew of Nazareth. Downers Grove, IL: InterVarsity Press.
- ——— (1995). John's wisdom: a commentary on the fourth Gospel. Cambridge: Lutterworth Press.
- ——— (1998). The Acts of the Apostles. A Socio-Rhetorical Commentary. Grand Rapids, MI: Eerdmans.
- ——— (1998). The Paul Quest: The Renewed Search for the Jew of Tarsus. Downers Grove, IL: InterVarsity Press.
- ——— (1998). The many faces of the Christ: the Christologies of the New Testament and beyond. New York: Crossroad.
- ——— (1999). Jesus the Seer: The Progress of Prophecy. Peabody, MA: Hendrickson Publishers.
- ——— (1999). The realm of the reign: reflections on the dominion of God. Nashville, TN: Discipleship Resources.
- ——— (2000). The Gospel of Mark: a socio-rhetorical commentary. Grand Rapids, MI: Eerdmans.
- ——— (2001). New Testament History: A Narrative Account. Grand Rapids, MI: Baker Academic.
- ——— (2001). The shadow of the Almighty: father, son, and spirit in biblical perspectives. Grand Rapids, MI: William B. Eerdmans Pub.
- ——— (2002). The poetry of piety: an annotated anthology of Christian poetry. Grand Rapids, MI: Baker Academic.
- ——— (2003). The Brother of Jesus: the Dramatic Story & Meaning of the First Archaeological Link to Jesus & his Family. San Francisco: HarperSanFrancisco.
- ——— (2004). Paul's letter to the Romans : a socio-rhetorical commentary. Grand Rapids, MI: William B. Eerdmans.
- ——— (2004). The Gospel Code: Novel Claims About Jesus, Mary Magdalene, and Da Vinci. Downers Grove, IL: InterVarsity Press.
- ——— (2006). Matthew. Macon, GA: Smyth & Helwys Publishing.
- ——— (2007). What Have They Done with Jesus?. New York: Harper Collins.
- ——— (2007). Making a Meal of It — Rethinking the Theology of the Lord's Supper. Waco, TX: Baylor University Press.
- ——— (2007). Troubled Waters — Rethinking the Theology of Baptism. Waco, TX: Baylor University Press.
- ——— (2007a). The Problem with Evangelical Theology: Testing the Exegetical Foundations of Calvinism, Dispensationalism, and Wesleyanism. Waco, TX: Baylor University Press.
- ——— (2010). Revelation and the end times: unraveling God's message of hope. Nashville: Abingdon Press.
- ——— (2016). New Testament Theology and Ethics. Vol. 1. Downers Grove, IL: Inter-Varsity Press.
- ——— (2016). New Testament Theology and Ethics. Vol. 2. Downers Grove, IL: Inter-Varsity Press.

=== Articles ===
Witherington has written articles in different journals as: Ashland Theological Journal, Bible Q & A, Beliefnet, Bible Review, Biblical Archaeology Review, Christian History, Christianity Today, Journal of Biblical Literature, New Testament Studies, North Carolina Christian Advocate, Quarterly Review, Tyndale Bulletin, UM Publishing House.

- Witherington III, Ben (2012a). "When a Daughter Dies: Walking the Way of Grace in the Midst of Grief". Christianity Today.

== Notes and references ==
=== Sources ===
- ATS (2020). "Ben Witherington III". Asbury Theological Seminary.
- Bauer, David R. (2013). "Perfection of Disciples in the Matthew's Gospel". Kingdom Rhetoric: New Testament Explorations in Honor of Ben. Eugene, OR: Wipf & Stock.
- BAS (2020). "Ben Witherington". Biblical Archaeology Society.
- Galli, Mark (2005). "The Problem with Evangelical Theologies". Christianity Today. 23.
- Halcomb, T. Michael W. (2013). Kingdom Rhetoric: New Testament Explorations in Honor of Ben. Eugene, OR: Wipf & Stock.
- Hamilton, James M. (2010). God's Glory in Salvation through Judgment: A Biblical Theology. Wheaton, IL: Crossway.
- Kirkpatrick, Daniel (2018). Monergism or Synergism: Is Salvation Cooperative or the Work of God Alone?. Eugene, OR: Pickwick Publication.
- Sams, Adama D. (2008). Contemporary authors new revision series. Vol. 168. Detroit, MI: Gale.
- Sider, Ronald J. (2019). If Jesus Is Lord: Loving Our Enemies in an Age of Violence. Grand Rapids, MI: Baker Academic.
- STNS (2016). "SNTS Membership List, 2016" (PDF). snts.international.
- Treier, Daniel J. (2008). "Reviewed Work: The Problem with Evangelical Theology: Testing the Exegetical Foundations of Calvinism, Dispensationalism and Wesleyanism by Ben Witherington III". Bulletin for Biblical Research. 18 (1): 186–188. doi:10.2307/26423764. JSTOR 26423764.
- Witherington III, Ben (2012b). "'Behavior Doesn't Interrupt Your Relationship with Christ': A Recipe for Disaster". Christianity Today.
- Witherington III, Ben (2013). "Why a Wesleyan Approach to Theology?". Seebed. [Franklin, TE].
- Witherington III, Ben (2018). "Curriculum Vitae". Dr. Ben Witherington III.
