= Jason Starr (filmmaker) =

American filmmaker

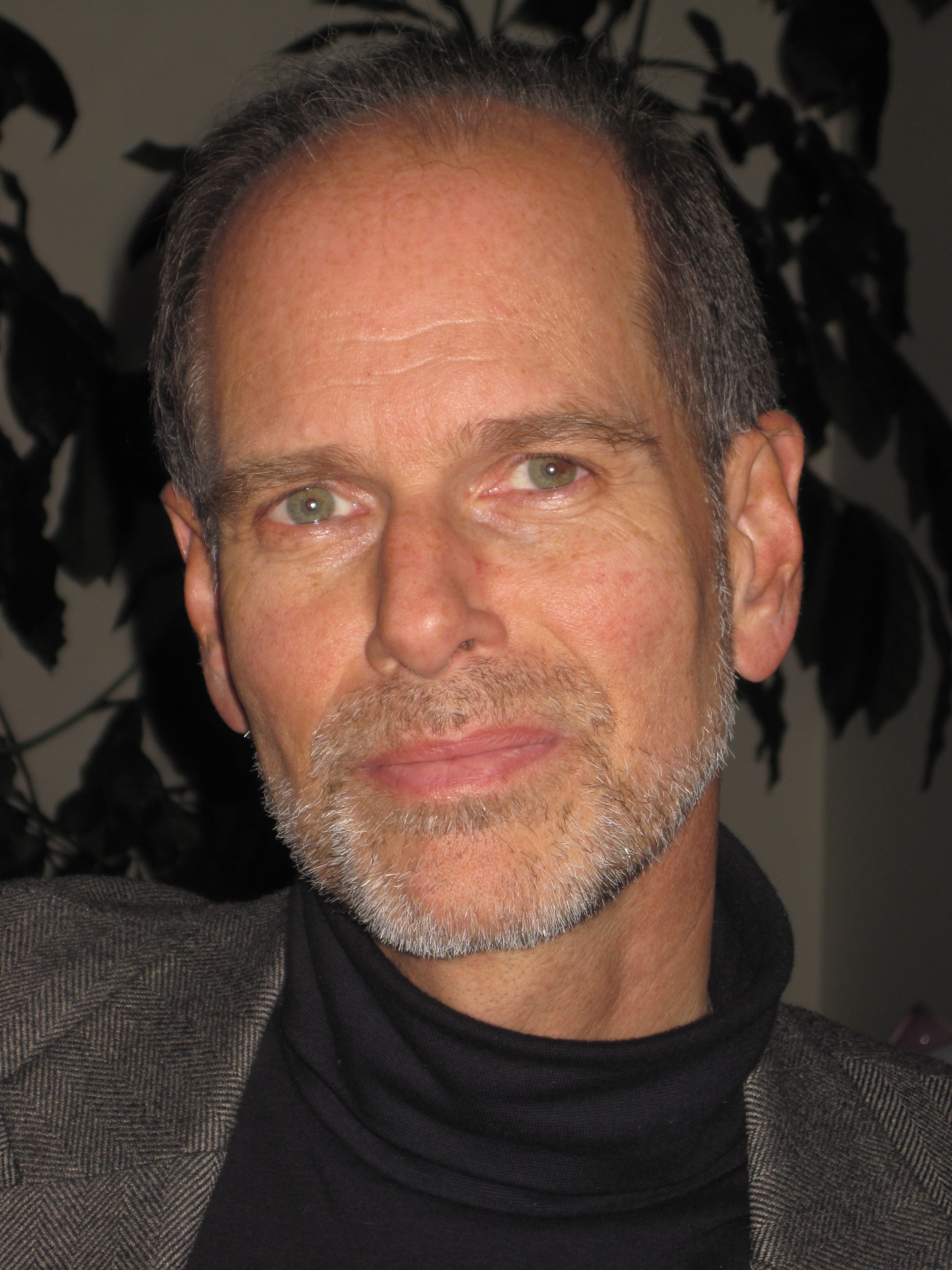
- Occupation: Filmmaker
- Website: https://culturalmedia.net/

Jason Starr is an American filmmaker, television producer and director based in New York City.

== Overview ==
Jason Starr has directed symphony orchestra broadcasts and produced documentaries on a variety of cultural subjects, most notably classical music. Known for their philosophical character, Starr’s films often use an interdisciplinary approach to present a specific work of art in its biographical, cultural and historical context.

== Documentary films ==
- PRELUDE Laurence Luckinbill, Dan Wagoner and Dancers and Emerson String Quartet. For BRAVO. (1981)
- FILMMAKERS Stan Brakhage, Linda Klosky and Robert Fulton. For Public Broadcasting Service. (1986)
- WILDLIFE CINEMATOGRAPHER WOLFGANG BAYER For Public Broadcasting Service. (1987)
- A MASTER’S CLASS Eugene Istomin and Isaac Stern. For A&E. (1989)
- BACKSTAGE/LINCOLN CENTER Emmanuel Ax, Alfred Brendel, Sarah Chang, Yo-Yo Ma, Kurt Masur, Renata Scotto, members of the New York Philharmonic Orchestra. For Public Broadcasting Service. (1994–96)
- WHAT THE UNIVERSE TELLS ME: UNRAVELING THE MYSTERIES OF MAHLER’S THIRD SYMPHONY Stockard Channing, Glen Cortese, Peter Franklin, Howard Gardner, Thomas Hampson, Deborah Hertz, Catherine Keller, Henry-Louis de La Grange, Glen Mazis, Donald Mitchell, Edward Reilly, Morten Solvik. For Cultural Media Collaborative. (2004)
- OF LOVE, DEATH AND BEYOND – EXPLORING MAHLER’S “RESURRECTION” SYMPHONY Constantin Floros, Peter Franklin, Neil Gillman, Thomas Hampson, Stephen Hefling, Catherine Keller, Neeme Järvi, Henry-Louis de La Grange, Susanne Mentzer, Donald Mitchell, Martha Nussbaum, Twyla Robinson, Morten Solvik. For Cultural Media Collaborative. (2011)
- EVERYWHERE AND FOREVER – MAHLER’S SONG OF THE EARTH Paul Groves, Peter Franklin, Thomas Hampson, Stephen Hefling, Neeme Järvi, Catherine Keller, Henry-Louis de La Grange, Marina Mahler, Orchestre de la Suisse Romande, Morten Solvik. For 3sat and RTS Radio Télévision Suisse. (2014)
- FOR THE LOVE OF MAHLER: THE INSPIRED LIFE OF HENRY-LOUIS DE LA GRANGE Pierre Boulez, Riccardo Chailly, Christoph Eschenbach, Gaston Fournier-Facio, Thomas Hampson, Stephen Hefling, Marina Mahler, Bruno Megevand, Claude Samuel, Morten Solvik, Francoise Xenakis. For Cultural Media Collaborative. (2014)
- ON MAHLER’S SONGS OF A WAYFARER Thomas Hampson, Stephen Hefling, Neeme Järvi, Caroline Kita, Catherine Keller, Morten Solvik, Sybille Werner and the Estonian National Symphony Orchestra. For Cultural Media Collaborative and ETV. (2019)
- MAHLER’S TITAN: THE ROMANCE, DEATH AND TRIUMPH OF A YOUNG MUSICIAN Peter Franklin, Thomas Hampson, Stephen Hefling, Neeme Järvi, Caroline Kita, Catherine Keller, Marina Mahler, Marilyn McCoy, Morten Solvik, Sybille Werner and the Estonian National Symphony Orchestra. For Cultural Media Collaborative and Estonian Public Television. (2019)

== Concert films for television ==
- ARS NOVA Emerson String Quartet, Gilbert Kalish, New York New Music Ensemble, Western Wind. For Canadian Broadcasting Corporation. (1982)
- THE BEETHOVEN CYCLE Guarneri String Quartet. For BRAVO, Pioneer LaserVision and Cultural Media Collaborative. (1988)
- GUSTAV MAHLER SYMPHONY NO. 3 Manhattan School of Music Symphony Orchestra, Glen Cortese. Mignon Dunn, Riverside Women’s Chorus, Riverside Boy’s Choir. For Cultural Media Collaborative. (1998)
- GUSTAV MAHLER SYMPHONY NO. 2 “RESURRECTION” Members of the New York Philharmonic, Philadelphia Orchestra, Metropolitan Opera Orchestra, Detroit Symphony, New Jersey Symphony, New York Choral Artists, Neeme Järvi, Susanne Mentzer, Twyla Robinson. For Public Broadcasting Service and Cultural Media Collaborative. (2006)
- NEEME JÄRVI 70TH BIRTHDAY JUBILEE Estonian National Symphony, Estonian National Men’s Choir, Kristjan Järvi, Maarik Järvi, Neeme Järvi and Paavo Järvi. For Estonian Public Broadcasting, Mezzo TV and Cultural Media Collaborative. (2007)
- ALPINE SYMPHONY Hague Philharmonic, Neeme Järvi, Pauline Oostenrijk. For TV West, Mezzo TV, Euro1080 and Cultural Media Collaborative. (2008)
- JONAH’S MISSION Estonian National Symphony, Estonian National Chorus and Boy’s Choir, Neeme Järvi. For Estonian Public Television and Cultural Media Collaborative. (2009)
- INTERNATIONAL TCHAIKOVSKY COMPETITION (VIOLIN) Marinsky Orchestra, Valery Gergiev, Saint Petersburg Philharmonic, Nikolay Alexeev, Chamber Orchestra of Mariinsky Theatre, Michael Francis. Kultura TV and live webcast. (2011)
- DAS LIED VON DER ERDE and TOD UND VERKLÄRUNG, Orchestre de la Suisse Romande, Neeme Järvi, Paul Groves and Thomas Hampson. For RTS Radio Télévision Suisse, Mezzo and 3sat. (2012)
- GAVEAUX’S LÉONORE OU L'AMOUR CONJUGAL Kimy McLaren, Jean-Michel Richer, Tomislav Lavoie, Pascale Beaudin, Keven Geddes, Alexandre Sylvestre, Ryan Brown, Opera Lafayette Orchestra. For Opera Lafayette and Naxos. (2017)
- EARLY GUSTAV MAHLER Thomas Hampson, Neeme Järvi, and the Estonian National Symphony Orchestra. For Cultural Media Collaborative and Estonian Public Television. (2018)
- BEETHOVEN’S LÉONORE (1805) Nathalie Paulin, Jean-Michel Richer, Stephen Hegedus, Pascale Beaudin, Matthew Scollin, Keven Geddes, Alexandre Sylvestre, Ryan Brown, Opera Lafayette Orchestra. For Opera Lafayette and Naxos. (2020)
- CHILDREN OF BRONZEVILLE Thomas Enhco, Vanisha Gould, Patrick Zimmerli. For Savage Ticket. (2020)
