= Image (journal) =

American literary journal

- Discipline: Art, culture, faith, literature
- Language: English
- Edited by: James K.A. Smith, Mary Kenagy Mitchell

Publication details
- History: 1989–present
- Publisher: Center for Religious Humanism (USA)
- Frequency: Quarterly

Standard abbreviations
- ISO 4: Image

Indexing
- ISSN: 1087-3503

Links
- Journal homepage

Image is an American quarterly literary journal that publishes art and writing engaging or grappling with Judeo-Christian faith. The journal's byline is "Art, Faith, Mystery". Image features fiction, poetry, painting, sculpture, architecture, film, music and dance. The journal also sponsors the Glen Workshop and the Denise Levertov Award.

Material first published in Image has appeared in Harper's Magazine, The Best American Essays, The Pushcart Prize: Best of the Small Presses, The Best Spiritual Writing, The O. Henry Prize Stories, The Art of the Essay, New Stories from the South, The Best American Movie Writing, and The Best Christian Writing. In 2000 and 2003, Image was nominated by Utne Reader for an Independent Press Award in the category of Spiritual Coverage.

== History ==
Image was established in 1989 by founding editor Gregory Wolfe and was based at Seattle Pacific University. Image was involved with the founding of Seattle Pacific University's Master of Fine Arts degree, which launched in 2005. and was discontinued in 2024.

In 2019, Image announced a new editorial team including writer and philosophy professor at Calvin College, James K.A. Smith as Editor-in-Chief. Smith left in 2024, when Molly McCully Brown became Editor-in-Chief.

== Glen Workshops ==
The Glen Workshop, begun in 1995 and sponsored by Image, is a week-long summer conference featuring classes taught by professional poets, writers, and visual artists. The Glen has been held at St. John's College in Santa Fé, New Mexico and a variety of other locations. Each year the workshops center around a specific creative theme such as "Acts of Attention: The Art of Discovery," "The Generations in Our Bones: Art and Tradition," and "Border Crossings: Art and Risk." Workshop classes often include fiction, poetry, memoir, songwriting, photography, and painting, among other options.

== Arts and Faith ==
Image hosted an online forum called Arts and Faith, which facilitated discussion on topics such as film, music, literature, visual art, theater and dance, and television and radio, as well as general faith and life topics. The forum released Top 100 and Top 25 Film lists each year, both overall and in specific categories such as horror films or films about marriage. Film critics involved in Arts and Faith included Jeffrey Overstreet, Steven Greydanus, Peter T. Chattaway, and Michael Leary of Filmwell.

== Denise Levertov Award ==
Image co-sponsors the annual Levertov Award with the Seattle Pacific University English Department and its MFA Program in Creative Writing. Every spring they present the award to one artist or writer. The award is named for the American poet Denise Levertov. Past recipients include:

- Madeline DeFrees
- Franz Wright
- Kathleen Norris
- Thomas Lynch
- Eugene Peterson
- Bret Lott
- Sam Phillips
- Bruce Cockburn
- Luci Shaw
- Scott Cairns
