= Postmodern religion =

Religion influenced by postmodernism

Postmodern religion is any type of religion that is influenced by postmodernism and postmodern philosophies. Examples of religions that may be interpreted using postmodern philosophy include Postmodern Christianity, Postmodern Neopaganism, and Postmodern Buddhism. Postmodern religion is not an attempt to banish religion from the public sphere; rather, it is a philosophical approach to religion that critically considers orthodox assumptions (that may reflect power differences in society rather than universal truths). Postmodern religious systems of thought view realities as plural, subjective, and dependent on the individual's worldview. Postmodern interpretations of religion acknowledge and value a multiplicity of diverse interpretations of truth, being, and ways of seeing. There is a rejection of sharp distinctions and global or dominant metanarratives in postmodern religion, and this reflects one of the core principles of postmodern philosophy. A postmodern interpretation of religion emphasises the key point that religious truth is highly individualistic, subjective, and resides within the individual.

== Eclecticism and non-dogmatic theology ==
According to postmodern philosophy, society is in a state of constant change. There is no absolute version of reality, no absolute truths. Postmodern religion strengthens the perspective of the individual and weakens the strength of institutions and religions that deal with objective realities. Postmodern religion considers that there are no universal religious truths or laws. Rather, reality is shaped by social, historical, and cultural contexts according to the individual, place, and/or time. Individuals may seek to draw eclectically on diverse religious beliefs, practices, and rituals in order to incorporate these into their own religious worldview.

In Japan, Shinto and Buddhist ideas are woven together and coexist. Some people who practice Buddhism may be syncretic in their approach. Syncretism occurs among the Eastern religions. Similarly, versions of Hinduism and Neopaganism may also be interpreted from a postmodern perspective. A postmodern religion can be non-dogmatic, syncretic, and eclectic: in drawing from various faiths and traditions, postmodern religion challenges the notion of absolute truth.

A postmodern interpretation of religion emphasizes the importance of questioning and considering historical bias when studying religion from a historical perspective. For example, doctoral studies in religion at Harvard emphasise studying religion using wider contexts of history and comparative studies. It is these "wider contexts" that make religion a valid subject of postmodern contemplation. Studies of religion are often approached from a historical perspective. A postmodern interpretation of a religion acknowledges that history can be represented in an inherently biased way, reinforcing the mainstream ideologies of those in power.

== Versions of truth ==
Postmodern religion acknowledges and accepts different versions of truth. For example, rituals, beliefs and practices can be invented, transformed, created and reworked based on constantly shifting and changing realities, individual preferences, myths, legends, archetypes, rituals and cultural values and beliefs. Individuals who interpret religion using postmodern philosophy may draw from the histories of various cultures to inform their religious beliefs - they may question, reclaim, challenge and critique representations of religion in history based on the theories of postmodernism, which acknowledge that realities are diverse, subjective and depend on the individual's interests and interpretations.

== Appeal to marginalized groups ==
Members of groups in society who face discrimination or who are marginalized, such as women, the gay community, or ethnic minority groups, may be drawn to postmodern religious thinking. For example, the interpretation of Christianity from a postmodern perspective offers the potential for groups in society, such as the gay community or women, the ability to connect with a version of reality or truth that does not exclude or marginalize them. A postmodern interpretation of religion may focus on considering a religion without orthodox assumptions (that may reflect power differences in society rather than universal truths). In Semitic Neopaganism, a postmodern approach to Neopaganism involves challenging or reclaiming mainstream versions of reality and truth that may be more inclusive of women. Minority groups and the socially or economically disadvantaged may be drawn to follow a postmodern approach to religion because of the way that postmodern philosophy empowers the individual and provides an "emancipatory framework" with which to challenge mainstream ideologies or dominant power structures.

== Postmodern interpretations of religion ==
=== Christianity ===
Interpreting Christianity using theories of postmodernism usually involves finding the balance between acknowledging pluralism, a plurality of views and historical influence on doctrine, and avoiding the extremes of postmodernism. Christian philosopher John Riggs proposes that postmodernism and Christianity have much to offer each other. He asserts that Christians who have adopted elements of postmodern thinking still need to acknowledge that some notions of reality need to be fixed and real in order to have "meaningful claims about vital topics such as ethics and God". An example of a specific religious movement that uses postmodern thinking is the Emerging Church.

=== Neopaganism ===
Neopaganism can be interpreted from a postmodern perspective. Postmodern religion can be non-dogmatic, syncretic, eclectic, and draw from various faiths and traditions and challenges the notion of absolute truths. Wicca, the largest tradition of Neopaganism, can be interpreted using postmodern philosophies. Postmodern interpretations of Wicca often lead to the practitioner adopting a more eclectic approach, because the very nature of postmodern theory involves the acceptance of many versions of truth and reality.

Eclectic Wicca is the most widely adapted form of Wicca in America today and the core philosophies of postmodern thinking are often used in order to form an interpretation of Wicca that is highly individual and characterized by the subjective questioning of reality and truth. This version of Wicca may draw eclectically from, adapt, challenge, and adopt a wider range of religious beliefs and perspectives, such as Buddhism, Shintoism, Druidism, Hinduism, and Goddess movements such as Dianic Wicca, Celtic Wicca, and Semitic Neopaganism.

Postmodern interpretations of Wicca tend to be context driven, egalitarian, immanent and experiential. Academic texts often represent Wicca in literature and research as a specific tradition that is underpinned by discourses of modernism.

== Postmodern spirituality ==
Postmodern spirituality refers to new forms of spirituality in the contexts of postmodern societies in a globalised world. Former universalistic worldviews of modernity become contested, old explanations and certainties questioned.

== See also ==
- Chaos magic
