= Catherine Keller =

American theologian (born 1953)

- Born: 1953 (age 72–73); United States

Education
- Education: Claremont Graduate School, Eden Theological Seminary, University of Heidelberg

Philosophical work
- Era: 20th-century philosophy
- Region: Western philosophy
- School: Feminist Theology; Process Theology; Constructive Theology
- Main interests: theology, process theology, ecology, feminism, poststructuralism

Catherine Keller (born 1953) is a contemporary Christian theologian and Professor of Constructive Theology at Drew University's Graduate Division of Religion. As a constructive theologian, Keller's work is oriented around social and ecological justice, poststructuralist theory, and feminist readings of scripture and theology. Both her early and her late work brings relational thinking into theology, focusing on the relational nature of the concept of the divine, and the forms of ecological interdependence within the framework of relational theology. Her work in process theology draws on the relational ontology of Alfred North Whitehead, fielding it in a postmodern, deconstructive framework.

== Education ==
Keller received a Ph.D. in Philosophy of Religion and Theology from Claremont Graduate School in 1984, a M.Div. from Eden Theological Seminary in 1977, and a Bachelor of Arts (B.A.) equivalent in Theology from University of Heidelberg in 1974.

== Academics ==
Keller's work stresses an interdisciplinary approach, pulling from sub-fields such as feminist thought, environmental thought, and Continental philosophy. She has played a leading role in building interdisciplinary connections into, and out of, the field of theology. Since 2001 she has had a central role in directing and developing Drew University's Transdisciplinary Theological Colloquium. The colloquia seek to "foster a fresh style of theological discourse that is at once self-deconstructive in its pluralism and constructive in its affirmations". Recent colloquia have brought theology into conversation with movements such as Queer Theory and Animal Studies, have offered novel perspectives on debates about Religion and Science, and have explored topics such as political theology. Notable scholars from outside the field of theology who have participated in the colloquia in recent years include: William E. Connolly, Karen Barad, Gayatri Chakravorty Spivak, Daniel Boyarin, and Amy Hollywood.

With John Caputo, Roland Faber and others, Keller provides leadership in the field of theopoetics.

Catherine Keller also has a brother who is a philosopher, Pierre Keller.

== Works ==
=== Books ===
- From a Broken Web: Separation, Sexism and Self. Boston: Beacon Press, 1986. Der Ich-Wahn: Abkehr von einem lebensfeindlichen Ideal.
- Apocalypse Now and Then: A Feminist Guide to the End of the World. Boston: Beacon Press, 1996.
- Face of the Deep: A Theology of Becoming. London: Routledge, 2003.
- God and Power: Counter-Apocalyptic Journeys. Minneapolis: Fortress, 2005.
- On the Mystery: Discerning God in Process. Minneapolis: Fortress, 2008.
- Cloud of the Impossible: Negative Theology and Planetary Entanglement. New York: Columbia University Press, 2015.
- Political Theology of the Earth: Our Planetary Emergency and the Struggle for a New Public. New York: Columbia University Press, 2018.
- Facing Apocalypse: Climate, Democracy and Other Last Chances. Maryknoll, NY: Orbis, 2021.

=== Edited ===
- Process and Difference: Between Cosmological and Poststructuralist Postmodernisms (with Anne Daniell), N.Y.: SUNY, 2002.
- Postcolonial Theologies: Divinity and Empire (with Mayra Rivera and Michael Nausner), St. Louis: Chalice, 2004.
- Toward a Theology of Eros: Transfiguring Passion at the Limits of Discipline (with Virginia Burrus), New York: Fordham Press, 2006.
- The American Empire and the Commonwealth of God: a Political, Economic, Religious Statement (with David R. Griffin, John B. Cobb, Jr,. Richard A. Falk), Louisville: Westminster John Knox Press, 2006.
- Ecospirit: Theologies and Philosophies of the Earth (with Laurel Kearns), New York: Fordham Press, 2007.
- Polydoxy: Theology of Multiplicity and Relation (with Laurel Schneider), New York: Routledge, Taylor & Francis Group (2011).
- Entangled Worlds: Religion, Science, and New Materialisms (with Mary-Jane Rubenstein), New York: Fordham University Press, 2017.

== See also ==
- Christian theology
- Feminist theology
- Theopoetics
- Postmodern Christianity
