= Postmodern theology =

Theological movement

Postmodern theology, also known as the continental philosophy of religion, is a philosophical and theological movement that interprets Christian theology in light of postmodernism and various forms of post-Heideggerian thought, including post-structuralism, phenomenology, and deconstruction.

== History ==
Postmodern theology emerged in the 1980s and 1990s when a handful of philosophers who took philosopher Martin Heidegger as a common point of departure began publishing influential books engaging with Christian theology. Some works of the era include Jean-Luc Marion's 1982 book God Without Being, Mark C. Taylor's 1984 book Erring, Charles Winquist's 1994 book Desiring Theology, John D. Caputo's 1997 book The Prayers and Tears of Jacques Derrida, and Carl Raschke's 2000 book The End of Theology.

There are at least two branches of postmodern theology, each of which has evolved around the ideas of particular post-Heideggerian continental philosophers. Those branches are radical orthodoxy and weak theology.

=== Radical orthodoxy ===
Radical orthodoxy is a branch of postmodern theology that has been influenced by the phenomenology of Jean-Luc Marion, Paul Ricœur, and Michel Henry, among others.

Although radical orthodoxy is informally organized, its proponents often agree on a handful of propositions. First, there is no sharp distinction between reason on the one hand and faith or revelation on the other. In addition, the world is best understood through interactions with God, even though a full understanding of God is never possible. Those interactions include culture, language, history, technology, and theology. Further, God directs people toward truth, which is never fully available to them. In fact, a full appreciation of the physical world is only possible through a belief in transcendence. Finally, salvation is found through interactions with God and others.

Prominent advocates of radical orthodoxy include John Milbank, Catherine Pickstock, and Graham Ward.

=== Weak theology ===
Weak theology is a branch of postmodern theology that has been influenced by the deconstructive thought of Jacques Derrida, including Derrida's description of a moral experience he calls "the weak force." Weak theology rejects the idea that God is an overwhelming physical or metaphysical force. Instead, God is an unconditional claim without any force whatsoever. As a claim without force, the God of weak theology does not intervene in nature. As a result, weak theology emphasizes the responsibility of humans to act in this world here and now. John D. Caputo is a prominent advocate of the movement.

== Disputes ==
In "Pilgrim's Digress: Christian Thinking on and about the Post/Modern Way", theologian Kevin J. Vanhoozer articulates the risk of correlating theology with postmodernism (or any other philosophy or discipline) as undermining the challenging doctrines of the Bible, in effect "exchanging the scandal of the cross for the pottage of intellectual respectability." In this vein, theologian Douglas Groothuis argues that for Christian theology to resist postmodernism, it must adhere to Scripture as propositional truth. In contrast to postmodernism's skepticism towards meta-narratives and its relativistic approach to truth, Scripture should be viewed as objective, universal, and factually accurate. Theologian Chul Min Jun suggests that modernism's conformist tendencies and postmodernism's pluralist inclinations are both rooted in a departure from the Trinity. Using pluralism to overcome conformism and vice versa cannot be transcended by theorizing. Rather than relying solely on language and definitions or on abandoning foundational truths altogether, it is necessary to directly follow the principles of the Triune God.

== Leading thinkers ==
- John D. Caputo
- Richard Kearney
- Mario Kopić
- Jean-Luc Marion
- Françoise Meltzer
- John Milbank
- James Olthuis
- Catherine Pickstock
- Carl Raschke
- Peter Rollins
- Mary-Jane Rubenstein
- James K.A. Smith
- Mark C. Taylor
- Gabriel Vahanian
- Gianni Vattimo
- Charles Winquist
- Catherine Keller
- Mikhail Epstein

== See also ==
- Neo-orthodoxy
- Peter L. Berger
- John Deely, Catholic philosopher and semiotician
- Queer theology
- Religious pluralism
- Talal Asad – British-Pakistani anthropologist (born 1932)
- Richard Bauckham – British theologian (born 1946)
- Craig Bartholomew – South African academic
- Kevin J. Vanhoozer – American theologian and academic (born 1957)
