= Kevin J. Vanhoozer =

American theologian and academic (born 1957)

- Born: March 10, 1957 (age 69); California, U.S.
- Occupation: Biblical academic
- Years active: Contemporary
- Title: Blanchard Professor of Systematic Theology at Wheaton College
- Spouse: Sylvie

Academic background
- Education: Westminster Theological Seminary
- Alma mater: Cambridge University (Ph.D.)
- Thesis: Biblical Narrative in the Philosophy of Paul Ricoeur: A Study in Hermeneutics and Theology
- Doctoral advisor: Nicholas Lash

Academic work
- Discipline: Christian Theology
- Institutions: University of Edinburgh; Wheaton College (Illinois); Trinity Evangelical Divinity School
- Main interests: Hermeneutics and theological interpretation of Scripture, Christian doctrine, Reformed theology, theology of culture

Kevin Jon Vanhoozer (born March 10, 1957) is an American theologian and current Blanchard Professor of Systematic Theology at Wheaton College Graduate School. Much of Vanhoozer's work focuses on systematic theology, hermeneutics, and postmodern theology.

== Biography ==
Vanhoozer received his M. Div. from Westminster Theological Seminary in Philadelphia and a Ph.D. from Cambridge University, where he studied under Nicholas Lash. His interdisciplinary dissertation was titled Biblical Narrative in the Philosophy of Paul Ricoeur: A Study in Hermeneutics and Theology, published in 1990 (reprint 2007) by Cambridge University Press (ISBN 0-521-04390-5).

He joined the faculty of Trinity Evangelical Divinity School in 1986, but during two periods since has taught elsewhere. From 1990 to 1998, he was Senior Lecturer at New College, University of Edinburgh; from 2009 to 2012, he was Blanchard Professor of Theology at Wheaton College. He returned to TEDS in 2012.

Vanhoozer is the Senior Theological Mentor for the St. Augustine Fellowship of the Center for Pastor Theologians and Senior Fellow in Systematic Theology for the C. S. Lewis Institute. He and his wife Sylvie have two daughters. He maintains a web page, "The Theophilus Project", at www.kevinjvanhoozer.com.

Douglas Sweeney and Daniel Treier edited a Festschrift in his honor, Hearing and Doing the Word: The Drama of Evangelical Hermeneutics, published in 2021 by T&T Clark (ISBN 9780567702197) and consisting of essays by his former teachers and students and present colleagues.

== Academic contributions ==
Vanhoozer has written several books, including The Drama of Doctrine: A Canonical-Linguistic Approach to Christian Theology, which won the Christianity Today 2006 Book Award for best book in theology, and Faith Speaking Understanding: Performing the Drama of Doctrine, which won the Christianity Today 2015 Book Award for best book in theology. He has edited several others, including the Gold Medallion Book Award winner Dictionary for Theological Interpretation of the Bible, The Cambridge Companion to Postmodern Theology, and, with Charles A. Anderson and Michael J. Sleasman, Everyday Theology: How to Read Cultural Texts and Interpret Trends.

In his work Is There a Meaning in this Text?, Vanhoozer gives an in-depth response to the challenges of Deconstructionism to biblical hermeneutics. Primarily, he engages the thinking of Jacques Derrida, but Stanley Fish and Richard Rorty also receive attention. Vanhoozer develops a theory of communicative action that relies strongly on the speech-act theory of J. L. Austin, in which a biblical text is seen as a communicative act involving "locutions" (the text itself), "illocutions" (the stance of the author to the locution, e.g. questioning, asserting, promising, etc.), and "perlocutions" (the goals that the author hopes to accomplish through the text).

Among the conclusions that Vanhoozer draws from viewing a text as a communicative act are the involvement of the author, text, and reader in the process of interpretation. The intended meaning of the author can be discerned to a certain degree from the text. The text (langue and parole) is not an arbitrary "playground" but part of a covenantal relationship between all people. As a result, the intention of the author can be adequately decoded. Another consequence is that the reader/interpreter has a responsibility to honor the intentions of the author and try to interpret the text in a way which re-creates the author's intended meaning. This responsibility is coupled with a freedom to determine the significance in the context of the interpreter's community.

== Works ==
=== Books ===
- Vanhoozer, Kevin Jon (1990). Biblical Narrative in the Philosophy of Paul Ricoeur (Ph.D). Cambridge: Cambridge University Press. ISBN 978-0-5213-4425-8.
- ——— (1998). Is There a Meaning in this Text? The Bible, the Reader, and the Morality of Literary Knowledge. Grand Rapids, MI: Zondervan. ISBN 978-0-3102-1156-3.
- ——— (2002). First Theology: God, Scripture & Hermeneutics. Downers Grove, IL: IVP. ISBN 978-0-8308-2681-0.
- ——— (2005). The Drama of Doctrine: A Canonical-linguistic Approach to Christian Theology. Louisville, KT: Westminster, John Knox Press. ISBN 978-0-6642-2327-4.
- ——— (2010). Remythologizing Theology: Divine Action, Passion, and Authorship. Cambridge: Cambridge University Press. ISBN 978-0-5214-7012-4.
- ——— (2014). Faith Speaking Understanding: Performing the Drama of Doctrine. Louisville, KT: Westminster, John Knox Press. ISBN 978-0-6642-3448-5.
- ———; Strachan, Owen (2015). The Pastor as Public Theologian: Reclaiming a Lost Vision. Grand Rapids, MI: Brazos. ISBN 978-0-8010-9771-3.
- ———; Treier, Daniel (2016). Theology and the Mirror of Scripture: A Mere Evangelical Account. Studies in Christian Doctrine and Scripture. Downers Grove, IL: IVP Academic. ISBN 978-1-7835-9400-9.
- ——— (2016). Pictures at a Theological Exhibition: Scenes of the Church's Worship, Witness, and Wisdom. Downers Grove, IL: IVP Academic.
- ——— (2016). Biblical Authority after Babel: Retrieving the Solas in the Spirit of Mere Protestant Christianity. Grand Rapids, MI: Brazos.
- ——— (2019). Hearers and Doers: A Pastor's Guide to Making Disciples through Scripture and Doctrine. Bellingham, WA: Lexham.
- ——— (2024). Mere Christian Hermeneutics: Transfiguring What It Means to Read the Bible Theologically. Grand Rapids, MI: Zondervan.

=== Edited works ===
- ———, ed. (1996). The Trinity in a Pluralistic Age: Theological Essays on Culture and Religion. Grand Rapids, MI: Eerdmans. ISBN 978-0-8028-4117-9.
- ———, ed. (2001). Nothing Greater, Nothing Better: Theological Essays on the Love of God. Grand Rapids, MI: Eerdmans. ISBN 978-0-8028-4902-1.
- ———, ed. (2003). Cambridge Companion to Postmodern Theology. Cambridge: Cambridge University Press. ISBN 978-0-5217-9062-8.
- ———; Bartholomew, Craig G.; et al., eds. (2005). Dictionary for Theological Interpretation of the Bible. Grand Rapids, MI: Baker Academic. ISBN 978-0-2810-5780-1.
- ———; Smith, James K. A.; et al., eds. (2006). Hermeneutics at the Crossroads. Indiana Series in the Philosophy of Religion. Bloomington, IN: Indiana University Press. ISBN 978-0-2532-1849-0.
- ———, ed. (2007). Everyday Theology: How to Read Cultural Texts and Interpret Trends. Grand Rapids, MI: Baker Academic. ISBN 978-0-8010-3167-0.
- ———; Warner, Martin, eds. (2007). Transcending Boundaries in Philosophy and Theology: Reason, Meaning and Experience. Farnham, Surrey: Ashgate Publishing. ISBN 978-0-7546-5324-0.
- ———; Bartholomew, Craig G.; et al., eds. (2008). Theological Interpretation of the Old Testament: A Book-by-Book Survey. Grand Rapids, MI: Baker Academic. ISBN 978-0-2810-6101-3.
- ———; Lugioyo, Brian; et al., eds. (2014). Reconsidering the Relationship between Biblical Theology and Systematic Theology in the New Testament. Tübingen: Mohr Siebeck. ISBN 978-3-1615-2719-7.
- ———; et al., eds. (2016). New Dictionary of Theology (2nd exp. & rev. ed.). Downers Grove, IL: IVP Academic. ISBN 978-0-8308-2455-7.

=== Articles and chapters ===
- ——— (March 2005). "Lost in Interpretation? Truth, Scripture, and Hermeneutics". Journal of the Evangelical Theological Society. 48 (1): 89–114.
- ——— (Fall 2015). "Putting on Christ: Spiritual Formation and the Drama of Discipleship". Journal of Spiritual Formation and Soul Care. 8 (2).
- ——— (Fall 2017). "Love without Measure? John Webster's Unfinished Dogmatic Account of the Love of God". International Journal of Systematic Theology. 19 (4): 505–26. doi:10.1111/ijst.12252.
- ——— (2018). "Sola Scriptura, Tradition, and Catholicity in the Pattern of Theological Authority". In Dockery, David S.; Massey, James; Smith, Jr., Robert (eds.). Worship, Tradition, and Engagement: Essays in Honor of Timothy George. London: Wipf and Stock Publishers. pp. 109–128. ISBN 9781498248945. OCLC 1018458403.

=== Online writings ===
- Types of Postmodern Theology (PDF), an excerpt from the Cambridge Companion to Postmodern Theology. Archived from the original on 8 August 2017
- Hyperactive Hermeneutics: Is the Bible Being Overinterpreted?
- Vanhoozer's response to Kostenberger's review of The Drama of Doctrine

=== Audio ===
- The Stage, the Story and the Script (MP3), Asbury Theological Seminary, March 15, 2007
- Doing Church: The Theater of the Gospel (MP3), Asbury Seminary, March 16, 2007
- The Strange New Status Symbol of the Cross (MP3), Wheaton College, March 19, 2008
- What has Vienna to do with Jerusalem? Barth, Brahms, and Bernstein's Unanswered Question (RealMedia)
