= James Olthuis =

American theologian

- Born: James Herman Olthuis; 1938 (age 87–88)

Academic background
- Education: Calvin College; Calvin Theological Seminary; VU University Amsterdam
- Thesis: Facts, Values, and Ethics (1968)
- Doctoral advisor: André Troost
- Influences: H. Evan Runner

Academic work
- Discipline: Theology; philosophy
- Sub-discipline: Philosophical theology
- School or tradition: Postmodernism
- Institutions: Institute for Christian Studies
- Notable students: James K. A. Smith

A vision of and for love: Towards a Christian post-postmodern worldview (article developed from a paper delivered at the Koers-75 Conference on 'Worldview and Education', held in Potchefstroom, South Africa, from 30 May to 2 June 2011)

James Herman Olthuis (born 1938) is an interdisciplinary scholar in ethics, hermeneutics, philosophical theology, as well as a theorist and practitioner of psychotherapy of a kind he calls "relational psychotherapy".

== Life ==
Olthuis studied under H. Evan Runner in philosophy at Calvin College, Grand Rapids, Michigan; then in theology at Calvin Theological Seminary; and finally in philosophical ethics at VU University, Amsterdam, where he received his Doctor of Philosophy degree under André Troost in 1968. Olthuis analyzed and critiqued the works of G. E. Moore, his dissertation being entitled Facts, Values, and Ethics: A Confrontation with 20th Century British Moral Philosophy.

== Positions held ==
Olthuis was a senior member at the Institute for Christian Studies in Toronto from 1968 to 2004 and continues to hold an emeritus position there.

== Bibliography ==
- (1968) Facts, Values and Ethics
- (1975) I Pledge You My Troth
- (1986) Keeping our Troth: Staying in Love During the Five Stages of Marriage
- (1987) A Hermeneutics of Ultimacy
- (1997) Knowing Other-wise: Philosophy on the Threshold of Spirituality, ed.
- (2000) Towards an Ethics of Community, ed.
- (2002) Religion With/out Religion: The Prayers and Tears of John D. Caputo, ed.
- (2003) The Beautiful Risk: A New Psychology of Loving and Being Loved
- (2005) Radical Orthodoxy and the Reformed Tradition: Creation, Covenant, and Participation, ed. with James K.A. Smith

== Works about Olthuis ==
- (2006) The Hermeneutics of Charity: Interpretation, Selfhood, and Postmodern Faith

== See also ==
- Deconstruction
- List of thinkers influenced by deconstruction
- Postmodern theology
- Radical orthodoxy
- Christian psychology
