= Constructive theology =

Constructive theology is the redefinition or reconceptualization of what historically has been known as systematic theology.

== Purpose ==
The reason for this reevaluation stems from the idea that, in systematic theology, the theologian attempts to develop a coherent theory running through the various doctrines within the tradition (Christology, eschatology, pneumatology, etc.). A potential problem underlying such study is that in constructing a system of theology, certain elements may be "forced" into a presupposed structure, or left out altogether, in order to maintain the coherence of the overall system.

== Use of the term and relevant publications ==
In response to these perceived problems, some modern theologians, especially Christian feminists such as Sallie McFague, Catherine Keller, and Sharon V. Betcher, feel that the term systematic is no longer accurate in reference to theology, and prefer the language of constructive theology. However, constructive theologians vary as to whether they reject the term systematic altogether, with the term systematic continuing to be preferred especially by Roman Catholics. While not a proponent of the language of constructive theology, Karl Barth frequently criticized the practice of systematizing theology or structuring a coherent system upon a philosophical foundation external to theology's own internal commitments. Constructive theology tends to be interdisciplinary, imaginative, open-ended, public facing, lay-led, and practical.

The term constructive theology has been in use mostly since the 1980s. Constructive Theology is also the title of a journal on the subject. A Bloomsbury book series on constructive theology, titled Rethinking Theologies, Constructing Alternatives, is edited by Marion Grau, Susannah Cornwall, Steed Davidson, and Hyo-Dong Lee. This has included Cornwall's Un/familiar Theology, Jan-Olav Henriksen's Christianity as Distinct Practices, an edited volume entitled What is Constructive Theology? by Marion Grau and Jason Wyman, Shelli M. Poe's The Constructive Promise of Schleiermacher's Theology, and a volume on Resisting Theologies and the Everyday edited by Wren Radford.

== See also ==
- Charles Hodge
- John B. Cobb
- Langdon Gilkey
- Gordon D. Kaufman
- Progressive Christianity
- Catherine Keller
