= James K. A. Smith =

Canadian-American philosopher (born 1970)

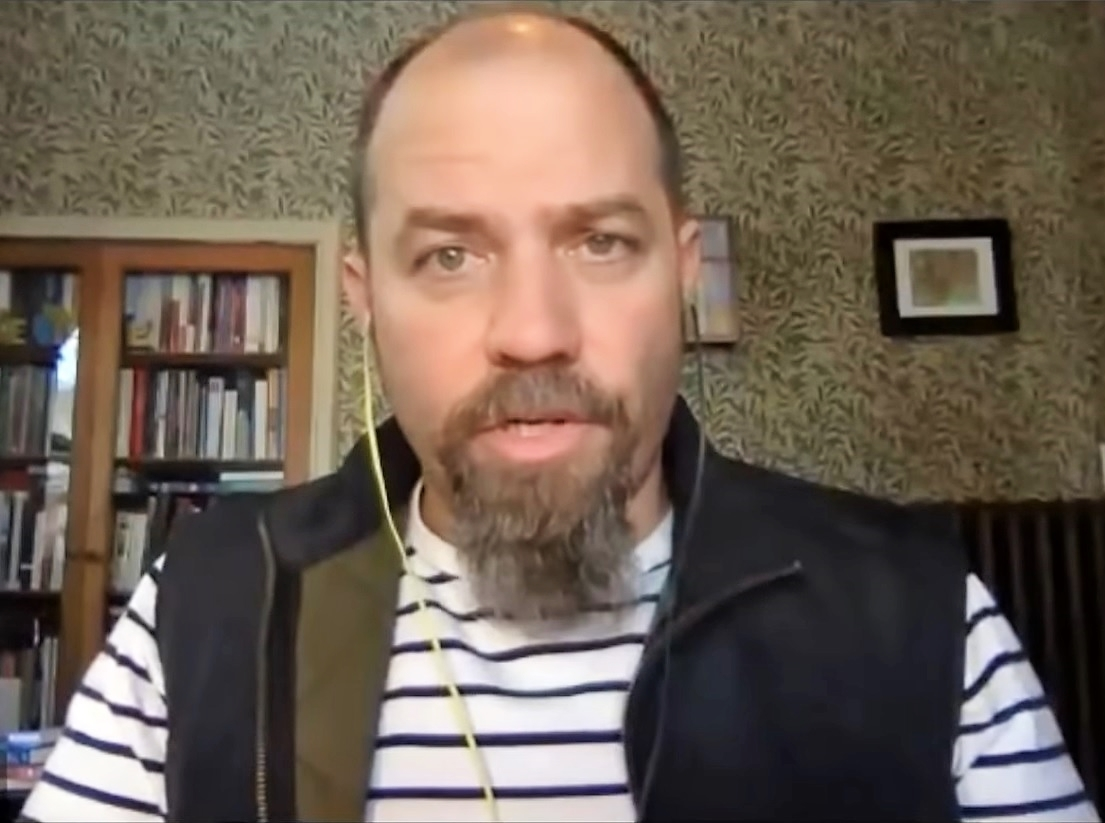
- Smith on Rebel Wisdom in 2019
- Born: James Kenneth Alexander Smith; October 9, 1970 (age 56); Embro, Ontario, Canada

Academic background
- Education: Emmaus Bible College; Institute for Christian Studies; Villanova University
- Thesis: How to Avoid Not Speaking (1999)
- Doctoral advisor: John D. Caputo
- Other advisor: James Olthuis
- Influences: Augustine of Hippo; John Calvin; Abraham Kuyper; John Milbank; Oliver O'Donovan; Catherine Pickstock; Alvin Plantinga; Calvin Seerveld; Charles Taylor

Academic work
- Discipline: Philosophy
- School or tradition: Continental philosophy; postmodern Christianity; reformational philosophy
- Institutions: Loyola Marymount University; Calvin University
- Main interests: Hermeneutics; philosophical theology; philosophy of social science; secularity
- Website: jameskasmith.com

James Kenneth Alexander Smith (born October 9, 1970) is a Canadian-American philosopher who is currently Professor of Philosophy at Calvin University, holding the Gary & Henrietta Byker Chair in Applied Reformed Theology & Worldview. He is a former editor-in-chief of the literary journal Image.

== Early life and education ==
Smith was born on October 9, 1970, in Embro, Ontario. He completed his undergraduate studies at the University of Waterloo and Emmaus Bible College. He earned a Master of Philosophy degree in philosophical theology in 1995 at the Institute for Christian Studies where he studied under James Olthuis. He went on to receive a Doctor of Philosophy degree in 1999 from Villanova University where he was advised by John D. Caputo. After teaching for a short time at Loyola Marymount University, Smith accepted his current position at Calvin University.

He currently resides in Grand Rapids, Michigan, and is a senior fellow at the Trinity Forum.

== Work ==
Smith's published work addresses topics including philosophy, theology, ethics, aesthetics, science, and politics. His work has been described as drawing on continental philosophy and the Augustinian tradition of theological cultural critique, including the writings of Augustine of Hippo, John Calvin, Jonathan Edwards and Abraham Kuyper. As of this date, his stated interest is in bringing critical thought to bear on the practices of the church and the church's witness to culture, culminating in the need to interpret and understand what he has called "cultural liturgies".

Smith has argued that theology—or, more specifically, the narrative of the church—is capable of responding to modernism. His popular writings discuss postmodernism and radical orthodoxy for an evangelical readership. Though he is critical of the emergent church movement, he is at the same time sympathetic to much that could be described as part of that movement. Smith argues that some philosophical and ecclesial approaches described as postmodern continue to reflect assumptions associated with the Enlightenment. Smith has argued that moving away from historic ecclesial tradition is a mistake and has advocated long-term commitment to Christian communities and engagement with historic Christian orthodoxy as post- or counter-modern practices.

His research interests reflect his background in continental philosophy and the theology of the Reformed and Pentecostal traditions. Smith's research topics range from the continental philosophy of religion to urban altruism to the relationship between science and theology.

== Bibliography ==
- Smith, James KA (2000) The Fall of Interpretation: Philosophical Foundations for a Creational Hermeneutic. ISBN 978-0-83081574-6
- –––(2002) Speech and Theology: Language and the Logic of Incarnation. ISBN 978-0-41527695-5
- (2004) 101 Key Terms in Philosophy and Their Importance for Theology, with Kelly James Clark & Richard Lints. ISBN 978-0-66422524-7
- (2004) Introducing Radical Orthodoxy: Mapping a Post-secular Theology, foreword by John Milbank. ISBN 978-0-80102735-2
- Jean-Luc Marion (2004) The Crossing of the Visible, translator.
- (2004) The Hermeneutics of Charity: Interpretation, Selfhood, and Postmodern Faith (festschrift for James Olthuis), editor with Henry Isaac Venema. ISBN 978-1-58743113-5
- (2005) Jacques Derrida: Live Theory. ISBN 978-0-82646280-0
- (2005) Radical Orthodoxy and the Reformed Tradition: Creation, Covenant, and Participation, editor with James Olthuis. ISBN 978-0-80102756-7
- (2006) Hermeneutics at the Crossroads, editor with Bruce Ellis Benson & Kevin J. Vanhoozer. ISBN 978-0-25334746-6
- (2006) Who's Afraid of Postmodernism? Taking Derrida, Lyotard, and Foucault to Church, The Church and Postmodern Culture series. ISBN 978-0-80102918-9
- (2008) After Modernity? Secularity, Globalization, and the Reenchantment of the World, editor. ISBN 9781602580688
- (2009) The Devil Reads Derrida: and Other Essays on the University, the Church, Politics, and the Arts. ISBN 9780802864079
- (2009) Desiring the Kingdom: Worship, Worldview, and Cultural Formation, Cultural Liturgies series vol. 1. ISBN 9780801035777
- (2010) Thinking in Tongues: Pentecostal Contributions to Christian Philosophy. ISBN 9780802861849
- (2010) Science and the Spirit: A Pentecostal Engagement with the Sciences, editor with Amos Yong. ISBN 9780253355164
- (2010) Letters to a Young Calvinist: An Invitation to the Reformed Tradition. ISBN 9781587432941
- (2011) Teaching and Christian Practices: Reshaping Faith and Learning, editor with David I. Smith. ISBN 9780802866851
- (2012) The Fall of Interpretation: Philosophical Foundations for a Creational Hermeneutic, second edition. ISBN 9780801039720
- (2013) Imagining the Kingdom: How Worship Works, Cultural Liturgies series vol. 2. ISBN 9780801035784
- (2013) Discipleship in the Present Tense: Reflections on Faith and Culture. ISBN 1937555089
- (2014) Who's Afraid of Relativism? Community, Contingency, and Creaturehood, The Church and Postmodern Culture series. ISBN 978-0-80103973-7
- (2014) How (Not) to Be Secular: Reading Charles Taylor. ISBN 0-80286761-8
- (2016) You Are What You Love: The Spiritual Power of Habit. ISBN 978-1-58743380-1
- (2017) Awaiting the King: Reforming Public Theology, Cultural Liturgies series vol. 3. ISBN 0-80103579-1
- (2019) On the Road with Saint Augustine: A Real-World Spirituality for Restless Hearts. ISBN 978-1-58743389-4
- (2021) The Nicene Option: An Incarnational Phenomenology ISBN 978-1481313728
- (2022) How to Inhabit Time: Understanding the Past, Facing the Future, Living Faithfully Now. ISBN 1-58743523-3
- (2026) Make Your Home in This Luminous Dark: Mysticism, Art, and the Path of Unknowing ISBN 978-0-300-27976-4

== See also ==
- Cardus
- List of thinkers influenced by deconstruction
- Philosophy in Canada
- List of University of Waterloo people
