= Richard Lints =

Theology professor and Presbyterian minister

- Occupations: Professor, author, theologian, pastor
- Notable work: The Fabric of Theology, Renewing the Evangelical Mission
- Spouse: Ann
- Children: Kate, Sarah, Lucas
- Theological work
- Language: English
- Tradition or movement: Evangelical, Reformed
- Main interests: Calvinism, Evangelicalism, Biblical Theology, Just War

Richard Lints is the Senior Distinguished Professor of Theology and author at Gordon-Conwell Theological Seminary's Hamilton Campus. Lints has been with Gordon-Conwell Theological Seminary since 1986.

He has also taught at Trinity College in Bristol, England, and from 1999 to 2000 he was visiting professor at Yale University. Lints is ordained in the Presbyterian Church in America. He is also a regular contributor to the Modern Reformation magazine, the Center for Gospel and Culture, and The Gospel Coalition.

Lints received his B.A. from Westminster College (Philosophy/Religion), A.M. from the University of Chicago (Theology), M.A. from the University of Notre Dame (Philosophy) and Ph.D. from the University of Notre Dame (Philosophy). He has also taught at Trinity College, Bristol, Yale Divinity School, the University of Notre Dame, Westminster Theological Seminary and Reformed Theological Seminary.

== Works ==
=== Books ===
- The Fabric of Theology, Grand Rapids: William B Eerdmans Publishing Company, 1993, ISBN 0802806740
- Clark, Kelly; Lints, Richard; Smith, James (2004), 101 Key Terms in Philosophy and Their Importance for Theology, Louisville: Westminster John Knox Press, ISBN 0664225241
- Lints, Richard; Horton, Michael; Talbot, Mark, eds. (2006), Personal Identity in Theological Perspective, Grand Rapids: William B Eerdmans Publishing Company, ISBN 0802828930
- Progressive and Conservative Religious Ideologies, Farnham: Ashgate Publishing, 2010, ISBN 978-1409406440
- Lints, Richard, ed. (2011), Renewing the Evangelical Mission, Wm. B. Eerdmans, ISBN 978-0802869302

=== Journal articles ===
- Lints, Richard (1986), "Attempts to Bridge the Gap in the Tertia Via", Southern Journal of Philosophy, XXIV (4): 531–540, doi:10.1111/j.2041-6962.1986.tb01588.x
- "Two Theologies or One? Warfield and Vos on the Nature of Theology", Westminster Journal of Theology, 54 (2): 235–253, 1992
- Lints, Richard (1993), "The Postpositivist Choice: Tracy or Lindbeck", Journal of the American Academy of Religion, 61 (4): 655–677, doi:10.1093/jaarel/lxi.4.655, JSTOR 1465057
