= Daniel Treier =

American biblical scholar (1972–2025)

Daniel J. Treier (September 29, 1972 – December 22, 2025) was an American biblical scholar and theologian. He served as Gunther H. Knoedler Professor of Theology at Wheaton College.

Treier grew up near Bloomdale, Ohio and studied at Cedarville University and Grand Rapids Theological Seminary, before obtaining a PhD at Trinity Evangelical Divinity School under Kevin J. Vanhoozer. Like Vanhoozer, Treier specialized in theological interpretation of the Bible, and wrote Introducing Theological Interpretation of Scripture: Recovering a Christian Practice (2008), Introducing Evangelical Theology (2019), and Lord Jesus Christ (2023).
