= Guestbook Project =

Boston College non-profit organization

The Guestbook Project
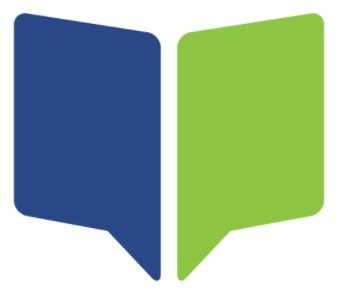
- "Promoting the power of digital storytelling as a means of healing divisions."
- Founders: Richard Kearney and Sheila Gallagher
- Founded at: Chestnut Hill, Massachusetts
- Type: Nonprofit
- Headquarters: Boston College
- Location: Chestnut Hill, United States
- Members: Anne Bernard Kearney, Moya Coulson, David Goodman, Jared Highlen, Fanny Howe, Sarah Kearney, Sarit Larry, Jim Morley, Brian O’Donovan, John Peto, Robert Savage, Yolande Steenkamp, James Taylor, Brian Treanor
- Board of directors: Elise Zoli, Petra Belkovic, Aidan Browne, Jean Duff, Paul Freaney, Mark Goodman, Joe Lambert, Esther Mombo, Siddhartha, Sue Schardt
- Key people: Richard Kearney, Sheila Gallagher, Peter Klapes, Melissa Fitzpatrick, Elise Zoli
- Affiliations: European Center for the Study of War and Peace, teaching divided histories, School in a Box, Story Center, Global Unites, Utopia 500, Forum for Cities in Transition, Psychology and the Other, The Irish American Partnership, Boston College, Narrative 4, nervecentre
- Students: Noah Valdez, Urwa Hameed, Angelos Bougas
- Website: https://guestbookproject.org/

The Guestbook Project is an international, non-profit housed at Boston College and directed by Richard Kearney and Sheila Gallagher. Its mission is to transform hostility into hospitality through conversation and conflict resolution.

== History ==
The Guestbook Project began ten years with the intention of using the power of storytelling to heal divided communities and societies around the world. To that end, Guestbook often features conversations of people from dissenting backgrounds, and attempts to have them share their side of the story, listen to the other side, and eventually come to “invent a new story together.” The Guestbook Project has recorded several stories from divided groups around the world, including: Mitrovica (Kosovo), Derry (Northern Ireland), Jerusalem (Israel/Palestine), Bangalore (India), Dokdo (Japan/Korea), Cape Town (South Africa), and the Mexican-American border (El Centro). At the moment, the Guestbook Project has over sixty storybites and documentaries on its online platform; the most recent of which being, Sheltering Strangers, which depicts the story of a Greek orphanage for Syrian refugee children.

== Guestbook team ==
| Title | Name |
|---|---|
| Co-Director | Richard Kearney |
| Co-Director | Sheila Gallagher |
| Executive Manager | Peter Klapes |
| Director of Pedagogy | Melissa Fitzpatrick |
| Director of Media | Kevin Sweet |
| Assistant Director of Media | Jared Highlen |

== Publications ==
Books

Radical Hospitality: From Thought to Action (Fordham University Press, 2020)

Hosting the Stranger: Between Religions (Continuum, 2011)

Phenomenologies of the Stranger: Between Hostility and Hospitality (Fordham University Press, 2020)

Traversing the Heart: Journeys of the Inter-religious Imagination (Brill 2010)

On Hosting The Stranger: The New Arcadia Review Vol. 4 (Guestbook 2009)

Hospitality: Imagining the Stranger (Religion and the Arts 2009)

Articles

Double Hospitality—Between Word and Touch By Richard Kearney In Journal for Continental Philosophy of Religion, 1 (2019)

Linguistic Hospitality—The Risk of Translation By Richard Kearney In Research in Phenomenology, 49 (2019)

Race, pre-college philosophy, and the pursuit of a critical race pedagogy for higher education By Melissa Fitzpatrick In Ethics and Education (2018)

Across oceans: A conversation on otherness, hospitality and welcoming a strange God By Richard Kearney, Daniël P. Veldsman, and Yolande Steencamp In Debating Otherness with Richard Kearney: Perspectives from South Africa, ed. Yolande Steenkamp and Daniël P. Veldsman (2018)

Hospitality: Possible or Impossible? By Richard Kearney In Hospitality and Society, Numbers 2 & 3, Volume 5, eds. Paul Lynch, Alison McIntosh, and Jennie Germann Molz (2015)

Hospitality, the Foundation of Dialogue By Richard Kearney In The Japan Mission Journal, ed. Joseph O’Leary (Autumn 2014)

Two Prophets of Eucharistic Hospitality By Richard Kearney In The Japan Mission Journal, ed. Joseph O’Leary (Spring 2014)

Translating Across Faith Cultures: Radical Hospitality By Richard Kearney In Perspectiva Nova Eco-Ethics, Revue internationale de philosophie moderne, Acta institutionis philosophiae et aestheticae, ed. Y. Ilmamichi (2014)

The Hermeneutics of the Gift: A Dialogue with Eric Severson By Richard Kearney and Eric R. Severson In Gift and Economy: Ethics, Hospitality and the Market, ed. Eric Severson (2012)

Beyond Conflict: Radical Hospitality and Religious Identity By Richard Kearney In Philosophy and the Return of Violence: Studies from this Widening Gyre, ed. Chris Yates and Nathan Eckstrand (2011)

Imagining the Sacred Stranger: Hostility or Hospitality? By Richard Kearney In Politics and the Religious Imagination, ed. Jens Zimmerman (2010)

Welcoming the Stranger By Richard Kearney In All Changed? Culture and Identity in Contemporary Ireland, The Fifth Seamus Heaney Lecture Series, eds. Padraig O Duibhir, Rory Mc Daid and Andrew O’Shea (2011)

Images of Strangers By Richard Kearney In Engage, ed. Karen Raney (2004)

Strangers and Others: From Deconstruction to Hermeneutics By Richard Kearney In Critical Horizons, 3, 1 (2002)

Interviews

Intercultural encounters as hospitality: An interview with Richard Kearney By Breffni O’Rourke In Journal of Virtual Exchange, Vol 1 (2018)

We have learned from Covid how much we miss touch By Joe Humphreys In The Irish Times (2021)

== Storybites ==
Storybites is a Guestbook project aimed at having people share stories that led to a surprising shift in their perspective. Participants in the project record a short conversation about some epiphany that they had with a member from a dissenting group, and those videos are then featured on Guestbook's online platform.
