= Jeffrey Overstreet =

American novelist

- Born: Portland, Oregon, U.S.
- Occupations: Novelist; movie critic; teacher
- Writing career
- Genres: Science fiction, fantasy
- Notable works: Auralia's Colors, Through a Screen Darkly
- Website: lookingcloser.org

Jeffrey Overstreet is an American novelist, film critic, and professor who resides in Shoreline, Washington.

== Biography ==
Overstreet is an associate professor of English and writing at Seattle Pacific University. His film reviews and essays have been published in Image: A Journal of the Arts and Religion, Bright Wall/Dark Room, Paste, Christianity Today, Comment, Christ and Pop Culture, and Seattle Pacific University's Response magazine. His work has also been highlighted in TIME magazine. In 2007, Overstreet received the Spiritus Award at the City of the Angels Film Festival in recognition of his writing on cinema. Students at Seattle Pacific voted him Undergraduate Professor of the Year in 2024.

== Critical reception ==
Through A Screen Darkly earned a "Starred Review" from Publishers Weekly. Filmmaker Darren Aronofsky has said of the book that it is "Inspirational ... sometimes all of us forget that love for movies, that internal spark inside us that movies lit, and your book is going to remind many of us about it."

Lost and Found in the Cathedral of Cinema was praised by The New Yorker's film critic Justin Chang: “There are writers who astound me with the depth of their love and knowledge of cinema. And there are writers who pursue the truth and beauty of the divine, and reject the ignorance of the doctrinaire, with a rigor that inspires me beyond words. Jeffrey Overstreet is the very rare writer who does both.” The book also features words of recommendation from filmmakers Andrew Stanton, Tomm Moore, Scott Teems, and Chad Hartigan, memoirist Kathleen Norris, and young adult novelist Sara Zarr.

== Selected bibliography ==
- — (2007). Auralia's Colors. Waterbrook Press. ISBN 978-1-4000-7252-1. OCLC 123955154.
- — (2008). Cyndere's Midnight. WaterBrook. ISBN 978-1-4000-7253-8. OCLC 231834319.
- — (2010). Raven's Ladder. WaterBrook Press. ISBN 978-1-4000-7467-9. OCLC 779208050.
- — (2010). Through A Screen Darkly. ReadHowYouWant. ISBN 978-1-4596-3943-0. OCLC 864758913.
- — (2011). The Ale Boy's Feast. Water Brook Press. ISBN 978-1-4000-7468-6. OCLC 1090210170.
- — (2026). Lost and Found in the Cathedral of Cinema. Broadleaf Books. ISBN 978-1-5064-9694-8. OCLC 1090210170.
