= John D. Caputo =

American philosopher

- Born: John David Caputo; October 26, 1940 (age 85); Philadelphia, Pennsylvania, US

Education
- Education: La Salle University (BA); Villanova University (MA); Bryn Mawr College (PhD)

Philosophical work
- Era: 20th-century philosophy
- Region: Western philosophy
- School: Continental philosophy; phenomenology; postmodern Christianity
- Institutions: Villanova University; Syracuse University
- Doctoral students: James K. A. Smith
- Notable students: Theodore George
- Main interests: Hermeneutics; ethics; mysticism; theology; deconstruction
- Notable ideas: Weak theology; radical hermeneutics
- Website: https://johndcaputo.com/

John David Caputo (born October 26, 1940) is an American philosopher who is the Thomas J. Watson Professor of Religion Emeritus at Syracuse University and the David R. Cook Professor of Philosophy Emeritus at Villanova University. Caputo is a major figure associated with postmodern Christianity and continental philosophy of religion, as well as the founder of the theological movement known as weak theology. Much of Caputo's work focuses on hermeneutics, phenomenology, deconstruction, and theology.

== Education ==
Caputo received his B.A. in 1962 from La Salle University, his M.A. in 1964 from Villanova University, and his Ph.D. in philosophy in 1968 from Bryn Mawr College.

== Work ==
Caputo is a specialist in contemporary continental philosophy, with a particular expertise in phenomenology, hermeneutics, and deconstruction. Over the years, he has developed a deconstructive hermeneutics that he calls radical hermeneutics, which is highly influenced by the thought of the French philosopher Jacques Derrida. Additionally, Caputo has developed a distinctive approach to religion that he calls weak theology. Recently, his most important work has been to rebut the charges of relativism made against deconstruction by showing that deconstruction is organised around the affirmation of certain unconditional ethical and political claims.

Caputo has a special interest in continental approaches to the philosophy of religion. Some of the ideas Caputo investigates in his work include the "religion without religion" of Jacques Derrida; the "theological turn" taken in recent French phenomenology by Jean-Luc Marion and others; the critique of ontotheology; the dialogue of contemporary philosophy with Augustine of Hippo and Paul of Tarsus; and medieval metaphysics and mysticism. In the past, Caputo has taught courses on Søren Kierkegaard, Friedrich Nietzsche, Edmund Husserl, Martin Heidegger, Emmanuel Levinas, Gilles Deleuze, and Jacques Derrida.

== Positions held ==
Caputo taught philosophy at Villanova University from 1968 to 2004. He was appointed the David R. Cook Professor of Philosophy at Villanova University in 1993. Caputo was the Thomas J. Watson Professor of Religion at Syracuse University, where he taught in both the departments of philosophy and religion from 2004 until his retirement in 2011. He is emeritus professor at both Villanova University and Syracuse University and continues to write and lecture in both the United States and Europe. He is active in the American Philosophical Association, the American Academy of Religion, the Society for Phenomenology and Existential Philosophy and he chairs the board of editors for the Journal for Cultural and Religious Theory.

== Bibliography ==
- 1978: The Mystical Element in Heidegger's Thought (Ohio University Press)
- 1982: Heidegger and Aquinas (Fordham University Press)
- 1986: The Mystical Element in Heidegger's Thought (Fordham University Press paperback with a new "Introduction")
- 1987: Radical Hermeneutics: Repetition, Deconstruction and the Hermeneutic Project (Indiana University Press)
- 1993: Against Ethics - Contributions to a Poetics of Obligation with Constant Reference to Deconstruction (Indiana University Press)
- 1993: Demythologizing Heidegger (Indiana University Press)
- 1997: The Prayers and Tears of Jacques Derrida (Indiana University Press)
- 1997: Deconstruction in a Nutshell: A Conversation with Jacques Derrida, ed./auth. (Fordham University Press)
- 2000: More Radical Hermeneutics: On Not Knowing Who We Are (Indiana University Press)
- 2001: On Religion (Routledge Press)
- 2006: Philosophy and Theology (Abingdon Press)
- 2006: The Weakness of God (Indiana University Press)
- 2007: After the Death of God, with Gianni Vattimo (Columbia University Press)
- 2007: How to Read Kierkegaard (Granta; Norton, 2008)
- 2007: What Would Jesus Deconstruct?: The Good News of Postmodernism for the Church (Baker Academic)
- 2013: The Insistence of God: A Theology of Perhaps (Indiana University Press)
- 2014: Truth [Philosophy in Transit] (Penguin)
- 2015: Hoping Against Hope: Confessions of a Postmodern Pilgrim (Fortress Press)
- 2015: The Folly of God: A Theology of the Unconditional (Polebridge Press)
- 2018: Hermeneutics: Facts and Interpretation in the Age of Information (Pelican)
- 2018: The Essential Caputo: Selected Writings, ed. B. Keith Putt (Indiana University Press)
- 2019: Cross and Cosmos: A Theology of Difficult Glory (Indiana University Press)
- 2020: In Search of Radical Theology: Expositions, Explorations, Exhortations (Fordham University Press)
- 2021: The Collected Philosophical and Theological Papers, Volume 3 [1997-2000]: The Return of Religion, ed. Eric Weislogel (John D. Caputo Archives)
- 2022: The Collected Philosophical and Theological Papers, Volume 1 [1969-1985]: Aquinas, Eckhart, Heidegger: Metaphysics, Mysticism, Thought, ed. Eric Weislogel (John D. Caputo Archives)
- 2022: Specters of God: An Anatomy of Apophatic Imagination (Indiana University Press)
- 2022: The Collected Philosophical and Theological Papers, Volume 2 [1986-1996]: Hermeneutics and Deconstruction, ed. Eric Weislogel (John D. Caputo Archives)
- 2023: The Collected Philosophical and Theological Papers, Volume 4 [2001-2004]: Continental Philosophy of Religion, ed. Eric Weislogel (John D. Caputo Archives)
- 2023: What to Believe? Twelve Brief Lessons in Radical Theology (Columbia University Press)
- 2024: The Collected Philosophical and Theological Papers, Volume 5 [2005-2007]: Coming Out as a Theologian, ed. Eric Weislogel (John D. Caputo Archives)

== See also ==
- Khôra
- List of American philosophers
- List of deconstructionists
