= Mark C. Taylor (philosopher) =

American philosopher (born 1945)

Academic background
- Education: Wesleyan University (BA); Harvard University (PhD)

Academic work
- Discipline: Religious studies
- Institutions: Williams College; Columbia University

Mark C. Taylor (born 13 December 1945) is a postmodern religious and cultural critic. He has published more than twenty books on theology, metaphysics, art and architecture, media, technology, economics, and postmodernity.

== Biography ==
After graduating from Wesleyan University in 1968, he received his doctorate in the study of religion from Harvard University and began teaching at Williams College in 1973. He attained Preston S. Parish Third Century Professor of Humanities in the mid-1980s, and at the time of his departure in 2007 was Cluett Professor of Humanities.

In 2007, Taylor moved from Williams College to Columbia University, where he chaired the Department of Religion until 2015. He has also held visiting appointments at Harvard University, Smith College, University of North Carolina, and University of Sydney.

== Work ==
Taylor's first book, Kierkegaard’s Pseudonymous Authorship: A Study of Time and the Self was published by Princeton University Press in 1975. This was followed in 1980 by the work for which Taylor received his Doctorate, Journeys to Selfhood: Hegel and Kierkegaard (University of California Press; reissued by Fordham University Press in 2000). Taylor's early study of Kierkegaard and Hegel forms the foundation for all his subsequent work.

In the early 1980s, Taylor began exploring the texts of Jacques Derrida and his most important followers. Erring: A Postmodern A/Theology (University of Chicago Press, 1984) was one of the earliest attempts to study religion from the standpoint of poststructuralist philosophy and was followed by two closely related works, the sourcebook Deconstruction in Context: Literature and Philosophy (Chicago, 1986) and Altarity (Chicago, 1987). In 1989, Taylor founded the Religion and Postmodernism series at the University of Chicago Press as a forum for translations and new scholarship. It ended publication in 2018.

During the late 1980s, Taylor was drawn into debates about architecture and the visual arts, and in 1992 published a theological study of religious twentieth-century visual arts, Disfiguring: Art, Architecture and Religion. In later essays and books, Taylor considers a broad range of artists: Mark Tansey, Michael Heizer, Richard Serra, Fred Sandback, Ann Hamilton, Joseph Beuys and others. His extensive work on architecture includes essays on Peter Eisenman, Bernard Tschumi, Daniel Liebeskind, Robert Venturi, Frank Gehry, and Frank Lloyd Wright.

While writing on the visual arts, Taylor became interested in media and new information technologies. In 1992 he and Esa Saarinen, a Finnish philosopher, taught the first global seminar using teleconferencing technology. Their book, Imagologies: Media Philosophy (Routledge, 1994) grew out of this seminar. The book's unusual design in turn inspired the Finnish design company, Marimekko, to develop a product line derived from pages of the book. Taylor's subsequent book, Hiding (Chicago, 1997), extended the use of graphic design to create hypertextual effects within the limits of a conventional bound book. As a companion to Hiding, Taylor and José Marquez issued a CD-ROM video game entitled The Réal – Las Vegas, Nevada.

While Taylor was exploring art and new media, he extended his experiments with technology in the classroom. In 1993, he was awarded the Rector's Medal by the University of Helsinki and in 1995 the Carnegie Foundation named him the national Professor of the Year for his innovative teaching. In 1998, Taylor and New York investment banker Herbert Allen, Jr., founded Global Education Network, whose mission was to provide high-quality, low-cost online education in the liberal arts, humanities, and sciences.

Taylor's work with technology led to a growing interest in the expanding fields of network theory and scientific studies of complex adaptive systems. In a series of books--The Picture in Question: Mark Tansey and the Ends of Representation (Chicago, 1999), The Moment of Complexity (Chicago, 2001), and Confidence Games: Money and Markets in a World Without Redemption (Chicago, 2004)--Taylor deploys complexity theory to explore a range of social, cultural and economic developments.

Taylor's interest in the visual arts and graphic design has led to his own artistic experiments. In Grave Matters (Reaktion, 2002), Taylor and Dietrich Christian Lammerts collaborated on a book featuring Lammerts's photographs of the graves of one hundred and fifty modern writers, theologians, philosophers, artists and architects. In 2003, Taylor expanded this project beyond the format of the book to create an exhibition at the Massachusetts Museum of Contemporary Art, which included not only the photographs but also sculpture and video art. In 2006, Taylor published Mystic Bones, featuring forty of Taylor's own photographs of deer, cattle and elk bones, accompanied by aphorisms and an essay, "Rubbings of Reality," on the place of deserts in the imagination. More recently, Taylor has been creating a complex work of art entitled "NeXus," which includes land art, and stone, bone, and steel sculptures. In the summer of 2016 he co-curated an exhibition at the Sterling and Francine Clark Art Institute in Williamstown, MA entitled "Sensing Place: Reflections on Stone Hill." NeXus was part of this exhibition. His book Recovering Place: Reflections on Stone Hill (Columbia University Press, 2014) was the catalog for this show.

Taylor's work attempts to give sustained attention to the theological, cultural, and artistic issues that were framed in Europe in the late eighteenth and early nineteenth centuries. Taylor's After God, published in the fall of 2007 (University of Chicago Press), weaves together the many strands of his oeuvre.

Taylor's additional books include: Refiguring the Real: In Conversation with William Gaddis, Richard Powers, Mark Danielewski, and Don DeLillo (Columbia University Press, 2013), Refiguring the Spiritual: Beuys, Barney, Turrell, Goldsworthy (Columbia University Press, 2012), Speed Limits: Where Time Went And Why We Have So Little Left (Yale, 2014), Last Works: Lessons in Leaving (Yale, 2018), and Abiding Grace: Time, Modernity, Death (University of Chicago Press, 2018) On August 31, 2010, Taylor published Crisis on Campus: A Bold Plan for Reforming Our Colleges and Universities (Knopf, ISBN 0-307-59329-0), in which he identified and analyzed major problems facing higher education.

In addition to his own writing, Taylor has been involved in a number of editorial projects. In the late 1970s, he chaired the Research and Publications Committee of the American Academy of Religion, which initiated a series of major publishing programs. The Religion and Postmodernism book series he founded continues at the University of Chicago Press under the editorship of Thomas A. Carlson. Taylor has also edited a textbook, Critical Terms for the Study of Religion (Chicago, 1998), designed for college courses on method in religious studies.

== Criticisms ==
In 2009, Taylor wrote a New York Times op-ed piece entitled "End the University As We Know It" (Apr. 27), in which he advocated the end of tenure and academic departments. He followed it up with a book in which he expanded on his reform, Crisis on Campus: A Bold Plan for Reforming Our Colleges and Universities (Knopf, 2010). Critics accused Taylor of hypocrisy, writing as a tenured Columbia professor drawing annual salary and benefits estimated at over $200,000, and charged him, after a career spent in elite private colleges, of being out of touch with the work loads and pay packets of faculty at non-elite institutions.

== Personal life ==
Mark Taylor was a close friend of Jacques Derrida. When Derrida died on October 8, 2004, the New York Times published a highly critical obituary of the philosopher. Taylor felt that the obituary was not an accurate reflection of Derrida, and proceeded to write another obituary, which the Times published a few days later.

Taylor was raised as a Presbyterian.

== Bibliography ==
- (1975) Kierkegaard's Pseudonymous Authorship: A Study of Time and the Self
- (1976) Religion and the Human Image
- (1981) Unfinished...: Essays in Honor of Ray L. Hart
- (1982) Deconstructing Theology
- (1986) Deconstruction in Context (ISBN 9780226791401)
- (1987) Erring: A Postmodern A/theology (ISBN 9780226791425)
- (1987) Altarity, University of Chicago Press, Chicago and London 1987 ISBN 978-0-226-79138-8
- (1990) Tears (ISBN 9780791401033)
- (1992) Disfiguring: Art, Architecture, and Religion (ISBN 9780226791333)
- (1993) Nots (ISBN 9780226791319)
- (1994) Imagologies: Media Philosophy (ISBN 9780415103381)
- (1997) Hiding (ISBN 9780226791593)
- (1997) Daniel Libeskind: Radix Matrix
- (1998) Critical Terms for Religious Studies (ISBN 9780226791579)
- (1998) The Real, Las Vegas, NV (ISBN 9780913697221)
- (1999) About Religion: Economies of Faith in Virtual Culture (ISBN 9780226791623)
- (1999) The Picture in Question: Mark Tansey and the Ends of Representation (ISBN 9780226791296)
- (2000) Journeys to Selfhood: Hegel and Kierkegaard
- (2002) Vito Acconci
- (2003) The Moment of Complexity: Emerging Network Culture (ISBN 9780226791180)
- (2004) Grave Matters (ISBN 9781861891174)
- (2006) Confidence Games (ISBN 9780226791685)
- (2006) Mystic Bones (ISBN 9780226790374)
- (2007) After God (ISBN 9780226791692)
- (2009) Field Notes from Elsewhere: Reflections on Dying and Living (ISBN 9780231147804)
- (2010) Crisis on Campus: A Bold Plan for Reforming Our Colleges and Universities (Knopf, ISBN 0-307-59329-0)
- (2012) Refiguring the Spiritual: Beuys, Barney, Turrell, Goldsworthy
- (2013) Rewiring the Real: In Conversation with William Gaddis, Richard Powers, Mark Danielewski, and Don DeLillo
- (2014) Recovering Place: Reflections on Stone Hill
- (2014) Speed Limits: Where Time Went and Why We Have So Little Left
- (2018) Last Works: Lessons in Leaving
- (2018) Abiding Grace: Time, Modernity, Death
- (2020) Seeing Silence
- (2020) Intervolution: Smart Bodies Smart Things (No Limits)
- (2025) After the Human: A Philosophy for the Future

== See also ==
- Deconstruction
- List of thinkers influenced by deconstruction
- List of Christian theologians
