= Caruth =

Caruth may refer to:

== Places ==
- Caruth, Missouri, unincorporated community in Dunklin County

== People ==
- Asher G. Caruth (1844–1907), American Congressman from Kentucky
- Cathy Caruth, American academic
- Don Caruth (1950–2010), American politician from West Virginia
- Rajah Caruth (born 2002), American racing driver

== See also ==
- Carruth (disambiguation)
