= Affect theory =

Theory that seeks to organize subjective feelings into discrete categories

Affect theory may refer to theories from philosophy, psychology, or the humanities. Definitions and applications vary across psychology, psychoanalysis, neuroscience, medicine, interpersonal communication, literary theory, critical theory, media studies, and gender studies, among other fields.

In psychology, affect is a theory that seeks to organize affects, sometimes used interchangeably with emotions or subjectively experienced feelings, into discrete categories and to typify their physiological, social, interpersonal, and internalized manifestations.

Psychological affect theory is usually attributed to the psychologist Silvan Tomkins, introduced in the first two volumes of his book Affect Imagery Consciousness (1962). Tomkins uses the concept of affect to refer to the "biological portion of emotion," defined as the "hard-wired, preprogrammed, genetically transmitted mechanisms that exist in each of us," which, when triggered, precipitate a "known pattern of biological events". However, it is also acknowledged that, in adults, the affective experience is a result of interactions between the innate mechanism and a "complex matrix of nested and interacting ideo-affective formations."

== Affect theory in psychology ==
=== Silvan Tomkins's nine affects ===
According to the psychologist Silvan Tomkins, there are nine primary affects. Tomkins characterized affects by low/high intensity labels and by their physiological expression:

Positive:

- Enjoyment/Joy (reaction to success/impulse to share) – smiling, lips wide and out
- Interest/Excitement (reaction to new situation/impulse to attend) – eyebrows down, eyes tracking, eyes looking, closer listening

Neutral:

- Surprise/Startle (reaction to sudden change/resets impulses) – eyebrows up, eyes blinking

Negative:

- Anger/Rage (reaction to threat/impulse to attack) – frowning, a clenched jaw, a red face
- Disgust (reaction to bad taste/impulse to discard) – the lower lip raised and protruded, head forward and down
- Dissmell (reaction to bad smell/impulse to avoid – similar to distaste) – upper lip raised, head pulled back
- Distress/Anguish (reaction to loss/impulse to mourn) – crying, rhythmic sobbing, arched eyebrows, mouth lowered
- Fear/Terror (reaction to danger/impulse to run or hide) – a frozen stare, a pale face, coldness, sweat, erect hair
- Shame/Humiliation (reaction to failure/impulse to review behaviour) – eyes lowered, the head down and averted, blushing

=== Prescriptive applications ===
According to Tomkins, optimal mental health involves maximizing positive affects and minimizing negative affects. Affect should also be properly expressed so to make the identification of affect possible to others.

Affect theory is also used prescriptively in investigations about intimacy and intimate relationships. Kelly describes relationships as agreements to work collaboratively toward maximizing positive affect and minimizing negative affect. Like the "optimal mental health" blueprint, this blueprint requires that members of the relationship express affect to one another in order to identify progress.

These blueprints can also describe natural and implicit goals. For example, Donald Nathanson uses the "affect" to create a narrative for one of his patients:

I suspect that the reason he refuses to watch movies is the sturdy fear of enmeshment in the affect depicted on the screen; the affect mutualization for which most of us frequent the movie theater is only another source of discomfort for him. ... His refusal to risk the range of positive and negative affect associated with sexuality robs any possible relationship of one of its best opportunities to work on the first two rules of either the Kelly or the Tomkins blueprint. Thus, his problems with intimacy may be understood in one aspect as an overly substantial empathic wall, and in another aspect as a purely internal problem with the expression and management of his own affect.

Tomkins claims that "Christianity became a powerful universal religion in part because of its more general solution to the problem of anger, violence, and suffering versus love, enjoyment, and peace.".

Affect theory is also referenced heavily in Tomkins's script theory.

=== Attempts to typify affects in psychology ===
Humor is a subject of debate in affect theory. In studies of humor's physiological manifestations, humor provokes highly characteristic facial expressions. Some research has shown evidence that humor may be a response to a conflict between negative and positive affects, such as fear and enjoyment, which results in spasmodic contractions of parts of the body, mainly in the stomach and diaphragm area, as well as contractions in the upper cheek muscles. Further affects that seem to be missing for Tomkins's taxonomy include relief, resignation, and confusion, among many others.

The affect joy is observed through the display of smiling. These affects can be identified through immediate facial reactions that people have to a stimulus, typically well before they could process any real response to the stimulus.

The findings from a study on negative affect arousal and white noise by Stanley S. Seidner "support the existence of a negative affect arousal mechanism through observations regarding the devaluation of speakers from other Spanish ethnic origins".

== Critical theory ==
Affect theory is also explored in philosophy, psychoanalytic theory, gender studies, and art theory. Cultural theorists Eve Sedgwick, Lauren Berlant, Elizabeth Povinelli, and Sara Ahmed have been described as "affect theorists" who write from critical theory perspectives. They define affects as "structures of feeling", a concept borrowed from the socialist writer Raymond Williams. A structure of feeling is a framework for thinking about meanings as they are actively lived and felt, through elements such as impulse, restraint, and tone. Berlant describes affect as a "sense of a shared affective quality through which the present is rendered sensible and apprehended." Critical theorist Ahmed describes affect as "sticky" in her essay "Happy Objects" to explain the sustained connection between "ideas, values, and objects." Ahmed and Ann Cvetkovich use affect to indicate "public feelings," or feelings that emerge and develop in dialogue with social and political structures of power and within and among communities.

A political and relational theory of emotion, it is also influenced from some strands of Marxist autonomists including Franco Berardi, Michael Hardt and Antonio Negri, as well as Marxist feminists such as Selma James and Silvia Federici, who consider the cognitive and material manifestations of particularized gendered, performed roles including caregiving. Affect is also treated as central in capitalist systems, including people's attachment to commodities and "dreams" of class mobility. In addition, the non-discursive and non-deliberative attributes of affect may produce social interactions and experiences that are non-reducible to specific endpoints, and at times may allow people to experience new modes of existence separated from their main life goals.

Scholars who explored affect theory as an approach to art include Ruth Leys and Charles Altieri. In “The Turn to Affect”, Leys explained how the shift to the “neuroscience of emotions” based on the affect theory has a deleterious effect of equating precognitive, nonrational responses to critical and reflective insights. She maintained that there are no precognitive insights, nothing that acts as inhuman, presubjective, visceral forces, and intensities that shape our thoughts and judgments. Affect theory is part of Altieri's critique of contemporary literary criticism, which he believes is obsessed with historical and socio-political critiques. For him, this focus leads to “over-readings” of meaning. Instead, he focused on affect in relation to aesthetic experience. In his conceptualization, Altieri used the term “rapture” to explain the aesthetics of effects. He also drew from cognitive and neuroscience studies to distinguish “affect” or “feeling” and “emotion”.

== Interpersonal communication ==
This nonverbal mode of conveying feelings and influence is held to play a central role in intimate relationships. The Emotional Safety model of couples therapy seeks to identify the affective messages that occur within the couple's emotional relationship (the partners' feelings about themselves, each other, and their relationship); most importantly, messages regarding (a) the security of the attachment and (b) how each individual is valued.

One practical application of affect theory has been its incorporation into couples therapy. Two characteristics of affects have powerful implications for intimate relationships:

1. According to Tomkins, a central characteristic of affects is affective resonance, which refers to a person's tendency to resonate and experience the same affect in response to viewing a display of that affect by another person, sometimes thought to be "contagion". Affective resonance is considered to be the original basis for all human communication (before there were words, there was a smile and a nod).
2. Also according to Tomkins, affects provide a sense of urgency to the less powerful drives. Thus, affects are powerful sources of motivation. In Tomkins' words, affects make good things better and bad things worse.

== Criticism ==
Some scholars have taken issue with the claims and methodologies of affect theorists. Ruth Leys has objected to affect theory's implications for artistic and literary criticism, as well as to its appropriation in some forms of trauma theory. Aubrey Anable has also criticised affect theory for its imprecision, claiming that its "language of intensity, becoming, and in-betweenness and its emphasis on the unpresentable give it a maddening incoherence, or shade too easily into purely subjective responses to the world". Jason Josephson Storm, a professor of religious studies, argued that affect theory in the humanities has failed to distinguish itself from poststructuralism and ignores empirical evidence that affects are culturally constructed.

== See also ==
- Selective exposure theory
- Mood management theory
- Affect consciousness
