= Cathy Caruth =

American academic (born 1955)

Professor Cathy Caruth
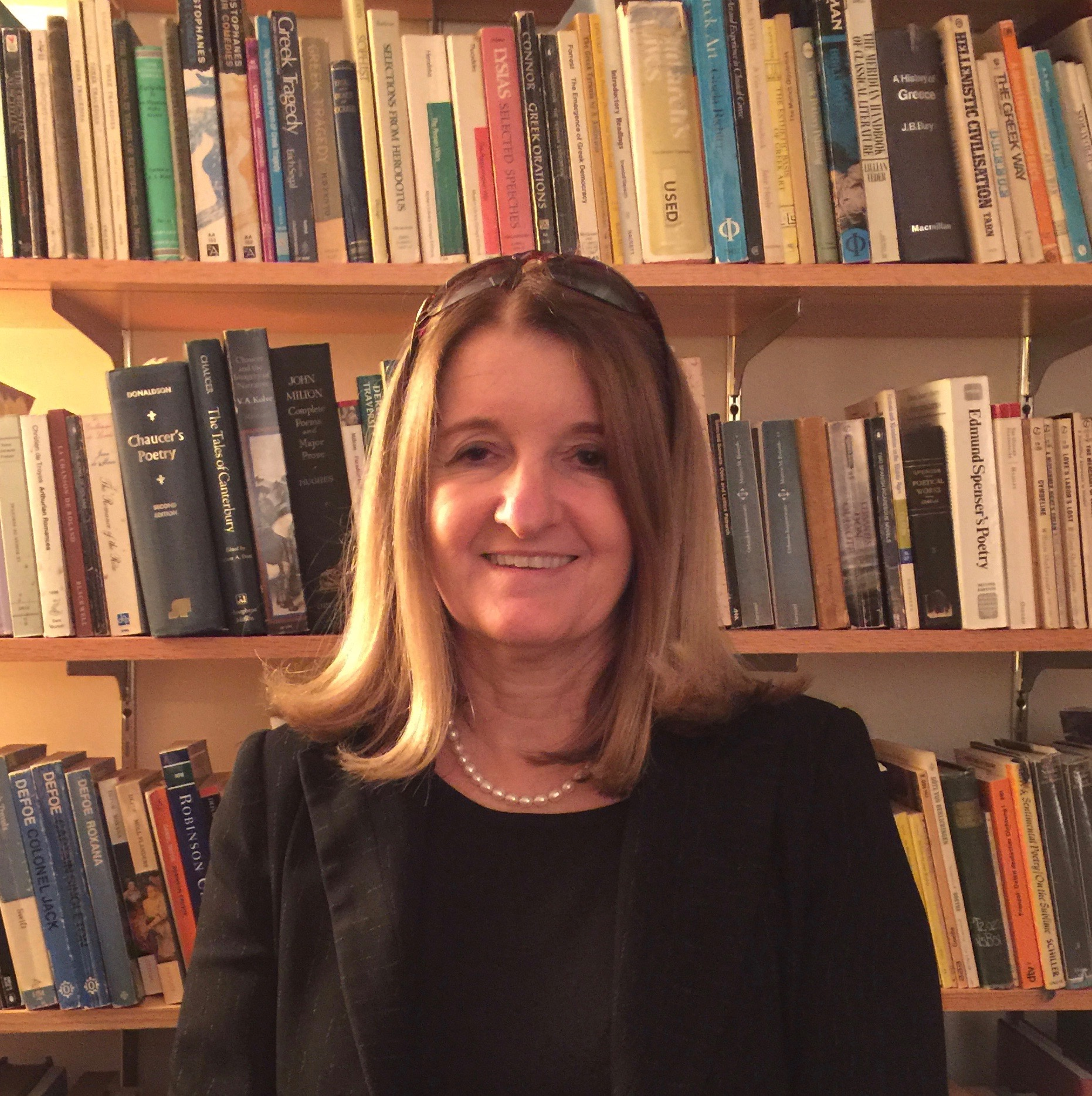
- Caruth in 2017
- Born: Catherine Lynne Caruth; January 1, 1955 (age 71)
- Years active: 1983–present
- Known for: Unclaimed Experience (1996)
- Title: Class of 1916 Professor of English
- Awards: Fellow of the American Academy of Arts and Sciences (2026)

Academic background
- Education: Princeton University (1977); Yale University (1988)
- Alma mater: Yale University
- Thesis: Empirical truths and critical fictions: Locke, Wordsworth, Kant, Freud (1988)
- Doctoral advisor: Geoffrey H. Hartman
- Other advisor: Paul de Man

Academic work
- Discipline: Comparative literature; English studies
- School or tradition: Yale school
- Institutions: Yale University (1986–1995); Emory University (1995–2011); Cornell University (2011–present)
- Main interests: Psychoanalytic theory; Trauma; Poetry analysis
- Notable ideas: Latency; Double wound

Cathy Caruth (born 1955) is an American scholar and literary critic whose writings have been influential in trauma studies, a field that explores the impact of trauma in literature and society by analyzing its psychological, rhetorical, and cultural significance. Her research has explored how testimony and language survive historical trauma. Psychiatrist Robert Jay Lifton, M.D. has described her as one of the most innovative scholars in trauma studies, a field she has been credited with partly creating. (Note: "Jonathan Culler, the Class of 1916 Professor of English and Comparative Literature, noted: 'Cathy Caruth was one of the first to realize the importance of trauma theory for the humanities....Exploring trauma as a model for thinking about relations between history and experience, her books have made her a leader in this field which she partly created.'")

== Early life and education ==
Caruth's mother was Elaine J. Caruth, a psychoanalyst and Clinical Professor of Psychiatry at UCLA. Her mother was Jewish and her father was not. Despite her mother's heritage, her family was somewhat assimilated and they celebrated Christmas. She has noted that she only realized she was writing about Judaism when she was halfway through completing an essay on Sigmund Freud's Moses and Monotheism. While she does not point to a specific traumatizing event, she has stated that a personal experience from her childhood could be an underlying influence on her research into trauma and history. (Note: "[U]ndoubtedly, a personal experience from my own childhood could be an influence in all of this [my lifelong professional body of work and intellectual engagement with trauma theory]. But it's not something that was on my mind when I was doing it [traumawork]." -Caruth)

When Caruth was young, she was involved in junior high school peace marches and war moratoria during the Vietnam War. She has suggested that this early exposure to the war and political protests may somehow be related to her later academic interest in trauma. (Note: "[W]hen I was very young, I was very involved in junior high school peace marches, and war moratoria and things like that. It really was very important to me at that age. And so there may be a way in which that element had something to do with my interest in trauma later on." -Caruth)

Caruth graduated cum laude from Princeton University, majoring in Comparative Literature. She then pursued her education in the Economic Planning Board (EPB), in Korea, which she completed in 1979. Later, she studied for two months in Italy, then in 1988 completed her PhD at Yale University in Comparative Literature.

== Career ==
Caruth has held positions at Yale, Emory, and Cornell Universities. She is currently Class of 1916 Professor of English. She has contributed to journals like American Imago and PMLA, and she has served as a contributing editor for multiple academic publications. She has held visiting positions at Cambridge, Princeton, Toronto, and Kansas Universities. Having garnered over 25,000 citations, with an h-index of 32, (Note: An h-index of 32 is exceptionally high for a humanities scholar, where citation rates are typically lower than in the natural or social sciences.) her work has been translated into at least twelve languages.

From 1986 to 1995 Caruth was assistant professor of English at Yale, where she taught a course titled "Literature, Trauma and Culture," which was the subject of a 1991 New York Times article about her teaching. She continued to offer this curriculum throughout her subsequent appointments. She has said that she views the classroom as a dynamic space of interaction, and she has described the goal of engaging with students and global scholars as a continuous effort to find language for what hasn't been said. (Note: "[O]ne thing that keeps me engaged is everybody else, students coming from everywhere, and people from other parts of the world introducing new ideas....I'm intrigued by what would happen with people thinking new things, often in other parts of the world....[Trauma] is coming from elsewhere. Maybe there's something unresolved there and people are essentially saying: 'look, we have yet to say what needs to be said.' I like that. -Caruth) Her research and teaching were situated within the context of the Yale school of Deconstruction; however, Caruth moved beyond the Yale school by exposing convergences between deconstructive ideas, history, and human psychology. (Note: "[T]rauma theory...is related to...what is thought of as 'deconstructive reading.'...[B]oth trauma and deconstruction are a rethinking of history. And for me they intersect around these questions: the problem of the referent, and the problem of historicity....[I]f we speak of trauma as 'belonging to' the 1990s, it means that you understand the conceptual and writing sequences to be alignable with the empirical temporal sequences....But can thought really be aligned with that temporal structure? That is...very important." -Caruth)

Between 1995 and 1998 Caruth played a significant role in building the Department of Comparative Literature at Emory, serving as the program's director and becoming the Department Chair in 2006. During this time, she also helped develop an archive of Holocaust testimony. Her work in this area was influenced by her time at Yale, where she witnessed the founding of the Video Archive for Holocaust Testimonies.

In 1996 JHUP published Caruth's second monograph, Unclaimed Experience: Trauma, Narrative, and History, which has been incorporated into curricula across psychoanalysis, history, philosophy, and law. She argued trauma is not the event but the mind's failure to process it, producing "latency" where it returns belatedly as flashbacks or nightmares. She defines trauma as follows:

Trauma describes an overwhelming experience of sudden, or catastrophic events, in which the response to the event occurs in the often delayed, and uncontrolled repetitive occurrence of hallucinations and other intrusive phenomena. (Note: Caruth has also defined trauma using personified shorthand: "I tend to think of the word 'trauma' as saying: 'You don't get me, I am not yet, I am out of context.' Or: 'Wake up! Don't you see I'm burning?' Then you wake up and it is already too late; you have missed the burning." -Caruth)

This delay leaves traumatic histories "unclaimed," persisting through haunting. Caruth extended trauma beyond individuals, viewing history as interconnected traumas linking personal and collective memory. Unclaimed Experience was released in a 20th-anniversary edition in 2016.

Caruth's work is usually done "without any direct contact with people who are traumatized". Primarily a theorist rather than a clinical practitioner or scientist, she has influenced and collaborated with psychiatrists, such as Dori Laub and Robert Jay Lifton, shaping understanding of how the mind processes trauma and how history records it. Caruth has described herself as a literary critic and empathetic receiver of testimonies who does not claim to have medical or psychological expertise in treating trauma. (Note: "As a literary critic, and as an individual engaged in a new mode of listening across disciplines, I make no claim to clinical expertise in the area of trauma[.]" -Caruth)

It has been said that one of Caruth’s most seminal achievements was shifting the foundation of psychoanalytic history from a male-dominated "father-son" model to a female-centered "mother-daughter" dynamic. By creating a space for female voices to articulate trauma and memory, she has been credited with disrupting a traditional record that had effectively erased women.

In 2010 Caruth was appointed as the M.H. Abrams Distinguished Visiting Professor in English at Cornell University. In 2011 she held a Mellon Visiting Fellowship at the University of Cambridge, where she was based at the Centre for Research in the Arts, Social Sciences and Humanities and delivered a lecture titled "Lying and History" in March of that year. (Note: This lecture was published in translation in the Japanese journal Misuzu (みすず): Caruth, Cathy (April 2011). "嘘と歴史 (上)". Misuzu. 53 (4). Translated by Shimokobe, Michiko. Misuzu Shobo: 14–27.) She joined Cornell as the Franklin H.T. Rhodes Professor of Humane Letters in 2011. She was the Whitney J. Oates Fellow at Princeton in 2013. In 2020, Caruth was named Class of 1916 Professor of English at Cornell, a professorship previously held by Jonathan D. Culler (1982–2020) and M.H. Abrams (1973–1983).

Caruth was elected to the American Academy of Arts and Sciences in 2026.

== Other projects ==
Caruth has maintained a research and teaching focus on Romanticism, John Milton, and philology. In her 2010 afterword for PMLA, she framed the future of literary criticism as a "turning back" that is essentially philological. (Note: "[L]iterary criticism, as philology, must be understood as a survival that not only repeats but also transmits a loss of language itself[.]...In philo-logia, the longing evoked by the word..., emerges another figure, I would suggest, a figure that turns us back, once again, to the future of literature." -Caruth) Her engagement with these fields is reflected in her contributions to Studies in Romanticism, Romantic Circles, and Philological Quarterly, as well as her university teaching. She has taught seminars on Milton, exploring how parallelism is used in Paradise Lost to create ambiguity that troubles representation, in addition to courses that trace the influence of Milton on Romantic poets, examining how dreams and poems may provide a framework for understanding the human condition.

In 2017, Caruth co-launched The Ape Testimony Project, an interdisciplinary initiative considering the intersection of language and non-human experience. She participated in workshops and public forums at Cornell on the subject of primates and the ethics of cross-species communication and sustainability. In addition, she co-taught an online seminar focused on communication between apes and between humans and apes. In 2025, she gave a presentation on the intergenerational legacy of Kanzi the bonobo, in which she examined how the "encounter" between humans and bonobos creates a new language that cannot be the object of a single discipline.

=== International engagements ===
Caruth's study of trauma has brought her global distinction and recognition.

In 2018 she appeared on Ukrainian media in an interview for Hromadske in which she brought her academic theories into a real-world dialogue with a society actively undergoing a period of intense conflict and historical re-evaluation.

In 2020 she gave a virtual presentation at St Berchmans College Changanassery on Trauma Theory and the problem of address, drawing on Shoshana Felman and the Eichmann Trial to describe trauma's return as involuntary repetition which acts as a command to understand what was initially ungraspable, compelling survivors into a new mode of witness that bridges death and life. This built upon work published in Paragraph (journal) in 2017.

Caruth participated in a webinar hosted by the Centre for the Study of the Afterlife of Violence and the Reparative Quest (AVReQ) at Stellenbosch University in 2020 titled "The Future of Trauma: African Scholars Thinking with Cathy Caruth," which served as the inaugural event for a Trauma Studies Group series aimed at interrogating and expanding Western Trauma Theory through African perspectives. A group of early-career African scholars engaged with Caruth to examine the language and transmission of trauma, how the physical body registers trauma, new ways of expressing traumatic experiences in drama and performance, and transgenerational healing.

== Responses and critiques ==
Over the decades since its publication, Caruth's work in Trauma Theory has elicited a spectrum of scholarly critique, with some suggesting that Caruth's core arguments constitute a theoretical fiction that is unsupported by empirical neurobiology.

In her 2000 book Trauma: A Genealogy, as well as subsequent essays and interviews, Professor Ruth Leys (Johns Hopkins University) observed that elements of Caruth's framework introduce a certain fluidity in how victimhood is understood, potentially complicating distinctions between victims and those involved in acts of violence. Leys has reflected on whether Caruth's approach might, in certain interpretations, allow perpetrators to be viewed through the lens of their own unclaimed suffering. Leys argued that Caruth's model treated trauma as an unprocessed event that is stored in memory but not "remembered" in the normal way. It returns as flashbacks or nightmares exactly as it happened, without being integrated into the person's conscious understanding. Leys believed this idea comes more from theoretical frameworks than actual clinical observations. According to Leys, Caruth's theory produced an over-generalized, ahistorical picture of trauma as universal breakdown of meaning, conducive to speculation.

In his 2001 book Writing History, Writing Trauma, Professor Dominick LaCapra, a Cornell historian, argued that Caruth's writing on trauma often uses an indirect and disorienting style. (Note: "Emulative writing becomes especially open to question when it takes an unmodulated orphic, cryptic, indirect, allusive form that may render or transmit the disorientation of trauma but provide too little a basis for attempts to work it through even in symbolic terms....One may at times sense such movements in Cathy Caruth's writing. One remarkable use of the term precisely, along with paradoxically, in her writing comes precisely when the thought is least precise and most perplexing, perhaps at times disoriented[.]" -LaCapra) According to LaCapra, Caruth's main ideas treat real historical events (such as the Holocaust or war) as if they are mostly about how words and stories always fail to describe what happened. LaCapra believed that this approach obfuscates the distinction between the actual past event and the present-day work of scholars, as well as that between the people who lived through trauma and the scholars who study it.

In 2008 Michelle Balaev, a researcher, questioned the degree to which Caruth's portrayal of trauma as fundamentally unrepresentable corresponds with clinical and empirical accounts from psychology, where many survivors describe fragmented yet accessible memories rather than a complete void of representation.

In 2014 Alan Gibbs, Ph.D., critiqued Caruth's approach as favoring a distinctive modernist style in representations of trauma—marked by fragmentation, temporal displacement, and narrative gaps—which may have quietly influenced prevailing expectations for how such experiences are conveyed in literature. According to Gibbs, Caruth's model may distance particular events from their immediate historical and political settings by emphasizing trauma's belated and "unclaimed" quality, framing them primarily as symptoms of an unrepresentable past.

Beyond her academic scholarship, Caruth faced criticism from the Cornell Graduate and Professional Student Assembly (GPSA), Cornell graduate student body, and other activists in 2018 after a private letter defending NYU professor Avital Ronell, who was found guilty of sexually harassing a doctoral student, was leaked to the public. The letter, whose primary goal was to urge NYU to protect Ronell during a Title IX investigation, was signed by Caruth and 50 other scholars. Caruth clarified her position in a letter to the editor published in The Cornell Daily Sun, but critics pointed out that her support of Ronell seemed inconsistent with her published writings regarding power dynamics and trauma, and she did not retract her name from the original letter.

== Annotated bibliography ==
=== Books ===
- Empirical Truths and Critical Fictions: Locke, Wordsworth, Kant, Freud. Baltimore, MD: Johns Hopkins University Press. 1991. ISBN 978-0-8018-9269-1. (Note: Caruth's first monograph grew out of her thesis, which explored philosophical, literary, and psychoanalytic notions of experience by focusing on a death encounter that was unique for not being incorporated into experience at the time it occurred.)
- Caruth, Cathy; Esch, Deborah, eds. (1995). Critical Encounters: Reference and Responsibility in Deconstructive Writing. New Brunswick, N.J.: Rutgers University Press. ISBN 978-0-8135-2186-2. (Note: Written in defense of Deconstruction, the essays in this collection portrayed Deconstruction as a rigorous ethical practice—one which focuses on the moments where language fails to represent an event fully. This putative failure, the collection showed, is constitutive not of a flaw but of a starting point for genuine responsibility toward the past.)
- Trauma: Explorations in Memory. Baltimore, MD: JHUP. 1995. ISBN 978-0801-85007-3. (Note: Originally published as two special issues of American Imago, this volume featured essays and interviews from various contributors, including psychiatrists Bessel van der Kolk and Robert Jay Lifton and filmmaker Claude Lanzmann. Regarded in academic literature as a contributing text to the development of Trauma Studies, it addressed AIDS and sexual violence alongside other historical atrocities such as the Holocaust and child abuse.)
- Unclaimed Experience: Trauma, Narrative and History. Baltimore, MD: JHUP. 1996. ISBN 978-0-801-89619-4. (Note: A French edition was released in September 2023 by Éditions Hermann: Caruth, Cathy (2023). L'Expérience inappropriable. Le trauma, le récit et l'histoire. Translated by Guidoni, Élise. Hermann. ISBN 979-1-037-02271-4.) (Note: Chapter 3 was published in Japanese translation in 1996: Caruth, Cathy (1996). "トラウマからの/への出立--生きのびることと歴史". Gendai Shiso (現代思想) (in Japanese). 24 (12). trans. Michiko Shimokobe. Tokyo: Seidosha: 139–151.) (Note: Chapter 5 was published in Portuguese translation in the 2000 anthology Catástrofe e representação: Caruth, Cathy (2000). "Modalidades do despertar traumático (Freud, Lacan e a ética da memória)". Catástrofe e representação. São Paulo: Escuta: 111–136.)
- Literature in the Ashes of History. Baltimore, MD: JHUP. 2013. ISBN 978-1-421-41155-2. (Note: Caruth's third monograph built on earlier theories on trauma and latency, but applied them to broader political and historiographical themes, such as erasure and human rights. Caruth argued that catastrophic events in the 20th and 21st centuries often undo their own remembrance and leave only information gaps where facts should be, and literature is a medium that is capable of recording this disappearance.)
- Listening to Trauma: Conversations with Leaders in the Theory and Treatment of Catastrophic Experience. Baltimore, MD: JHUP. 2014. ISBN 978-1-421-41446-1. (Note: Consisting of interviews conducted by Caruth with various figures, including psychoanalysts, psychiatrists, sociologists, and activists, this collection constituted an oral history of Trauma Theory, capturing the development of the field over 25 years and navigating the gap between academic theory and practical, clinical, or activist interventions.)

=== Journal Articles and Essays ===
- "Speculative Returns: Bloom's Recent Work". MLN. 98 (5): 1286–1296. December 1983. (Note: In her discussion of two of Harold Bloom’s later works–her debut publication–Caruth argued that Bloom’s transition from a model of family romance to one of transference reveals that poetic creation is fundamentally driven by a catastrophic, traumatic encounter with the past–a process that isn't just a struggle for power between authors but a linguistic repetition where meaning is born from an original loss that can be neither fully understood nor recovered.)
- "Past Recognition: Narrative Origins in Wordsworth and Freud". MLN. 100 (5): 935–948. December 1985. (Note: This article was later revised for the book Empirical Truths and Critical Fictions: Locke, Wordsworth, Kant, Freud.) (Note: According to Caruth, Wordsworth’s poetry shows that human beings' sense of who they are is not merely a natural emotional story but built on a propped-up framework of language and symbols that replaces their real childhood experiences. Caruth argued that people only understand themselves by reading their past like a book, which means their identity is always a bit artificial and based on a connection to their mothers that they have already lost.)
- "'Unknown causes': Poetic Effects". Diacritics. 17 (4): 78–85. 1987. (Note: Using Wordsworth's The Prelude as her primary example, Caruth argued that the beginning of a poem (or any creative act) often starts with a trauma or a loss that the mind can't fully understand or process at the time. Because this origin is a mystery, the poet is forced to keep writing and adding more to the story to try–and ultimately fail–to bridge the gap between what happened and what it actually means.)
- "The Force of Example: Kant's Symbols". Yale French Studies. 74: 17–37. 1988. (Note: In this essay, Caruth argued that Kant’s critical philosophy, which aims to be a rigorous, self-contained system of logic, is actually dependent on language, narrative, and examples in a way that Kant did not intend. Caruth set forth the idea that philosophical criticism is a form of literary criticism, saying that philosophy cannot gain systematic access to the world through language without it turning into a story. Caruth also performed a deconstructive reading of Kant’s use of the symbol of God’s love, claiming that this symbol is built upon a hidden narrative of sacrifice and requires the death of an extra child to function. Moreover, she suggested that what is referred to as "experience" or "the empirical world" is a linguistic figure generated by the argument to fill a gap.) (Note: This article was later revised for the book Empirical Truths and Critical Fictions: Locke, Wordsworth, Kant, Freud.)
- "Unclaimed Experience: Trauma and the Possibility of History". Yale French Studies. 79: 181–192. 1991. (Note: This article was later revised for the book Unclaimed Experience: Trauma, Narrative, and History.) (Note: Japanese translation: Shimokobe, Michiko (1995). "その経験は誰のものか?". Gendai Shiso. 23 (7). Seidosha: 119–131.)
- Lanzmann, Claude; Caruth, Cathy; Rodowick, David (Winter 1991). "The Obscenity of Understanding: An Evening with Claude Lanzmann". American Imago. 48 (4). The Johns Hopkins University: 473–495. JSTOR 26303924.
- "Violence and Time: Traumatic Survivals". Assemblage (journal) (20). The MIT Press: 24–25. April 1993. doi:10.2307/3171242.
- "An Interview with Geoffrey Hartman". Studies in Romanticism. 35 (4): 631–652. 1996. (Note: In this interview, Caruth and Hartman explored the relationship between literary knowledge and traumatic experience, discussing how poetry and language may allow for the processing of shock without succumbing to sensory overload or numbness. The discussion covered Wordsworth and nature, with Hartman discussing "Boy of Winander" episode from The Prelude, as well as his work with the Fortunoff Video Archive for Holocaust Testimonies. Hartman reflected on how the Holocaust and modern technology have altered human beings' sense of place, making the act of retelling stories a vital way to recuperate a sense of the future. The interview framed literature and testimony as ways of not just recording facts but also creatively responding to difficult aspects of human history.) (Note: This article was later republished in the book Listening to Trauma: Conversations with Leaders in the Theory and Treatment of Catastrophic Experience.)
- "An Interview with Jean Laplanche". Postmodern Culture. 11 (2). January 2001. (Note: This interview was translated and reprinted in Spanish in 2015: Caruth, Cathy (March 2015). "Una entrevista con Jean Laplanche". Alter. Revista de psicoanálisis (in Spanish). 9: 1–14.) (Note: In this interview, Caruth and Laplanche explored how human beings develop a psyche through their interactions with others, focusing on a re-evaluation of Freud's seduction theory. Laplanche argued against the idea that the unconscious is something people inherit biologically, criticized Jeffrey Masson for focusing on factuality and accusing Freud of covering up childhood abuse, and suggested that non-sexual events (e.g., a train crash) become psychic traumas as they trigger a release of sexual energy tied to early childhood messages. In addition, Laplanche framed child development as a response to the original, unavoidable seduction of childhood caregivers.) (Note: This article was later republished in the book Listening to Trauma: Conversations with Leaders in the Theory and Treatment of Catastrophic Experience.)
- "Parting words: Trauma, silence and survival". Cultural Values. 5 (1): 7–26. 2001. doi:10.1080/14797580109367218.
- "The Claims of the Dead: History, Haunted Property, and the Law". Critical Inquiry. 28 (2): 419–441. 2002. (Note: This essay marked an expansion of Caruth's theoretical framework into legal philosophy, analyzing the French Charter of 1814 to demonstrate how Article 11 attempted to extinguish the memory of the French Revolution. Caruth contended that such attempts at legal suppression fail, as history instead persists as "haunted property" and continues to exert a claim on the present through figures of the dead, with the law becoming a site where trauma must be witnessed rather than just managed.)
- Guerin, Frances; Hallas, Roger, eds. (2008). "History as false witness: trauma, politics and war". Witness: Memory, Representation, the Media in Question. Museum Tusculanum Press. pp. 150–173. ISBN 978-87-635-0453-9.
- Rambo, Shelly L., ed. (Fall 2008). "Literature and Religion in the Aftermath: Reading (Sacred) Texts in Light of Trauma [Special Issue]". Studies in the Literary Imagination. 41 (2). Afterword by Cathy Caruth.
- "Lying and history" (PDF). Thinking in dark times: Hannah Arendt on ethics and politics. Fordham University Press: 79–92. 2010.
- "Interview with Gayatri Chakravorty Spivak". PMLA. 125 (4). Cambridge University Press: 1020–1025. October 2010. doi:10.1632/pmla.2010.125.4.1020.
- Caruth, Cathy; Culler, Jonathan, eds. (October 2010). "Special Topic: Literary Criticism for the Twenty-First Century [Special Issue]". PMLA. 125 (4). Afterword by Cathy Caruth: 905–1152. (Note: Caruth authored "Afterword: Turning Back to Literature" as the concluding piece for this special issue of PMLA, in which she advocated for a return to philology, arguing that literary studies will endure in higher education because literature constitutes a perpetually relevant site for encountering the voices of the past and witnessing history.)
- Behdad, Ali; Thomas, Dominic, eds. (2011). "Orphaned Language: Traumatic Crossings in Literature and History". A Companion to Comparative Literature. Blackwell Companions to Literature and Culture. Vol. 76. Chichester, England: Wiley-Blackwell. pp. 239–253. doi:10.1002/9781444342789.ch16. ISBN 9781405198790. (Note: Caruth applied concepts from structural anthropology and Plato's Phaedrus (dialogue) to classical literature in this 2011 piece analyzing David Copperfield, where she set forth the idea that literary works are mobile pieces of history that gain full meaning only as they circulate away from their creators. She argued that, in writing David Copperfield, Charles Dickens used the figure of the orphan as a metanarrative device to represent the relationship between an author and his text.)
- "[About Geoffrey Hartman]". Philological Quarterly. 93 (2): 158–161. 2014. (Note: Caruth paid tribute to her doctoral advisor, Professor Geoffrey H. Hartman (1929–2016), by contributing an essay to a special section of Philological Quarterly titled "About Geoffrey Hartman: Materials for a Study of Intellectual Influence," edited by Frances Ferguson and Kevis Goodman. In her essay, Caruth demonstrated how Hartman's early insight into John Milton equipped him to think about the Holocaust in a way that maintained both the factual reality of the event and the possibility of experiencing normal, everyday life without letting either one dominate the other.)
- Caruth, Cathy, ed. (October 2014). "Tragedy, Translation, and Theory: In Honor of Thomas J. McCall". Romantic Circles. Praxis Series. University of Colorado Boulder. (Note: Caruth edited a memorial issue of Romantic Circles dedicated to honoring the legacy of Professor Thomas J. McCall (1953-2011), who was an academic in the fields of Romanticism and translation theory. Caruth contributed an essay, "Tragedy and Translation: Tom McCall’s 'Case of the Missing Body,'” in which she argued that translation is "most called for just where it is least possible.")
  - "Tragedy and Translation: Tom McCall's "Case of the Missing Body"". Romantic Circles. University of Colorado Boulder. October 2014.
- "Language in Flight: Memorial, Narrative and History in David Copperfield". Sillages critiques (22). March 30, 2017. doi:10.4000/sillagescritiques.4880.
- "'A perverse quest for meaning': false witness in Vietnam and beyond". Continuum. 31 (5): 610–618. October 12, 2017. doi:10.1080/10304312.2017.1357333.
- "The Body's Testimony: Dramatic Witness in the Eichmann Trial". Paragraph. 40 (3): 259–278. November 2017.
- Davis, Colin; Meretoja, Hanna, eds. (2020). "Trauma, Time and Address". The Routledge Companion to Literature and Trauma. Routledge. ISBN 978-1-351-02522-5.
- Caruth, Cathy; Brochard, Romain Pasquer; Tam, Ben (2019). ""Who Speaks from the Site Of Trauma?": An Interview with Cathy Caruth". Diacritics. 47 (2). Johns Hopkins University Press: 48–71. doi:10.1353/dia.2019.0014.
- Majoul, Bootheina; Amraoui, Yosra, eds. (October 6, 2020). "Introduction: On History & Memory: Cross-Cultural Modes of Listening". On History and Memory in Arab Literature and Western Poetics. Newcastle upon Tyne: Cambridge Scholars Publishing. pp. 1–10. ISBN 978-1-5275-6042-0. (Note: In her introduction to this 2020 volume, Caruth argued that trauma is a "speaking wound" because it involves experiences so overwhelming they aren't fully understood when they happen. According to Caruth, history is often made of these "missed" moments, suggesting that we can only truly connect across different cultures by learning to listen to each other's silences and unprocessed pain.)
- Ballengee, Jennifer; Kelman, David, eds. (2021). "Globalization and the Theory of Trauma: A Conversation with Cathy Caruth". Trauma and Literature in an Age of Globalization. Routledge. ISBN 978-1-003-05631-7.

== See also ==
- Psychological trauma
- Psychoanalytic theory
- Psychohistory
- Yale school
- Deconstruction
