= Michael O'Neill (academic) =

English poet, and academic

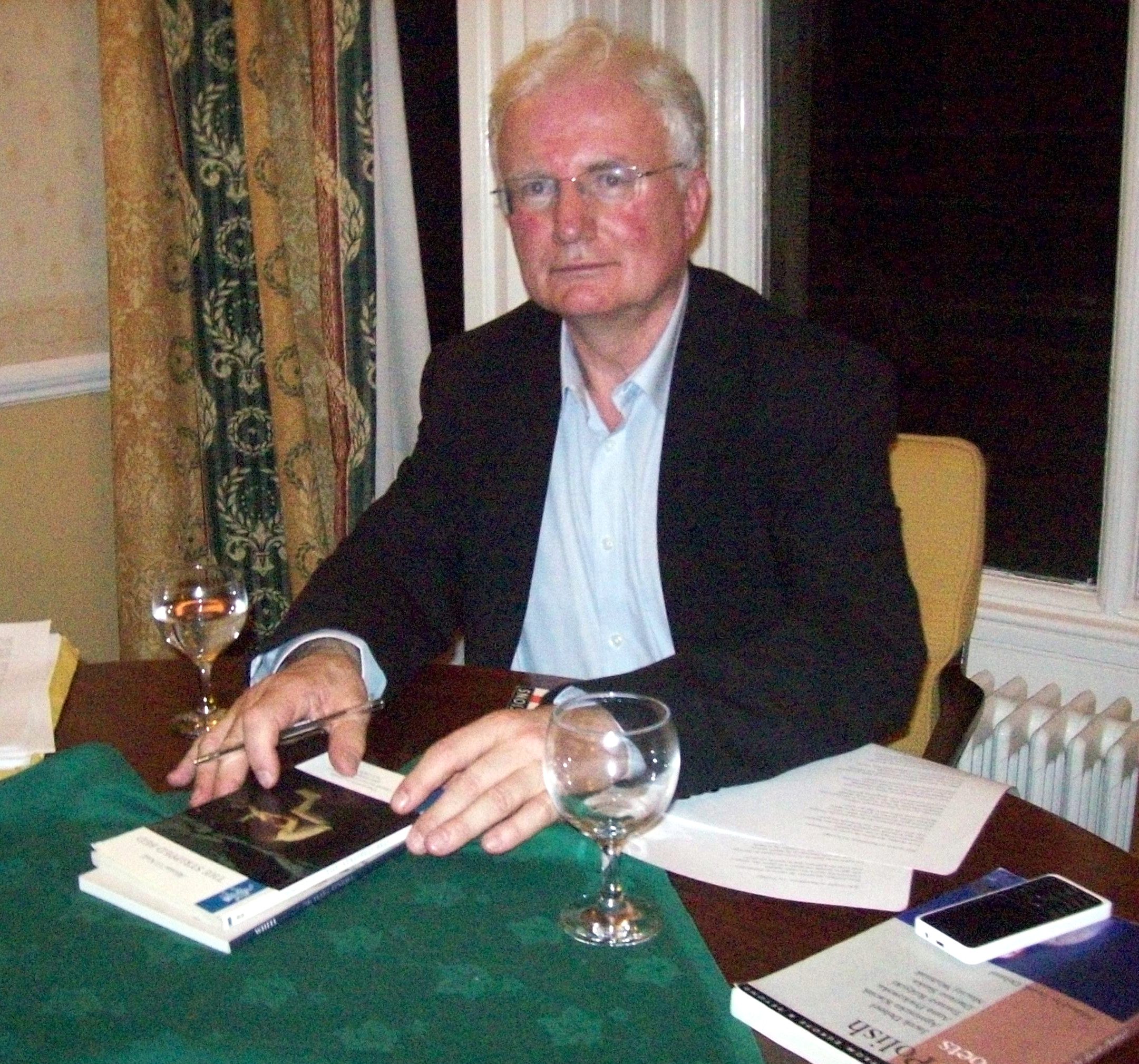
- O'Neill signing a copy of The Stripped Bed in 2007
- Born: 1953; Aldershot, Hampshire, England
- Died: 21 December 2018 (aged 65); Durham, England

Academic background
- Education: Exeter College, Oxford

Academic work
- Discipline: English

Michael O'Neill (1953 – 21 December 2018) was an English poet and scholar, specialising in the Romantic period and post-war poetry. He published four volumes of original poetry; his academic writing was praised as "beautifully and lucidly written".

== Academic career ==
A graduate of Exeter College, Oxford, O'Neill had lectured at Durham University since 1979, holding the title of Professor. He was on the editorial boards of four journals, Romanticism, Romanticism on the Net, the Keats-Shelley Review and The Wordsworth Circle, as well as being a Fellow of the English Association and on the editorial board of the academic website Romantic Circles.

=== Publications ===
His most significant publications were on the topic of Romantic literature, of which his most notable single-authored academic works were his 1997 book Romanticism and the Self-Conscious Poem and his 2007 book The All-Sustaining Air (Oxford University Press), which explores the influence of Romantic poetry on poets from Yeats to Roy Fisher.

One of his particular fields of expertise was the work of Percy Bysshe Shelley, about whom he published several books, chapters and journal articles, as well as writing Shelley's entry in the Dictionary of National Biography. He published a facsimile and transcription of two MS copies of Shelley's The Defence of Poetry (in the series The Bodleian Shelley Manuscripts), praised as "a valuable, and ideally executed, contribution to dedicated Shelley scholarship".

In addition, he edited and co-edited several important works on Romantic and post-Romantic literature and poetry, including Romantic Poetry: An Annotated Anthology (Blackwell, 2007), A Routledge Literary Sourcebook on the Poems of W. B. Yeats (Routledge, 2004), Percy Bysshe Shelley: The Major Works, Including Poetry, Prose and Drama (Oxford University Press, 2003) and Literature of the Romantic Period: A Bibliographical Guide (Clarendon Press, 1998).

He was the general editor of Blackwell's Guide to Criticism series, for which he was composing a volume on modernist poetry. He also co-founded Poetry Durham, which he edited between 1982 and 1994.

== Poetry ==
In addition to his academic career, O'Neill was a poet and was awarded an Eric Gregory Award in 1983 and a Cholmondeley Award from the Society of Authors in 1990. During his lifetime he published four volumes Wheel, Gangs of Shadow and Return of the Gift, all with ARC Publications, as well as an earlier collection The Stripped Bed published in 1990 by Collins Harvill. Return of the Gift received a special commendation from the Poetry Book Society and was launched in an event held at Hatfield College, Durham University in February 2018. His last poetry collection, Crash and Burn, in which he writes about his battle with cancer, was published posthumously in April 2019.

== Awards ==
- 1983 Eric Gregory Award
- 1990 Cholmondeley Award

== Bibliography ==
=== Poetry ===
- The Stripped Bed. London: Collins Harvill. 1990. ISBN 978-0-00-271019-0.
- Wheel. ARC Publications. 2008. ISBN 978-1-904614-79-1.
- Gangs of Shadow. ARC Publications. 2014. ISBN 978-1-906570-64-4.
- Crash and Burn. ARC Publications. 2017.

=== Academic ===
==== Monographs ====
- The Human Mind's Imaginings: Conflict and Achievement in Shelley's Poetry. Oxford: Clarendon Press. 1989. ISBN 978-0-19-811748-3.
- Percy Bysshe Shelley: A Literary Life (Basingstoke: Macmillan, 1989)
- Auden, MacNeice, Spender: The Thirties Poetry, with Gareth Reeves (Basingstoke: MacMillan, 1989)
- Romanticism and the Self-Conscious Poem (Oxford: Clarendon Press, 1997)
- The All-Sustaining Air: Romantic Legacies and Renewals in British, American, and Irish Poetry since 1900 (Oxford: Oxford University Press, 2007)
- Dante Rediscovered: From Blake to Rodin, with S. Hebron and D. Bindman (Grasmere: The Wordsworth Trust, 2007)

==== Anthologies, facsimiles ====
- The Defence of Poetry Fair Copies (The Bodleian Shelley Manuscripts vol. XX; New York: Garland, 1994)
- Fair-Copy Manuscripts of Shelley's Poems in European and American Libraries, with D. H. Reiman (New York: Garland, 1997)
- Zachary Leader; Michael O'Neill, eds. (2003). Percy Bysshe Shelley: The Major Works, Including Poetry, Prose, and Drama. Oxford: Oxford University Press. ISBN 978-0-19-281374-9.
- A Routledge Literary Sourcebook on the Poems of W.B. Yeats (London: Routledge, 2004)
- Michael O'Neill; Charles Mahoney, eds. (2007). Romantic Poetry: An Annotated Anthology. Oxford: Blackwell. ISBN 978-0-631-21316-1.

==== Edited collections ====
- Keats: Bicentenary Readings (Edinburgh: Edinburgh University Press, 1997)
- Literature of the Romantic Period: A Bibliographical Guide (Oxford: Clarendon Press, 1998)
- Michael O'Neill; Mark Sandy, eds. (2006). Romanticism: Critical Concepts in Cultural and Literary Studies. London: Taylor & Francis. ISBN 978-0-415-24725-2.
