= The Devil's Walk =

Poem

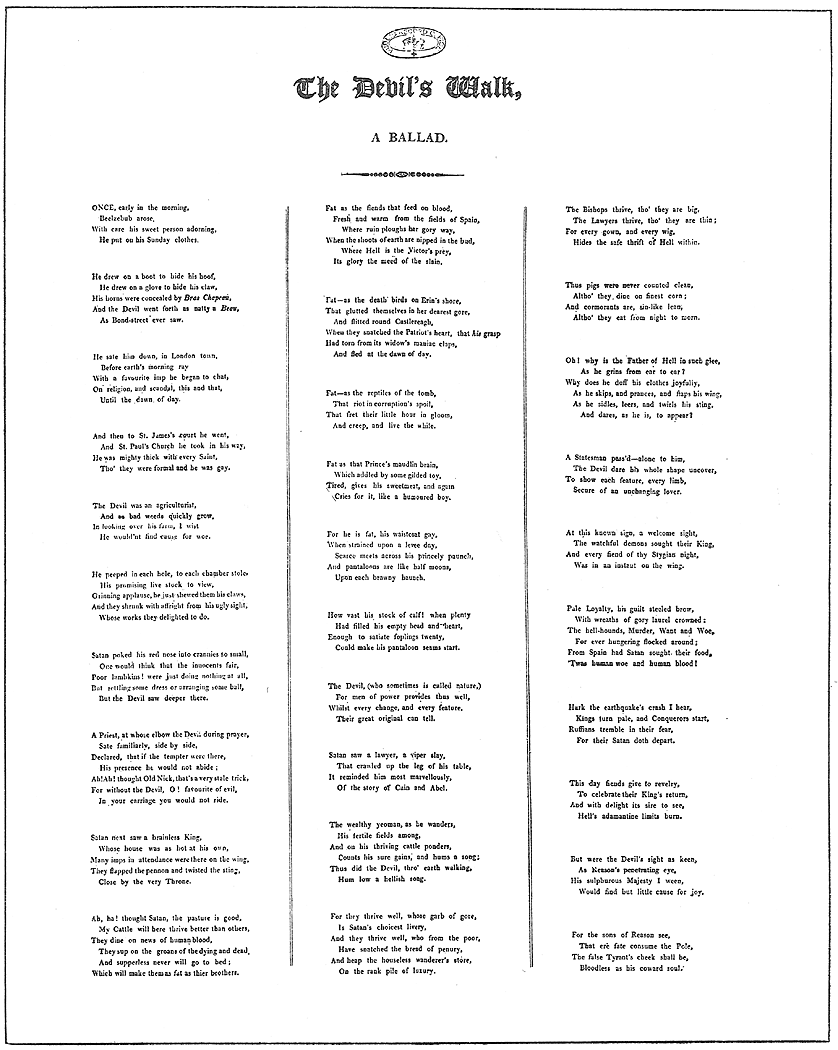
1812 broadside, The Devil's Walk.

"The Devil's Walk: A Ballad" is a political poem published as a broadside by English writer Percy Bysshe Shelley in 1812.

The poem consisted of seven irregular ballad stanzas of 49 lines. The poem was a satirical attack and criticism of the British government. Satan is depicted meeting with key members of the government. The poem was modelled on and meant as a continuation of "The Devil's Thoughts" of 1799 by Samuel Taylor Coleridge and Robert Southey. The work represents an early stage in Shelley's development of works that criticise the government and advocate political and economic reform.

== Background ==
Shelley wrote the poem in 1812 as a protest against the British government's policies and the harsh economic conditions of the time. He had become increasingly radicalised as the war with Napoleon and economic recession resulted in food riots, luddism, and government suppression of political dissent. He attacked "a brainless King" and the "princely paunch" and "each brawny haunch" of the Prince Regent. He also castigated members of both houses of Parliament, the Church, the wealthy and the Peninsular War.

== Plot ==
The devil, Beelzebub, awoke and dressed in his Sunday clothes. He puts on boots to hide his hooves and gloves to hide his claws. He wears a three-cornered hat, a bras chapeau, to hide his horns.

He went to London where he discussed religion and scandals with a friend. He went to St. James’s Court and St. Paul’s Church. He was “an agriculturist” and took care of his farm and his live-stock.

The devil then sat next to a priest at prayestates that without the Devil, the priest would have no job.

He then observed “a brainless King” with his attendants.

He observes that political leaders thrive from war and conflict and human misery. He castigates the Dublin Castle administration and the Peninsular War in Spain. He attacks Lord Castlereagh. He attacks the Prince as being fat and having a “maudlin brain”. He observes that the Devil, sometimes called Nature, supports “men of power” and privilege.

He next observed a lawyer kill a “viper” which climbed up the leg of the table. The Devil hums “a hellish song”, comparing himself to a “yeoman” who surveys his lands contemplating his profits and gains.

He noted how the wealthy plunder and impoverish the poor. He castigates Bishops and Lawyers for their greed and pomp.

He next encounters a statesman to whom he reveals himself. The hell-hounds Murder, Want, and Woe, flocked around them. He castigates the carnage in Spain.

The devil is joyful. Monarchs prosper in war and turmoil and depredation.

Reason, however, will ultimately prevail. Those with reason, “the sons of Reason”, understand that as reason prevails, the rule of tyrants will be short-lived and they will eventually be overthrown

== Critical reception ==
Shelley biographer Richard Holmes assessed the poem as: "unevenly handled and lacking sufficient striking power, but some of the images have a lively presence." He adds that the poem represents an early stage in Shelly's development towards more sophisticated political poems such as "The Mask of Anarchy".

Michael O'Neill described the poem as: "a rowdy babel of styles and attitudes. Anti-establishment jeers, personalised gibes, lofty moralising, heartfelt indignation, and millennial prophecy rub shoulders in a poem whose diction veers energetically between the demotic and the literary, the physical and the abstract."

Chris Foss assessed it as "first and foremost an entertaining read, but this lively ballad also serves as a prism through which one discovers many instructive intertextual links.". He argued that the poem served as a model for later works such as The Masque of Anarchy: "A number of these links cluster around its resurfacing as a subtle yet significant source of influence upon Shelley's thought and work during his later, more celebrated period of political poetry in 1819-20."

== Sources ==
- Forman, Harry Buxton. The Poetical Works of Percy Bysshe Shelley. London: Reeves and Turner, 1877.
- Chewning, Harris. "William Michael Rossetti and the Shelley Renaissance." Keats-Shelley Journal, Vol. 4, (Winter 1955).
- McCarthy, Denis Florence. Shelly's Early Life From Original Sources. London: Hotten, 1872.
- Jones, Frederick L., ed. The Letters Of Percy Bysshe Shelley. Oxford: Clarendon Press, 1964.
- Duff, David. Romance And Revolution: Shelley And The Politics Of A Genre. Cambridge: Cambridge University Press, 1994.
- Cameron, Kenneth. The Young Shelley: Genesis Of A Radical. New York: Macmillan, 1950.
- Keach, William. "Early Shelley: Vulgarisms, Politics, and Fractals: Young Shelley." Romantic Circles.
- Curran, Stuart. University of Pennsylvania, "On Devils, and the Devil; or Vice's Versus". Romantic Circles. Electronic resource, University of Maryland.
- Craciun, Asriana. Loyola University Chicago, "Heavenly Medicine in Hellish Songs: Diabolical Hypertext". Romantic Circles Electronic Resource.
- Fraistat, Neil. "The 'Devil' to Edit: Time, Space and Hypertextuality", University of Maryland. Romantic Circles.
- Griffin, Robert. Tel Aviv University, "The Mode of Existence of Shelley's 'The Devil's Walk'". Romantic Circles.
- Hoagwood, Terence. Texas A&M University, "Meaning and the Mode of Existence of 'Works': A Response to Robert J. Griffin, "The Mode of Existence of Shelley's 'The Devil's Walk'". Romantic Circles.
- O'Neill, Michael. University of Durham, UK, "'A Hellish Song': Shelley's 'The Devil's Walk'". Romantic Circles.
- Stauffer, Andrew. University of Virginia, Response. Romantic Circles.
- Paley, Morton. University of California, Berkeley, "'The Devil's Walk' and 'The Devil's Thoughts'". Romantic Circles.
- Graver, Bruce. Providence College, Response. Romantic Circles.
- Reiman, Don. University of Delaware, "Shelley and Popular Culture: 'The Devil's Walk'"
- Scrivener, Michael. Wayne State University, Response. Romantic Circles.
- Foss, Chris. Texas Christian University, "Satiric Verses: On Shelley's 'The Devil's Walk' and 'The Mask of Anarchy'". Romantic Circles.
- Jones, Steven E. Shelley's Satire: Violence, Exhortation, and Authority. DeKalb: Northern Illinois University Press, 1994.
