= Rapture (aesthetics) =

Concept in aesthetics

Rapture or aesthetic rapture is a supreme experience or state affected by art in conjunction with imagination. It is an aesthetic concept within the discourse on the function of art. One description states that it is an outcome of the human experience of the beautiful so that it assumes a metaphysical value, which then becomes a means to approach existence.

== Thomistic conceptualization ==
For Thomas Aquinas, rapture in the aesthetic of beauty had a religious conceptualization. It formed part of his theological reflections on the philosophy of art. Aquinas placed rapture within the realm of the intellectual and, for him, is independent of sensory input based on the notion that sensory powers hinder the vision of God. He then described it as an intense intellectual activity that also entails a withdrawal from bodily and sensory activities. It also does not take place in the memory since, according to Aquinas, it is not self-induced, is involuntary, and transpires due to a special divine dispensation. In the Thomistic tradition, rapture allows the human mind to focus on intelligible realities due to a recognition that there is something divine within man rather than due to some human disposition. Aquinas noted that this view was established early on by Aristotle in The Eudemian Ethics VII.14.1248a.

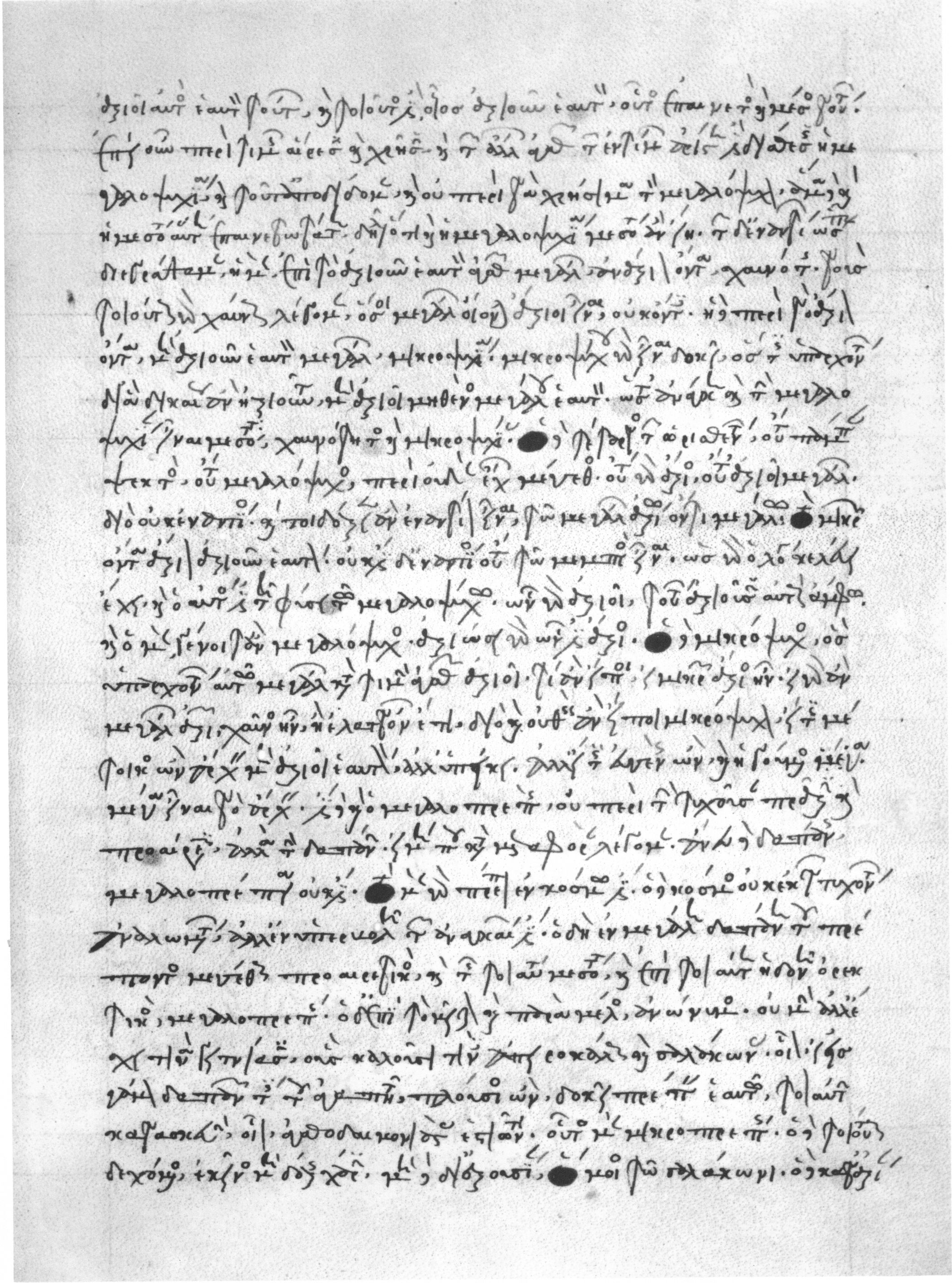
In the Eudemian Ethics (pictured), Aristotle maintained that the contemplation of beauty is unconnected with the activities of the flesh.

Thinkers, like James Joyce, drew from the Thomistic vision and explained how the concept figured in what is called as "proper art", an embodiment of sublime beauty. In Joyce's aesthetic theory, this conceptualization of art, that which gives pleasure once apprehended, acts as a transmitter of an aesthetic idea or inner necessity, hence, the experience is considered spiritual and transcendent. Joyce's theory, which also drew upon Aristotle's Poetics, maintained that true artists have the obligation to create proper art, distinguishing it from the so-called improper art, which described as the cause of desire in the viewer for a tangible object. The latter, according to Joyce, is static and has the capacity to induce “esthetic arrest”, which signified an impassive rapture or capture of the viewer's attention. In this view, Joyce adhered to the Thomasian vision of art as the embodiment of sublime beauty.

Rapture is also a concept of Hans Urs von Balthasar's theology. In his view there are two elements in the beautiful that traditionally controlled every aesthetics: Aquinas' species (forma) and lumen (splendor). Form, which he also referred to as Gestalt refers to the revelation of the mystery of Being and that it allows Being to be materially grasped. According to von Balthazar, "only that which has form can snatch one up into a state of rapture". Balthasar's concept called “double movement”, which addressed the phenomenal appearance in the medium of flesh, involves vision and rapture. It focuses on the attractiveness of the form and the erotic response of the subject. He deviated from Aquinas when he criticized the idea that the body is only the “forestage” of the spirit.

== Kantian aesthetics ==
According to Immanuel Kant, every experience of beauty is rapturous. This broad conceptualization was tempered by his claim that aesthetic rapture is a peculiar kind of subjective phenomenon due to its presentation of itself as anything but subjective. In the Critique of Judgment (1790), he maintained that “a judgment on the beautiful, which is tinged with the slightest interest, is very partial and not a pure judgement of taste.” Particularly, aesthetic rapture was associated with the concept of the sublime, which Kant described as a feeling aroused by the inability of the human mind to comprehend the absolutely great, whether in terms of measure or in might. He wrote that there are two basic categories of the sublime: the “mathematically” and the “dynamically” sublime. The latter was described as the aesthetic rapture brought about by a display of huge power or force affected by nature or works of art. According to Heidegger, Nietzsche's nihilistic misinterpretation of the Kantian theory of aesthetics is misplaced because it also supports the Dionysian understanding of beauty as rapture or ecstasy that completely affirms existence.

== Friedrich Nietzsche ==
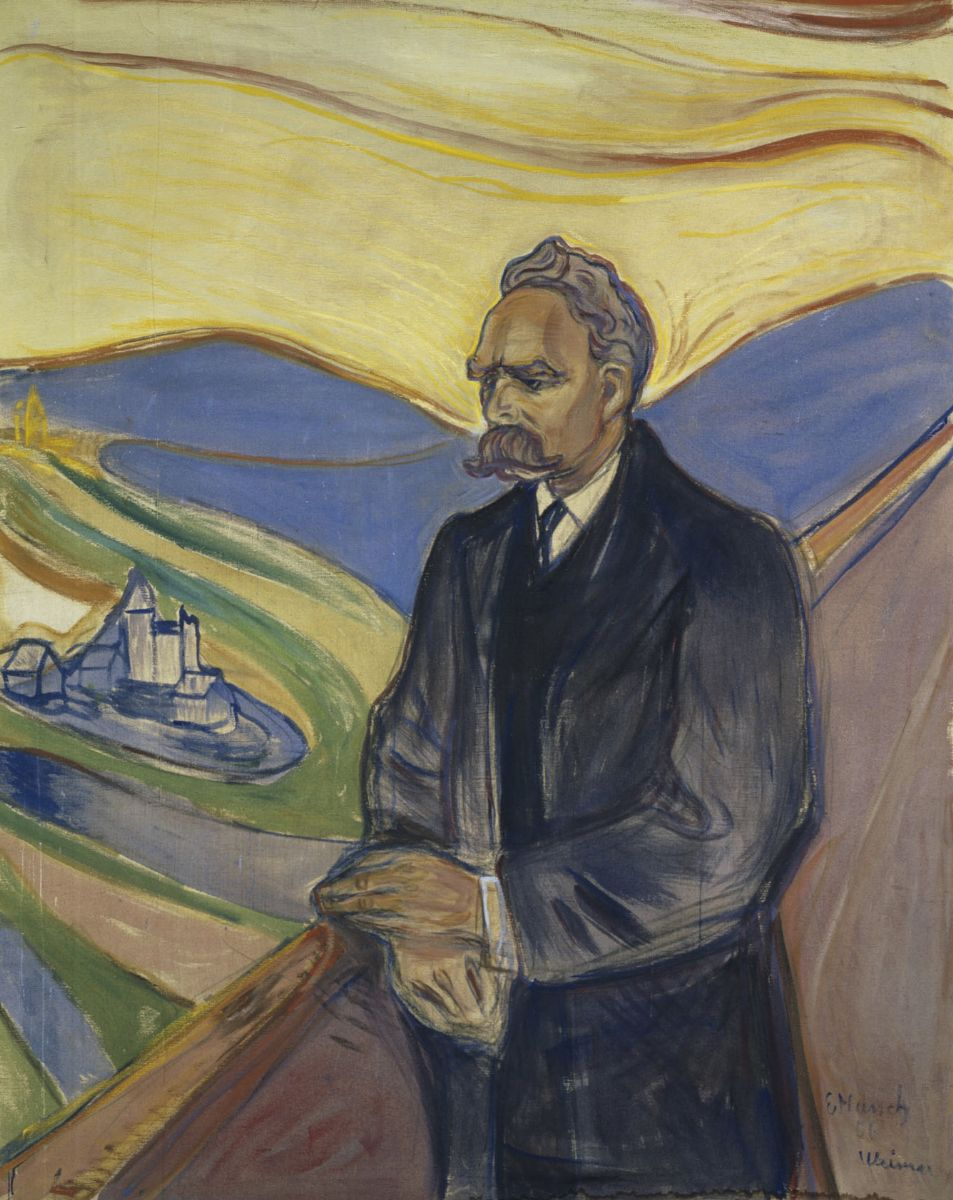
An artistic depiction of Friedrich Nietzsche.

Friedrich Nietzsche underscored the importance of rapture (der Rausch) in his conceptualization of art, where it is considered as the basic configuration of will to power and the greatest stimulans of life. Nietzsche's description of aesthetic rapture has been linked to the concept of a Dionysian experience and involves the totality and unity of corporeal-physical. For Nietzsche, rapture represents the living nature of man and is the highest form of pleasure - that pleasure of life asserting itself and surviving. In this view, rapture links the will to human experience and psychic reality. For this reason, Nietzsche identified rapture as the basic aesthetic feeling. He maintained that "what is essential in rapture is the feeling of enhancement of force and plenitude." It is said that feeling in this view, the “beautiful” is a reflection of what is disclosed in rapture and is what transports us into feeling.

As the basic aesthetic feeling, rapture for Nietzsche is all about being object for physiology. It is not about the goings on of our inner lives but “a mode of embodying, attuned stance towards beings as a whole”. Here beauty and rapture are reciprocally related where rapture is the basic mood while beauty does the attuning. According to Heidegger, this underpinned Nietzsche's notion of the aesthetic opposition between the Apollonian and the Dionysian views.

== Altieri's aesthetic of effects ==
Rapture was used by Charles Altieri to define his affect theory. In this aesthetics of effects, the concept is linked to the term affectus, which is an aspect of experience and love that is so overwhelming it cannot be contained within the bounds of mundane speech. For Altieri, the concept of affective experience occurs independently from the demands of transcendental belief systems as well as man's unconscious desires and fantasies. He maintained that affective experience is realized through dynamic and immediate cultivation of affective stances. Rapture is conceptualized within Altieri's belief that philosophy has distorted our emotional lives and aesthetics commitments. This is in opposition to Plato’s critique of poetic escapism, citing the affective aspect of experience where emotions modify consciousness and also provide man with satisfaction.

== Indian tradition ==
The concept of rapture (rasa) is also present in Indian aesthetic tradition. There are ancient Indian treatises that were devoted to the subject. One of these was the ghazal theorization, which described rapture as a manifestation in the form of an intense aesthetic delight caused by semantic play, language games, and mellifluous renderings of ravani. It is also said that rapture is a way of experiencing Krishna and, hence, described as the "fantastic rasa". The experience is described as a unity of different stable emotions and aesthetic elements. It is analogous to the combination of different ingredients (e.g. pepper, salt, sugar to create a mixed drink) so that they form an entirely different unity independent of their individual characteristics.
