= The Devil's Thoughts =

1799 poem

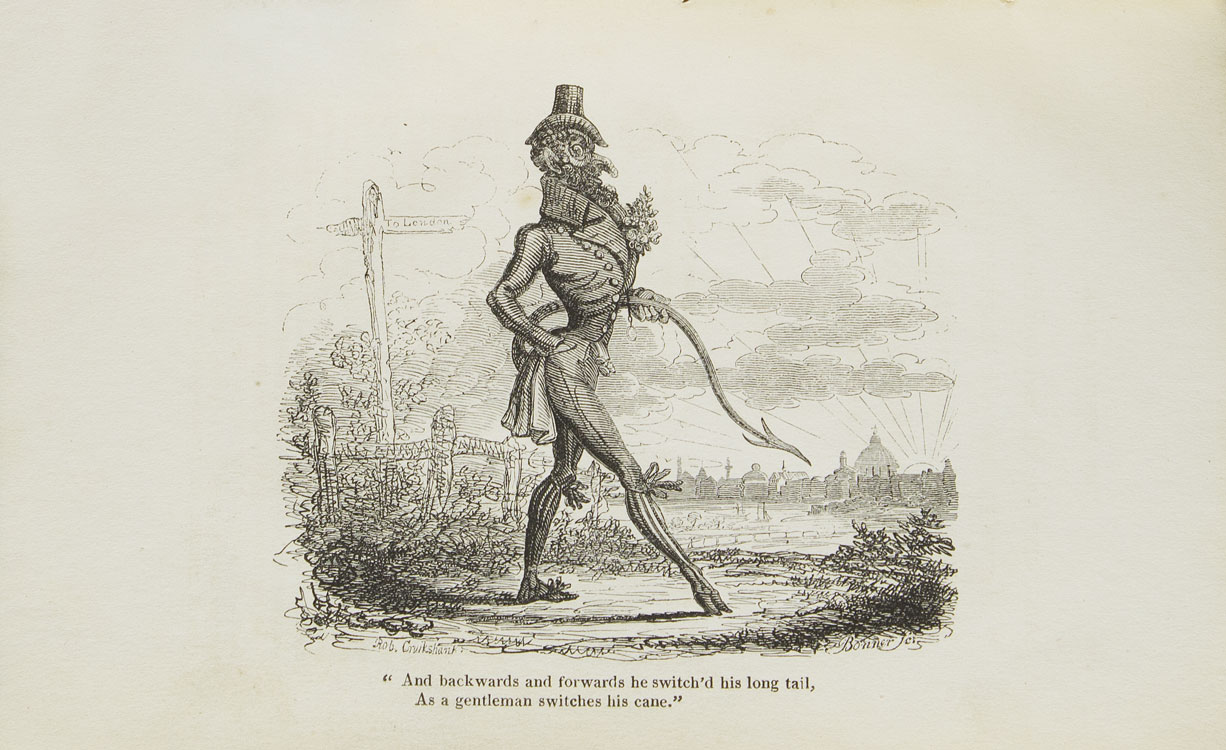
"And backwards and forwards he switch'd his long tail, As a gentleman switches his cane." —Illustration from the 1830 edition of The Devil's Walk, attributed to Professor Porson

"The Devil's Thoughts" is a satirical poem in common metre by Samuel Taylor Coleridge, published in 1799, and expanded by Robert Southey in 1827 and retitled "The Devil's Walk". The narrative describes the Devil going walking and enjoying the sight of the various sins of mankind. The poem was imitated by Lord Byron in "The Devil's Drive", and by Percy Bysshe Shelley in "The Devil's Walk".

== Textual history ==
The poem was first published in the Morning Post, on 6 September 1799. It was included in the 1828, 1829, and 1834 editions of Coleridge's poetry. It was printed separately as The Devil's Walk, a Poem, By Professor Porson, London, Marsh and Miller, &c., in 1830. In 1827, by way of repudiating Richard Porson's alleged authorship of The Devil's Thoughts, Southey expanded the Devil's Thoughts of 1799 into a poem of fifty-seven stanzas entitled The Devil's Walk. This version was printed in Southey's Poetical Works, 1838, Vol. 3. pp. 87–100.

In the Morning Post the poem numbered fourteen stanzas; in 1828 and 1829 it was reduced to ten, and in 1834 enlarged to seventeen stanzas. Stanzas 3 and 14–16 of the text are not in the Morning Post. Stanzas 4 and 5 appeared as 3 and 4; stanza 6 as 9; stanza 7 as 5; stanza 8 as 10; stanza 9 as 8; stanza 10 as 6; stanza 11 as 7; stanza 17 as 14. In 1828 and 1829, the poem consisted of stanzas 1–9 of the established text, and of the concluding stanzas stanza 11 ('Old Nicholas', &c.) of the Morning Post version was not reprinted. Stanzas 14–16 of the text were first acknowledged by Coleridge in 1834.

== Bibliography ==
- Birch, Dinah, ed. (2009). "Devil's Thoughts, The". In The Oxford Companion to English Literature. 7th ed. Oxford Reference. Oxford University Press. Retrieved 10 May 2022.
- Coleridge, E. H. (1912). The Complete Poetical Works of Samuel Taylor Coleridge. Vol. 1. Oxford: Clarendon Press.
- "The Devil's Thoughts (1829 v. 1835)". Romantic Circles. University of Colorado Boulder. Retrieved 10 May 2022.
