= Journal of Scottish Philosophy =

- Discipline: Philosophy
- Language: English

Publication details
- History: 2003–present
- Publisher: Edinburgh University Press (United Kingdom)
- Frequency: Biannual

Standard abbreviations
- ISO 4: J. Scott. Philos.

Indexing
- ISSN: 1479-6651 (print); 1755-2001 (web)
- OCLC no.: 60628593

Links
- Journal homepage; International Association for Scottish Philosophy

The Journal of Scottish Philosophy is an academic journal of philosophy. The journal focuses particularly on the writings of the Scottish Enlightenment philosopher Thomas Reid (1710–96), and on the influence of Scottish philosophy on the foundations of theology and education in North America.

The journal publishes issues on special themes, as well as general issues, and includes reviews of relevant publications alongside scholarly articles. It is published twice yearly by Edinburgh University Press, in March and September, on behalf of the Center for the Study of Scottish Philosophy at Princeton Theological Seminary in the United States.

The journal was founded in 2003 under the auspices of "The Reid Project" at the University of Aberdeen in Scotland. In 2003 The Reid Project was expanded into an established Center for the Study of Scottish Philosophy (CSSP).

== Editor ==
The editor in chief is Gordon Graham (Princeton Theological Seminary).
