= Ruth Leys =

American psychoanalyst

Ruth Leys (born August 31, 1939) is a Scottish-born historian of science. She is noted for her works on trauma, guilt and shame, Holocaust memory, and affect theory. She was the Henry Wiesenfeld Professor Emerita of Humanities and Academy Professor at Johns Hopkins University.

== Education and career ==
Leys earned her B.A. degree in the field of Physiology, Psychology and Philosophy at Oxford University, and her Ph.D. in the History of Science at Harvard University. In 1975, she moved to Johns Hopkins University in Baltimore, Maryland where she held various positions, culminating in her appointment as Professor in the Humanities Center. In 2006 she was appointed to the Henry M. and Elizabeth P. Wiesenfeld Chair of the Humanities. She retired in 2015 and lives in Baltimore with her husband, the art historian, art critic, and poet, Michael Fried.

== Historical work ==
Leys’ work focuses on the history of the human sciences, from the late 19th-century to the present, with a special focus on the history of 20th and 21st-century psychiatry, psychology, psychoanalysis, and the cognitive sciences. Early in her career she undertook the organisation of the very large archive of the correspondence and the personal and institutional papers of the Swiss-American psychiatrist Adolf Meyer. This work led Leys to focus her attention not only on the history of certain European scientific discoveries, such as the reflex concept, the topic of her dissertation, but on American developments as well.

Leys has described her approach as a historian as “genealogical,” in the sense given that term by the French philosopher Michel Foucault. This means that she does not try to present crucial episodes in the history of the topics she is examining in a linear manner, or as part of continuously unfolding historical developments. Rather, she aims to show that those episodes have had both an eruptive character, as if the problems involved were occurring for the first time, and also a recurrent character, because each episode repeats the same difficulties and contradictions that had troubled conceptualisations from the start.

Thus, in her book Trauma: A Genealogy (2000), Leys traces the development of the theorisation of the concept of trauma from its origins in late 19th-century theories of hysteria through its various reformulations as shell shock, war neurosis, and post-traumatic stress disorder (PTSD). She emphasises that throughout its long history the conceptualisation of trauma has experienced the recurrence of certain persistent, unresolved conceptual and empirical difficulties. These difficulties have concerned the role attributed to ‘imitation’ or identification in the trauma victim’s experience of shock. In particular, she analyses the continuous tension or oscillation in the theorisation of trauma between two competing accounts. Leys argues that, on the one hand, victims of trauma have been conceptualised as so swept up in the scene of violence that they blindly and unconsciously imitate or identify with the aggressor, to the point that they are later unable describe or bear witness to what they have seen and experienced. On the other hand, victims of trauma have also been conceptualized differently, as suffering in a mode that allows them to remain spectators who can see and represent to themselves and others what was happening and hence can testify to their experience. The result of the second approach is to deny the idea that victims of trauma are complicitous with the traumatic violence, and to establish instead a strict dichotomy between the victim and the aggressor. Leys also suggests that the concept of trauma has been structured historically in such a way as to invite resolution in favor of one or the other of these competing accounts but to ultimately defeat each attempt at resolution. The figures whose work she critically examines in this framework include Sigmund Freud, Sándor Ferenczi, and Abram Kardiner among the early trauma theorists, but also the more recent theorists and trauma specialists such as Bessel van der Kolk and Cathy Caruth.

Leys has subsequently published books on related topics such as the history of approaches to notions of survivor guilt and shame in the context of World Wars I and II and the Holocaust; the history of approaches to the emotions since WW II; the history of the concept of newborn imitation; and the history of claims concerning the unconscious influence of words or other stimuli (primes) in activating automatic actions. In each case, she tends to identify certain stubborn conceptual conundrums within approaches to these topics, conundrums that constantly threaten to undermine the coherence of dominant approaches. She has described her approach as not only genealogical but as histories of the present. She attaches special significance to the issue of intentionality in the human sciences and the difficulty cognitive science faces when it tries to operationalise intention and meaning.

Another aspect of Leys’ work is her interest in the fact that certain iconic experiments in the human sciences have turned out to be not only poorly designed but have failed to replicate. She argues that we are living in a time of crisis in the psychological sciences owing to inability of researchers to reproduce many of the most influential experiments in the field. Leys frequently homes in on such moments of crisis in order to examine the cracks in the theoretical and research paradigms that can be seen to have haunted those fields all along. Thus in her work on approaches to emotion, she pays close attention to a famous experiment on American and Japanese responses to stressful films that turned out to be misleadingly reported; similarly, her account of the genealogy of the claim that human infants are born with an inbuilt capacity to imitate certain facial movements of adults takes as its starting point iconic experiments on the topic that have been shown to be unreplicable; and her book on the history of priming research likewise takes as its starting-point a failed replication of a famous experiment ostensibly demonstrating the unconscious influence of words connoting old age on the speed with which the experimental subjects walked on leaving the laboratory.

== Selected publications ==
- Leys, Ruth. (1991). "Types of One: Adolf Meyer's Life Chart and the Representation of Individuality." In 'Representations' No. 34 (Spring 1991), 1-28. https://doi.org/10.2307/2928768.
- Leys, Ruth. (2000). Trauma: A Genealogy. Chicago: University of Chicago Press.
- Leys, Ruth. (2007). From Guilt to Shame: Auschwitz and After. Princeton: Princeton University Press.
- Leys, Ruth, and Marlene Goldman. (2010). "Navigating the Genealogies of Trauma, Guilt, and Affect: An Interview with Ruth Leys." In 'University of Toronto Quarterly', Volume 79, Number 2, Spring 2010, pp. 656-679. https://doi.org/10.3138/utq.79.2.656
- Leys, Ruth. (2011). "The Turn to Affect: A Critique." In 'Critical Inquiry', Vol. 37, No. 3 (Spring 2011), pp. 434-472. https://doi.org/10.1086/659353
- Leys, Ruth. (2012). “'Both of Us Disgusted in My Insula': Mirror Neuron Theory and Emotional Empathy." https://nonsite.org/both-of-us-disgusted-in-my-insula-mirror-neuron-theory-and-emotional-empathy/
- Leys, Ruth. (2017). The Ascent of Affect: Genealogy and Critique. Chicago: University of Chicago Press.
- Leys, Ruth. (2020). Newborn Imitation: The Stakes of an Idea. Cambridge, UK: Cambridge University Press.
- Leys, Ruth. (2024). Anatomy of a Train Wreck: The Rise and Fall of Priming Research. Chicago: University of Chicago Press.
