= Translation and Literature =

- Discipline: Literature
- Language: English

Publication details
- History: 1992–present
- Publisher: Edinburgh University Press
- Frequency: Triannual

Standard abbreviations
- ISO 4: Transl. Lit.

Indexing
- ISSN: 0968-1361 (print); 1750-0214 (web)
- JSTOR: 09681361
- OCLC no.: 51782651

Links
- Journal homepage

Translation and Literature is an academic journal of English literature in its foreign relations. The journal was established in 1992 with Stuart Gillespie (University of Glasgow) as editor-in-chief.

== Overview ==
Articles and notes have included: Surrey and Marot, Livy and Jacobean drama, Virgil in Paradise Lost, Pope's Horace, Fielding on translation, Browning's Agamemnon, and Brecht in English.

The journal's remit includes responses to other literatures in the work of English writers, including reception of classical texts; historical and contemporary translation of works in modern languages; history and theory of literary translation, adaptation, and imitation.
