= Edinburgh University Press =

British publisher of academic books and journals

Coordinates: 55°56′37″N 3°11′26″W

- Parent company: University of Edinburgh
- Country of origin: United Kingdom
- Headquarters location: Edinburgh, Scotland, UK
- Distribution: Macmillan Distribution (UK, Europe, and Middle East); Ingram (The Americas); New South Books (Australia and New Zealand); Taylor and Francis (Asia)
- Publication types: Books, academic journals
- Revenue: £4.05 million
- Official website: euppublishing.com

Edinburgh University Press (EUP) is a scholarly publisher of academic books and journals, based in Edinburgh, Scotland.

== History ==
Edinburgh University Press was founded in the 1940s and became a wholly owned subsidiary of the University of Edinburgh in 1992. Books and journals published by the press carry the imprimatur of the University of Edinburgh. All proposed publishing projects are appraised and approved by the Press Committee, which consists of academics from the university. Since August 2004, the Press has had Charitable Status.

In November 2013, Edinburgh University Press acquired Dundee University Press for an undisclosed sum, with a stated aim to increase textbook and digital sales, with a particular focus on law. Brodies advised Edinburgh University Press on the terms of the acquisition.

== Publishing ==
Edinburgh University Press publishes a range of research publications, which include scholarly monographs and reference works, as well as materials which are available on-line. The press also publishes textbooks for students and lecturers. The press publishes around 205 books and 42 journals each year.

Edinburgh University Press publishes mostly in humanities and social sciences.

=== Ebooks ===
The press participates in the ebook platforms University Press Scholarship Online (as Edinburgh Scholarship Online), Books at JSTOR and University Publishing Online, and also works with a number of ebook aggregators. In collaboration with TannerRitchie Publishing and Birlinn Ltd, it publishes the Scotland's History Online, a major collection of new and backlist academic Scottish historical research.

=== Open access ===
EUP supports both gold and green open access publishing, and is one of 13 publishers to participate in the Knowledge Unlatched pilot, a global library consortium approach to funding open access books.

== List of journals ==
- African Journal of International and Comparative Law
- Architectural Heritage
- Archives of Natural History
- Ben Jonson Journal
- Comparative Critical Studies
- Corpora
- Dance Research
- Derrida Today
- Edinburgh Law Review
- Film-Philosophy
- Innes Review
- International Journal of Humanities and Arts Computing
- Journal of Arabic and Islamic Studies
- Journal of Beckett Studies
- Journal of British Cinema and Television
- Journal of Holy Land and Palestine Studies
- Journal of Late Antique, Islamic and Byzantine Studies
- Journal of Qur'anic Studies
- Journal of Scottish Historical Studies
- Journal of Scottish Philosophy
- Oxford Literary Review
- Paragraph
- Psychoanalysis and History
- Romanticism
- Scottish Archaeological Journal
- The Scottish Historical Review
- Studies in World Christianity
- Translation and Literature
- Word Structure

== Business ==
The trustees normally meet five times a year, and are responsible for the conduct of the Edinburgh University Press.

Edinburgh University Press achieved combined book and journal revenues of over £4,000,000 for the year ending 31 July 2021, a 9% increase on the previous year, earning a profit of £316,000.
