= Corpora (journal) =

- Discipline: Linguistics
- Language: English
- Edited by: Tony McEnery

Publication details
- History: 2006–present
- Publisher: Edinburgh University Press (United Kingdom)
- Frequency: Triannual

Standard abbreviations
- ISO 4: Corpora

Indexing
- ISSN: 1749-5032 (print); 1755-1676 (web)
- OCLC no.: 77532191

Links
- Journal homepage

Corpora is a three times yearly peer-reviewed linguistic academic journal that publishes scholarly articles and book reviews on corpus linguistics, with a focus on corpus construction and corpus technology. It is edited by Tony McEnery (Lancaster University).

== Aims and scope ==
The journal is concerned both with the construction of text corpora and their practical use across fields, disciplines and languages. Most emphasis is given to contributions devoted to corpus linguistic theories and methodologies.

== Abstracting and indexing ==
The journal is indexed in the following services:

- Australian Research Council ERA 2010 Ranked Journal List
- Bibliography of Linguistic Literature
- Directory of Lexicography Institutions
- EBSCO A-to-Z
- EBSCO Discovery Service
- EBSCO TOC Premier
- European Reference Index of Research Journals in the Humanities
- JournalTOCs
- Linguistics Abstracts
- Linguistics & Language Behavior Abstracts
- MLA International Bibliography
