= Studies in Romanticism =

American journal on English literature

- Discipline: Literature and Literary Theory
- Language: English
- Edited by: Adriana Craciun

Publication details
- History: 1961–present
- Frequency: Quarterly

Standard abbreviations
- ISO 4: Stud. Romant.

Indexing
- ISSN: 0039-3762 (print); 2330-118X (web)
- OCLC no.: 50573849

Links
- Journal homepage

Studies in Romanticism is a journal of English Literature and Romanticism launched in 1961. It is a quarterly journal, published by Johns Hopkins University Press for Boston University. The founder was David Bonnell Green.
