= Carruth =

Carruth is a surname of Scottish origin. Notable people with the surname include:

- Arthur J. Carruth Jr. (1887–1962), American newspaperman
- Hayden Carruth (1921–2008), American poet and literary critic
- Jimmy Carruth (b. 1969), American basketball player
- Michael Carruth (b. 1967), Irish boxer
- Nathan Carruth (1808–1881), American railroad pioneer
- Rae Carruth (b. 1974), American football player
- Shane Carruth (b. 1972), American film actor and producer
- William Herbert Carruth (1859–1924), American author and poet
