= Paragraph (journal) =

- Discipline: Literary studies
- Language: English

Publication details
- History: 1983–present
- Publisher: Edinburgh University Press (United Kingdom)
- Frequency: Triannually

Standard abbreviations
- ISO 4: Paragraph

Indexing
- ISSN: 0264-8334 (print); 1750-0176 (web)
- OCLC no.: 51101068

Links
- Journal homepage; Online archive

Paragraph is a peer-reviewed academic journal that publishes essays and review articles which explore critical theory and its application to literature, other arts, and society. It is published three times a year, in March, July and November, by Edinburgh University Press.

The journal was established in 1983 as the publication of the Modern Critical Theory Group, which was founded to provide a forum to discuss the intellectual movements which came out of Paris in the 1960s and 1970s. In 1986 Oxford University Press took over publication of the journal and since 1991 it has been published by Edinburgh University Press.
