= Romanticism (journal) =

- Discipline: Romantic studies
- Language: English
- Edited by: Nicholas Roe

Publication details
- History: 1995–present
- Publisher: Edinburgh University Press (UK)
- Frequency: Triannual
- Open access: No

Standard abbreviations
- ISO 4: Romanticism

Indexing
- ISSN: 1354-991X (print); 1750-0192 (web)

Links
- Journal homepage; Project MUSE

Romanticism is a triannual peer-reviewed academic journal dedicated to Romantic studies, focusing on the period 1750–1850. It was established in 1995 and is published by Edinburgh University Press.
