= Mood management theory =

Mood management theory posits that the consumption of messages, particularly entertaining messages, is capable of altering prevailing mood states, and that the selection of specific messages for consumption often serves the regulation of mood states (Zillmann, 1988a). Mood management theory now belongs to a larger group of theoretical approaches which speak on media content and how it plays a role in mood management. Mood optimization is a current affective state of media mood management.

== History ==
The idea of selecting media content in the interest of enhancing one's states has been proposed by Zillmann and Bryant (1985) and Zillmann (1988a). Initially, the assumptions were referred to as theory of affect-dependent stimulus arrangement, but subsequently gained more prominence under the label of mood management (Knobloch, 2006).

Mood management research may be traced back to Leon Festinger's (1957) cognitive dissonance theory. Festinger notes that the human organism tries to establish internal congruity among cognitions such as attitudes, beliefs, and knowledge about oneself and the environment. When a person holds two cognitions that are incompatible, dissonance is produced. But such dissonance can be reduced through selective exposure, that is, individuals will seek out information that will reduce the dissonance and avoid information that will increase the already existing dissonance.

Festinger's theory was primarily laid out in cognitive terms, addressing exposure choices to persuasive messages. Zillmann and his colleagues thus proposed the mood management theory that attempts to cope with the broadest possible range of message choices such as news, documents, comedies, dramas, tragedies, music performances, and sports. It deals with all conceivable moods rather than a single, specific affective state, such as dissonance (Zillman, 1988b).

== Fundamental assumptions ==
Based on the hedonistic premise that individuals are motivated for pleasure and against pain, mood management theory states that, to the extent possible, individuals tend to arrange their environment so that good mood (commonly pleasure) is maximized or maintained, and bad mood (commonly pain) is diminished or alleviated. Environmental arrangement can take many forms, including psychically moving away from or avoiding situations that creates negative effect (such as avoiding a stressful traffic jam), or moving toward or selecting situations that result in gratification (such as strolling in a beautiful garden). Moreover, since entertainment provides its audience with the opportunity to symbolically arrange the environment, mood management theory states that people's entertainment choices should similarly serve the management of moods (Oliver, 2003).

The specific hypotheses of mood management theory have been summarized as follows by Zillmann (2000):

The indicated hedonistic objective is best served by selective exposure to material that (a) is excitationally opposite to prevailing states associated with noxiously experienced hypo- or hyperarousal, (b) has positive hedonic value above that of prevailing states, and (c) in hedonically negative states, has little or no semantic affinity with the prevailing states.

Although mood management suggests that individuals' behaviors often conform to the hedonistic assumption, this theory also makes clear that individuals are not necessarily aware of their motivation. Rather, people are thought to initially arrange their environments in a random fashion, and arrangements that are incidentally made during good moods and that extend or enhance the hedonically positive state leave a memory trace that increases the likelihood for making similar stimulus arrangements under similar circumstances (Zillmann, 1988a, 1988b). In other words, the formation of these preferences is controlled by a mechanism called operant conditioning, which refers to the use of consequences to modify the occurrence and form of behavior.

== Empirical evidence ==
Although its principles relate to the broader realm of mood optimization, mood management theory has largely been applied to entertainment choices. Focusing on viewers' selection of television entertainment, for example, an experimental study by Bryant and Zillmann (1984) reveals that individuals can overcome boredom or stress through selective exposure to exciting or relaxing television programming respectively. In the context of music exposure, Knobloch and Zillmann (2002) demonstrate that individuals could improve negative moods by electing to listen to highly energetic-joyful music. Also, Wakshlag et al. (1983) reported that participants with increased fear levels preferred films with low victimization scores and with high justice scores. This demonstrates that individuals aim to minimize stimuli which are associated with the source of a negative mood. Bryant and Zillman put on an investigation on how to overcome boredom and stress which examined individuals with boredom or stress by having them complete intellectual exam task with a time limit which caused pressure. This was only part one of the examination, the second part involved the participants watching 1 of the 6 TV programs provided. The six programs consisted of three soothing programs and three simulating programs. The evidenced showed that stressed people spent about the same amount of time on both program types while the people who were bored watched tv that was not relaxing but instead watched excited stimulating TV. Bryant and Zillman state this to be supporting for the mood management hypothesis, on their arousal regulation via media consumption.

== Challenges ==
The theoretical proposition of mood management theory has been faced with challenges, especially when studying (1) the role that negative moods and burdening feelings play within the entertainment experience; (2) the diversity of individual users, social and cultural situations, and media products on offer, and (3) the new, so-called interactive media and how entertainment can best be conceptualized within them (Vorderer, 2003). Media exposure has recently been one of the options for stimulus arrangements. Four challenges we go through that are mood-altering are Excitatory potential, Absorption potential, Semantic affinity and Hedonic Valence.
