= Charles Altieri =

English academic

Charles Altieri is an American literary scholar, critic, and Professor Emeritus of English at the University of California, Berkeley, where he held the Rachael Anderson Stageberg Chair in English. His work, consisting of 11 books and over two hundred articles, addresses twentieth- and twenty-first-century American and British poetry, modern literary theory, the visual arts, and intersections between literature and philosophy that extend to writing on Plato, Ovid, and Shakespeare.

== Academic Career ==
At the University of California, Berkeley, Altieri served as Professor and later Professor Emeritus, holding the Rachael Anderson Stageberg Endowed Chair. Over the course of his career, he taught courses in nineteenth-century thought, Victorian literature, modern and contemporary English and American poetry, classical and modern literary theory, and literature’s relationship to the visual arts. He also led interdisciplinary seminars that explored philosophical questions within poetry and art.

Altieri retired from full-time teaching in July 2021 but has remained active in research and mentoring. His ongoing teaching interests include Shakespeare, Hegel, and epic literature subjects through which he continues to explore the concept of affect and its function in literary experience.

== Research and scholarly works ==
=== American Poetry ===
Altieri’s first major monograph, Enlarging the Temple: New Directions in American Poetry of the 1960s (1979), examines how American poets sought to articulate systems of value in a secular cultural context. The study analyzes figures including Robert Lowell, Robert Creeley, W. S. Merwin, and Adrienne Rich, and argues that prevailing New Critical formalism was ill-equipped to address the ethical and social pressures shaping postwar poetry.

In Act and Quality: A Theory of Literary Meaning (1981), Altieri develops a philosophical account of literary meaning grounded in the distinction between explanatory models that treat actions as objects and approaches that attend to the expressive qualities displayed by human actions. Drawing centrally on the later philosophy of Ludwig Wittgenstein, the book establishes a conception of literary interpretation based on expressive “display” rather than on formalist or structuralist abstraction.

After Self and Sensibility in Contemporary American Poetry (1984), Altieri shifted the primary focus of his research toward literary modernism and the visual arts. In Painterly Abstraction in Modernist American Poetry (1989), he argues that modernist poetry can be productively understood through the formal innovations of modern painting, beginning with Paul Cézanne and extending to later abstraction.

This approach informs Altieri’s readings of poets such as Ezra Pound, whose work he treats as exemplary of a poetics in which meaning emerges through the manner of expression rather than descriptive representation.

Altieri extended this framework to postmodern art and literature in Postmodernism Now: Essays on Contemporaneity in the Arts. The book analyzes theoretical contradictions within accounts of postmodernism and argues that artists and writers employ formal and conceptual instability as a mode of cultural awareness. Central to this study is his interpretation of the work of John Ashbery, alongside painters and poets associated with experimental and postwar art.

Altieri subsequently returned to modernist poetry in The Art of Modern American Poetry and in Modernist Poetry and the Limitations of Materialist Theory: The Importance of Constructivist Values. These studies develop a philosophical account of modernist abstraction grounded in the concept of “inner sensuousness,” derived from the aesthetic theory of G. W. F. Hegel, and argue that materialist approaches to literature cannot adequately explain the experiential and affective dimensions of modernist form.

=== Wallace Stevens and phenomenology of value ===
Altieri’s most sustained single-author study is Wallace Stevens and the Demands of Modernity: Toward a Phenomenology of Value, devoted to Wallace Stevens. The book advances a phenomenological account of how poetic imagination transforms lived situations into experiences of value. Altieri traces Stevens’s development from a conception of value influenced by Friedrich Nietzsche, through a broadly Hegelian model of an Absolute that Stevens called “a necessary fiction and finally toward a Wittgensteinian emphasis on particular linguistic practices and resistance to philosophical totalization.

=== Philosophical aesthetics and theory ===
Alongside his historical and interpretive studies, Altieri developed a systematic philosophical aesthetics in a series of theoretical works. Canons and Consequences argues for the cultural and educational significance of standards of excellence. Subjective Agency: A Theory of First-Person Expressivity and its Social Implications advances a theory of expressive agency grounded in Wittgenstein’s notion of display, while The Particulars of Rapture: An Aesthetics of the Affects develops an account of affect as a central dimension of aesthetic experience.

A comprehensive statement of his philosophical position appears in Reckoning with Imagination: Wittgenstein and the Aesthetics of Literary Experience. In this work, Altieri reformulates central claims from Kantian and Hegelian aesthetics in contemporary philosophical terms and argues for the importance of Wittgenstein’s later philosophy for literary criticism, particularly in relation to expression, exemplification, and non-skeptical accounts of meaning.

=== Later work and theory of experience ===
After his retirement in 2021, Altieri’s scholarship increasingly addressed the theory of experience and the role of the arts in liberal education, drawing on the pragmatist tradition associated with William James.In Imaginative Experience in the Arts: Promoting Liberal Education, he distinguishes between “experience of” and “experience as.” The former interprets experience through broader conceptual frameworks that guide judgment and response, while the latter attends to the qualitative particularity of an experience without reducing it to a category. This distinction extends to the arts as a contrast between “example of” and “example as,” where the latter emphasizes the singularity of the work. Within this framework, he introduces “indicative criticism,” a method that analyzes how authorial choices produce this sense of “asness” and situates them within wider social and cultural contexts.

== Reception and influence ==
Altieri is widely regarded as a leading figure in the study of modern and contemporary poetry in the United States. His integration of philosophy, close reading, and aesthetic theory has contributed substantially to debates on poetic form, affect, subjectivity, and value, particularly within modernist and post-modernist literary studies. His work on expressive display, inner sensuousness, and phenomenological approaches to poetry has been influential among literary scholars and philosophers of art.

== Awards ==
- Summer Fellowship, New York State, 1971, 1973, 1974, 1975.
- NEH Younger Humanist Fellowship, 1975.
- Invited Fellow: Institute for Advanced Study in the Behavioral Sciences, Palo Alto, 1980-1981.
- Guggenheim Fellow, 1980-1981.
- Co-Director EH Summer Institute on Ethics and Aesthetics, 1993.
- Elected to American Academy of Arts and Sciences (April, 2003)

== Books ==
- Bibliography of Modern and Contemporary Anglo-American Poetry. Chicago: AHM Publishing Corp., Spring, 1979.
- Enlarging the Temple: New Directions in American Poetry of the 1960s. Lewisburg, PA: Bucknell University Press, Spring 1979.
- Act and Quality: A Theory of Literary Meaning. Amherst: University of Massachusetts Press, 1981.
- Self and Sensibility in Contemporary American Poetry. New York: Cambridge University Press, 1984.
- Painterly Abstraction in Modernist American Poetry: The Contemporaneity of Modernism. New York: Cambridge University Press, 1989. Paperback: Penn State Press, 1994.
- Canons and Consequences. Evanston: Northwestern University Press, 1990.
- Subjective Agency: A Theory of First-Person Expressivity and its Social Implications. Oxford: Blackwells, 1994.
- Postmodernism Now: Essays on Contemporaneity in the Arts. University Park: Penn State University Press, 1998.
- The Particulars of Rapture: An Aesthetics of the Affects. Ithaca: Cornell University Press, 2003.
- The Art of Modern American Poetry. Oxford. Blackwells, 2005.
- Wallace Stevens and the Demands of Modernity: Toward a Phenomenology of Value. Ithaca : Cornell University Press, 2013
- Reckoning with Imagination: Wittgenstein and the Aesthetics of Literary Experience (2015)
- Modernist Poetry and the Limitations of Materialist Theory: The Importance of Constructivist Values (2022)
- Literature, Education, and Society (2024)
- Imaginative Experience in the Arts: Promoting Liberal Education (2025)
