= Romantic Circles =

- Website type: Academic website
- Available in: English
- Headquarters: College Park, Maryland
- Owner: University of Colorado, Boulder
- Creators: Neil Fraistat, Steven E. Jones, Donald Reiman, Carl Stahmer
- Editors: Paul Youngquist and Orrin N.C. Wang
- Website: www.rc.umd.edu romantic-circles.org
- Commercial: No
- Launched: 1996; 30 years ago

Romantic Circles is an academic peer-reviewed website dedicated to the study of Romantic literature and culture, featuring online editions of many texts of the Romantic era, as well as essays devoted to Romantic literature, culture, and theory.

Romantic Circles is published by the University of Colorado, Boulder and supported, in part, by the Maryland Institute for Technology in the Humanities (MITH), and the English Departments of Loyola University of Chicago and the University of Maryland.

== History ==
Romantic Circles was officially launched in November 1996 by general editors Neil Fraistat, Steven E. Jones, Donald Reiman, and Carl Stahmer.

== Sections ==
Of its core peer-reviewed content, Romantic Circles, as of March 2015, housed 38 critically edited electronic editions of literary works, 56 volumes of criticism in its Praxis Series, 5 volumes in its Romantic Pedagogy Commons series, 22 research resources in its Scholarly Resources section, and a section of 275 digitally curated images associated with the Romantic era in The Gallery.

The site is broken up into several main sections:

- Electronic Editions: A searchable archive of texts of the Romantic era. Each editionis peer-reviewed. The section is edited by Tilar Mazzeo.
- Praxis Series (ISSN 1528-8129): Uses computer technologies to investigate critically the languages, cultures, histories, and theories of Romanticism.
- Romanticist scholarship. The section is edited by Orrin N.C. Wang.
- Scholarly Resources: Offers online research tools for the study of the Romantics, their contemporaries, and their cultural contexts. Includes Bibliographies, Indexes and Concordances, and other miscellaneous resources.
- Pedagogies: Includes a peer-reviewed journal Romantic Pedagogy Commons, a "Teaching Romanticism" blog (edited by Katherine Singer), as well as online syllabi, a MOO, and other teaching resources.
- Reviews & Receptions: Offers reviews of key works of scholarship related to the Romantic period. Edited by Suzanne L. Barnett, Alex Gatten, Leonora Hanson, and Ross Wilson
- Romantic Circles Blog: Provides "News, notes, and announcements from the RC Community"
- The Gallery: A curated gallery of Romantic-era images.

== Honours ==
- The site has been recognised by the National Endowment for the Humanities (NEH) as one of the best 21 sites on the Internet for education in the humanities.
- The United States Library of Congress has selected Romantic Circles for inclusion in its historic collections of Internet materials. Over time, the web archiving team will make Romantic Circles available to researchers both onsite at library facilities and though the library's public website.

== Current general editors ==
- Paul Youngquist and Orrin N.C. Wang.
